= Bulgarian euro coins =

Designs of Bulgarian currency

The Bulgarian euro coins feature designs that maintain visual continuity with the former Bulgarian lev coins, which remained in circulation until the introduction of the euro in Bulgaria on 1 January 2026. Designed by the Mint of Bulgaria EAD, the national sides generally replicate the motifs of the previous currency across three distinct designs. The Madara Rider, an early medieval rock relief, is depicted on the 1, 2, 5, 10, 20, and 50 cent coins, mirroring the motif used on the former stotinka coins. The 1 euro coin features Saint Ivan of Rila, the patron saint of Bulgarians, while the 2 euro coin depicts Saint Paisius of Hilendar, a key figure of the Bulgarian National Revival; both portraits were previously used on the 1 lev and 2 leva coins, respectively.

The national side also feature specific inscriptions in the Cyrillic alphabet, with the words "СТОТИНКА" or "СТОТИНКИ" (used as the Bulgarian equivalent for the "EURO CENT") appearing on the 1 to 50-cent coins, and "ЕВРО" (euro) on the 1 and 2-euro coins. The edge of the Bulgarian 2 euro coin reads "БОЖЕ ПАЗИ БЪЛГАРИЯ" (God protect Bulgaria). This follows a tradition from the coinage of the Third Bulgarian Empire, where the same motto was used on historical gold and silver issues. All coins bear the name of the country "БЪЛГАРИЯ" and the year of issue.

Since 2013, the Bulgarian Cyrillic alphabet has been present on euro banknotes. As a result of Bulgaria's accession to the European Union in 2007, the Cyrillic alphabet became the Union's third official alphabet, prompting the European Central Bank to issue a new series of euro banknotes called "Europa".

== History ==
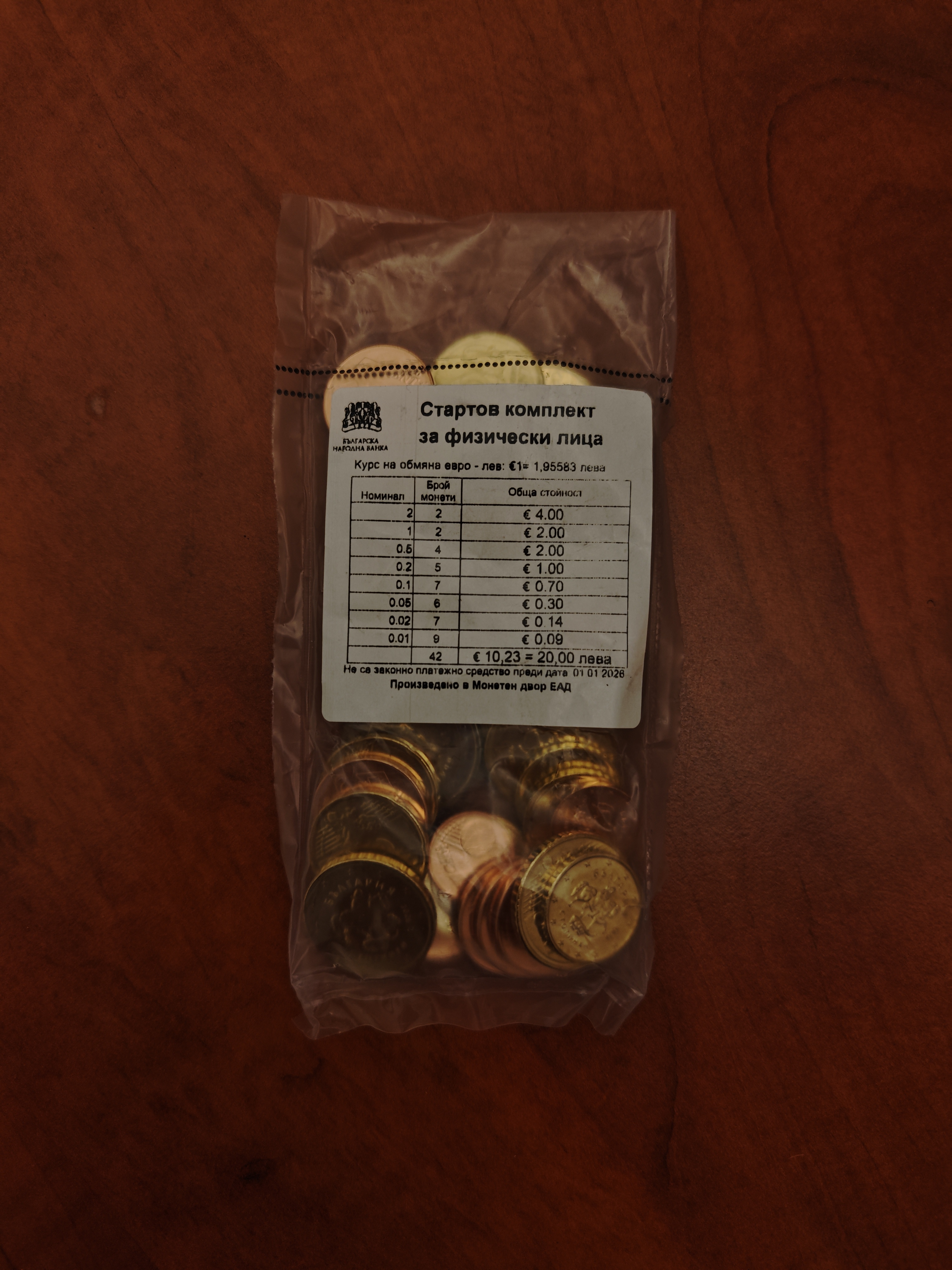
Bulgarian standard euro starter kit

The Bulgarian euro coins entered circulation on 1 January 2026, marking Bulgaria's accession as the 21st member of the eurozone. The design process began years prior, with a 2008 national vote favoring the Madara Rider as the primary symbol. Ultimately, the Bulgarian National Bank (BNB) officially decided to replicate the designs of the former Bulgarian lev coins for the new currency for continuity. This decision retained the Madara Rider for the 1 to 50 cent coins, while Saint Ivan of Rila and Saint Paisius of Hilendar were selected for the 1 and 2 euro coins, respectively.

To familiarize the public with the new currency, Bulgaria released euro coin starter kits on 1 December 2025. The standard kit, containing 42 coins with a face value of €10.23, was sold for 20 leva. A larger business kit, containing 420 coins with a face value of €102.30, was made available for 200 leva. These kits were distributed through the Bulgarian National Bank, commercial banks, and post offices.

== Bulgarian euro design ==
For images of the common side and a detailed description of the coins, see euro coins.

Depiction of Bulgarian euro coinage | Obverse side
€0.01	€0.02	€0.05
The design depicts the Madara Rider (Madara Horseman), an 8th-century UNESCO World Heritage rock relief. The horseman faces right, spearing a lion. Inscriptions: "БЪЛГАРИЯ" (Bulgaria) at the top; the year "2026" to the right; and the denomination "СТОТИНКА" (stotinka, singular) at the bottom (1 cent coin) or "СТОТИНКИ" (stotinki, plural) (2 and 5 cent coins).
€0.10	€0.20	€0.50
The design is identical to the 1, 2 and 5 cent coins, featuring the Madara Rider. Inscriptions: "БЪЛГАРИЯ" (Bulgaria) at the top; the year "2026" to the right; and the denomination "СТОТИНКИ" (stotinki, plural) at the bottom.
€1.00	€2.00	€2 Coin Edge
		"БОЖЕ ПАЗИ БЪЛГАРИЯ" (GOD PROTECT BULGARIA in Bulgarian)
Depicts St. Ivan Rilski (St. John of Rila), the patron saint of Bulgaria and founder of the Rila Monastery. He is shown full-length, holding a cross and a scroll. Inscriptions: "БЪЛГАРИЯ" (Bulgaria) to the right; "ЕВРО" (euro) to the left and the year "2026" vertically to the left.	Depicts Paisiy Hilendarski (Saint Paisius of Hilendar), a key figure of the Bulgarian National Revival and author of Istoriya Slavyanobolgarskaya. He is shown in profile, holding a quill and book. Inscriptions: "БЪЛГАРИЯ" (Bulgaria) to the right; "ЕВРО" (euro) to the left and the year "2026" vertically to the left.	"БОЖЕ ПАЗИ БЪЛГАРИЯ" (GOD PROTECT BULGARIA in Bulgarian)

== Circulating mintage quantities ==
Face Value	€0.01	€0.02	€0.05	€0.10	€0.20	€0.50	€1.00	€2.00
2026								

== Identifying marks ==
National Identifier	БЪЛГАРИЯ
Mint Mark	None
Engravers Initials	None
€2 Edge inscription	• БОЖЕ ПАЗИ БЪЛГАРИЯ written twice, both normally and in reverse.

== €2 commemorative coins ==
Year	Subject	Volume

== See also ==
- Adoption of the euro in Bulgaria
- 2007 enlargement of the European Union
- Enlargement of the eurozone
