= RAN =

RAN may refer to:

- Radio access network, a part of a mobile telecommunication system
- Rainforest Action Network
- Ran (gene) (RAs-related Nuclear protein), also known as GTP-binding nuclear protein Ran, a protein that in humans is encoded by the RAN gene
- Ran (Sufism), a concept of Sufism
- RAN translation (Repeat Associated Non-AUG translation), an irregular mode of mRNA translation
- Ran Online (stylized as RAN Online), a massively multiplayer online role-playing game developed by Min Communications, Inc.
- RAN Remote Area Nurse (TV series)
- Rapid automatized naming, a predictor of reading ability
- Ravenna Airport, an airport in Ravenna, Italy by IATA code
- Régie du Chemin de Fer Abidjan-Niger, a railway in French West Africa, linking Côte d'Ivoire to Upper Volta (now called Burkina Faso)
- Remote Area Nurse, in Australia
- Royal Australian Navy, the naval branch of the Australian Defence Force
- Rugby Americas North, the administrative body of rugby union in North America and the Caribbean
- Russian Academy of Sciences (transliteration of its Russian acronym Rossiiskaya Akademiya Nauk)
- RAN (Indonesian group)

== See also ==
- Ran (disambiguation)
