= Ran =

Ran, RaN and ran may refer to:

== Arts and entertainment ==
- Ran (film), a 1985 film directed by Akira Kurosawa
- "Ran" (song), a 2013 Japanese song by Luna Sea
- Ran Online, a 2004 MMORPG (massively multiplayer online role playing game)
- Ran, a 1903 Swedish opera on the Nordic myth by Wilhelm Peterson-Berger

== People ==
- Ran (surname), a Chinese surname
- Ran (given name)
- Ran Masaki (Japanese: 真咲 乱, born 1965), Japanese JAV actress
- Ran Bosilek, Bulgarian children's book author born Gencho Stanchev Negentsov (1886–1958)
- RaN, Nissim of Gerona (1320–1376), Rabbi Nissim ben Reuven (RaN, the Hebrew acronym of his name, ר"ן)

== Fictional or mythological characters ==
- Rán, a goddess of the sea in Norse mythology
- Ran (Shugo Chara!), in the manga series Shugo Chara!
- Ran (Urusei Yatsura), in the manga series Urusei Yatsura
- Ran, from the sprite webcomic Bob and George
- Ran Aresu, from Inazuma Eleven
- Ran Kotobuki, in the manga series Gals!
- Ran Kuroki, a character from Kamen Rider Fourze
- Ran Mitake (美竹 蘭), a character in the media franchise BanG Dream!
- Ran Mori, in the manga series Detective Conan
- Ran Shibuki, in the arcade collectible card game series Aikatsu
- Ran Uzaki, a main character from the 2007 Japanese tokusatsu television series Juken Sentai Gekiranger
- Ran Yakumo, in the Touhou Project series of games
- Ran Hanamichi, a character in Delicious Party Pretty Cure

== Other uses ==
- Ran (star) or Epsilon Eridani, a star
- Ran (protein), a small GTPase that is involved in import and export within a cell nucleus as well as mitosis
- ran, in mathematics, an abbreviation of range

== See also ==
- RAN (disambiguation)
