= Commemorative coins of Bulgaria =

Commemorative coins in Bulgaria

Commemorative coins have been issued in Bulgaria since 1965 by the Bulgarian National Bank, headquartered in Sofia, and minted by the Bulgarian Mint (Bulgarian: Монетен двор).

Metal compositions
Platinum (Pt)
Gold (Au)
Silver (Ag)
Copper (Cu)
Copper/Nickel (Cu/Ni)

== Commemorative coins issued since 1965 ==
Image	Nr.	Issued date	1960s	Metal composition	Value (BGN)	Mintage
	1.	1965	1100 Years Slavonic Letters; 2 Leva Collector Coin	Ag 900°	2 Leva	10 000
	2.	1965	1100 Years Slavonic Letters; 5 Leva Collector Coin	Ag 900°	5 Leva	5 000
	3.	1965	1100 Years Slavonic Letters; 10 Leva Collector Coin	Au 900°	10 Leva	7 000
	4.	1965	1100 Years Slavonic Letters; 20 Leva Collector Coin	Au 900°	20 Leva	3 000
	5.	1965	Georgi Dimitrov; 2 Leva Collector Coin	Ag 900°	2 Leva	20 000
	6.	1965	Georgi Dimitrov; 5 Leva Collector Coin	Ag 900°	5 Leva	10 000
	7.	1965	Georgi Dimitrov; 10 Leva Collector Coin	Au 900°	10 Leva	10 000
	8.	1965	Georgi Dimitrov; 20 Leva Collector Coin	Au 900°	20 Leva	5 000
	9.	1966	1050 Years since the Death of Saint Clement of Ohrid; 2 Leva Coin	Cu/Ni	2 Leva	506 000
	10.	1969	25 Years since the Socialist Revolution in Bulgaria; 1 Lev Coin	Cu/Ni	1 Lev	3700000
	11.	1969	25 Years since the Socialist Revolution in Bulgaria; 2 Leva Coin	Cu/Ni	2 Leva	1500000
	12.	1969	90 Years since the Liberation of Bulgaria from Ottoman Rule; 1 Lev Coin	Cu/Ni	1 Lev	2150000
	13.	1969	90 Years since the Liberation of Bulgaria from Ottoman Rule; 2 Leva Coin	Cu/Ni	2 Leva	1900000
Image	Nr.	Issued date	1970s	Metal composition	Value (BGN)	Mintage
	14.	1970	120 Years since the Birth of Ivan Vazov (BU); 5 Leva Collector Coin	Ag 900°	5 Leva	110 000
	15.	1970	120 Years since the Birth of Ivan Vazov (proof); 5 Leva Collector Coin	Ag 900°	5 Leva	110 000
	16.	1971	150 Years since the Birth of Georgi Sava Rakovski; 5 Leva Collector Coin	Ag 900°	5 Leva	300 000
	17.	1972	250 Years since the Birth of Paìsiy Hilendàrski; 5 Leva Collector Coin	Ag 900°	5 Leva	200 000
	18.	1972	150 Years since the Birth of Dobri Chintulov; 2 Leva Collector Coin	Cu/Ni	2 Leva	100 000
	19.	1973	100 Years since the Death of Vasil Levski; 5 Leva Collector Coin	Ag 900°	5 Leva	200 000
	20.	1973	50 Years since the September 1923 Anti-Fascist Uprising; 5 Leva Collector Coin	Ag 900°	5 Leva	200 000
	21.	1974	30 Years since the September 1944 Anti-Fascist People's Uprising; 5 Leva Collector Coin	Ag 900°	5 Leva	200 000
	22.	1974	50 Years since the Death of Aleksandar Stamboliyski; 5 Leva Collector Coin	Ag 900°	5 Leva	200 000
	23.	1975	10th Olympic Congress, Varna (Bulgaria), 1973 (Sport for a Peaceful World); 10 Leva Collector Coin	Ag 900°	10 Leva	50 000
	24.	1975	10th Olympic Congress, Varna (Bulgaria), 1973 (Citius, Altius, Fortius); 10 Leva Collector Coin	Ag 900°	10 Leva	50 000
	25.	1976	100 Years since the April Uprising,1876; 1 Lev Collector Coin	Cu 900°	1 Lev	300 000
	26.	1976	100 Years since the April Uprising,1876; 2 Leva Collector Coin	Cu/Ni	2 Leva	300 000
	27.	1976	100 Years since the April Uprising,1876; 5 Leva Collector Coin	Ag 500°	5 Leva	200 000
	28.	1976	100 Years since the Death of Hristo Botev; 5 Leva Collector Coin	Ag 900°	5 Leva	200 000
	29.	1977	1977 Summer Universiade, Sofia (Bulgaria); 50 Stotinki Coin	Cu/Ni	50 Stotinki	2 000 000
	30.	1977	150 Years since the Birth of Petko Slaveikov; 5 Leva Collector Coin	Ag 500°	5 Leva	200 000
	31.	1978	100 Years since the Birth of Peyo Yavorov; 5 Leva Collector Coin	Ag 500°	5 Leva	200 000
	32.	1978	100 Years since the Liberation of Bulgaria from Ottoman Rule, 1878; 10 Leva Collector Coin	Ag 500°	10 Leva	200 000
	33.	1978	100 Years the SS. Cyril and Methodius National Library; 5 Leva Collector Coin	Ag 500°	5 Leva	200 000
	34.	1979	100 Years Bulgarian Telecommunications (BU); 5 Leva Collector Coin	Ag 500°	5 Leva	35 000
	35.	1979	100 Years Bulgarian Telecommunications (proof); 5 Leva Collector Coin	Ag 500°	5 Leva	15 000
	36.	1979	Sofia – 100 Years the Capital of Bulgaria (BU); 20 Leva Collector Coin	Ag 500°	20 Leva	35 000
	37.	1979	Sofia – 100 Years the Capital of Bulgaria (proof); 20 Leva Collector Coin	Ag 900°	20 Leva	15 000
	38.	1979	First Soviet-Bulgarian Space Flight (BU); 10 Leva Collector Coin	Ag 500°	10 Leva	35 000
	39.	1979	First Soviet-Bulgarian Space Flight (proof); 10 Leva Collector Coin	Ag 900°	10 Leva	15 000
	40.	1979	International Year of the Child; 10 Leva Collector Coin	Ag 925°	10 Leva	25 000
	41.	1979	International Year of the Child (Piedfort); 10 Leva Collector Coin	Ag 925°	10 Leva	2 000
Image	Nr.	Issued date	1980s	Metal composition	Value (BGN)	Mintage
	42.	1980	1982 FIFA World Cup, Spain (BU); 1 Lev Collector Coin	Cu/Ni	1 Lev	220 000
	43.	1980	1982 FIFA World Cup, Spain (proof); 1 Lev Collector Coin	Cu/Ni	1 Lev	30 000
	44.	1980	1982 FIFA World Cup, Spain (BU); 2 Leva Collector Coin	Cu/Ni	2 Leva	220 000
	45.	1980	1982 FIFA World Cup, Spain (proof); 2 Leva Collector Coin	Cu/Ni	2 Leva	30 000
	46.	1980	1982 FIFA World Cup, Spain (BU); 5 Leva Collector Coin	Cu/Ni	5 Leva	220 000
	47.	1980	1982 FIFA World Cup, Spain (proof); 5 Leva Collector Coin	Cu/Ni	5 Leva	30 000
	48.	1980	100 Years since the Birth of Yordan Yovkov; 2 Leva Collector Coin	Cu/Ni	2 Leva	200 000
	49.	1981	World Hunting Exposition, Plovdiv (Bulgaria), EXPO'81 (BU); 1 Lev Collector Coin	Cu/Ni	1 Lev	250 000
	50.	1981	World Hunting Exposition, Plovdiv (Bulgaria), EXPO'81 (proof); 1 Lev Collector Coin	Cu/Ni	1 Lev	50 000
	51.	1981	World Hunting Exposition, Plovdiv (Bulgaria), EXPO'81 (BU); 2 Leva Collector Coin	Cu/Ni	2 Leva	250 000
	52.	1981	World Hunting Exposition, Plovdiv (Bulgaria), EXPO'81 (proof); 2 Leva Collector Coin	Cu/Ni	2 Leva	50 000
	53.	1981	World Hunting Exposition, Plovdiv (Bulgaria), EXPO'81 (BU); 5 Leva Collector Coin	Cu/Ni	5 Leva	250 000
	54.	1981	World Hunting Exposition, Plovdiv (Bulgaria), EXPO'81 (proof); 5 Leva Collector Coin	Cu/Ni	5 Leva	50 000
	55.	1981	1300 Years Bulgaria • 681. The Madara Rider Figure; 2 Leva Collector Coin	Cu/Ni	2 Leva	300 000
	56.	1981	1300 Years Bulgaria • 681. The Madara Rider Figure; 50 Leva Collector Coin	Ag 900°	50 Leva	10 000
	57.	1981	1300 Years Bulgaria • Slavonic Letters; 2 Leva Collector Coin	Cu/Ni	2 Leva	300 000
	58.	1981	1300 Years Bulgaria • 800 Years since the Uprising of Аssen and Petar; 2 Leva Collector Coin	Cu/Ni	2 Leva	300 000
	59.	1981	1300 Years Bulgaria • Ivan Assen II; 2 Leva Collector Coin	Cu/Ni	2 Leva	300 000
	60.	1981	1300 Years Bulgaria • Ivan Assen II; 50 Leva Collector Coin	Ag 900°	50 Leva	10 000
	61.	1981	1300 Years Bulgaria • The Boyana Church; 2 Leva Collector Coin	Cu/Ni	2 Leva	300 000
	62.	1981	1300 Years Bulgaria • The Rila Monastery; 2 Leva Collector Coin	Cu/Ni	2 Leva	300 000
	63.	1981	1300 Years Bulgaria • Haidouks; 2 Leva Collector Coin	Cu/Ni	2 Leva	300 000
	64.	1981	1300 Years Bulgaria • Oborishte; 2 Leva Collector Coin	Cu/Ni	2 Leva	300 000
	65.	1981	1300 Years Bulgaria • The Liberation; 2 Leva Collector Coin	Cu/Ni	2 Leva	300 000
	66.	1981	1300 Years Bulgaria • The Union of Eastern Rumelia with the Bulgarian Principality; 2 Leva Collector Coin	Cu/Ni	2 Leva	300 000
	67.	1981	1300 Years Bulgaria • Bouzloudja, 1891; 2 Leva Collector Coin	Cu/Ni	2 Leva	300 000
	68.	1981	1300 Years Bulgaria • The Republic; 2 Leva Collector Coin	Cu/Ni	2 Leva	300 000
	69.	1981	1300 Years Bulgaria • The Republic; 50 Leva Collector Coin	Ag 900°	50 Leva	10 000
	70.	1981	1300 Years Bulgaria • Mother with Child; 2 Leva Collector Coin	Cu/Ni	2 Leva	300 000
	71.	1981	1300 Years Bulgaria • Mother with Child; 25 Leva Collector Coin	Ag 500°	25 Leva	100 000
	72.	1981	1300 Years Bulgaria • Mother with Child; 50 Leva Collector Coin	Ag 900°	50 Leva	10 000
	73.	1981	1300 Years Bulgaria • Mother with Child; 1000 Leva Collector Coin	Au 900°	1000 Leva	2 000
	74.	1981	1300 Years Bulgaria • Eternal Friendship between People's Republic of Bulgaria and the USSR (BU); 1 Lev Collector Coin	Cu/Ni	1 Lev	250 000
	75.	1981	1300 Years Bulgaria • Eternal Friendship between People's Republic of Bulgaria and the USSR (proof); 1 Lev Collector Coin	Cu/Ni	1 Lev	50 000
	76.	1981	1300 Years Bulgaria • Hristo Botev and Sándor Petőfi (BU); 5 Leva Collector Coin	Cu/Ni	5 Leva	200 000
	77.	1981	1300 Years Bulgaria • Hristo Botev and Sándor Petőfi (proof); 5 Leva Collector Coin	Cu/Ni	5 Leva	50 000
	78.	1982	1982 FIFA World Cup, Spain • Footballers; 10 Leva Collector Coin	Ag 640°	10 Leva	15 000
	79.	1982	1982 FIFA World Cup, Spain • Sombrero; 10 Leva Collector Coin	Ag 640°	10 Leva	15 000
	80.	1982	100 Years since the Birth of Vladimir Dimitrov, the Master; 5 Leva Collector Coin	Cu/Ni	5 Leva	300 000
	81.	1982	100 Years since the Birth of Georgi Dimitrov; 25 Leva Collector Coin	Ag 500°	25 Leva	15 000
	82.	1982	Second International Children's Assembly, Sofia (Bulgaria), 1982; 5 Leva Collector Coin	Cu/Ni	5 Leva	200 000
	83.	1982	40 Years since the Birth of Lyudmila Zhivkova; 5 Leva Collector Coin	Cu/Ni	5 Leva	20 000
	84.	1982	40 Years since the Birth of Lyudmila Zhivkova; 20 Leva Collector Coin	Ag 500°	20 Leva	10 000
	85.	1984	40 Years of Socialist Bulgaria; 25 Leva Collector Coin	Ag 500°	25 Leva	100 000
	86.	1984	1984 Winter Olympics, Sarajevo (SFRY); 10 Leva Collector Coin	Ag 925°	10 Leva	15 000
	87.	1984	UN Women's Decade; 10 Leva Collector Coin	Ag 925°	10 Leva	20 000
	88.	1984	UN Women's Decade; 100 Leva Collector Coin	Au 900°	100 Leva	15 000
	89.	1985	Intercosmos; 10 Leva Collector Coin	Ag 640°	10 Leva	5 000
	90.	1985	23rd UNESCO General Conference, Sofia (Bulgaria); 5 Leva Collector Coin	Cu/Ni	5 Leva	100 000
	91.	1985	World Inventors Exposition, Plovdiv (Bulgaria), EXPO'85; 5 Leva Collector Coin	Cu/Ni	5 Leva	100 000
	92.	1985	Third International Children's Assembly, Sofia (Bulgaria), 1985; 5 Leva Collector Coin	Cu/Ni	5 Leva	100 000
	93.	1985	90 Years Organized Tourism in Bulgaria • Aleko Konstantinov; 5 Leva Collector Coin	Cu/Ni	5 Leva	100 000
	94.	1986	1986 FIFA World Cup, Mexico; 2 Leva Collector Coin	Cu/Ni	2 Leva	300 000
	95.	1986	1986 FIFA World Cup, Mexico • Griphon; 25 Leva Collector Coin	Ag 925°	25 Leva	10 000
	96.	1986	1986 FIFA World Cup, Mexico • Footballer; 25 Leva Collector Coin	Ag 925°	25 Leva	10 000
	97.	1987	150 Years since the Birth of Vasil Levski; 20 Leva Collector Coin	Ag 500°	20 Leva	100 000
	98.	1987	1987 World Rhythmic Gymnastics Championships, Varna (Bulgaria); 2 Leva Collector Coin	Cu/Ni	2 Leva	?
	99.	1987	1988 Winter Olympics, Calgary (Canada); 1 Lev Collector Coin	Cu/Ni	1 Lev	300 000
	100.	1987	1988 Winter Olympics, Calgary (Canada); 2 Leva Collector Coin	Cu/Ni	2 Leva	300 000
	101.	1987	1988 Winter Olympics, Calgary (Canada); 10 Leva Collector Coin	Ag 640°	10 Leva	15 000
	102.	1987	1988 Winter Olympics, Calgary (Canada); 25 Leva Collector Coin	Ag 925°	25 Leva	15 000
	103.	1988	Fourth International Children's Assembly, Sofia (Bulgaria), 1988; 5 Leva Collector Coin	Cu/Ni	5 Leva	100 000
	104.	1988	120 Years since the Death of Hadji Dimitar and Stefan Karadzha; 5 Leva Collector Coin	Cu/Ni	5 Leva	100 000
	105.	1988	300 Years since the Chiprovtsi Uprising; 5 Leva Collector Coin	Cu/Ni	5 Leva	100 000
	106.	1988	25 Years Kremikovtzi Metal; 5 Leva Collector Coin	Cu/Ni	5 Leva	200 000
	107.	1988	100 Years St. Kliment Ohridski University of Sofia; 2 Leva Collector Coin	Cu/Ni	2 Leva	300 000
	108.	1988	100 Years St. Kliment Ohridski University of Sofia; 20 Leva Collector Coin	Ag 500°	20 Leva	100 000
	109.	1988	100 Years Bulgarian State Railways; 20 Leva Collector Coin	Ag 500°	20 Leva	100 000
	110.	1988	110 Years since the Liberation of Bulgaria from Ottoman Rule; 20 Leva Collector Coin	Ag 500°	20 Leva	100 000
	111.	1988	1988 Summer Olympics, Seoul (Republic of Korea); 1 Lev Collector Coin	Cu/Ni	1 Lev	300 000
	112.	1988	1988 Summer Olympics, Seoul (Republic of Korea); 2 Leva Collector Coin	Cu/Ni	2 Leva	300 000
	113.	1988	1988 Summer Olympics, Seoul (Republic of Korea); 10 Leva Collector Coin	Ag 640°	10 Leva	30 000
	114.	1988	1988 Summer Olympics, Seoul (Republic of Korea); 25 Leva Collector Coin	Ag 925°	25 Leva	30 000
	115.	1988	Second Soviet-Bulgarian Space Flight; 2 Leva Collector Coin	Cu/Ni	2 Leva	?
	116.	1988	Second Soviet-Bulgarian Space Flight; 20 Leva Collector Coin	Ag 500°	20 Leva	?
	117.	1989	1989 Canoe-Kayak World Championship, Plovdiv (Bulgaria); 2 Leva Collector Coin	Cu/Ni	2 Leva	300 000
	118.	1989	250 Years since the Birth of Sofronii Vrachanski; 5 Leva Collector Coin	Cu/Ni	5 Leva	100 000
	119.	1989	200 Years since the Birth of Vasil Aprilov; 5 Leva Collector Coin	Cu/Ni	5 Leva	100 000
	120.	1989	120 Years Bulgarian Academy of Sciences; 20 Leva Collector Coin	Ag 500°	20 Leva	100 000
	121.	1989	Endangered Wild Animals • Mother bear with cubs 25 Leva Collector Coin	Ag 925°	25 Leva	20 000
	122.	1989	1992 Winter Olympics, Albertville (France) • Figure Skating; 25 Leva Collector Coin	Ag 925°	25 Leva	80 000
	123.	1989	1992 Summer Olympics, Barcelona (Spain) • Canoe; 25 Leva Collector Coin	Ag 925°	25 Leva	80 000
	124.	1989	1990 FIFA World Cup, Italy • Footballers; 25 Leva Collector Coin	Ag 925°	25 Leva	20 000
Image	Nr.	Issued date	1990s	Metal composition	Value (BGN)	Mintage
	125.	1990	1990 FIFA World Cup, Italy • Football shoe 25 Leva Collector Coin	Ag 925°	25 Leva	20 000
	126.	1990	1990 FIFA World Cup, Italy • Football; 25 Leva Collector Coin	Ag 925°	25 Leva	20 000
	127.	1990	1992 Winter Olympics, Albertville (France) • Ski-running; 25 Leva Collector Coin	Ag 925°	25 Leva	80 000
	128.	1990	1992 Summer Olympics, Barcelona (Spain) • Marathon; 25 Leva Collector Coin	Ag 925°	25 Leva	80 000
	129.	1990	Endangered Wild Animals • Lynx; 25 Leva Collector Coin	Ag 925°	25 Leva	20 000
	130.	1992	1994 Winter Olympics, Lillehammer (Norway) • Ski-slalom; 50 Leva Collector Coin	Ag 925°	50 Leva	100 000
	131.	1992	Endangered Wild Animals • Golden eagle 100 Leva Collector Coin	Ag 925°	100 Leva	30 000
	132.	1992	The Radetzky Steamship; 100 Leva Collector Coin	Ag 925°	100 Leva	30 000
	133.	1993	1994 Winter Olympics, Lillehammer (Norway) • Bobsleigh; 100 Leva Collector Coin	Ag 925°	100 Leva	60 000
	134.	1993	1994 FIFA World Cup, USA • Footballer; 100 Leva Collector Coin	Ag 925°	100 Leva	30 000
	135.	1993	Republic of Bulgaria's Association with the European Community • "Theodore Stratelates"; 500 Leva Collector Coin	Ag 925°	500 Leva	55 000
	136.	1993	Republic of Bulgaria's Association with the European Community • "Cyrillic script" 5000 Leva Collector Coin	Au 900°	5000 Leva	5 000
	137.	1993	Republic of Bulgaria's Association with the European Community • "Desislava"; 10 000 Leva Collector Coin	Pt 999°	10 000 Leva	5 000
	138.	1993	The Parliament; 100 Leva Collector Coin	Ag 925°	100 Leva	30 000
	139.	1993	Endangered Wild Animals • Wild Goat; 100 Leva Collector Coin	Ag 925°	100 Leva	30 000
	140.	1994	St. Alexander Nevski Cathedral; 10 000 Leva Collector Coin	Au 900°	10 000 Leva	30 000
	141.	1994	1994 FIFA World Cup, USA • Football Net; 500 Leva Collector Coin	Ag 925°	500 Leva	30 000
	142.	1994	100 Years Gymnastics in Bulgaria; 50 Leva Collector Coin	Cu/Ni	50 Leva	50 000
	143.	1995	Astronomical Observatory – Rozhen Peak; 1000 Leva Collector Coin	Ag 925°	1000 Leva	50 000
	144.	1995	100 Years Olympic Games, 1996; 1000 Leva Collector Coin	Ag 925°	1000 Leva	60 000
	145.	1995	50 Years FAO; 1000 Leva Collector Coin	Ag 925°	1000 Leva	30 000
	146.	1995	110 Years of the Union of Eastern Rumelia with the Bulgarian Principality; 1000 Leva Collector Coin	Ag 925°	1000 Leva	30 000
	147.	1996	100 Years National Academy of Art; 500 Leva Collector Coin	Ag 925°	500 Leva	30 000
	148.	1996	Kaliakra (Tall ship); 1000 Leva Collector Coin	Ag 925°	1000 Leva	30 000
	149.	1996	St. Ivan Rilski; 1000 Leva Collector Coin	Ag 925°	1000 Leva	50 000
	150.	1996	1998 Winter Olympics, Nagano (Japan) • Speed Skating; 1000 Leva Collector Coin	Ag 925°	1000 Leva	60 000
	151.	1996	1998 FIFA World Cup, France • Two Footballers; 500 Leva Collector Coin	Ag 925°	500 Leva	60 000
	152.	1997	1998 FIFA World Cup, France • Footballer in Attack; 1000 Leva Collector Coin	Ag 925°	1000 Leva	30 000
	153.	1997	Singing Bulgarian Child; 1000 Leva Collector Coin	Ag 925°	1000 Leva	25 000
	154.	1997	For Atlantic Solidarity; 500 Leva Collector Coin	Cu/Ni	500 Leva	30 000
	155.	1998	Bulgaria's Association with the European Community • St. Sofia Church; 5000 Leva Collector Coin	Ag 925°	5000 Leva	50 000
	156.	1998	Bulgaria's Association with the European Community • Rhyton; 10 000 Leva Collector Coin	Ag 925°	10 000 Leva	30 000
	157.	1998	120 Years of Bulgaria's Liberation from Ottoman Rule; 10 000 Leva Collector Coin	Ag 925°	10 000 Leva	20 000
	158.	1998	100 Years Bulgarian Telegraph Agency; 1000 Leva Collector Coin	Cu/Ni	1000 Leva	20 000
	159.	1998	Tetraevangelia of Tzar Ivan Alexander; 20 000 Leva Collector Coin	Au 999°	20 000 Leva	30 000
	160.	1999	120 Years Bulgarian National Bank; 20 000 Leva Collector Coin	Au 999°	20 000 Leva	30 000
	161.	1999	The Virgin Mary with Infant Christ; 20 Leva Collector Coin	Au 999°	20 Leva	10 000
	162.	1999	120 Years Council of Ministers • EURO; 10 Leva Collector Coin	Ag 925°	10 Leva	20 000
	163.	1999	120 Years Council of Ministers • EURO; 100 Leva Collector Coin	Au 900°	100 Leva	5 000
	164.	1999	A Plovdiv House • EURO; 10 Leva Collector Coin	Ag 925°	10 Leva	20 000
	165.	1999	Wild Animals • Monk Seal; 10 Leva Collector Coin	Ag 925°	10 Leva	15 000
	166.	1999	2000 Summer Olympics, Sydney (Australia) • High Jump; 10 Leva Collector Coin	Ag 925°	10 Leva	20 000
Image	Nr.	Issued date	2000s	Metal composition	Value (BGN)	Mintage
	167.	2000	Bulgaria's Association with the European Union • Tsar Theodore Svetoslav Terter; 10 Leva Collector Coin	Ag 925°	10 Leva	20 000
	168.	2000	Bulgaria's Association with the European Union • The Church of Christ Pantocrator, Nessebar; 10 Leva Collector Coin	Ag 925°	10 Leva	20 000
	169.	2000	The Beginning of the New Millennium; 10 Leva Collector Coin	Ag 925°	10 Leva	6 000
	170.	2000	2000 Summer Olympics, Sidney (Australia) • Weightlifting; 10 Leva Collector Coin	Ag 925°	10 Leva	20 000
	171.	2001	2002 Winter Olympics, Salt Lake City (USA) • Ski Jump; 10 Leva Collector Coin	Ag 925°	10 Leva	25 000
	172.	2001	Bulgaria's Association with the European Union • Bulgarian Higher Education; 10 Leva Collector Coin	Ag 925°	10 Leva	100 000
	173.	2002	Golden Bulgarian Lev; 1 Lev Collector Coin	Au 999°	1 Lev	2 000
	174.	2002	Sourvakari; 5 Leva Collector Coin	Cu/Ni - Coloured	5 Leva	5 000
	175.	2002	2004 Summer Olympics, Athens (Greece) – "Wrestling"; 5 Leva Collector Coin	Au 999°	5 Leva	12 000
	176.	2002	2004 Summer Olympics, Athens (Greece) – "Weightlifting"; 5 Leva Collector Coin	Au 999°	5 Leva	12 000
	177.	2002	2004 Summer Olympics, Athens (Greece) – "Pierre de Coubertain"; 5 Leva Collector Coin	Au 999°	5 Leva	17 000
	178.	2002	2004 Summer Olympics, Athens (Greece) – "Swimming"; 5 Leva Collector Coin	Au 999°	5 Leva	12 000
	179.	2002	2004 Summer Olympics, Athens (Greece) – "Gymnastics – Pommel Horse"; 5 Leva Collector Coin	Au 999°	5 Leva	12 000
	180.	2002	2004 Summer Olympics, Athens (Greece) – "Fencing"; 5 Leva Collector Coin	Au 999°	5 Leva	12 000
	181.	2002	2004 Summer Olympics, Athens (Greece) – "Tennis"; 5 Leva Collector Coin	Au 999°	5 Leva	12 000
	182.	2002	2004 Summer Olympics, Athens (Greece) – "Archery"; 5 Leva Collector Coin	Au 999°	5 Leva	12 000
	183.	2002	2004 Summer Olympics, Athens (Greece) – "Running"; 5 Leva Collector Coin	Au 999°	5 Leva	12 000
	184.	2002	2004 Summer Olympics, Athens (Greece) – "Cycling"; 5 Leva Collector Coin	Au 999°	5 Leva	12 000
	185.	2003	The 60th Anniversary of the Rescue of Jewish People in Bulgaria • Dimitar Peshev; 10 Leva Collector Coin	Ag 925°	10 Leva	2 000
	186.	2003	My Childhood; 5 Leva Collector Coin	Cu/Ni - Coloured	5 Leva	10 000
	187.	2003	2006 FIFA World Cup, Germany; 5 Leva Collector Coin	Ag 925°	5 Leva	50 000
	188.	2003	The Virgin Mary; 20 Leva Collector Coin	Au 999°	20 Leva	20 000
	189.	2004	Palm Sunday; 5 Leva Collector Coin	Cu/Ni - Coloured	5 Leva	10 000
	190.	2004	125 years Bulgarian National Bank; 125 Leva Collector Coin	Au 999°	125 Leva	3 000
	191.	2004	100 Years Ivan Vazov National Theatre (Piedfort); 10 Leva Collector Coin	Ag 999°	10 Leva	5 000
	192.	2004	100 Years Ivan Vazov National Theatre; 10 Leva Collector Coin	Ag 999°	10 Leva	5 000
	193.	2004	St. Nickolai Mirlikiyski Chudotvorets; 10 Leva Collector Coin	Ag 999°	10 Leva	8 000
	194.	2005	Baba Marta; 5 Leva Collector Coin	Cu/Ni - Coloured	5 Leva	10 000
	195.	2005	2006 Winter Olympics, Torino, Italy • Shorttrack; 10 Leva Collector Coin	Ag 925°	10 Leva	4 000
	196.	2005	Bulgaria – European Union; 1.95583 Leva Collector Coin	Ag 999°	1.95583 Leva	14 000
	197.	2005	Treasures of Bulgaria • The Gold Mask; 10 Leva Collector Coin	Ag 999°	10 Leva	10 000
	198.	2006	Bulgarian Crafts • Viticulture and Wine Production; 5 Leva Collector Coin	Ag 500° - Coloured	5 Leva	10 000
	199.	2006	National Parks and Reserves • The Black Sea Coast; 10 Leva Collector Coin	Ag 925°	10 Leva	7 000
	200.	2006	Treasures of Bulgaria • The Letnitsa silver treasure 10 Leva Collector Coin	Ag 999°	10 Leva	10 000
	201.	2006	Bulgarian Iconography • St. John the Baptist; 20 Leva Collector Coin	Au 999°	20 Leva	12 000
	202.	2007	Bulgaria in the European Union; 1.95583 Leva Collector Coin	Ag 999°	1.95583 Leva	14 000
	203.	2007	The Great Bulgarian Voices • Boris Christoff; 10 Leva Collector Coin	Ag 999°	10 Leva	10 000
	204.	2007	National Parks and Reserves • The Bulgarian Mountains - Pirin; 10 Leva Collector Coin	Ag 925°	10 Leva	6 000
	205.	2007	Bulgarian Iconography • St. George the Victorious; 20 Leva Collector Coin	Au 999°	20 Leva	8 000
	206.	2007	Bulgarian Iconography • St. George the Victorious; 100 Leva Collector Coin	Au 999°	100 Leva	1 500
	207.	2007	Bulgarian Crafts • Carpet Making; 5 Leva Collector Coin	Ag 500° - Coloured	5 Leva	7 000
	208.	2007	Treasures of Bulgaria • Pegasus from Vazovo; 10 Leva Collector Coin	Ag 999°	10 Leva	10 000
	209.	2008	130th Anniversary of Bulgaria's Liberation; 10 Leva Collector Coin	Ag 925°	10 Leva	10 000
	210.	2008	Shooting sports 10 Leva Collector Coin	Ag 925°	10 Leva	5 000
	211.	2008	Treasures of Bulgaria • Seuthes III; 10 Leva Collector Coin	Ag 999°	10 Leva	8 000
	212.	2008	100 Years of Bulgaria's Independence; 10 Leva Collector Coin	Ag 925°	10 Leva	5 000
	213.	2008	The Great Bulgarian Voices • Nicolai Ghiaurov; 10 Leva Collector Coin	Ag 999°	10 Leva	6 000
	214.	2008	The Holy Tsar Boris I the Baptist; 20 Leva Collector Coin	Au 999°	20 Leva	8 000
	215.	2009	110 Years since the Birth of Dechko Uzunov; 2 Leva Collector Coin	Cu 999°	2 Leva	8 000
	216.	2009	130 Years Bulgarian National Bank; 10 Leva Collector Coin	Ag 999°	10 Leva	4 000
	217.	2009	Traditional Bulgarian Crafts • Pottery; 5 Leva Collector Coin	Ag 500° - Coloured	5 Leva	6 000
	218.	2009	Bulgarian Iconography • St. Dimitar the Wonderworker; 100 Leva Collector Coin	Au 999°	100 Leva	4 000
Image	Nr.	Issued date	2010s	Metal composition	Value (BGN)	Mintage
	219.	2010	140 Years Bulgarian Exarchate; 10 Leva Collector Coin	Ag 925°	10 Leva	6 000
	220.	2010	Natural Phenomenon • Belogradchik Rocks; 10 Leva Collector Coin	Ag 925°	10 Leva	4 000
	221.	2010	125 Years since the Union of Eastern Rumelia with the Bulgarian Principality; 10 Leva Collector Coin	Ag 925°	10 Leva	5 000
	222.	2010	200 Years since the Birth of Zahari Zograf; 2 Leva Collector Coin	Cu 999°	2 Leva	6 000
	223.	2010	Bulgarian Iconography • St. Naum; 100 Leva Collector Coin	Au 999°	100 Leva	3 000
	224.	2011	Zograf Monastery; 10 Leva Collector Coin	Ag 925°	10 Leva	6 000
	225.	2011	The Great Bulgarian Voices • Ghena Dimitrova; 10 Leva Collector Coin	Ag 999°	10 Leva	4 000
	226.	2011	Medieval Bulgarian Rulers • Khan Krum; 10 Leva Collector Coin	Ag 925°	10 Leva	5 000
	227.	2011	Bulgarian Folktales • Kosse Bosse; 5 Leva Collector Coin	Ag 500° - Coloured	5 Leva	6 000
	228.	2011	Bulgarian Iconography • Virgin Mary Wayshower; 20 Leva Collector Coin	Au 999°	20 Leva	6 000
	229.	2012	125 Years since the Birth of Dimcho Debelyanov; 2 Leva Collector Coin	Cu 999°	2 Leva	5 000
	230.	2012	Natural Phenomenon • Marvelous Bridges; 10 Leva Collector Coin	Ag 925°	10 Leva	4 000
	231.	2012	Bulgarian Folktales • The Lad and the wind 5 Leva Collector Coin	Ag 500° - Coloured	5 Leva	4 000
	232.	2012	Bulgarian Iconography • St. Petka of Bulgaria; 100 Leva Collector Coin	Au 999°	100 Leva	2 500
	233.	2012	250 Years Istoriya Slavyanobolgarskaya; 10 Leva Collector Coin	Ag 925°	10 Leva	4 000
	234.	2013	Medieval Bulgarian Rulers • Tsar Samuil; 10 Leva Collector Coin	Ag 925°	10 Leva	4 000
	235.	2013	Bulgarian Iconography • St. Constantine and St. Helena; 100 Leva Collector Coin	Au 999°	100 Leva	2 000
	236.	2013	110th Anniversary of the Ilinden–Preobrazhenie Uprising; 10 Leva Collector Coin	Ag 925°	10 Leva	3 000
	237.	2013	110 Years since the Birth of Zlatyu Boyadzhiev; 2 Leva Collector Coin	Cu 999°	2 Leva	4 000
	238.	2013	Bachkovo Monastery; 10 Leva Collector Coin	Ag 925°	10 Leva	3 000
	239.	2013	90 Years since the Birth of Apostol Karamitev; 2 Leva Collector Coin	Cu 999°	2 Leva	3 000
	240.	2014	Troyan Monastery; 10 Leva Collector Coin	Ag 925°	10 Leva	3 000
	241.	2014	Bulgarian Iconography • Prophet Elijah; 100 Leva Collector Coin	Au 999°	100 Leva	2 000
	242.	2014	Medieval Bulgarian Rulers • Tsar Simeon; 10 Leva Collector Coin	Ag 925°	10 Leva	3 000
	243.	2015	100 Years Cinema of Bulgaria; 10 Leva Collector Coin	Ag 925°	10 Leva	3 000
	244.	2015	100 Years Bulgarian aviation industry 10 Leva Collector Coin	Ag 925°	10 Leva	3 000
	245.	2015	130 Years since the Union of Eastern Rumelia with the Bulgarian Principality; 10 Leva Collector Coin	Ag 925°	10 Leva	3 000
	246.	2015	Bulgarian Iconography • Saint Menas; 100 Leva Collector Coin	Au 999°	100 Leva	2 000
	247.	2016	140 Years since the April Uprising,1876; 10 Leva Collector Coin	Ag 925°	10 Leva	3 000
	248.	2016	150 Years since the Birth of Pencho Slaveykov; 2 Leva Collector Coin	Cu 999°	2 Leva	2 000
	249.	2016	150 Years since the opening of the first Bulgarian railway line,1866 10 Leva Collector Coin	Ag 925°	10 Leva	3 000
	250.	2016	Exarch Anthim I 100 Leva Collector Coin	Au 999°	100 Leva	2 000
	251.	2016	Saint Clement of Ohrid	Ag 925°	10 Leva	3 000
	252.	2017	140 Years since the Birth of Elin Pelin; 2 Leva Collector Coin	Cu 999°	2 Leva	2 000
	253.	2017	150 Years • The bridge over Yantra River in Byala, built in 1867 by Kolyo Ficheto	Ag 925°	10 Leva	3 000
	254.	2017	Medieval Bulgarian Rulers • Khan Tervel; 10 Leva Collector Coin	Ag 925°	10 Leva	3 000
	255.	2017	Annunciation; 100 Leva Collector Coin	Au 999°	100 Leva	2 000
	256.	2017	Rila Monastery; 10 Leva Collector Coin	Ag 925°	10 Leva	3 000
	257.	2018	Bulgarian Presidency of the Council of the European Union, 2018	Ag 999°	10 Leva	3 000
	258.	2018	140 Years since the Liberation of Bulgaria; 10 Leva Collector Coin	Ag 925°	10 Leva	3 500
	259.	2018	The Old Elm Tree in Sliven; 10 Leva Collector Coin	Ag 925°	10 Leva	3 000
	260.	2018	Medieval Bulgarian Rulers • Ivan Assen II; 10 Leva Collector Coin	Ag 925°	10 Leva	3 000
	261.	2018	St. Stephen the Protomartyr; 100 Leva Collector Coin	Au 999°	100 Leva	2 000
	262.	2019	Plovdiv • European Capital of Culture; 10 Leva Collector Coin	Ag 925°	10 Leva	3 000
	263.	2019	Evlogi and Hristo Georgiev; 10 Leva Collector Coin	Ag 999°	10 Leva	3 000
	264.	2019	150 Years Bulgarian Academy of Sciences; 10 Leva Collector Coin	Ag 999°	10 Leva	3 000
	265.	2019	Dryanovo Monastery; 10 Leva Collector Coin	Ag 925°	10 Leva	3 000
Image	Nr.	Issued date	2020s	Metal composition	Value (BGN)	Mintage
	266.	2020	125 Years since the Birth of Geo Milev; 2 Leva Collector Coin	Cu 999°	2 Leva	3 000
	267.	2020	Kukeri; 10 Leva Collector Coin	Ag 999°	10 Leva	3 000
	268.	2020	100 Years University of National and World Economy; 10 Leva Collector Coin	Ag 999°	10 Leva	3 000
	269.	2020	Birth of Christ; 100 Leva Collector Coin	Au 999°	100 Leva	2 000
	270.	2021	200 Years since the Birth of Georgi Sava Rakovski; 10 Leva Collector Coin	Ag 999°	10 Leva	3 000
	271.	2021	Bulgarian Customs and Traditions • Nestinarstvo; 10 Leva Collector Coin	Ag 999°	10 Leva	3 000
	272.	2021	100 Years of National Academy of Music; 10 Leva Collector Coin	Ag 999°	10 Leva	3 000
	273.	2021	Medieval Bulgarian Rulers • Khan Omurtag; 10 Leva Collector Coin	Ag 925°	10 Leva	3 000
	274.	2021	150 Years since the Birth of Panayot Pipkov; 2 Leva Collector Coin	Cu 999°	2 Leva	3 000
	275.	2022	150 Years since the Birth of Gotse Delchev; 10 Leva Collector Coin	Ag 999°	10 Leva	3 000
	276.	2022	100 Years since the Birth of Stoyanka Mutafova; 2 Leva Collector Coin	Cu 999°	2 Leva	4 000
	277.	2022	Two Golden Leva Paìsiy Hilendàrski; 2 Leva Collector Coin	Au 999°	2 Leva	4 000
	278.	2022	Natural diversity of Bulgaria • Great crested grebe 10 Leva Collector Coin	Ag 999°	10 Leva	5 000
	279.	2022	Medieval Bulgarian Rulers • Tsar Kaloyan; 10 Leva Collector Coin	Ag 925°	10 Leva	5 000
	280.	2023	175 Years since the Birth of Hristo Botev; 10 Leva Collector Coin	Ag 999°	10 Leva	5 000

== See also ==
- Bulgarian lev
- Bulgarian Mint
- Bulgaria and the euro
