= Yim =

Yim may refer to:

- Im (Korean surname) (Korean: 임) a common Korean surname sometimes transliterated as Yim
- YIM or Yahoo! Messenger

== People with the surname ==
- Im Chung-sik (任), Korean general and former minister of defense, Republic of Korea
- Im Jong-seok (任), Korean politician
- Louise Yim (任), founder of Chung-Ang University
- Yim Jae-beom (任), Korean legendary singer
- Yim Sang A (林), Korean former pop star turned designer of handbags
- Yim Seulong (林), Korean teen pop idol
- Yim Ho (嚴), Hong Kong director
- Yim Wing-chun (嚴), legendary Chinese martial arts master, creator of Wing Chun
- Michelle Yim, (嚴), Hong Kong actress
- Jay Alan Yim, Chinese American composer
- Cheung-Koon Yim, Chinese-born Uruguayan architect

== See also ==
- Yan (disambiguation)
- Ran (disambiguation)
- Yam (disambiguation)
- Ren (disambiguation)
- Yim Dai (炎帝), Cantonese ruler name Yan Di
- Yim Tin Tsai (Tai Po District) (鹽田仔), an island of Hong Kong
- Yim Liu Ha (鹽寮下), Sha Tau Kok, Hong Kong
- Yim Ebbin syndrome, a congenital disorder
- Yim Yames or Jim James, guitarist
