= Bulgarian Mint =

Mint in Bulgaria

- Industry: Metalworking
- Founded: 28 July 1952; 74 years ago
- Headquarters: Sofia, Bulgaria
- Area served: Bulgaria
- Products: coins
- Parent: Bulgarian National Bank
- Website: mint.bg (in Bulgarian)

The Bulgarian Mint (Bulgarian: Монетен двор, romanized: Moneten dvor), established in 1952, is solely responsible for the production of legal tender coins in Bulgaria. It is owned by the Bulgarian National Bank.

The Bulgarian Mint has been producing Bulgarian euro coins since summer 2025. It also produces high quality gold and silver jubilees, medals, orders and other insignia of honour, necklaces, seals, mint collector sets and custom made badges, pins etc. The Mint is officially appointed to produce Bulgaria's orders and medals by the Presidency of the Republic of Bulgaria, the Ministries of Defence and Internal Affairs.

Together with the Bulgarian National Military Museum, the Mint hosts the Exhibition of Bulgarian Orders.

== See also ==
- Bulgarian euro coins
- Bulgarian lev
- Commemorative coins of Bulgaria
