= Ran (given name) =

- Pronunciation: ræn
- Gender: Unisex

Other names
- Related names: Lan; Rin

Ran is a given name and nickname which may refer to:

== Given name ==
- Ran Abukarat (רן אבוקרט, born 1988), Israeli retired footballer
- Ran Blake (born 1935), American pianist, composer and educator
- Ran Cohen (רן כהן, born 1937), Israeli politician
- Ran Dank (born 1982), Israeli classical pianist
- Ran Hirschl (רן הירשל, born 1963), Canadian political scientist and professor
- Ran Hwang (born 1960), South Korean artist
- Ran Itō (伊藤 蘭; born 1955), Japanese actress and member of the 1970s idol group Candies
- Ran Kadoch (רן קדוש, born 1985), Israeli football goalkeeper
- Ran Qiu (born 522 BC), disciple of Confucius
- Ran Raz (רָן רָז), Israeli computer scientist
- Ran Rol, Israeli footballer
- Ran Ronen-Pekker (1936–2016), Israeli Air Force brigadier general and fighter ace
- Sui Ran (睢冉, born 1992), Chinese basketball player
- Ran Sagiv (born 1997), Israeli Olympic triathlete
- Ran Takahashi (髙橋 藍; born 2001), Japanese volleyball player
- Ran Torten (רן טורטן, born 1966), Israeli Olympic competitive sailor
- Ran Vijay Singh (1932–1971), Indian Navy rear admiral
- Ran Wei, Chinese actress

== Nickname ==
- Ran Carthon (born 1981), American National Football League player
- Ran Danker (born 1984) Israeli actor, singer and model
- Ran Laurie (1915–1998), English physician and Olympic rowing champion, father of actor Hugh Laurie

== Fictional characters ==
- Ran Ayukawa, a character in the tokusatsu series B-Fighter Kabuto
- Ran Gotanda, a character in the light novel series Infinite Stratos
- Ran Haitani, a character in the manga and anime series Tokyo Revengers
- Ran Hanamichi, also known as Cure Yum-Yum, a character in the 2022 anime series Delicious Party Pretty Cure
- Ran Hanasaki, a character from Little Battlers Experience W, one of the three protagonists
- Ran Himeno, a character in the tokusatsu series Ohsama Sentai King-Ohger
- Ran Mitake, a character from the media franchise BanG Dream!
- Ran Mouri, a character in the manga and anime series Case Closed
- Ran Uzaki, a character in the tokusatsu series Juken Sentai Gekiranger
- Ran Yakumo, a character in Perfect Cherry Blossom from the video game series Touhou Project
