= GameSamba =

American video game publisher

- Industry: Online Game Publisher
- Headquarters: Lynnwood, Washington
- Website: https://www.gamesamba.com/

GameSamba is an American publisher of online games such as Star Trek: Alien Domain. Headquartered in Everett, Washington, GameSamba also operates offices in Hong Kong and Tokyo. In 2016, the company announced a strategic alliance with FUNimation, a content distributor specialized in bringing Japanese anime to North America.

== History ==
In 2015, GameSamba launched Star Trek: Alien Domain, an online strategy game, playable via web browser. It is an officially licensed Star Trek game published by GameSamba. It is set in the fluidic space where players can choose between two factions, the Klingon Empire and the United Federation of Planets.

In collaboration with the Japanese publishing company Kodansha, GameSamba is currently developing a browser game called Fairy Tail: Hero's Journey and a mobile game called Fairy Tail: Adventures, both based on the Japanese manga Fairy Tail. The development of a mobile game on the Japanese manga Attack on Titan was announced in March 2016.

The mobile game Tokyo Ghoul: Dark War, based on the Japanese seinen manga Tokyo Ghoul, is said to launch in 2018. The game is officially licensed by the Japanese animation studio Studio Pierrot.

== Notable games ==
- Star Trek: Alien Domain
- Fairy Tail: Hero's Journey
- Tokyo Ghoul: Dark War
- 18: Dream World
- Attack On Titan: Assault

=== Games no longer published by GameSamba ===
- Remnant Knights
- Jolly Grim
- Rainbow Saga
- Shadowland Online
- Cocolani Island
- Realms Online/Regnum Online/Champions of Regnum
- RAN Online
- Ragnarok Online
- Lady Popular
- Managore
- Khan Wars
- Tribal Trouble 2
