= Bulgarian lev =

Currency of Bulgaria from 1880 to 2025

български лев
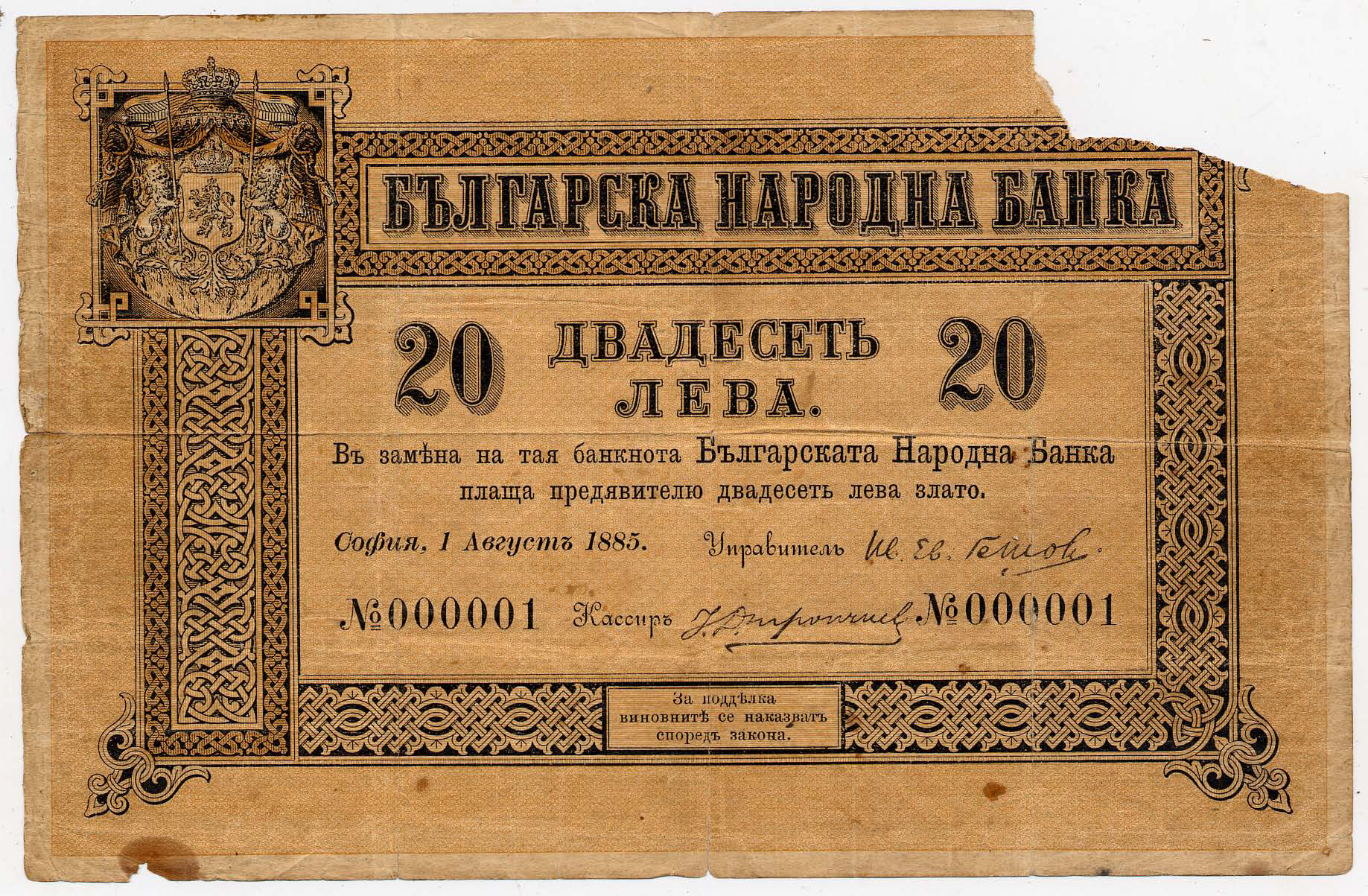
- The first Bulgarian banknote, 1885

ISO 4217
- Code: BGN
- Subunit: 0.01

Units of account
- Plural: levove, numeric: leva
- Symbol: The abbreviation лв. (lv.) is used
- Nickname: kint
- Subunit
- 1/100: stotinka
- Plural
- stotinka: stotinki
- Symbol
- stotinka: ст. (st.)

Denominations
- Banknotes
- Freq. used: 5, 10, 20, 50, 100 leva
- Rarely used: 1, 2 leva
- Coins
- Freq. used: 1, 2, 5, 10, 20, 50 st., 1 lev, 2 leva

Demographics
- Date of introduction: 4 June 1880
- Date of withdrawal: 31 December 2025
- Replaced by: Euro
- User(s): None, previously: Bulgaria

Issuance
- Central bank: Bulgarian National Bank
- Website: www.bnb.bg
- Printer: Bulgarian National Bank
- Website: https://www.bnbprint.com/en
- Mint: Bulgarian Mint, Sofia
- Website: mint.bg/en/

Valuation
- Inflation: 2.2%
- Method: Consumer price index (CPI)
- Pegged with: Euro (€) = 1.95583 leva

EU Exchange Rate Mechanism (ERM)
- Since: 10 July 2020
- Replaced by euro, non cash: 1 January 2026
- Replaced by euro, cash: 31 January 2026
- 1 € =: BGN 1.95583
- Band: 15.0% de jure; 0.0% de facto
- This infobox shows the latest status before this currency was rendered obsolete.

The lev (лев; plural: лева, левове; lev, leva, levove; ISO 4217 code: BGN) was the currency of Bulgaria from 1880 to 2025. The euro replaced the lev on 1 January 2026; during the cash changeover period (1–31 January 2026), the lev and the euro circulated in parallel for cash payments, and from 1 February 2026 the euro became the sole legal tender in Bulgaria.

The name lev derives from an archaic Bulgarian word meaning "lion" (modern лъв, lǎv, IPA: [ɫɤf]). The lev was subdivided into 100 stotinki (стотинки; singular: стотинка, stotinka); the term is derived from the Bulgarian word for "hundred" (сто, sto) and is modelled on the French centime. On Bulgarian euro coinage, the denominations below one euro use the inscriptions СТОТИНКА / СТОТИНКИ as the Bulgarian equivalent of "cent".

Under a currency board introduced in 1997, the lev was initially pegged to the Deutsche Mark (1,000 BGL = 1 DEM). In 1999, the lev was redenominated at 1000:1 with 1 new lev (1 BGN) equal to 1 DEM. Subsequently the peg was shifted to the euro at a fixed rate of 1 EUR = 1.95583 BGN. The lev joined the European Exchange Rate Mechanism (ERM II) on 10 July 2020 at the same rate until ultimately exiting both the ERM II and the currency board upon joining the Eurozone on 1 January 2026.

== Etymology ==
The currency's name comes from the archaic Bulgarian word "lev", which meant lion, just like the Romanian leu. In both cases, the lion refers to the Dutch thaler (leeuwendaalder "lion thaler/dollar"). The Dutch leeuwendaalder was imitated in several German and Italian cities, and these coins circulated in Romania, Moldova and Bulgaria and gave their name to their respective currencies: the Romanian leu, the Moldovan leu and the Bulgarian lev.

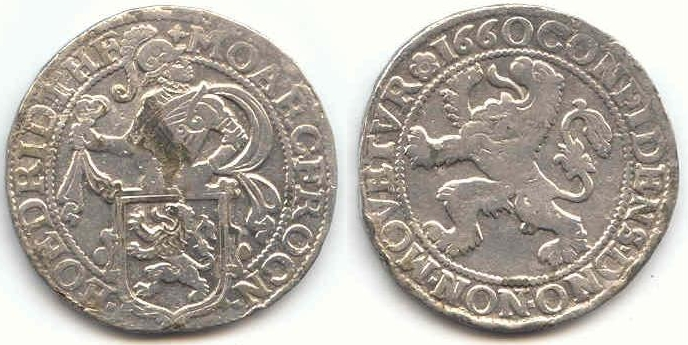
Dutch Thaler, depicting a lion, the origin of the Bulgarian "Lev"

Bulgarian national mythologising historiography has produced much content on the lion connection, presenting it as the national symbol of Bulgaria throughout centuries. Lions were common in the region until about 300 BC. In Bulgaria, the lion features in numerous historical monuments. The oldest images, found on slates in the city of Stara Zagora, date back to the 9th–10th century AD. A lion is depicted on The Madara Horseman – an impressive medieval rock relief carved into a towering rock plateau in north-eastern Bulgaria in the 7th or 8th century AD, which is on UNESCO's World Heritage List. In the Middle Ages, Bulgarian kings such as Ivan Shishman, one of the last rulers of the Second Bulgarian kingdom, celebrated the lion as a symbol of power.

In the time of Bulgarian national awakening in the years of Ottoman rule, the lion was considered and widely used as a major national symbol. Paisii of Hilendar, a discerning monk and a key Revival figure, mentioned in his ground-breaking tome Istorija Slavjanobolgarskaja that Bulgarians had a lion on their kings' royal seal: a symbol of the bravery, courage and invincibility of Bulgarian warriors, who fought "like lions."

Lion images on revolutionary flags, used in the 1876 April uprising, demonstrate that the lion continued to be considered as a national symbol. In the immediate period leading up to the revolt, revolutionary flags were made, featuring a golden lion rampant and the motto "Freedom or Death". Some of these flags, most often hand-made by local teachers or icon painters, have been preserved in Bulgarian museums to the present day. Most flags were made of green silk and had a painted or embroidered lion on them, in a heraldic posture and trampling over the Crescent – the symbol of the Ottoman Empire. The same image can be seen on other rebel-produced items such as hats and buttons. In Bulgarian folklore and Revival Literature, these lion depictions were called lion signs and associated with Bulgarian revolutionaries'.

== History ==
=== First lev (1881–1952) ===
The lev was introduced as Bulgaria's currency in 1881 with a value equal to the French franc. The gold standard was suspended between 1899 and 1906 and suspended again in 1912. Until 1916, Bulgaria's silver and gold coins were issued to the same specifications as those of the Latin Monetary Union. Banknotes issued until 1928 were backed by gold (leva zlato / zlatni, лева злато / златни) or silver (leva srebro / srebarni, лева сребро / сребърни).

In 1928, a new gold standard of 1 lev = 10.86956 mg gold was established.

During World War II, in 1940, the lev was pegged to the German Reichsmark at a rate of 32.75 leva = 1 Reichsmark. With the Soviet occupation in September 1944, the lev was pegged to the Soviet ruble at 15 leva = 1 ruble. A series of pegs to the U.S. dollar followed: 120 leva = 1 dollar in October 1945, 286.50 leva in December 1945 and 143.25 leva in March 1947. No coins were issued after 1943; only banknotes were issued until the currency reform of 1952.

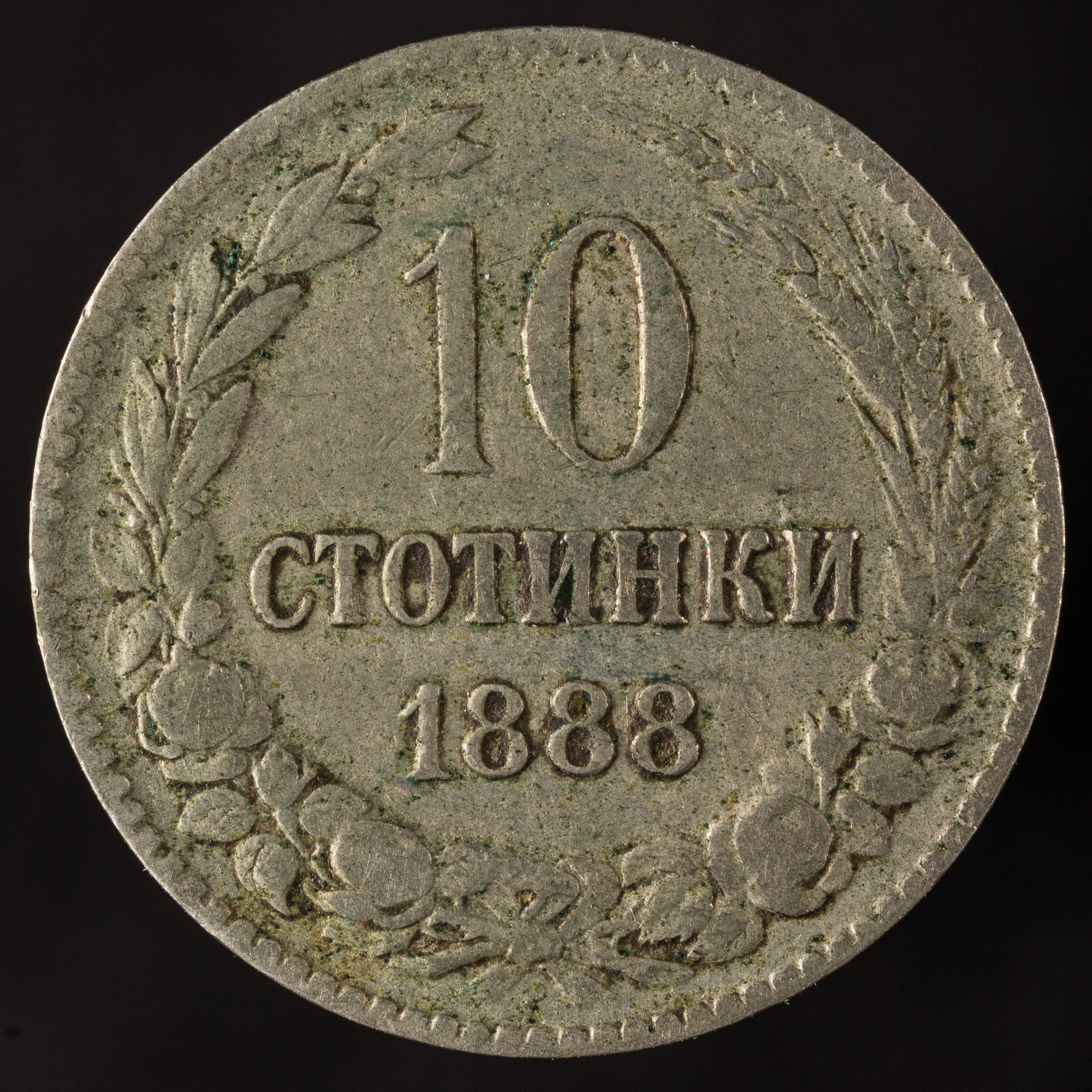
10 stotinki 1888

==== Coins ====
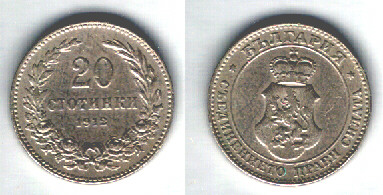
1912 20 stotinki

Between 1881 and 1884, bronze 2, 5, and 20 stotinki, and silver 50 stotinki, 1, 2, and 5 leva were introduced, followed, in 1888, by cupro-nickel 2 1/2, 5, 10, and 20 stotinki. Gold 10 and 20 leva were issued in 1894. Bronze 1 stotinka were introduced in 1901.

Production of silver coins ceased in 1916, with zinc replacing cupro-nickel in the 5, 10, and 20 stotinki in 1917. In 1923, aluminum 1 and 2 leva coins were introduced, followed by cupro-nickel pieces in 1925. In 1930, cupro-nickel 5 and 10 leva and silver 20, 50, and 100 leva were introduced, with silver coins issued until 1937, in which year aluminium-bronze 50 stotinki were issued.

In 1940, cupro-nickel 20 and 50 leva were issued, followed, in 1941, by iron 1, 2, 5, and 10 leva. In 1943, nickel-clad-steel 5, 10 and 50 leva were struck. These were the last coins issued for this version of the lev.

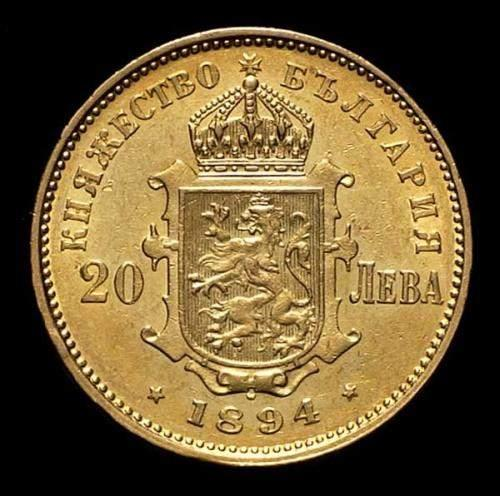
the gold 20 leva (1894)

==== Banknotes ====
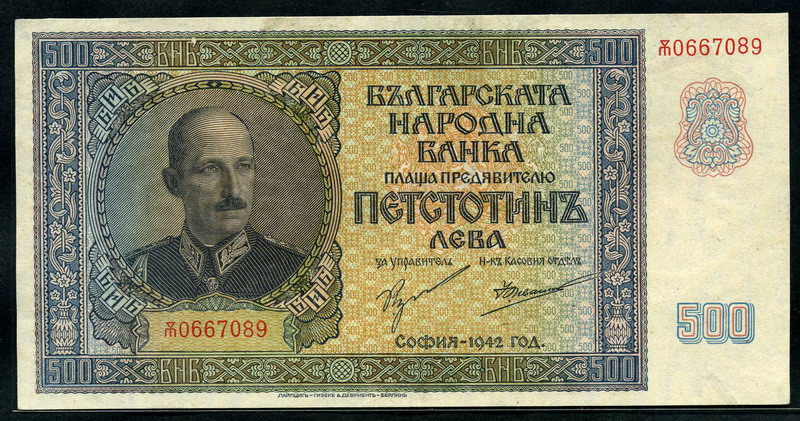
500 Leva banknote of 1942, Tsar Boris III

In 1885, the Bulgarian National Bank introduced notes for 20 and 50 gold leva, followed in 1887 by 100 gold leva and, in 1890, by 5 and 10 gold leva notes. In 1899, 5, 10 and 50 silver leva notes were issued, followed by 100 and 500 silver leva in 1906 and 1907, respectively. 500 gold leva notes were also introduced in 1907.

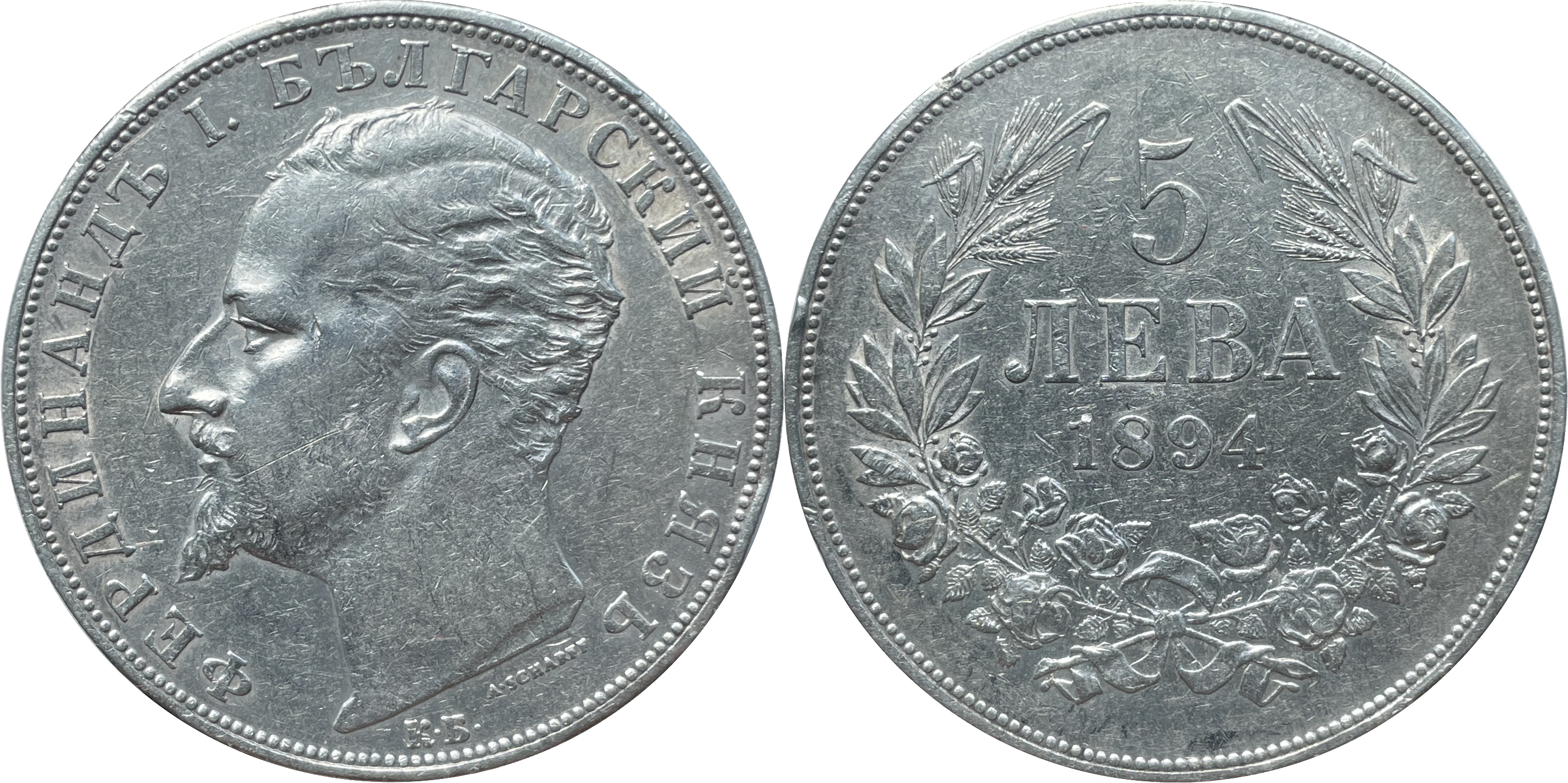
5 leva coin (1894)

In 1916, 1 and 2 silver leva and 1000 gold leva notes were introduced, followed by 2500 and 10,000 gold leva notes in 1919. In 1924, 5000 leva notes were issued, the first to lack a metal designation. In 1928, a new series of notes (dated 1922 and 1925) was introduced which gave the denominations solely in leva. Denominations introduced were 5, 10, 20, 50, 100, 500, 1000 and 5000 leva. These were followed in 1929 by 200 and 250 leva.

In 1930, coins up to 100 leva replaced notes, although 20-lev notes were issued between 1943 and 1950. Between 1943 and 1945, State Treasury Bills for 1000 and 5000 leva were issued.

=== Second lev (1952–1962) ===
In 1952, following wartime inflation, a new lev replaced the original lev at a rate of 1 "new" lev = 100 "old" leva. However the rate for banking accounts was different, ranging from 100:3 to 200:1. Prices for goods were replaced at a rate of 25:1. The new lev was pegged to the U.S. dollar at a rate of 6.8 leva = 1 dollar, falling to 9.52 leva on July 29, 1957.

==== Coins ====
In 1952, coins (dated 1951) were introduced in denominations of 1, 3, 5, 10 and 25 stotinki, with the lower three denominations in brass and the higher two in cupro-nickel. Shortly after, cupro-nickel 20 stotinki coins dated 1952 were also issued, followed by 50 stotinki in 1959 and 1 lev in 1960 which replaced the 1 lev note (both also in cupro-nickel). All stotinki coins feature a head of wheat around denomination on the reverse and state emblem on the obverse, while the lev coin depicts an olive branch wreath around the denomination.

==== Banknotes ====
In 1952, state notes (dated 1951) were issued in 1, 3 and 5 leva, together with notes of the National Bank for 10, 25, 50, 100 and 200 leva. 500-lev notes were printed but not issued. 1 lev notes were withdrawn after the introduction of a coin in 1960. 1, 3, and 5 leva depict the state emblem, while all denominations 10 leva and up depict Georgi Dimitrov, who had a post-mortem cult of personality built up around him by that time period. The reverse side of 1 lev, 3 and 5 leva notes depict hands holding up the hammer and sickle, while higher denominations each depict workers at various trades.

=== Third lev (1962–1999) ===
Lev
ISO 4217
- Code: earlier codes: BGJ, BGK, BGL

In 1962, another redenomination took place at the rate of 10 to 1, setting the exchange rate at 1.17 leva = 1 U. S. dollar, with the tourist rate falling to 2 leva on February 1, 1964. The ISO 4217 code was BGL. After this, the lev remained fairly stable for almost three decades. However, like other Communist countries' currencies, it was not freely convertible for Western funds. Consequently, black market rates were five to ten times higher than the official rate. During the period, until 1989 the lev was backed by gold, and the banknotes have the text stating: "The bank note is backed by gold and all assets of the bank" (Bulgarian: "Банкнотата е обезпечена със злато и всички активи на банката").

After the fall of communism, Bulgaria experienced several episodes of drastic inflation and currency devaluation. In order to change this, in 1997, the lev was pegged to the Deutsche Mark, with 1,000 leva equal to 1 DM (one lev equal to 0.1 pfennig).

Since 1997, Bulgaria had been in a system of a currency board, and all Bulgarian currency in circulation was completely backed by the foreign exchange reserves of the Bulgarian National Bank (BNB).

==== Coins ====
In 1962, aluminum-bronze 1, 2, and 5 stotinki, and nickel-brass 10, 20 and 50 stotinki and 1 lev were introduced. The coin series strongly resembles coinage from the Soviet Union during the same period, particularly in design and size.

The state emblem is depicted on the obverse of all coins, which went through several changes. The first change in 1962 with the introduction of the new coinage, and the second change in 1974, with the ribbons being the most noticeable change.

A number of commemorative 2 leva coins also circulated during this period, often released into circulation as they had relatively high production numbers and little collector's value. Higher denomination lev coins have also been introduced into circulation at an irregular basis with varying sizes and metallic compositions, including silver. Mostly due to an overstock of numismatic coins not getting sold to collectors. Similar occurrences to this can be seen with high denomination coins from East Germany and Poland during the same period.

Communist era coins
Image	Denomination	Diameter	Weight	Composition	Obverse	Reverse	Minted Year
	1 stotinka	15.2 mm	1 g	Brass	Coat of Arms	Denomination and date	1951-1990
	2 stotinki	18.1 mm	2 g	Brass	Coat of Arms	Denomination and date	1951-1990
	3 stotinki	19.8 mm	2.4 g	Brass	Coat of Arms	Denomination and date	1951-1990
	5 stotinki	22.35 mm	3.1 g	Brass	Coat of Arms	Denomination and date	1951-1990
	10 stotinki	17.1 mm	1.8 g	Nickel-brass and copper-nickel	Coat of Arms	Denomination and date	1951-1990
	20 stotinki	21.2 mm	2.9 g	Nickel-brass and copper-nickel	Coat of Arms	Denomination and date	1951-1990
	25 stotinki	22 mm	3.3 g	Nickel-brass and copper-nickel	Coat of Arms	Denomination and date	1951-1990
	50 stotinki	23.3 mm	4.2 g	Nickel-brass and copper-nickel	Coat of Arms	Denomination and date	1951-1990
	1 lev	24 mm	4.8 g	Nickel-brass and copper-nickel	Coat of Arms	Denomination and date	1951-1990

===== Post-communist coins =====
In 1992, after the communist era, older coins were withdrawn and a new coinage was introduced in denominations of 10, 20 and 50 stotinki, 1, 2, 5 and 10 leva. All were struck in nickel-brass except for the cupro-nickel 10 leva. In 1997, nickel-brass 10, 20 and 50 leva were introduced.

==== Banknotes ====
In 1962, the National Bank issued notes for 1, 2, 5, 10 and 20 leva. A second series, in the same denominations, was issued in 1974. 50 leva notes were introduced in 1990. Again, denominations 10 leva and up featured Georgi Dimitrov, 1, 2, and 5 featured the state emblem. After the fall of the communist regime, new notes were introduced for 20, 50, 100 and 200 leva. These were followed by 500 leva notes in 1993, 1000 and 2000 leva in 1994, 5000 and 10,000 leva in 1996 (re-released with new design and look in 1997), and 50,000 leva in 1997. Furthermore, two new banknotes of 20,000 and 100,000 leva were scheduled to be introduced in 1997 and 1998, but their production was cancelled following the introduction of currency board in 1997.

=== Fourth lev (1999–2025) ===
On 5 July 1999 the lev was redenominated at 1000:1 with 1 new lev equal to 1 Deutsche Mark. The ISO 4217 currency code for the new Bulgarian lev is BGN. The lev is pegged at €1 = 1.95583 leva (previously DEM 1 = BGN 1, continuing the fixed exchange rate from the third lev).

==== Coins ====
In 1999, coins in denominations of 1, 2, 5, 10, 20 and 50 stotinki were introduced. A 1 lev coin replaced the 1 lev banknote in 2002, and a 2 leva coin replaced the 2 leva banknote in 2015.

Coins of the fourth lev (1999–2025)
Image	Value	Equivalent in euros	Technical Parameters			Description			Date of			
Image	Value	Equivalent in euros	Diameter	Mass	Composition	Edge	Obverse	Reverse	minting	Issue	Withdrawal	Lapse
	1 stotinka	€0.005	16 mm	1.8g	1999 - CuAlNi; 2000 - Steel covered with bronze	Plain	Value, year, twelve stars as symbol of Europe.	Country name, Madara Rider	1999; 2000	5 July 1999	31 January 2026	Indefinitely
	2 stotinki	€0.010	18 mm	2.5 g	1999 - CuAlNi; 2000 - Steel covered with bronze	Plain	Value, year, twelve stars as symbol of Europe.	Country name, Madara Rider	1999; 2000	5 July 1999	31 January 2026	Indefinitely
	5 stotinki	€0.025	20 mm	3.5 g	1999 - CuAlNi; 2000 - Steel covered with bronze	Plain	Value, year, twelve stars as symbol of Europe.	Country name, Madara Rider	1999; 2000	5 July 1999	31 January 2026	Indefinitely
	10 stotinki	€0.051	18.5 mm	3.0 g	CuNiZn	reeded	Value, year, twelve stars as symbol of Europe.	Country name, Madara Rider	1999	5 July 1999	31 January 2026	Indefinitely
	20 stotinki	€0.102	20.5 mm	4.0 g	CuNiZn	reeded	Value, year, twelve stars as symbol of Europe.	Country name, Madara Rider	1999	5 July 1999	31 January 2026	Indefinitely
	50 stotinki	€0.255	22.5 mm	5.0 g	CuNiZn	reeded	Value, year, twelve stars as symbol of Europe.	Country name, Madara Rider	1999	5 July 1999	31 January 2026	Indefinitely
	1 lev	€0.511	24.5 mm	7.0 g	Bimetallic: copper-nickel center in brass ring	Alternating smooth and reeded segments	Value, year, graphical pattern of two crossing lines.	Country name, saint Ivan Rilski	2002	2 September 2002	31 January 2026	Indefinitely
	2 leva	€1.022	26.5 mm	9.0 g	Bimetallic: nickel brass center in copper-nickel ring	Segmented reeding	Value, year, graphical pattern of two crossing lines.	Country name, Paisius of Hilendar	2015	7 December 2015	31 January 2026	Indefinitely
These images are to scale at 2.5 pixels per millimetre. For table standards, see the coin specification table.

===== Commemorative coins =====
In 2004, 2005, and 2007, commemorative circulation issues were struck of the 50 stotinki coin. In 2018, a commemorative circulation issue of the 2 leva coin was issued. These coins were not found in general circulation.

Many commercial commemorative coins have also been minted.

==== Banknotes ====
In 1999, banknotes were introduced in denominations of 1, 2, 5, 10, 20, and 50 leva. 100 leva notes were added in 2003. The 1 and 2 leva notes were later replaced by coins of similar value and withdrawn from circulation.

Banknotes of the fourth lev (1999–2026)
Image		Value	Equivalent in euros	Dimensions	Description			Date of			
Obverse	Reverse	Value	Equivalent in euros	Dimensions	Obverse	Reverse	Watermark	Printing	Issue	Withdrawal	Lapse
		1 lev	€0.511	112 × 60 mm	Ivan Rilski	Rila Monastery	Rampant lion	1999	5 July 1999	1 January 2016	Indefinitely
		2 leva	€1.022	116 × 64 mm	Paisiy Hilendarski	Istoriya Slavyanobolgarskaya	Rampant lion	1999; 2005	5 July 1999	1 January 2021	Indefinitely
		5 leva	€2.556	121 × 67 mm	Ivan Milev	Paintings by Ivan Milev	Ivan Milev	1999; 2009; 2020	5 July 1999	31 January 2026	Indefinitely
		10 leva	€5.112	126 × 70 mm	Petar Beron	Astronomical instruments	Petar Beron	1999; 2008; 2020	5 July 1999	31 January 2026	Indefinitely
		20 leva	€10.225	131 × 73 mm	Stefan Stambolov	Orlov most, Lavov most	Stefan Stambolov	1999; 2005; 2007; 2020	5 July 1999	31 January 2026	Indefinitely
		50 leva	€25.564	136 × 76 mm	Pencho Slaveykov	Poems by Pencho Slaveykov	Pencho Slaveykov	1999; 2006; 2019	5 July 1999	31 January 2026	Indefinitely
		100 leva	€51.129	141 × 79 mm	Aleko Konstantinov	Aleko Konstantinov; his work "Bay Ganyo"	Aleko Konstantinov	2003; 2018	8 December 2003	31 January 2026	Indefinitely
These images are to scale at 0.7 pixel per millimetre (18 pixel per inch). For table standards, see the banknote specification table.

==== Euro adoption ====
The euro officially replaced the Bulgarian lev on 1 January 2026, but the lev could be used for cash payments until 31 January 2026 alongside the euro. The Bulgarian National Bank (BNB) will continue to exchange free of charge any remaining lev banknotes and coins indefinitely.

== See also ==
- Economy of Bulgaria
- Adoption of the euro in Bulgaria
- Bulgarian euro coins
- Commemorative coins of Bulgaria
- Medieval Bulgarian coinage
- Moldovan leu
- Romanian leu

== Notes ==
- Krause, Chester L.; Clifford Mishler (1991). Standard Catalog of World Coins: 1801–1991 (18th ed.). Krause Publications. ISBN 0873411501.
- Pick, Albert (1994). Bruce, Colin R. II; Shafer, Neil (eds.). Standard Catalog of World Paper Money: General Issues (7th ed.). Krause Publications. ISBN 0-87341-207-9.
