= Madara (village) =

Madara Мадара
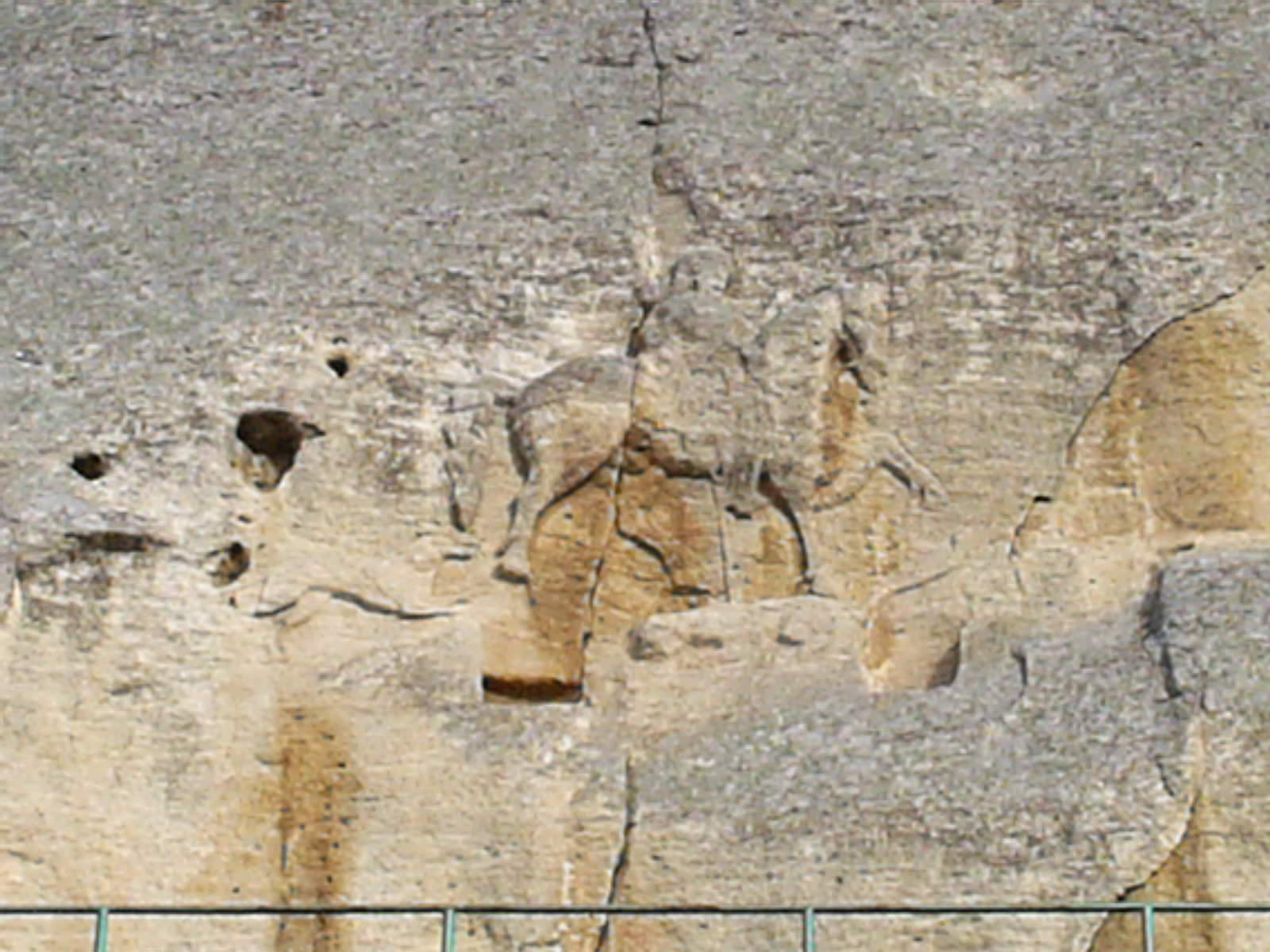
- The Madara Rider

- Location of Madara
- Coordinates: 43°17′N 27°6′E
- Country: Bulgaria
- Provinces (Oblast): Shumen

Government
  - Mayor: Hristina Dimitrova
- Elevation: 203 m (666 ft)

Population (2008)
  - Total: 1,299
- Time zone: UTC+2 (EET)
  - Summer (DST): UTC+3 (EEST)
- Postal Code: 9971
- Area code: 05313

Madara (Bulgarian: Мадара, pronounced [ˈmadɐrɐ]) is a village in northeastern Bulgaria, part of Shumen municipality, Shumen Province. Madara lies 15 kilometres (9.3 mi) east of the city of Shumen, at the western foot of the Madara plateau.

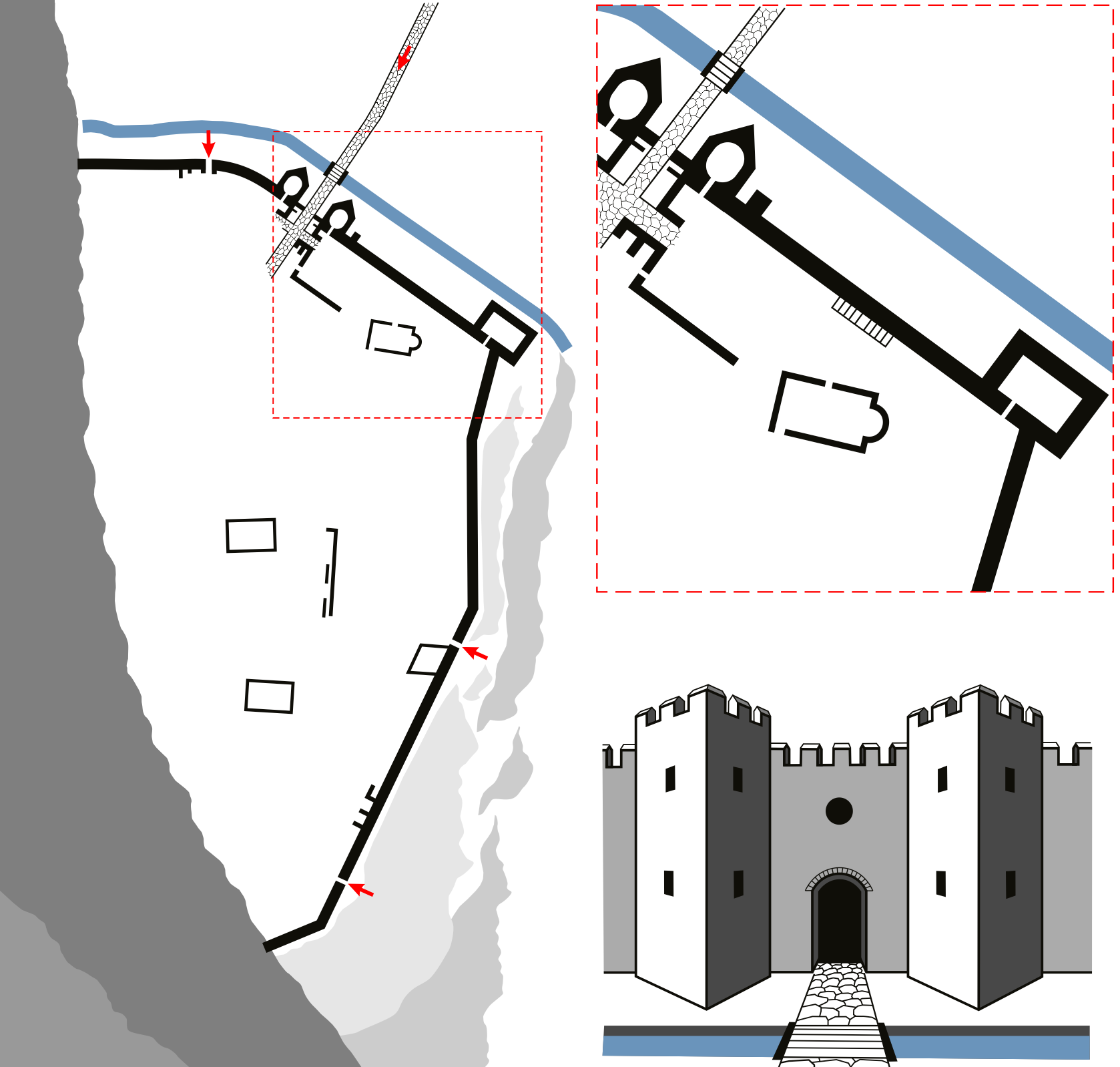
Plan of the medieval fortress Madara

Madara is famous for the Madara National Historical and Archaeological Reserve 1.5 km (0.93 mi) east of the village, one of the 100 Tourist Sites of Bulgaria. The reserve includes Neolithic and Eneolithic findings, a Thracian settlement, Ancient Roman villa and fortress from the 2nd–5th century, medieval Bulgarian palace, pagan sanctuaries, Christian churches and monasteries and fortresses from the First Bulgarian Empire. There is also a cave monastery from the 12th–14th century. Most importantly, Madara is the location of the famous Madara Rider, an early medieval (early 8th-century) large rock relief carved by the Bulgars and also featuring several epigraphs of historic importance written in Medieval Greek; the relief most likely dates to the reign of Tervel of Bulgaria.

The large Roman villa may have been at the centre of an imperial estate under the Principate. The villa was damaged in the 3rd century and was partially rebuilt in the 4th. This later phase included at least one horreum (granary) built against the north precinct wall and included a wine press and dolia (storage jars), showing that it was used for wine production. The buildings were destroyed and abandoned in the late 4th or early 5th century.

The archaeological reserve was first studied by the Hungarian archaeologist Géza Fehér and then by the Czech-Bulgarian Karel Škorpil and the Bulgarian Rafail Popov.

In medieval times, the village was a Bulgarian fortress named Matora. It was mentioned in Ottoman registers of 1481 as Matara. The modern village was founded by settlers from nearby Kyulevcha close to Kaspichan after the Liberation of Bulgaria; in the 1940s and 1950s, settlers from the Pirin and Sofia regions arrived.
