= Remote area nurse (Australia) =

A Remote Area Nurse (RAN) is a nurse working in remote or isolated areas of Australia, where population density and remoteness preclude the provision of permanent doctors. A RAN may be employed in various settings, including remote indigenous communities, mine sites and remote townships.

== Scope of practice ==
RANs are considered generalists within their practice. They are expected to be able competently to assess and provide clinical care across the life spectrum, from birth through to death, and be able to assess and treat a wide range of medical conditions effectively. As a RAN's work location may be isolated and remote, and may have limited or non-existent medical support, they often assume an extended scope of practice.

Skills may include advanced life support (ALS), prescription and supply of medicines, suturing, child birth, nurse immuniser status, performing x-rays, provision of ambulance services including receiving emergency calls (000), and airstrip preparation. Furthermore, when clinical situations are dire, a RAN may be able to perform emergency life saving manoeuvres, usually reserved for medical practitioners, such as laryngeal mask airway (LMA) insertion, intubation, needle cricothyroidotomy, needle chest decompression and chest drain insertion.

In place of a medical practitioner, a RAN generally operates within predefined standard operating orders, such as those contained within the remote primary healthcare manuals (CARPA).

== Television ==
A 2006 television programme was based on the life of a RAN in the Torres Strait islands.
