= Ran Wei (actress) =

Chinese American actor

Ran Wei (魏苒)
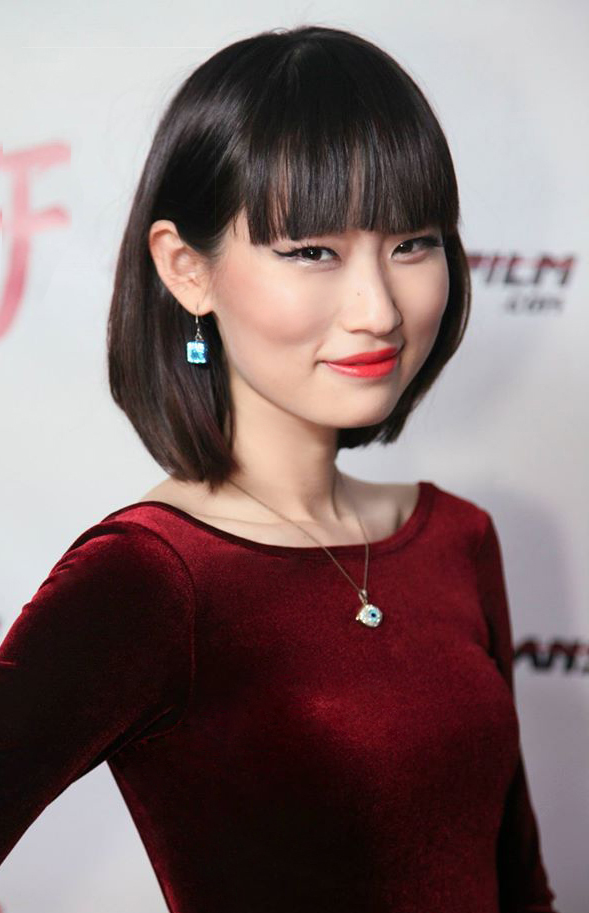
- Born: Ran Wei (魏苒); Zhengzhou, China
- Occupations: Actress, Model
- Website: ranwei.net

Ran Wei
- Chinese: 魏苒
Transcriptions
Standard Mandarin
- Hanyu Pinyin: Wèi Rǎn

Ran Wei (Chinese: 魏苒) is an American actress and fashion model of Chinese descent. She is best known for her role as Vivian Liu in Switch and as Soo Chin in How to Survive High School.

== Early life ==
Wei was born in Zhengzhou, China. Wei moved to the United States when she was 16 years old to live with her parents in the San Francisco Bay Area.

== Career ==
Wei was discovered by a talent scout while working in a clothing store and appeared in many commercials before relocating to Los Angeles to further pursue her acting career. She has continued to do work that appears both in the US and China, including commercials for Apple for the English and Mandarin market, which garnered the attention of the Chinese newspaper World Journal, the US's largest Chinese newspaper, and CCTV, China's predominant state television broadcaster. She is the cover model on the first anniversary issue of Faddy Magazine and featured inside with an exclusive interview about her life and career. The Visual Effects Society also invited Ran to present awards, including a Lifetime Achievement Award to Ridley Scott, and a Visionary Award to Syd Mead, for their 14th Annual VES Awards.

In 2020, Ran joined as C4 for the Amazon Prime Tv Show Cyborgs Universe.

== Filmography ==
=== Television ===
Year	Title	Role	Notes
2014	Cupid's Conundrum	Stephanie	TV mini-series
2015	How To Survive High School	Soo Chin	TV series
2016	14th Annual VES Awards	Trophy Presenter (Self)	TV Awards Show
2020	Cyborgs Universe	C4	TV series

=== Film ===
Year	Title	Role	Notes
2014	Ice Cream Sunday	Fantasy Girl	Short Film
2016	The Moneychangers	Moral Hazard	Documentary
2019	Fatale Collective: Bleed	Sophia (segment "The Safe Space")	Short Film
2020	The Purple Iris	Lily	Short Film
2022	Switch	Vivian Liu	Feature Film
2022	Black Ice VR	A.I.	VR
2024	10 Things About Sally	Tammy Tam	Feature Film
2024	Learning English	Actress	Short Film

== Awards and nominations ==
=== FilmQuest ===
Year	Nominee / work	Award	Result	Ref.
2019	Fatale Collective: Bleed	Best Ensemble Cast	Nominated	
