= Bulgarian National Bank =

Central bank of Bulgaria

Coordinates: 42°41′47″N 23°19′31″E

Bulgarian National Bank Българска народна банка Bulgarska narodna banka

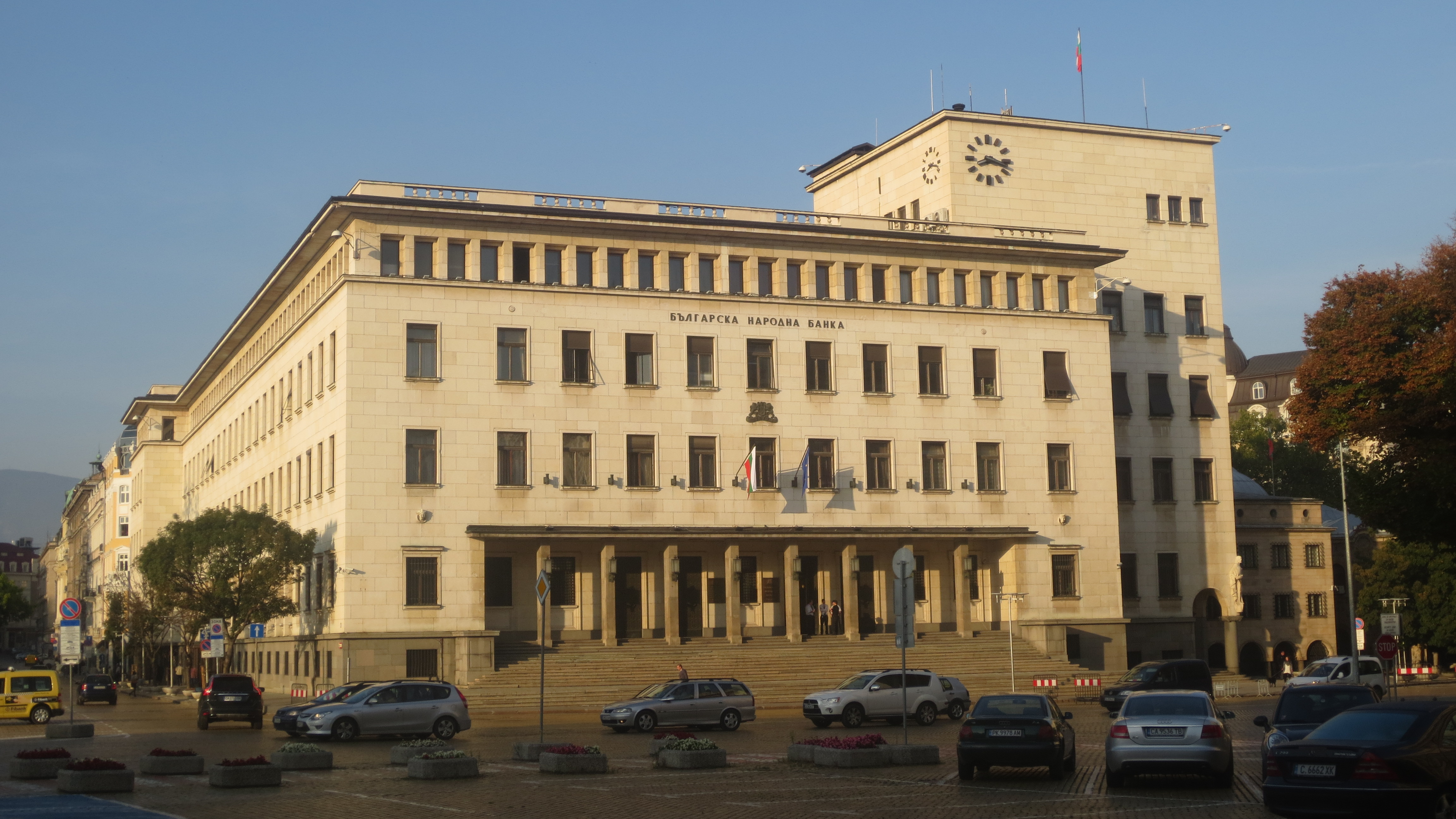
- Bulgarian National Bank headquarters in Sofia
- Central bank of: Bulgaria
- Headquarters: Sofia
- Established: 25 January 1879; 147 years ago
- Ownership: 100% state ownership
- Governor: Dimitar Radev
- Currency: Euro; EUR (ISO 4217)
- Reserves: US$19.9 billion
- Succeeded by: European Central Bank (2026)^{1}
- Website: www.bnb.bg?toLang=_EN
- ^{1} The Bulgarian national bank still exists but many functions have been taken over by the ECB.

The Bulgarian National Bank (Bulgarian: Българска народна банка, romanized: Bulgarska narodna banka, IPA: [ˈbɤɫɡɐrskɐ nɐˈrɔdnɐ ˈbaŋkɐ], BNB) is the national central bank for Bulgaria within the Eurosystem. Before the country adopted the euro on 1 January 2026, it was responsible for issuing the former national currency, the lev.

Headquartered in Sofia, the bank was established in 1879. It is the 13th-oldest continuously existing central bank in the world. The bank has a key role in the Bulgarian economy. An independent institution responsible for issuing all banknotes and coins in the country, BNB is tasked with safekeeping the government's currency reserves. It is also the sole owner of the Bulgarian Mint.

In addition to its monetary role, the BNB is also a financial supervisory authority. In that capacity, it increasingly implements policies set at the European Union level. It has been the national competent authority for Bulgaria within European Banking Supervision since 2020. It is a voting member of the Board of Supervisors of the European Banking Authority (EBA). It is Bulgaria's designated National Resolution Authority and plenary session member of the Single Resolution Board (SRB). It provides the permanent single common representative for Bulgaria in the Supervisory composition of the General Board of the Anti-Money Laundering Authority (AMLA). It is also a member of the European Systemic Risk Board (ESRB).

== History ==
=== Establishment and early development ===
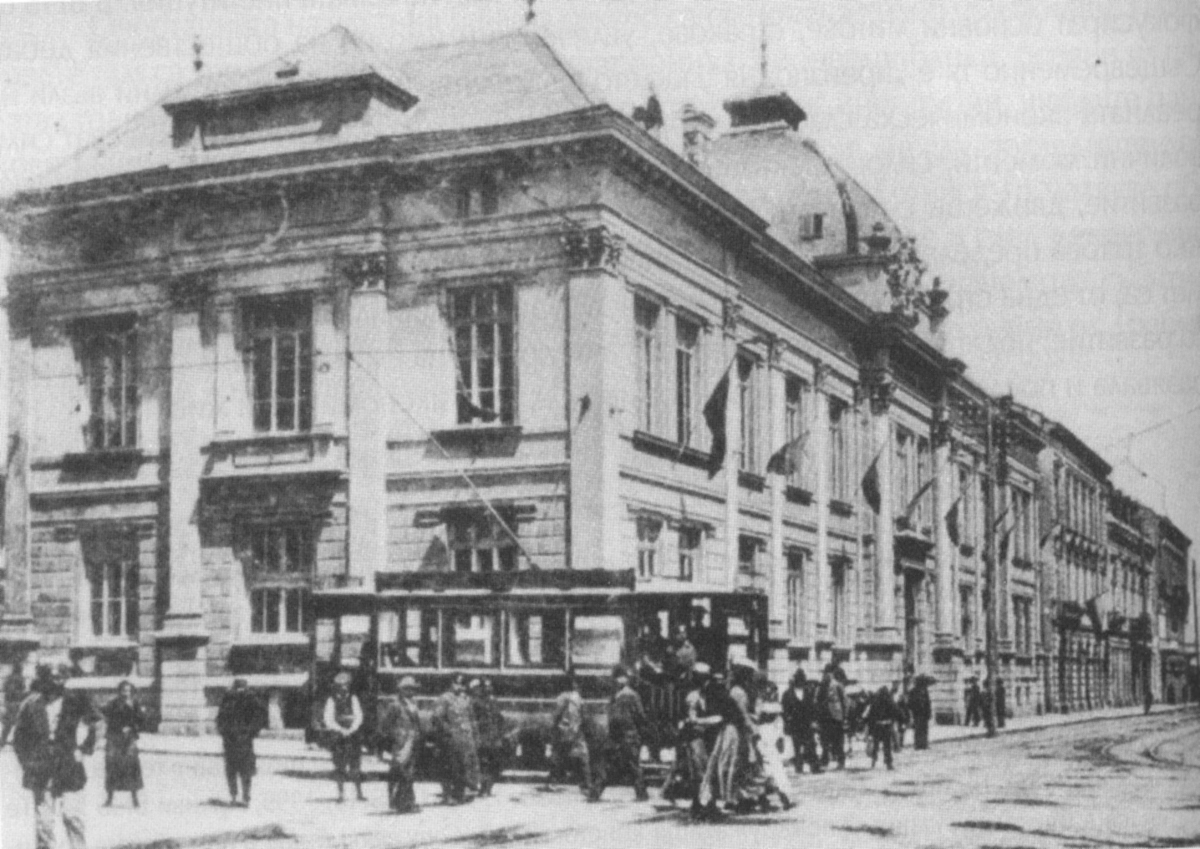
The original BNB headquarters, c. 1910

On 25 January 1879, the Russian Imperial Commissar in Bulgaria, Knyaz Alexander Dondukov-Korsakov, approved the Charter of the Bulgarian National Bank. On 4 April 1879, the first BNB Governor was appointed, on 23 May the Bank was officially opened, and on 6 June it carried out its first banking operation. The Law on the right to mint coins in the Principality was passed in 1880, and it instituted the Bulgarian national currency, the Lev. The following year, Bulgaria minted its first coins of 2, 5 and 10 stotinki.

Initially, the BNB was a state-owned central bank, subject to the oversight of the Minister of Finance, which serviced the state budget and the cash activities of the Government and carried out banking transactions typical of a commercial bank, without having the right to print or introduce banknotes into circulation. The Law on the foundation of the BNB and the new Charter, both passed in 1885, reorganised the Bank, granting it monopoly of note issue. Later in the same year, the Bank issued the first Bulgarian banknotes.

=== War period (1912–1918) and aftermath ===
By the outbreak of the Balkan War (1912), the BNB gained much experience as a bank of issue and strengthened its independence. Apart from being the major lending centre in Bulgaria, it became the regulator of the monetary system, clearing the cash circulation of foreign coins and coping with the serious money crisis in Bulgaria in the late 19th century and with the consequences of the European money crisis in the early years of the 20th century.

During the wars (1912–1918) the BNB was forced to almost limitlessly lend to the Government and increase the note issue and the amount of notes in circulation. The Bulgarian Lev came out of the wars strongly depreciated, and during the decade afterward the Bank made efforts to restore its value.

=== Interwar stabilization and World War II ===
In 1928, Bulgaria was granted a large "Stabilisation Loan" coordinated by the Economic and Financial Organization of the League of Nations. This was intended to stabilize the Lev, to reinforce the capital stock of the BNB, and to liquidate the Government's debt to the Bank. Two new laws were passed for the same purpose – the Law on the BNB, which made the most profound institutional changes to the Bank (it became a real central bank of issue free of any activities untypical of this type of bank), and the Law on the stabilisation of the Lev and on coinage, which established a gold standard in Bulgaria whereby 92 Leva equalled 1 gram of pure gold.

All these steps supported the Bank's business during the years of the Great Depression (1929–1933). From the mid-1930s till Bulgaria entered the Second World War in 1941 the BNB went through a revival. At that time, the building of the Bank was constructed, which houses it to the present day.

During the Second World War, the BNB was compelled again to lend to the Government and deal with the depreciation of the Lev.

=== Communist era ===
The 1947 Law on Banks carried out a drastic reform: private banks were nationalized and the banking system was transformed on the Soviet model, and thus operated until the late 1980s. The BNB was entrusted to provide all financial services to the newly created overcentralized planned economy. The Bank too was obliged to directly lend to the Government and the economy, being directly subordinated to the Council of Ministers and the Minister of Finance.

In 1952, the Bulgarian Mint was set up and it started minting circulation and commemorative coins.

=== Since 1990 ===
The return of the Bulgarian banking system to the market economy principles and of the BNB to the independent central bank principles became possible only in 1991 when two basic laws came into effect – the Commerce Law, which brought back the legal foundations of commercial banking, and the new Law on the BNB, which restored the Bank's autonomy and gave it the responsibility for supervising banks. In 1997 another Law on the BNB superseded the previous one; it reorganized the monetary system, and from 1 July a currency board arrangement was put in place. At first, the Bulgarian Lev was pegged to the Deutsche Mark, and from 1999 – to the Euro, at the rate of 1.95583 Leva for 1 Euro. Later in the same year the Bulgarian Lev was re-denominated.

In 1998, the Bulgarian Printing House was opened for business, and it began the production of banknotes and bonds with a very high level of security.

In 2005, amendments were made to the Law on the BNB, which ensured the institutional, functional, financial and personal independence of the BNB, changed the core purpose of the Bank, and expressly prohibited the central bank from providing funding to public institutions.

On 1 January 2007, Bulgaria joined the European Union, and ever since the BNB has been a member of the European System of Central Banks.

== Operations ==
The bank is organized into three departments:

- Issue Department, responsible for maintaining the full foreign exchange coverage of the total amount of monetary liabilities, i.e. the issuance of national currency
- Banking Department, which, in case of systemic risk, acts as the lender of last resort. It also administers the currency board, introduced in Bulgaria in 1997
- Supervision Department, which oversees the country's banking system.

== Head office building ==
The Bulgarian National Bank's headquarters in Sofia are located on the central Battenberg Square. The current edifice was commissioned to renowned architects Ivan Vasilyov and Dimitar Tsolov and built between 1934 and 1939. Its architectural style, Stripped Classicism, was frequently chosen for banks and government buildings in the interwar era as it combined elements of stability and authority on one hand with modernity on the other. The building spreads over an area of 3,700 m^{2} and has four overground and three underground storeys. Its interior is the work of Ivan Penkov and Dechko Uzunov.

== Governors ==
- Ludovig Carbonneur, acting, 4 April 1879 – 1 July 1879
- Georgi Zheliazkovich, 1 July 1879 – 27 April 1881
- Tsidor Mihailovich, acting, 27 April 1881 – 11 October 1883
- Ivan Evstratiev Geshov, 1 December 1883 – 26 August 1886
- Dimitar Popov, acting, 26 August 1886 – 4 December 1887
- Mihail Tenev, acting, 4 December 1887 – 1 January 1894
- Mihail Tenev, 1 January 1894 – 19 January 1899
- Stefan Karadjov, acting, 19 January 1899 – 1 March 1899
- Stefan Karadjov, 1 March 1899 – 1 October 1905
- Boncho Boev, 23 February 1906 – 7 August 1908
- Hristo Chakalov, 7 August 1908 – 12 June 1920
- Boyan Damyanov, 16 July 1920 – 30 September 1922
- Dobri Bozhilov, acting, 1 December 1922 – 31 March 1923
- Iliya Karadjov, 26 March 1923 – 8 June 1923
- Dobri Bozhilov, acting, 1 December 1923 – 1 March 1924
- Kosta Bojadjiev, 21 September 1924 – 16 January 1926
- Asen Ivanov, 18 January 1926 – 29 August 1931
- Dobri Bozhilov, acting, 29 August 1931 – 29 February 1932
- Nikola Momchilov, 29 February 1932 – 31 July 1934
- Dobri Bozhilov, acting, 2 August 1934 – 4 February 1935
- Marko Ryaskov, 4 February 1935 – 21 April 1935
- Dobri Bozhilov, 25 April 1935 – 14 November 1938
- Kiril Gunev, acting, 14 November 1938 – 1 June 1944
- Dobri Bozhilov, 1 June 1944 – 10 August 1944
- Kiril Gunev, 10 August 1944 – November 1944
- Ivan Stefanov, acting, 23 December 1944 – 14 November 1945
- Ivan Stefanov, 14 December 1945 – 31 March 1946
- Stancho Cholakov, 31 March 1946 – 10 October 1946
- Tzonyu Tzonchev, 10 October 1946 – 13 August 1949
- Atanas Mechkarov, 13 August 1949 – 19 March 1955
- Vela Lukanova, 5 December 1955 – 5 December 1959
- Kiril Nestorov, 7 December 1959 – 5 January 1969
- Kiril Zarev, 5 January 1969 – 7 July 1974
- Veselin Nikiforov, 8 July 1974 – 3 January 1984
- Vasil Kolarov, 3 January 1984 – 20 December 1989
- Ivan Dragnevski, 20 December 1989 – 9 January 1991
- Todor Valchev, 9 January 1991 – 24 January 1996
- Lyubomir Filipov, 24 January 1996 – 11 June 1997
- Svetoslav Gavriiski, 11 June 1997 – 9 October 2003
- Ivan Iskrov, 9 October 2003 – 14 July 2015
- Dimitar Radev, 14 July 2015 –

== See also ==
- Economy of Bulgaria
- Commemorative coins of Bulgaria
- Financial Supervision Commission (Bulgaria)
- Bulgarian Deposit Insurance Fund
- List of banks in Bulgaria
- List of central banks
- List of financial supervisory authorities by country
