= Ran Bosilek =

Bulgarian writer and translator

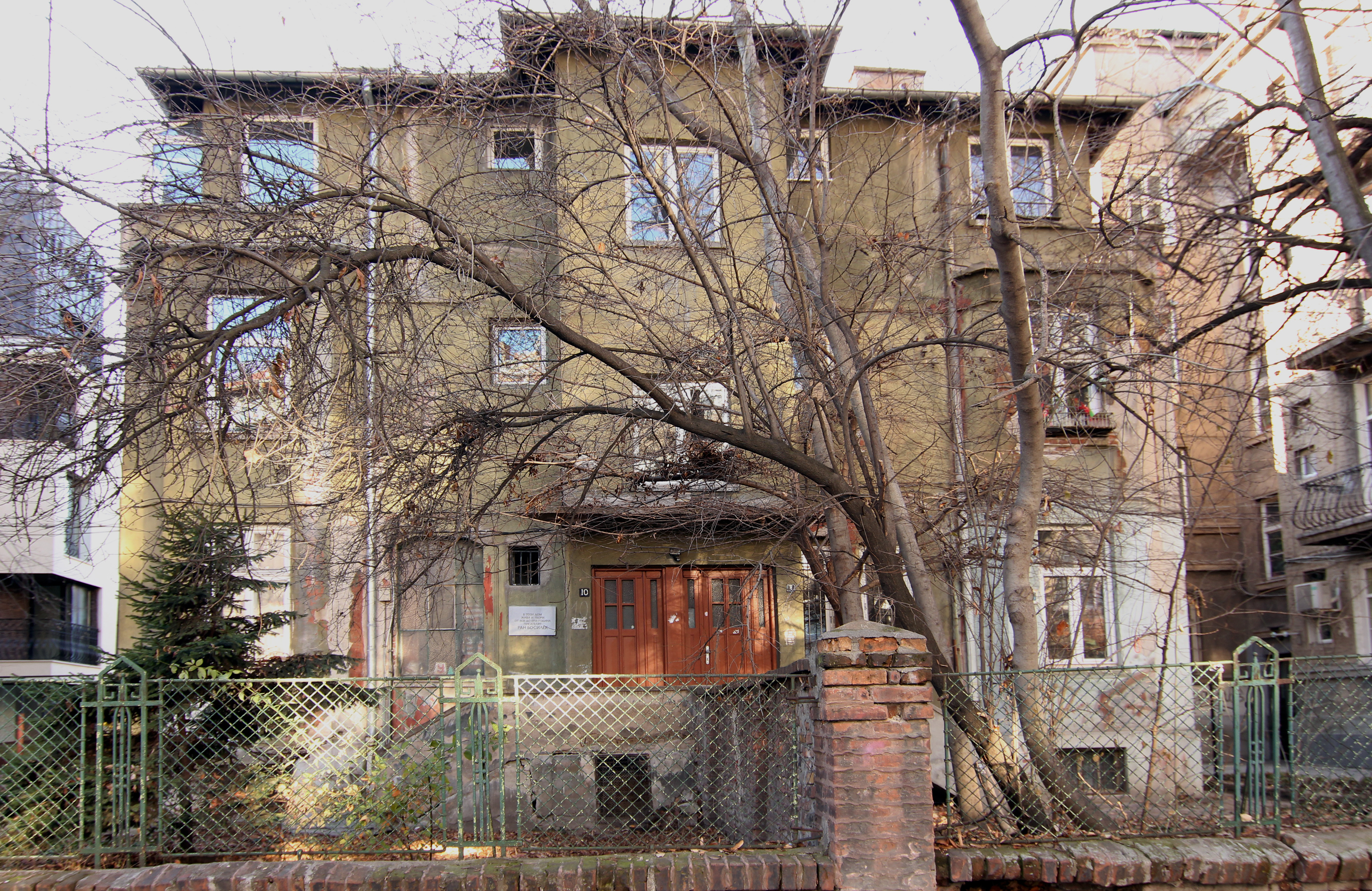
The house in Sofia, 10 Ivan Asen II str., where Ran Bosilek lived and worked from 1923 to 1958

Ran Bosilek (Bulgarian: Ран Босилек) (26 September 1886 in Gabrovo – 8 October 1958 in Sofia), born Gencho Stanchev Negentsov (Bulgarian: Генчо Станчев Негенцов), was a Bulgarian author of children's books. Three years before his death, in 1955, he translated Astrid Lindgren's children's book "Karlsson-on-the-Roof" into Bulgarian.
