= Ran Online =

2004 video game

RAN Online
- Developers: Min Communications, Inc.
- Publisher: GameSamba (North America)
- Platform: Microsoft Windows
- Release: April 20, 2004
- Genre: MMORPG

Ran Online (stylized as RAN Online, Chinese: 亂Online) was a massively multiplayer online role-playing game developed by Min Communications, Inc., the company that had also developed Remnant Knights.

After starting the first official service in Korea in July 2004, RAN Online continued to expand globally. Servers were opened in Taiwan and Hong Kong in May 2005, Japan in September 2005, Malaysia in October 2005, Thailand in November 2005, the Philippines in January 2006, Europe in September 2013, and North America in November 2013. Because it was free-to-play and had low system requirements, RAN Online remained popular in the Philippines in 2011, and was listed among the most popular MMO games in the Philippines in a 2009 study. On August 12, 2019, its official Facebook page announced the game's closure. Meanwhile, in 2018, Wavegame published RAN with the name "New RAN Online" in the Southeast Asia region. However, it shut down on June 30, 2021. In 2023, a few private server developers reopened the game, but it is still unstable to play due to a lack of old data. In the same year, Min Communications CEO Kim Byung-min issued a serious warning against illegal private servers and noted that the company has no plans to sell service rights or release a mobile version in the future.

== Schools ==
You could choose schools for your characters. There were three main schools in the game: Sacred Gate, Mystic Peak and Phoenix.

== Classes ==
The game's classes originally consisted of male Brawler (alternatively called Fighter), male Swordsman (alt. Knight), female Archer, and female Shaman (alt. QiGong). The Rebirth update turns classes no longer gender specific and introduced the Extreme class, which can be only unlocked on accounts with an existing character in specific level. Later updates added Gunner (alt. Scientist), Assassin, Magician and Shaper classes.

== PvP ==
=== School Wars (Tyranny) ===
At most fifty members of each school can participate in School Wars (formerly called Tyranny) set every three hours. The goal of the game is to capture three towers positioned in different locations in the modified Saint Power Plant map within 30 minutes. A school automatically wins if it captures all the towers or if it captures two towers after the game's duration; otherwise, no winner is declared.

=== Capture the Flag ===
Two teams of five players are selected to compete against each other during the registration of the game. The players can be composed of different classes from different schools.

== Item Shop and Payment ==
Players can buy many different costumes such as wedding dresses or movie themed outfits, different kinds of pets (Siberian Husky, Turtle, White Tiger, Ranny Bear) and the recently added pets (Monkey, Panther, Pixie, Saurus), their pet skills (Automatic potion, Auto Looting, Auto recovery, Attack and Defense increase, Item non-drop), nail arts, hairstyles, accessories, destiny boxes, bikes that can increase the movement speed of the player, game points and other items through the Ran Item Shop.

Players can also change different stats of their armors and weapons using different reform cards (Reform Card, Basic Stat Reform Card, Additional Stat Reform Card). Moreover, seal cards (Seal Card, Dual Seal Card, Triple Seal Card) can also be used to retain certain stat points while reforming.
