= Prosecutor's Office of the Republic of Bulgaria =

Prosecutor General of Bulgaria (Прокуратура на Република България)
Agency overview
- Formed: 7 February 1992
- Jurisdiction: Constitution of Bulgaria
- Headquarters: 1061 Sofia, 2 Vitosha Blvd.
- Agency executive: Vanya Stefanova, Prosecutor General
- Website: www.prb.bg/bg/

Prosecutor General of Bulgaria Главен прокурор на Република България
- Incumbent; Vanya Stefanova (acting) since 22 April 2026
- Appointer: President of Bulgaria; on the advice of the Supreme Judicial Council
- Term length: Seven years
- Constituting instrument: Article 129 of the Constitution
- Inaugural holder: Aleksandar Malinov (originally); Ivan Tatarchev (modern-day constitution)
- Formation: 25 May 1880 (originally); 7 February 1992 (post-communism)
- Website: www.prb.bg/bg/

The Prosecutor General of the Republic of Bulgaria (Bulgarian: Главен прокурор на Република България) heads the system of courts known as the Office of the Prosecutor of the Republic of Bulgaria (Bulgarian: Прокуратура на Република България). The Prosecutor General can be appointed for a term of seven years and removed by the President of Bulgaria on recommendation from the Supreme Judicial Council (SJC). The President's appointment is only formal, and the decision to appoint or dismiss the General Prosecutor is made by the council. Upon appointment, the General Prosecutor becomes an ex officio member of the SJC. Candidates can only hold the position for one term.

== List of Prosecutors General ==
The following is a list of Prosecutor Generals of Bulgaria since the Bulgarian People's Republic up until the present.

== List of Prosecutors General ==
Per the 1947 Constitution:

General Prosecutor	From	Until
Dimitar Zapryanov (1)	18 December 1947	10 February 1953
Dimitar Zapryanov (2)	10 February 1953	10 April 1954
Jordan Chobanov	9 April 1954	14 March 1959
Mincho Minchev	14 March 1959	8 November 1962
Ivan Vachkov (1)	25 December 1962	14 December 1967
Ivan Vachkov (2)	14 December 1967	8 July 1971
Ivan Vachkov (3)	8 July 1971	16 June 1976
Ivan Vachkov (4)	16 June 1976	12 June 1981
Kostadin Lyutov	17 June 1981	3 May 1987
Vasil Mrachkov	18 August 1987	14 December 1989
Evtim Stoimenov	14 December 1989	6 November 1990
Martin Gunev	1 November 1990	19 February 1992

Per the 1991 Constitution:

No.	General Prosecutor	From	Until	Deputies				
No.	General Prosecutor	From	Until	1	2	3	4	5
1	Ivan Tatarchev	17 February 1992	21 February 1999					
2	Nikola Filchev	16 February 1999	22 February 2006					
3	Boris Velchev	23 February 2006	2 November 2012 (Note: Resigned to join the Constitutional Court of Bulgaria.)					
—	Boiko Naydenov (acting)	6 November 2012	9 January 2013					
4	Sotir Tsatsarov	9 January 2013	16 December 2019 (Note: Resigned to become the leader of the Commission for Combating Corruption and Forfeiture of Illegally Acquired Assets.)					
5	Ivan Geshev	18 December 2019	15 June 2023 (Note: Removed by the Supreme Judicial Council.)	Borislav Sarafov (2019-2023)	Krasimira Filipova (2020-2023)	Desislava Pironeva (2020-2023)	Plamena Apostolova (2020-2023)	Daniela Masheva (2020-2023)
—	Borislav Sarafov (acting)	16 June 2023	22 April 2026 (Note: Resigned following a decision by the Constitutional Court that his mandate can't exceed 6 months as per a 2025 law.)	Elena Karakasheva (2023-2025)	Maria Pavlova (2023-2024)			
—	Borislav Sarafov (acting)	16 June 2023	22 April 2026	Magdalena Lazarova (2025-present)	Vanya Stefanova (2024-2026)			
—	Vanya Stefanova (acting)	22 April 2026	Incumbent	Magdalena Lazarova (2025-present)				
