= Nenovsky =

Nenovsky is a surname. Notable people with the surname include:

- Neno Kolev Nenovsky (1934–2004), Judge of the Constitutional Court of Bulgaria
- Nikolay Nenovsky (born 1963), Bulgarian economist
