= Pavlina Panova =

Bulgarian judge (born 1967)

- Павлина Панова

President of the Constitutional Court of Bulgaria
- Incumbent
- Assumed office 16 November 2021
- Preceded by: Boris Velchev

Personal details
- Born: 12 February 1967 (age 59) Gramada, Bulgaria
- Education: University of Sofia

Pavlina Panova (Bulgarian: Павлина Панова; born 12 February 1967) is a Bulgarian prosecutor and judge. She has been member of the Constitutional Court of Bulgaria since 2008 and in 2021 became the first female president of the Court. She previously served at the Supreme Court of Cassation and the European Court of Human Rights.

== Early life ==
Panova was born on 12 February 1967 in the village of Gramada, Bulgaria. She got a degree in 1992 and later PhD in laws from the University of Sofia.

== Career ==
She began her career as a public prosecutor in Sofia and subsequently had a long career as a judge at various levels of the Bulgarian judicial system: the Sofia Regional Court, the Sofia City Court and the Court of Appeal.

In 2007, she was appointed a judge of the Supreme Court of Cassation, where she went on to hold positions of high responsibility, including the vice-presidency of the court and the presidency of its criminal chamber.

Throughout her career, Panova has also combined her judicial practice with university teaching and the training of legal professionals, as well as undertaking specialisation courses in European law in several European countries. She has also served as an ad hoc judge at the European Court of Human Rights.

Panova was appointed judge of the Constitutional Court of Bulgaria in 2018 by theGeneral Assembly of Judges in the Supreme Court of Cassation and the Supreme Administrative Court. On 16 November 2021 she became the first woman to preside the Court after the reitrment of Boris Velchev. She was re-appointed on 15 November 2024.
