= Gramada, Bulgaria =

Gramada Грамада
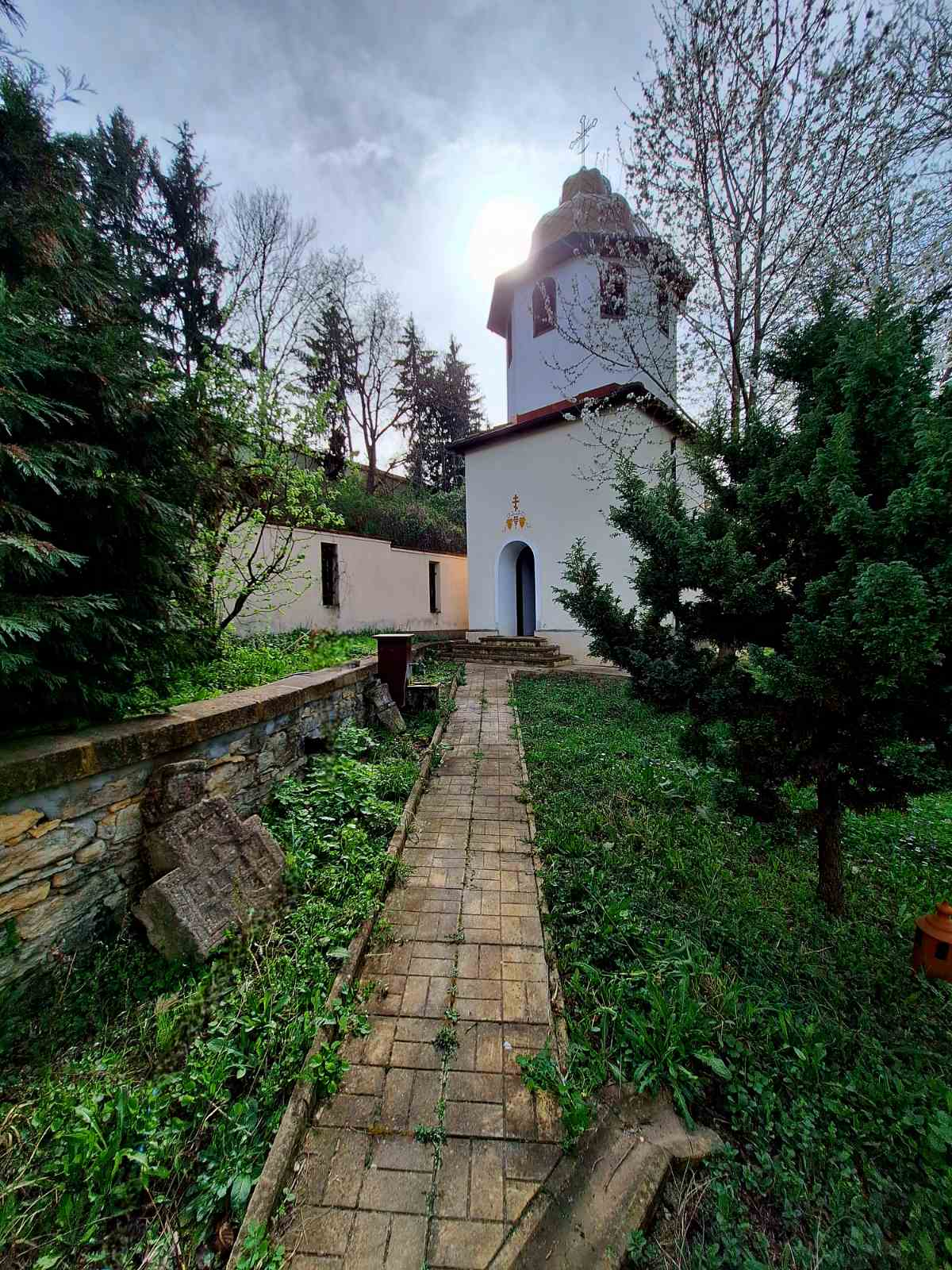
- Bell tower of the "Holy Trinity" Church

- Location of Gramada
- Coordinates: 43°50′N 22°40′E
- Country: Bulgaria
- Provinces (Oblast): Vidin

Government
  - Mayor: Nikolay Gergov
- Elevation: 230 m (750 ft)

Population (December 2009)
  - Total: 1,647
- Time zone: UTC+2 (EET)
  - Summer (DST): UTC+3 (EEST)
- Postal Code: 3830
- Area code: 09337

Gramada (Bulgarian: Грамада, pronounced [ɡrɐˈmadɐ]; "heap, pile") is a town in northwestern Bulgaria, part of Vidin Province. It is the administrative centre of the homonymous Gramada Municipality, which lies in the central part of Vidin Province. It is located in the western Danubian Plain, 30 kilometres (19 mi) from the provincial capital Vidin and 200 kilometres (120 mi) from Sofia. As of December 2009, the town had a population of 1,647.

== Municipality ==
Gramada municipality covers an area of 184 square kilometres (71 sq mi) and includes the following eight places:

- Boyanovo
- Brankovtsi
- Gramada
- Medeshevtsi
- Milchina Laka
- Sratsimirovo
- Toshevtsi
- Vodna

Gramada municipality is situated in a plain and is crossed by the rivers Vidbol, Kormanitsa, Gramada River and Yasova Bara. The municipality is mainly agricultural, cultivating grain, vines, fruits and vegetables.

== Points of interest ==
East of Gramada there is a powerful medium-wave broadcasting station built in 1973 called Vidin transmitter. Its signals can be easily received in the whole of Europe. It works on 576 kHz and on 1224 kHz with a power of 500 kW. For transmission on 576 kHz a 259-metre-tall (850 ft) guyed mast equipped with a cage antenna at its lower part is used. For the transmission on 1224 kHz four guyed masts, insulated against ground, each equipped with a cage antenna, are used, which allows a switchable directional pattern.

== Honour ==
Gramada Glacier on Smith Island, South Shetland Islands is named after Gramada.

== Notable people ==
- Pavlina Panova, judge
