= Dimitar Radev =

Bulgarian economist

- Димитър Радев
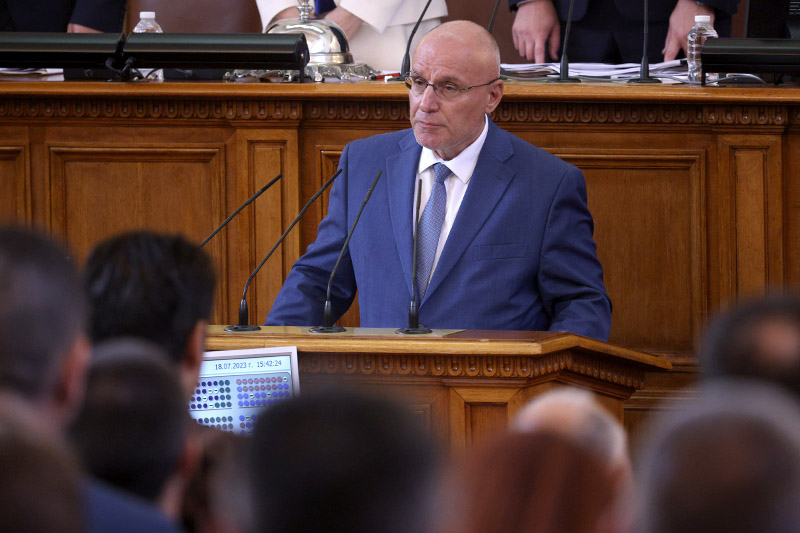

Governor of the Bulgarian National Bank
- Incumbent
- Assumed office 14 July 2015
- Preceded by: Ivan Iskrov

Personal details
- Born: 12 July 1956 (age 70) Plovdiv, Bulgaria
- Education: University of National and World Economy; Georgetown University

Dimitar Radev is a Bulgarian economist who since July 14, 2015 has been governor of the Bulgarian National Bank, and member of the Governing council of the European Central Bank since 2026.

== Early life and education ==
Radev was born in Plovdiv and on 12 July 1956. He graduated in Finance and Credit at the University of National and World Economy, and later specialized in Georgetown University's Institute of Foreign Relations, Washington (1994).

== Career ==
In the 1990s, Radev served as a deputy finance minister in charge of budget.

Before his appointment, Radev worked at the International Monetary Fund’s fiscal affairs department.

In a parliamentary selection process including public nominations and hearings, Radev was named one of the candidates to succeed Bulgaria’s central bank governor Ivan Iskrov in 2015, alongside Biser Manolov, Grigorii Vazov and Victor Yotzov. He was nominated by Bulgaria’s ruling GERB party. He was also backed by GERB’s junior partner, the Reformist Bloc. In July 2015, he was appointed for a six-year term.

In 2026 Bulgaria adopted the Euro, and since then Radev has been a member of the Governing Council of the ECB.

== Other activities ==
- European Systemic Risk Board (ESRB), Ex-Officio Member of the General Board
- International Monetary Fund (IMF), Ex-Officio Member of the Board of Governors
- European Central Bank. Governing Council member (2026-)
