= Adoption of the euro in Bulgaria =

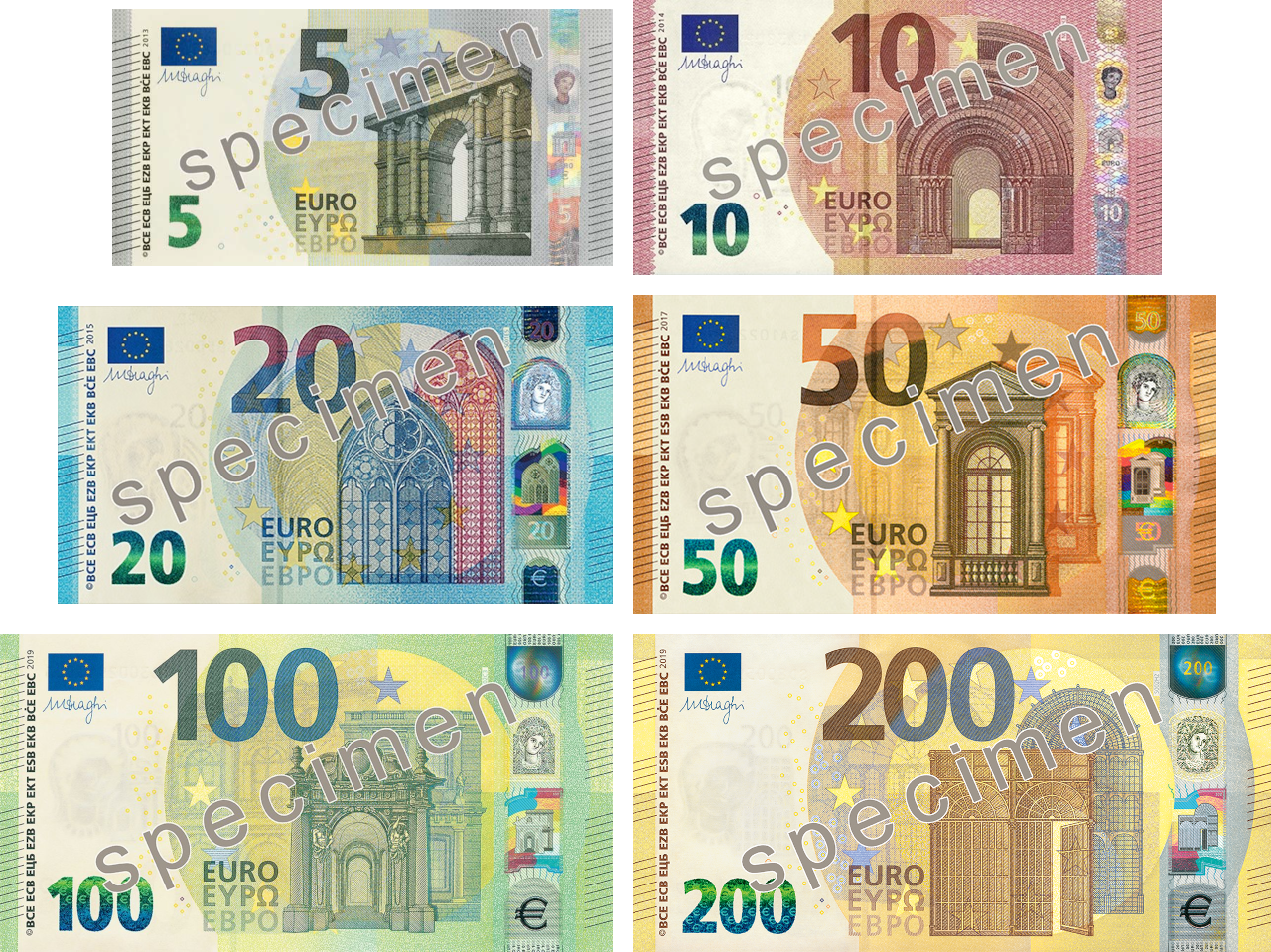
- Euro banknotes - all denominations
- Date: 1 January 2026 (introduction) – 31 January 2026 (complete transition)
- Location: Bulgaria
- Type: Economic transition
- Theme: Adoption of the euro as the national currency
- Participants: Government of Bulgaria, European Union
- Outcome: Replacement of the Bulgarian lev with the euro

Eurozone participation European Union member states (special territories not shown) 21 in the eurozone 1 in ERM II, with an opt-out (Denmark) 5 not in ERM II, but committed to join the eurozone after meeting the convergence criteria (Czech Republic, Hungary, Poland, Romania, and Sweden) Non–EU member states 4 using the euro with a monetary agreement (Andorra, Monaco, San Marino, and Vatican City) 2 using the euro unilaterally (Kosovo and Montenegro)

Bulgaria adopted the euro on 1 January 2026, becoming the 21st member state of the eurozone. When Bulgaria joined the European Union in 2007 it committed to join the eurozone and replace its currency, the lev, with the euro. In February 2025, the country officially requested off-cycle assessments of their convergence by the European Commission and ECB to determine the country's readiness. The 2025 convergence reports published on 4 June 2025 concluded that Bulgaria met the convergence criteria. On 8 July 2025, the European Parliament endorsed Bulgaria's entry in the eurozone and the Council of the European Union adopted the final three legislative acts required for the admission.

The lev was first established by the Bulgarian National Bank in 1880. Under a currency board introduced in 1997, the lev was first pegged to the Deutsche Mark (1,000 BGL = 1 DEM). With the lev's 1999 redenomination and the arrival of the euro, the exchange rate was updated to its long-standing fixed peg of 1.95583 BGN = 1 EUR. Between 10 July 2020 and 31 December 2025, the lev remained within the European Exchange Rate Mechanism (ERM II), exiting the mechanism to transition into the euro on 1 January 2026. On that day, the euro became the official currency of Bulgaria; however, during the cash changeover period (January 2026), the lev and the euro circulated in parallel for cash payments. Since 1 February 2026, the euro has been the sole legal currency in Bulgaria, ending 146 years of Bulgarian lev usage.

== History ==
When it joined the EU in 2007, Bulgaria committed to switching its currency, the lev, to the euro, as stated in the 2005 EU accession treaty. The transition would occur once the country meets all the euro convergence criteria. As the lev was fixed to the Deutsche Mark at par, the lev's peg effectively switched to the euro on 1 January 1999, at the rate of 1.95583 leva = 1 euro, which was the Deutsche Mark's fixed exchange rate to the euro.

Before the Bulgarian euro coins had been designed, the Madara Rider had already been selected as the motif on the obverse ("national" side) of the coins. Two Bulgarian saints, Ivan Rilski and Paisius of Hilendar, are depicted on the Bulgarian euro coins. In this way, Bulgaria is the first Orthodox country to have a Christian character on its euro coins. Bulgaria officially joined the European Exchange Rate Mechanism (ERM II) on 10 July 2020. Bulgarian government and central bank officials adopted a draft national plan for euro adoption on 30 June 2021, after stating that same day Bulgaria's intention to adopt the euro on 1 January 2024. In May 2022, the government adopted a more definitive version of its euro introduction plan, reaffirming the country's commitment to adopt the euro on the target date. On 21 February 2023, Bulgaria scrapped the idea of adopting the single currency on 1 January 2024 due to an internal political crisis.

The Maastricht Treaty, which Bulgaria acceded to by way of its EU accession treaty, requires that all European Union member states, except Denmark, join the euro once certain economic criteria are met. In November 2007, Finance Minister Plamen Oresharski stated that his goal was to comply with all five convergence criteria by 2009 and adopt the euro in 2012. Bulgaria did not comply with the requirement to be an ERM II member for at least two years, nor did it satisfy the price stability criterion in 2008. Bulgaria's inflation in the 12 months from April 2007 to March 2008 reached 9.4%, well above the reference value limit of 3.2%.

Bulgaria fulfilled the state budget criterion of only having a maximum deficit of 3% of the country's gross domestic product (GDP). The country had posted surpluses since 2003, which in 2007 represented 3.4% of its GDP (at the time, the EC forecast that it would remain at 3.2% of GDP in both 2008 and 2009). Bulgaria also complied with the public debt criteria. During the prior decade, the Bulgarian debt had declined from 50% of GDP to 18% in 2007, and was expected to reach 11% in 2009. Finally, the average for the long-term interest rate during the prior year was 4.7% in March 2008, well within the reference limit of 6.5%. A 2008 analysis said that Bulgaria would not be able to join the eurozone earlier than 2015 due to high inflation and the repercussions of the 2008 financial crisis. Some members of the government, notably economy minister Petar Dimitrov, speculated about unilaterally introducing the euro, which was not well received by the European Commission. Bulgaria met all five criteria in the last off-cycle convergence report published by the European Central Bank in June 2025.

=== Joining ERM II ===
The Bulgarian lev had been pegged to the euro since the latter was launched in 1999, at a fixed rate of €1 = BGN 1.95583, through a strictly managed currency board. Prior to that, the lev was pegged at par to the German mark. While the currency board which pegs Bulgaria to the euro had been seen as beneficial to the country fulfilling criteria so quickly, the ECB pressured Bulgaria to drop it as it did not know how to let a country using a currency board join the euro. The Bulgarian Prime Minister stated the desire to keep the currency board until the euro was adopted. However, factors such as high inflation, an unrealistic exchange rate with the euro and the country's low productivity were negatively affected by the system.

Simeon Dyankov, Bulgaria's finance minister, said in September 2009 that Bulgaria planned to enter ERM II that November, but this was delayed. It was then delayed further due to an increased budget deficit, outside the Maastricht criteria. From 2011 to 2020, Bulgaria's non-membership of the ERM II was the primary factor that prevented euro membership, as Bulgaria met the other criteria for euro adoption. In July 2011, Bulgaria's Minister of Finance Simeon Dyankov stated that the government would not adopt the euro as long as the European sovereign-debt crisis was ongoing.

In January 2015, Finance Minister Vladislav Goranov (under Prime Minister Boyko Borisov) changed approach and said that it was possible for Bulgaria to join ERM II before the end of 2018. Goranov said he would immediately begin talks with the Eurogroup to establish a plan for joining ERM II. In July 2015, the Bulgarian government established a coordination council to prepare the country for eurozone membership. The coordination council was to draft a plan for the introduction of the euro, propose a target date and organise the preparation and coordination of the expert working groups. This approach was supported by former Bulgarian National Bank governor Kolyo Paramov, who had been in office when the state currency board was established. Paramov argued that adoption would "trigger a number of positive economic effects":

- Sufficient money supply (leading to increased lending, which is needed to improve economic growth)
- Getting rid of the currency board that prevents the national bank from functioning as a lender of last resort to rescue banks in financial trouble
- Private and public lending benefiting from lower interest rates (at least half as high)

Former Bulgarian National Bank deputy governor Emil Harsev agreed with Paramov, stating that it was possible to adopt the euro in 2018 and that "Bulgaria's membership in the eurozone will bring only positive effect on the economy" because "since [the establishment of] the currency board in 1997, we have been accepting all the negative effects of accession into the eurozone without getting the positive ones (access to the European financial market)".

=== From 2017 ===
When Borisov's government was re-elected in 2017, he declared his intention to apply to join ERM II, but Goranov elaborated that the government would only seek to join once the eurozone states were ready to approve the application, and that he expected to have clarity on the matter by the end of 2017. On taking the presidency of the EU Council in January 2018, Borisov indicated that no clarification had been given, but announced that he was going to pursue applications for both ERM II and Schengen by July 2018 regardless. Bulgaria sent a letter to the Eurogroup in July 2018 expressing its desire to join ERM II and committing to enter into a "close cooperation" agreement with the European banking union. In January 2019, Goranov said he hoped that Bulgaria could join the ERM II mechanism in July and introduce the euro on 1 January 2022. However, the first deadline was deferred to July 2019 due to extra conditions requested by eurozone governments, namely that Bulgaria:

- Join the European banking union at the same time as ERM II (meaning Bulgaria's banks must first pass stress tests)
- Reinforce supervision of the non-bank financial sector and fully implement EU anti money-laundering rules
- Thoroughly implement the reforms of the Mechanism for Cooperation and Verification (CVM)

While the CVM reforms were mentioned, and progress in judicial reform and organised crime was expected, leaving the CVM was not a precondition. As of October 2019, Goranov's target was to enter the ERM II by April 2020. In January 2020, IMF Managing Director Kristalina Georgieva said that it was possible for Bulgaria to join ERM II later in 2020 and adopt the euro in 2023. Borisov stated in February 2020 that Bulgaria's application would be reviewed in July. In March, the Bulgarian central bank said that this target was no longer realistic due to the ongoing COVID-19 pandemic. However, in April Borisov stated that he would push forward the application by the end of April. The reason he gave for this U-turn was the 500 billion euros rescue package to deal with the economic fallout of the coronavirus pandemic, which the finance ministers of the Eurogroup had agreed upon on 10 April. On 24 April, Fitch Ratings announced that they would probably upgrade Bulgaria's foreign currency issuer default ratings (IDR) between Bulgaria's accession to ERM II and euro adoption:

Given that the COVID-19 pandemic response is taking up significant resources with regard to political engagement at the EU-wide level, facilitating the Bulgarian lev's ERM2 accession may decline as a relative priority for European institutions. If concerns about risks ease and the process resumes, this would be supportive of the rating, as underlined by our view that all things being equal, we would upgrade Bulgaria's Long-Term Foreign-Currency IDR by two notches between admission to the ERM II and joining the euro.

On 30 April 2020, Bulgaria officially submitted documents to the European Central Bank to apply to join ERM II, the first step to introducing the euro. On 12 May, European Commission Executive Vice President Valdis Dombrovskis stated that Bulgaria could join ERM II together with Croatia in July, which both countries did on 10 July. By the ECB decision adopted on 24 June 2020, Bulgaria and its national bank became a member of the European banking union under a close cooperation agreement which entered into force on 1 October 2020.

=== Joining the eurozone ===
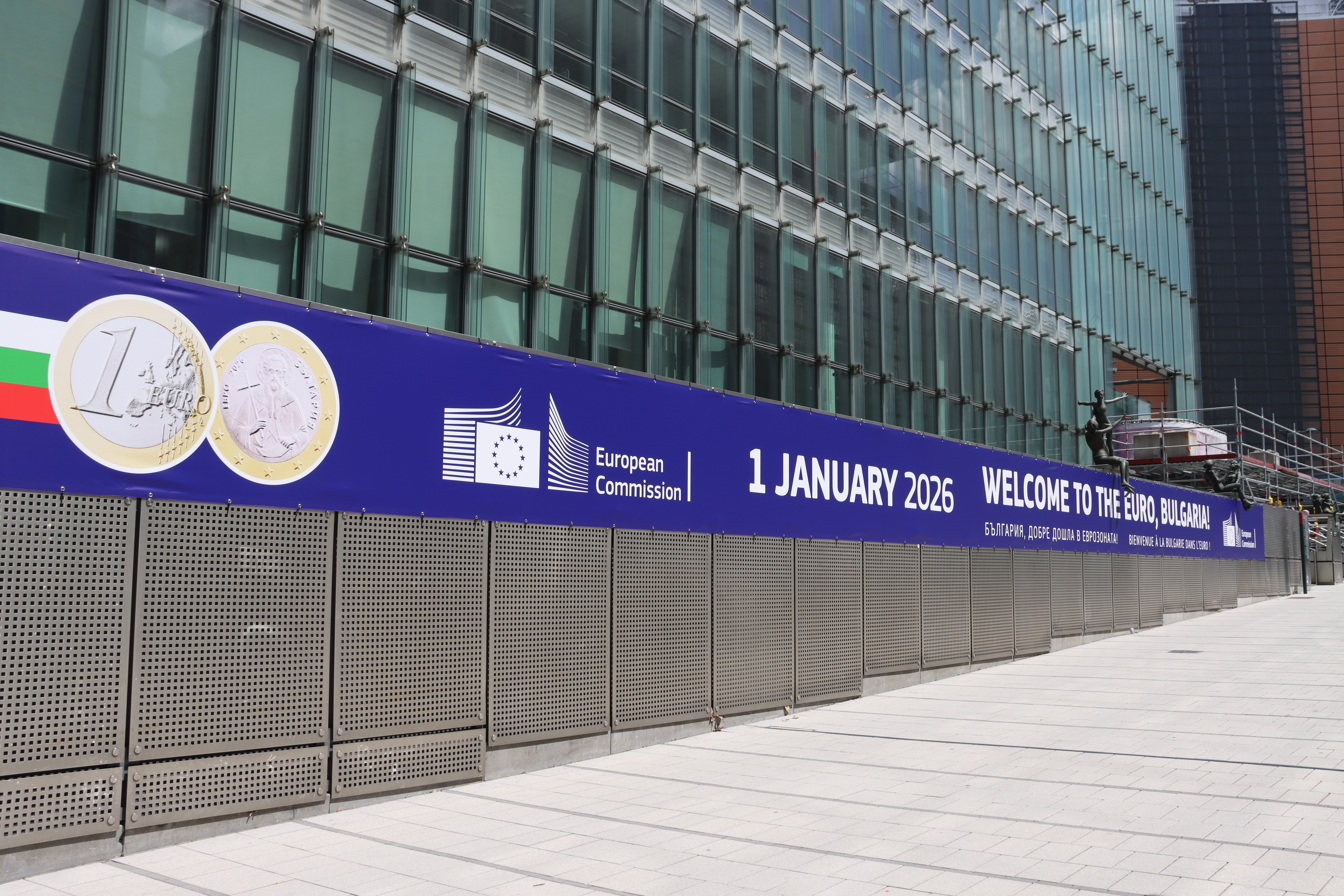
"Welcome to the euro, Bulgaria!" sign at the EU Commission on 8 July 2025, Brussels

Bulgaria adopted the euro as its official currency on 1 January 2026, following several delays. In February 2023, Finance Minister Rositsa Velkova announced that Bulgaria's target date for entry into the eurozone would be delayed from 1 January 2024 to 1 January 2025, primarily due to the projected inflation not meeting the inflation criterion in time. In April 2023, enough signatures had been collected to put the entry to a referendum. However, in June 2023 the referendum was rejected by Bulgaria's parliament with 98 votes against, 46 abstentions and 68 votes in favour. On 26 July 2023, the newly formed Bulgarian government adopted a programme which stated that the switch to the euro in January 2025 is one of the main government priorities. In November 2023, the Bulgarian euro coin design was revealed and approved by the Bulgarian National Bank.

In order to ensure full compliance with the legal criteria for euro adoption, the Bulgarian Parliament approved the necessary legislation on the Bulgarian National Bank (BNB) on 1 February 2024. However, according to the assessment of the President of BNB, Dimitar Radev, the then recently adopted constitutional revision (making it possible for the Governor or Deputy Governor of the BNB to be appointed as a temporary caretaker Prime Minister in case of failed attempts to form regular governments), and the then recently adopted revision to the law on the BNB (making it possible for such a caretaker Prime Minister to resume his work and role at BNB after having completed his tenure as temporary caretaker Prime Minister), were both unlikely to meet ECB's convergence criteria for legal compliance. The ECB was not consulted on this specific change to Bulgarian law, but was expected to reveal its assessment on this potential issue in its convergence report scheduled for publication in June 2024. In the event, the report assessed Bulgarian legislation as compatible with the Treaties and the Statute of the ESCB, and euro adoption from 2025 was ruled out on economic grounds instead, Bulgaria having failed to meet the price stability criterion.

On 20 January 2024, Prime Minister Nikolai Denkov said in an interview that Bulgaria might be forced to delay its adoption of the euro to 1 July 2025 if the inflation criterion is not met in time, although the target date of 1 January 2025 remained unchanged. Finance Minister Assen Vassilev believed Bulgaria was on track for euro adoption at some point in time in 2025, as the last inflation criteria was projected to be met between June and September 2024, and the revised Bulgarian euro adoption law was expected to be approved by the ECB shortly.

The euro adoption law was launched as a draft law for public consultation from 25 March to 24 April, and subsequently will be subject to approval by the Bulgarian Parliament; the European Commission—although not yet ECB—had already approved the published version as of 26 March. The ECB proposed several amendments to the proposed euro adoption law on 2 May 2024. The Bulgarian Ministry of Finance later clarified that the proposed euro adoption law will never be assessed by ECB as part of their euro adoption compliance test of the national legislation in their convergence reports (due to this law only being a national matter), but stressed that it was important from a national perspective that the National Assembly vote and approve the law by the end of summer 2024. An information website (www.evroto.bg) was launched on 25 March, dedicated to communicate the progress towards introduction of the euro in Bulgaria and practicalities of the euro changeover, and the European Commission signed a Partnership Agreement for co-financing information campaigns towards Bulgarian citizens and businesses on all euro changeover aspects on 12 April.

After a planned government rotation and negotiations for a renewed government mandate for the next nine months failed, and subsequent attempts to form a new government among the elected parties were likewise unsuccessful, Bulgarian President Rumen Radev announced he would appoint a new caretaker Prime Minister and caretaker government tasked with organising an early election in June 2024. Analysts had warned that snap elections could risk delaying efforts for Bulgaria to adopt the euro in 2025. However, outgoing Finance Minister Assen Vassilev stated that preparations were so far advanced that at the current stage a caretaker government could ensure eurozone entry in 2025. Incoming caretaker Prime Minister Dimitar Glavchev stated that the incoming caretaker government would continue to focus on achieving membership of the eurozone and "Schengen on land" among its priorities.

On 26 June 2024, the ECB released their report confirming that the country had failed to comply with the inflation criteria and was therefore unable to join the eurozone on 1 January 2025 target date. According to BNB's press website evroto.bg, it was projected that the inflation criteria would be met by the end of 2024, and that if it was, the country would request an off-cycle compliance re-assessment to get approval to adopt the euro as soon as possible. In June 2024, Bulgaria's acting finance minister said Bulgaria would need to reduce inflation in order to meet ECB requirements to adopt the euro in January 2026.

As of July 2024, the process was in an advanced phase. Once the required level of convergence had been achieved, an off-cycle evaluation would be requested. On 26 July 2024, the members of the Bulgarian National Assembly adopted a decision obliging the Bulgarian government to speed up the process of introducing the common European currency. On 7 August, the law on the introduction of the euro was adopted, which represented the most important legislative act necessary for the smooth running of the currency changeover process. Out of 167 present members, 106 MPs voted in support of the law, in particular MPs from the pro-European majority in the form of PP-DB, GERB and DPS, while 48 MPs from Revival (Vazrazhdane), independents and two Socialists voted against. 77 MPs were absent and 11 MPs from There is Such a People abstained. This law determines the terms and ways in which the currency will be changed. It was the final important legal act on the way to Bulgaria's euro adoption before fulfilling the last Maastricht criteria—that of price stability and, accordingly, the subsequent decision of the Council of the EU to introduce the euro in Bulgaria. After the council made another decision on the issue, some regulations and other subnormative acts were to be adopted to regulate in greater detail what was written in the package of laws that Bulgaria adopted on the path to the eurozone. On 20 August 2024, President Rumen Radev signed a decree promulgating in the Bulgarian State Gazette the law on the euro, with which it officially entered into force.

==== Final preparations and adoption ====
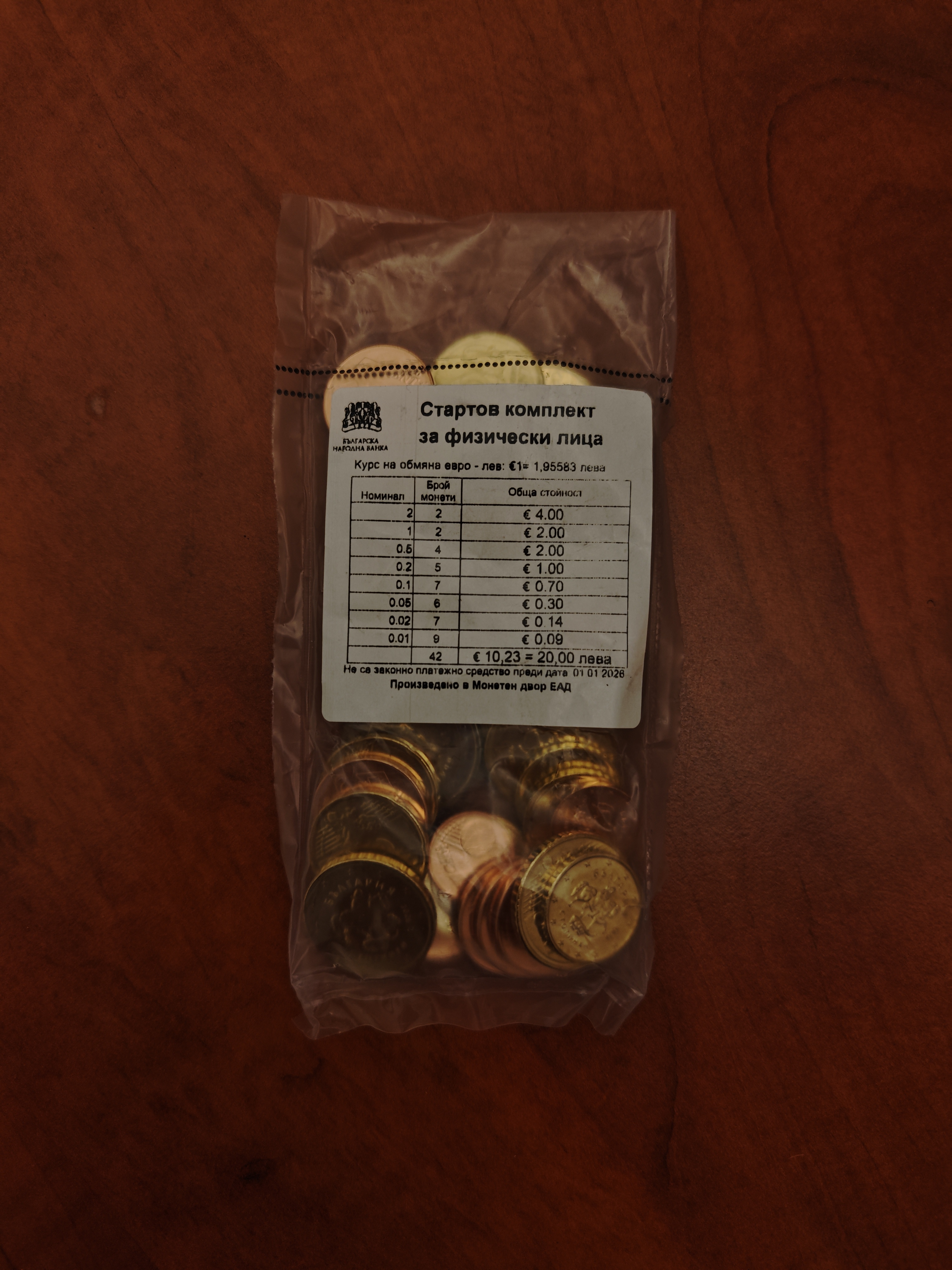
Bulgarian small euro starter kit

According to Eurostat data released in mid-January 2025, Bulgaria's inflation rate was 2.6%, only 0.1 percentage points above the threshold for meeting the inflation criterion. On 17 January 2025, it was reported that the government was expected to request off-cycle convergence reports from the European Commission and the ECB within two weeks. On 23 January 2025, Finance Minister Temenuzhka Petkova announced that the country would not submit such a request until the inflation criterion had been met, with Bulgaria still 0.1 percentage points above the threshold.

On 22 February 2025, thousands of supporters of the far-right Revival party attempted to break into the headquarters of the European Union mission in Sofia during a protest against the country's planned adoption of the euro in 2026. On 24 February 2025, after the government determined that Bulgaria had met the inflation criterion, the Council of Ministers adopted a decision to formally request off-cycle convergence reports from the European Commission and the European Central Bank. The following day, Finance Minister Temenuzhka Petkova and Bulgarian National Bank Governor Dimitar Radev formally submitted the request to the European Commission and the ECB.

On 9 May 2025, then Bulgarian President Rumen Radev announced that he would submit a proposal to parliament to hold a referendum on the adoption of the euro. The proposal was subsequently rejected by the speaker of parliament. The Bulgarian Constitutional Court had previously ruled that such a referendum was inadmissible because it would conflict with Bulgaria's commitments under national and EU law.

On 4 June 2025, the European Commission and the European Central Bank published their off-cycle convergence reports, concluding that Bulgaria fulfilled the convergence criteria for adopting the euro. The European Commission subsequently proposed the Council measures necessary for Bulgaria to adopt the euro on 1 January 2026.

On 19 June 2025, the finance ministers of the Eurogroup member states unanimously recommended that Bulgaria be approved to adopt the euro. On 20 June 2025, the Economic and Financial Affairs Council unanimously supported Bulgaria's accession to the eurozone. On 24 June 2025, the Committee on Economic and Monetary Affairs and the Subcommittee on Tax Matters of the European Parliament approved a draft report recommending Bulgaria's adoption of the euro on 1 January 2026. The vote was 46 in favour, 3 against and 5 abstentions.

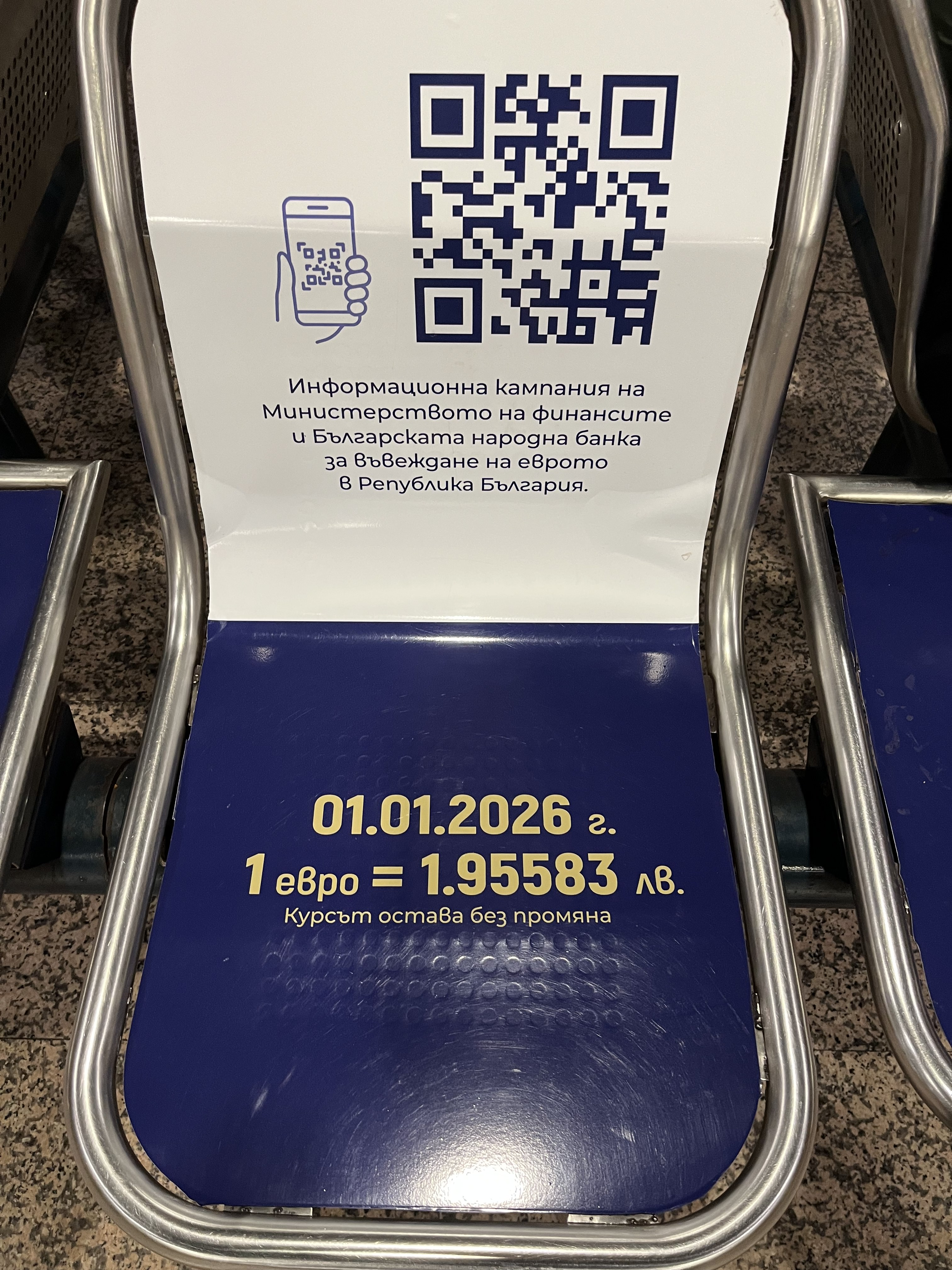
Seat in the Sofia metro depicting the conversion rate from lev to euro, as part of an awareness campaign by the Bulgarian National Bank and Ministry of Finance.

During a meeting of the European Council on 26 June 2025, EU leaders welcomed Bulgaria's fulfilment of all the convergence criteria set out in the Treaty, endorsed the Commission's proposal for the country to adopt the euro on 1 January 2026, and invited the Council to swiftly adopt the relevant proposals. On 8 July 2025, the European Parliament endorsed Bulgaria's accession to the eurozone from 1 January 2026. Members of the European Parliament adopted, by 531 votes in favour, 69 against and 79 abstentions, a report confirming that Bulgaria met the criteria for adopting the euro. Later that day, the Council gave its final approval by unanimously adopting the three remaining legal acts, including one fixing the conversion rate at 1.95583 Bulgarian lev per euro. Their adoption completed the legal process for Bulgaria to become the 21st member of the euro area. The acts were signed by Stephanie Lose on behalf of the Danish Presidency of the Council of the EU, in the presence of Temenuzhka Petkova, Valdis Dombrovskis, Paschal Donohoe and Luis de Guindos.

From 8 August 2025 to 8 August 2026, sales prices were required to be displayed in both lev and euro using the same font and colour. Books, school textbooks and school supplies were exempt until 1 January 2026, when dual pricing also became mandatory for them. Due to technical restrictions, taxi displays and fuel pumps continued to show prices only in lev before 1 January 2026 and only in euro thereafter, although gas stations were required to display prices in both currencies prominently on their premises. Purchase receipts also showed the amount paid in both lev and euro.

On 11 December 2025, the Board of Governors of the European Stability Mechanism approved Bulgaria's application for membership and the technical terms for the country's accession to the ESM. Following Bulgaria's adoption of the euro on 1 January 2026, the country formally became the 21st member of the ESM on 29 June 2026, when the ESM Treaty entered into force for Bulgaria.

== Convergence status ==
Convergence criteria
Assessment date	Country	HICP inflation rate (Note: The rate of change of the 12-month average HICP over the prior 12-month average must be no more than 1.5% larger than the unweighted arithmetic average of the similar HICP inflation rates in the 3 EU member states with the lowest HICP inflation. If any of these 3 states have a HICP rate significantly below the similarly averaged HICP rate for the eurozone (which according to ECB practice means more than 2% below), and if this low HICP rate has been primarily caused by exceptional circumstances (i.e. severe wage cuts or a strong recession), then such a state is not included in the calculation of the reference value and is replaced by the EU state with the fourth lowest HICP rate.)	Excessive deficit procedure		Exchange rate		Long-term interest rate (Note: The arithmetic average of the annual yield of 10-year government bonds as of the end of the past 12 months must be no more than 2.0% larger than the unweighted arithmetic average of the bond yields in the 3 EU member states with the lowest HICP inflation. If any of these states have bond yields which are significantly larger than the similarly averaged yield for the eurozone (which according to previous ECB reports means more than 2% above) and at the same time does not have complete funding access to financial markets (which is the case for as long as a government receives bailout funds), then such a state is not to be included in the calculation of the reference value.)	Compatibility of legislation
Assessment date	Country	HICP inflation rate	Budget deficit to GDP	Debt-to-GDP ratio	ERM II member	Change in rate (Note: The change in the annual average exchange rate against the euro.)	Long-term interest rate	Compatibility of legislation
2012 ECB Report (Note: Reference values from the ECB convergence report of May 2012.)	Reference values	Max. 3.1% (Note: Sweden, Ireland and Slovenia were the reference states.) (as of 31 Mar 2012)	None open (as of 31 Mar 2012)		Min. 2 years (as of 31 Mar 2012)	Max. ±15% (Note: The maximum allowed change in rate is ± 2.25% for Denmark.) (for 2011)	Max. 5.80% (Note: Sweden and Slovenia were the reference states, with Ireland excluded as an outlier.) (as of 31 Mar 2012)	Compliant (as of 31 Mar 2012)
2012 ECB Report	Reference values	Max. 3.1% (as of 31 Mar 2012)	Max. 3.0% (FY 2011)	Max. 60% (FY 2011)	Min. 2 years (as of 31 Mar 2012)	Max. ±15% (for 2011)	Max. 5.80% (as of 31 Mar 2012)	Compliant (as of 31 Mar 2012)
2012 ECB Report	Bulgaria	2.7%	Open (Closed in June 2012)		No	0.0%	5.30%	No
2012 ECB Report	Bulgaria	2.7%	2.1%	16.3%	No	0.0%	5.30%	No
2013 ECB Report (Note: Reference values from the ECB convergence report of June 2013.)	Reference values	Max. 2.7% (Note: Sweden, Latvia and Ireland were the reference states.) (as of 30 Apr 2013)	None open (as of 30 Apr 2013)		Min. 2 years (as of 30 Apr 2013)	Max. ±15% (for 2012)	Max. 5.5% (as of 30 Apr 2013)	Compliant (as of 30 Apr 2013)
2013 ECB Report	Reference values	Max. 2.7% (as of 30 Apr 2013)	Max. 3.0% (FY 2012)	Max. 60% (FY 2012)	Min. 2 years (as of 30 Apr 2013)	Max. ±15% (for 2012)	Max. 5.5% (as of 30 Apr 2013)	Compliant (as of 30 Apr 2013)
2013 ECB Report	Bulgaria	2.4%	None		No	0.0%	3.89%	Not assessed
2013 ECB Report	Bulgaria	2.4%	0.8%	18.5%	No	0.0%	3.89%	Not assessed
2014 ECB Report (Note: Reference values from the ECB convergence report of June 2014.)	Reference values	Max. 1.7% (Note: Latvia, Portugal and Ireland were the reference states, with Greece, Bulgaria and Cyprus excluded as outliers.) (as of 30 Apr 2014)	None open (as of 30 Apr 2014)		Min. 2 years (as of 30 Apr 2014)	Max. ±15% (for 2013)	Max. 6.2% (Note: Latvia, Ireland and Portugal were the reference states.) (as of 30 Apr 2014)	Compliant (as of 30 Apr 2014)
2014 ECB Report	Reference values	Max. 1.7% (as of 30 Apr 2014)	Max. 3.0% (FY 2013)	Max. 60% (FY 2013)	Min. 2 years (as of 30 Apr 2014)	Max. ±15% (for 2013)	Max. 6.2% (as of 30 Apr 2014)	Compliant (as of 30 Apr 2014)
2014 ECB Report	Bulgaria	-0.8%	None		No	0.0%	3.52%	No
2014 ECB Report	Bulgaria	-0.8%	1.5%	18.9%	No	0.0%	3.52%	No
2016 ECB Report (Note: Reference values from the ECB convergence report of June 2016.)	Reference values	Max. 0.7% (Note: Bulgaria, Slovenia and Spain were the reference states, with Cyprus and Romania excluded as outliers.) (as of 30 Apr 2016)	None open (as of 18 May 2016)		Min. 2 years (as of 18 May 2016)	Max. ±15% (for 2015)	Max. 4.0% (Note: Slovenia, Spain and Bulgaria were the reference states.) (as of 30 Apr 2016)	Compliant (as of 18 May 2016)
2016 ECB Report	Reference values	Max. 0.7% (as of 30 Apr 2016)	Max. 3.0% (FY 2015)	Max. 60% (FY 2015)	Min. 2 years (as of 18 May 2016)	Max. ±15% (for 2015)	Max. 4.0% (as of 30 Apr 2016)	Compliant (as of 18 May 2016)
2016 ECB Report	Bulgaria	-1.0%	None		No	0.0%	2.5%	No
2016 ECB Report	Bulgaria	-1.0%	2.1%	26.7%	No	0.0%	2.5%	No
2018 ECB Report (Note: Reference values from the ECB convergence report of May 2018.)	Reference values	Max. 1.9% (Note: Cyprus, Ireland and Finland were the reference states.) (as of 31 Mar 2018)	None open (as of 3 May 2018)		Min. 2 years (as of 3 May 2018)	Max. ±15% (for 2017)	Max. 3.2% (Note: Cyprus, Ireland and Finland were the reference states.) (as of 31 Mar 2018)	Compliant (as of 20 March 2018)
2018 ECB Report	Reference values	Max. 1.9% (as of 31 Mar 2018)	Max. 3.0% (FY 2017)	Max. 60% (FY 2017)	Min. 2 years (as of 3 May 2018)	Max. ±15% (for 2017)	Max. 3.2% (as of 31 Mar 2018)	Compliant (as of 20 March 2018)
2018 ECB Report	Bulgaria	1.4%	None		No	0.0%	1.4%	No
2018 ECB Report	Bulgaria	1.4%	-0.9% (surplus)	25.4%	No	0.0%	1.4%	No
2020 ECB Report (Note: Reference values from the ECB convergence report of June 2020.)	Reference values	Max. 1.8% (Note: Portugal, Cyprus, and Italy were the reference states.) (as of 31 Mar 2020)	None open (as of 7 May 2020)		Min. 2 years (as of 7 May 2020)	Max. ±15% (for 2019)	Max. 2.9% (Note: Portugal, Cyprus, and Italy were the reference states.) (as of 31 Mar 2020)	Compliant (as of 24 March 2020)
2020 ECB Report	Reference values	Max. 1.8% (as of 31 Mar 2020)	Max. 3.0% (FY 2019)	Max. 60% (FY 2019)	Min. 2 years (as of 7 May 2020)	Max. ±15% (for 2019)	Max. 2.9% (as of 31 Mar 2020)	Compliant (as of 24 March 2020)
2020 ECB Report	Bulgaria	2.6%	None		No	0.0%	0.3%	No
2020 ECB Report	Bulgaria	2.6%	-2.1% (surplus)	20.4%	No	0.0%	0.3%	No
2022 ECB Report (Note: Reference values from the Convergence Report of June 2022.)	Reference values	Max. 4.9% (Note: France, Finland, and Greece were the reference states.) (as of April 2022)	None open (as of 25 May 2022)		Min. 2 years (as of 25 May 2022)	Max. ±15% (for 2021)	Max. 2.6% (as of April 2022)	Compliant (as of 25 March 2022)
2022 ECB Report	Reference values	Max. 4.9% (as of April 2022)	Max. 3.0% (FY 2021)	Max. 60% (FY 2021)	Min. 2 years (as of 25 May 2022)	Max. ±15% (for 2021)	Max. 2.6% (as of April 2022)	Compliant (as of 25 March 2022)
2022 ECB Report	Bulgaria	5.9%	None		1 year, 10 months	0.0%	0.5%	No
2022 ECB Report	Bulgaria	5.9%	4.1% (exempt)	25.1%	1 year, 10 months	0.0%	0.5%	No
2024 ECB Report (Note: Reference values from the Convergence Report of June 2024.)	Reference values	Max. 3.3% (Note: Belgium, Denmark, and the Netherlands were the reference states.) (as of May 2024)	None open (as of 19 June 2024)		Min. 2 years (as of 19 June 2024)	Max. ±15% (for 2023)	Max. 4.8% (as of May 2024)	Compliant (as of 27 March 2024)
2024 ECB Report	Reference values	Max. 3.3% (as of May 2024)	Max. 3.0% (FY 2023)	Max. 60% (FY 2023)	Min. 2 years (as of 19 June 2024)	Max. ±15% (for 2023)	Max. 4.8% (as of May 2024)	Compliant (as of 27 March 2024)
2024 ECB Report	Bulgaria	5.1%	None		3 years, 11 months	0.0%	4.0%	Yes
2024 ECB Report	Bulgaria	5.1%	1.9%	23.1%	3 years, 11 months	0.0%	4.0%	Yes
2025 ECB Report (Note: Reference values from the Convergence Report of June 2025.)	Reference values	Max. 2.8% (Note: Finland, Ireland, and Italy were the reference states.) (as of April 2025)	None open (as of 19 May 2025)		Min. 2 years (as of 19 May 2025)	Max. ±15% (for 2024)	Max. 5.1% (as of April 2025)	Compliant (as of 15 April 2025)
2025 ECB Report	Reference values	Max. 2.8% (as of April 2025)	Max. 3.0% (FY 2024)	Max. 60% (FY 2024)	Min. 2 years (as of 19 May 2025)	Max. ±15% (for 2024)	Max. 5.1% (as of April 2025)	Compliant (as of 15 April 2025)
2025 ECB Report	Bulgaria	2.7%	None		4 years, 10 months	0.0%	3.9%	Yes
2025 ECB Report	Bulgaria	2.7%	3.0%	24.1%	4 years, 10 months	0.0%	3.9%	Yes

Criterion fulfilled
Criterion potentially fulfilled: If the budget deficit exceeds the 3% limit, but is "close" to this value (the European Commission has deemed 3.5% to be close by in the past), then the criteria can still potentially be fulfilled if either the deficits in the previous two years are significantly declining towards the 3% limit, or if the excessive deficit is the result of exceptional circumstances which are temporary in nature (i.e. one-off expenditures triggered by a significant economic downturn, or by the implementation of economic reforms that are expected to deliver a significant positive impact on the government's future fiscal budgets). However, even if such "special circumstances" are found to exist, additional criteria must also be met to comply with the fiscal budget criterion. Additionally, if the debt-to-GDP ratio exceeds 60% but is "sufficiently diminishing and approaching the reference value at a satisfactory pace" it can be deemed to be in compliance.
Criterion not fulfilled

== Effects of euro adoption ==
Since the lev had been pegged to the euro at a fixed rate, it was argued before formal adoption that Bulgaria was already a de facto member of the eurozone, as it could not pursue an independent monetary policy and it was bound by the interest rate policy of the European Central Bank, without having a say in monetary strategy. Therefore, Bulgaria would not lose any financial tools by adopting the euro, at least none that it had not already voluntarily surrendered by adopting its currency board. Adopting the euro and thereby becoming a de jure member of the eurozone was therefore argued to enhance Bulgaria's position by giving it a seat at the European Central Bank's decision-making table.

== Linguistic issues ==
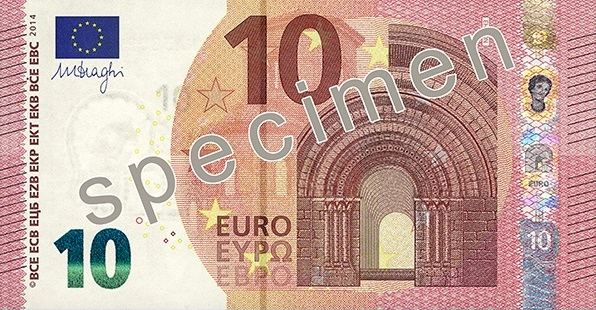
The 10 euro note from the new Europa series is written in the Latin (EURO) and Greek (ΕΥΡΩ) alphabets, but also in the Cyrillic (ЕВРО) alphabet, as a result of Bulgaria joining the European Union in 2007.

Bulgarian Cyrillic script and its non-straightforward transliteration of the word euro initially caused issues when the European Central Bank and European Commission insisted that Bulgaria adopt the name ЕУРО (i.e., euro) rather than the original ЕВРО (i.e., evro) Bulgarian pronunciation: [ˈɛvro] (from Bulgarian Европа [ɛvˈrɔpɐ], meaning Europe), arguing that the currency's name should be standardised across the EU as much as possible. Bulgaria maintained that its language's alphabet and phonetic orthography warranted the exception. At the 2007 EU Summit in Lisbon, the issue was decided in Bulgaria's favour, making евро the official Cyrillic spelling from 13 December 2007.

This ruling affected the design of euro banknotes. The second series of notes (beginning with the €5 note issued from 2013) includes the term "ЕВРО" and the abbreviation "ЕЦБ" (short for Европейска централна банка, the Bulgarian name of the European Central Bank). The first series only had the standard Latin alphabet "EURO" and Greek "ΕΥΡΩ". The Bulgarian National Bank requested that the Institute for Bulgarian Language provide a linguistic guideline for the adoption of the euro. It was prescribed that the eurocent should be written евроцент [ˈɛvrot͡sɛnt], but that the word for cent, стотинка, could also be used. In Bulgarian, the plural of euro is евро (without inflection in plural form), and this was noted as an acceptable variation. The words стотинка and стотинки will continue to be present on Bulgarian coins, or more precisely, they are minted on the national side of Bulgarian euro coins. The 1 euro cent coin reads "стотинка" and the other 2, 5, 10, 20 and 50 euro cent coins read "стотинки".

== Design selection and circulation ==
The Bulgarian euro coins entered circulation on 1 January 2026, marking Bulgaria's official adoption of the currency. The designs were finalized after a public selection process and official approval by the Bulgarian National Bank (BNB) and the European Union.

Debates regarding the design of the "national" (obverse) side of the coins began in earnest in 2008. Major contenders for the national symbol included the Madara Rider, ancient traditional nestinars (Bulgarian fire dancers), the Cyrillic script, the Rila Monastery, and the Tsarevets medieval fortress near Veliko Tarnovo.

A national vote was held between 17 and 29 June 2008, via post offices, fuel stations, and schools. The Madara Rider was announced as the winner, securing a plurality of 25.44% of the vote.

On 24 July 2023, BNB Governor Dimitar Radev announced the Governing Council's decision that the Bulgarian national side of euro coins would mirror the design of the Bulgarian lev coins previously in circulation. This design choice was officially approved by the BNB in November 2023 and by the Council of the European Union in February 2024.

In preparation for the launch, the BNB Governing Council approved revised graphic designs on 9 April 2025, updating the issue year from "2025" to "2026". Following the Council of the EU's final approval for adoption, the Bulgarian Mint commenced minting to ensure supply for the 1 January 2026 rollout.

The coins feature the Bulgarian alphabet (Cyrillic script), which was already present on euro banknotes. They also display the name of the fractional unit of the former currency, the lev (СТОТИНКА/СТОТИНКИ). Alongside Greek euro coins and Cyprus euro coins, Bulgarian euro coins are the only euro coins that do not use the Latin alphabet on their national side.

During a dual-use period through January 2026 both lev and euro were accepted for cash payments.

== Public opinion ==
After euro adoption in Bulgaria

The following is the Spring 2026 Eurobarometer poll on the question of whether Bulgarians consider that having the euro is a good thing for Bulgaria or not.

Date (survey taken)	Date (survey published)	Yes	No	Undecided / Don't know	Reference
February 2026	April 2026	49%	43%	8%	

Before euro adoption in Bulgaria

The following are the annual Eurobarometer polls on the question of whether Bulgarians were more in favour or against the idea of introducing the euro in their country.

Date (survey taken)	Date (survey published)	Yes	No	Undecided / Don't know	Reference
March 2025	June 2025	45%	53%	2%	
May 2024	June 2024	49%	49%	2%	
April 2023	June 2023	49%	50%	1%	
April 2022	June 2022	44%	54%	2%	
May 2021	July 2021	54%	44%	2%	
June 2020	July 2020	48%	50%	2%	
April 2019	June 2019	47%	48%	5%	
April 2018	May 2018	51%	46%	3%	
April 2017	May 2017	50%	45%	5%	
April 2016	May 2016	47%	48%	5%	
April 2015	May 2015	55%	39%	6%	
April 2014	June 2014	51%	45%	4%	
April 2013	June 2013	52%	43%	5%	
April 2012	July 2012	53%	43%	4%	
November 2011	July 2012	56%	40%	4%	
May 2011	August 2011	45%	42%	13%	
September 2010	December 2010	48%	39%	13%	
May 2010	July 2010	51%	37%	12%	
September 2009	November 2009	49%	31%	20%	
May 2009	December 2009	44%	36%	20%	
May 2008	July 2008	51%	31%	18%	
September 2007	November 2007	46%	33%	21%	
March 2007	May 2007	45%	33%	22%	

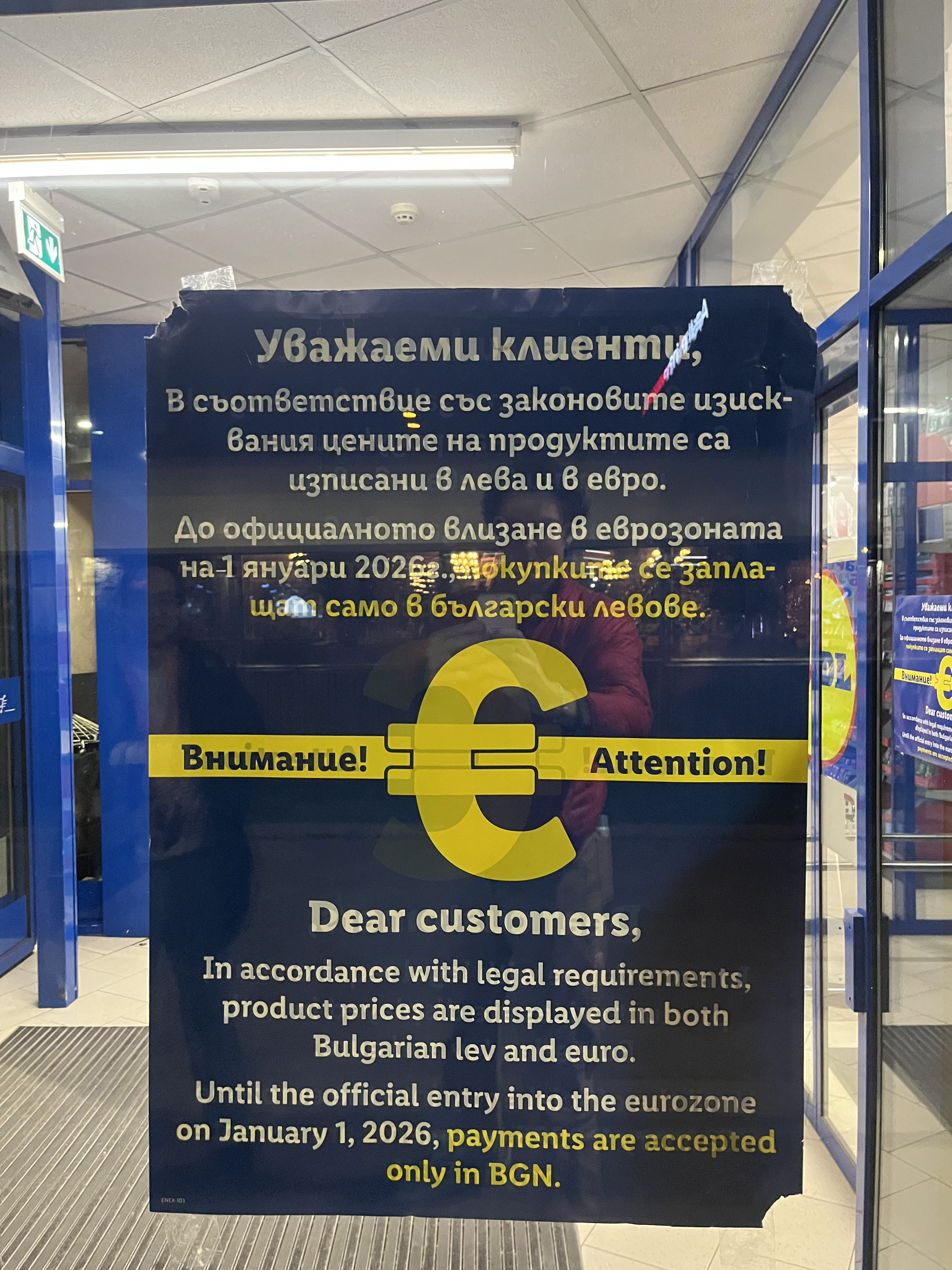
A poster that explains to customers in Bulgarian and English that product prices are listed in both lev and euro and that payments are only accepted in lev until 1 January 2026.

=== Adoption controversy ===
The Zhelyazkov Government and a majority in the National Assembly supported Bulgaria’s adoption of the euro, describing it as part of the country’s continued integration into the European Union. Domestically, however, the issue remained contested, with contemporary polling indicating higher public opposition than support for adoption.

Several initiatives called for a referendum on whether Bulgaria should adopt the euro or retain the lev, including popular initiatives and a proposal by President Rumen Radev on the timing of the proposed adoption. The parliamentary majority rejected these proposals and proceeded through parliamentary decision-making. In the case of the president’s proposal, the Constitutional Court ruled that the initial refusal to submit it to a vote was unconstitutional; the Assembly subsequently voted 135–81 against holding a referendum. Similar proposals in 2023 and 2024 were also rejected. In late 2025, another initiative reported collecting 200,000 in-person signatures against euro adoption.

Protests against euro adoption were held in 2025, including demonstrations near the time of the changeover. Opponents raised concerns about inflation, reduced national discretion over fiscal and monetary policy, national identity, and the rejection of referendum requests. Supporters emphasized Bulgaria’s existing EU commitments and argued that the decision should be made through representative institutions.

The broader political context also shaped debate. The Zhelyazkov government had resigned after the 2025 anti-corruption protests and was operating in an interim capacity at the time of adoption, which some observers said contributed to tensions. In his 2026 New Year’s address, President Radev criticized the decision not to hold a referendum on the timing of the euro adoption.

== See also ==
- 2007 enlargement of the European Union
- Bulgarian euro coins
- Bulgarian lev
- Enlargement of the eurozone
- International status and usage of the euro
- Economic and monetary union
- History of the euro
- European Currency Unit
- European Central Bank
- European Union
- European Economic Community
- History of Bulgaria
