= Tatarchev =

Tatarchev (Bulgarian: Татарчев) is a Bulgarian masculine surname – its feminine counterpart being Tatarcheva (Татарчева) – and may refer to:

- Hristo Tatarchev (1869–1952), Bulgarian revolutionary
- Ivan Tatarchev (1930–2008), Bulgarian jurist and lawyer
