= First English Language School =

Location
- 60 Knyaz Aleksandar Dondukov Blvd. Sofia; Republic of Bulgaria

Information
- Type: Foreign language school
- Established: 1958
- Authority: Ministry of Education and Science
- Principal: Aleksandar Chakmakov
- Website: Official website

First English Language School – Sofia is a state foreign language school, established in 1958 as the first school in Bulgaria to offer intensive English language instruction. It is the direct successor of the English Department at the Exarch Joseph I Foreign Language High School in Lovech, whose origins date back to 1881, when American missionary James Challis founded the first private secondary school in Northern Bulgaria with instruction in English and French.

Until 1993, the school was known as 114th English Language High School "Lilyana Dimitrova", and since then it has borne its present name. The school is located at 60 Knyaz Aleksandar Dondukov Blvd. in Sofia and has established a reputation for high standards in language education, participation in international programs, and a vibrant student life with numerous clubs and cultural initiatives.

Since 20 March 2024, the principal of the school has been Aleksandar Chakmakov, teacher of English.

== History ==
=== Roots and early background ===
The history of the school dates back to 1881, when American missionary James Challis founded in Lovech the first private secondary school in Northern Bulgaria with instruction in English and French. In 1927, the school was transformed into the American College in Lovech, which developed an active student life with clubs, cultural initiatives, and innovative teaching methods for its time.

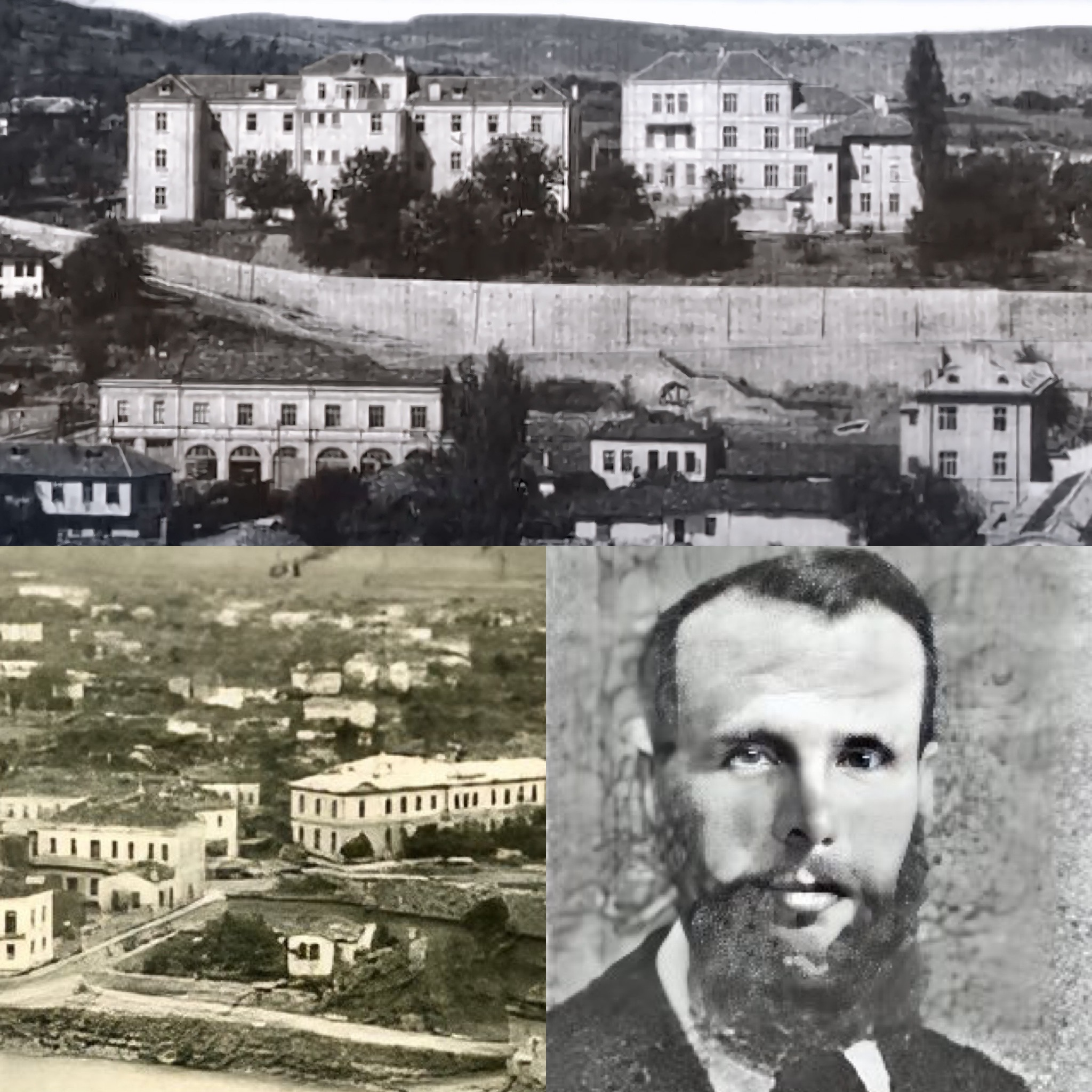
American College – Lovech, historical photograph

With Decree No. 1145 of 2 August 1948 by the Presidium of the Grand National Assembly, published in the State Gazette, all private schools in Bulgaria were closed, including the American College in Lovech. Two years later, the Exarch Joseph I Foreign Language High School was opened in the town, inheriting the traditions of the college and developing three departments – English, French, and German.

=== Establishment of the English Language School in Sofia ===
In 1954, the English Department of the Lovech high school was transferred to Sofia, laying the foundations of a new school with an English profile. In 1958, it was officially established under the name "114th High School with English Language Studies", and shortly thereafter received its patron and became "114th English Language High School 'Lilyana Dimitrova'". Since 1960, the school has been housed at 60 Knyaz Aleksandar Dondukov Blvd., where it remains today.

=== Renaming and a new beginning ===
After the political changes in Bulgaria in 1990, the 114th English Language High School "Lilyana Dimitrova" was renamed First English Language School. The legal change was confirmed by a decision of the Sofia Municipal Council in 1993, marking the beginning of the modern stage of the school's development.

=== Development in the new century ===
Over the years, the school strengthened its authority through the participation of English-speaking lecturers from the UK, USA, and Canada, as well as through active international contacts and cooperation. In 1972, First English became the first Bulgarian school to join the UNESCO Associated Schools Network. In 1988, the spirit of the school was recreated in the film "Vchera", inspired by real events and the atmosphere in the English Department of the Exarch Joseph I Foreign Language High School in Lovech. After the department was moved to Sofia and the present-day school was established, the film gradually came to be regarded as part of the cultural memory of the First English Language School – a symbol of continuity between the Lovech traditions and the development of the Sofia school.

In September 2019, two new school buildings were inaugurated after years of planning and investment, significantly increasing the school's capacity and improving learning conditions.

In March 2021, the school opened its first STEM classrooms.

The first STEM leaders were Dimitar Keremidchiev (IT teacher, project leader and server administrator), Eng. Mariana Donevska (senior IT teacher, main coordinator), Assoc. Prof. Dr. Eng. Petya Petrova (senior teacher of Chemistry and Environmental Protection, chief methodologist, associate professor at the Institute of Catalysis, BAS), Eng. Georgi Georgiev (senior teacher of Informatics and IT, chief technical organizer), and Eng. Martin Petkov (teacher of English and IT, assistant technical organizer).

The technical management and full implementation of the first STEM center – from equipment and system setup to its commissioning – were carried out by Eng. Georgi Georgiev, Head of the ICT Department at the school.

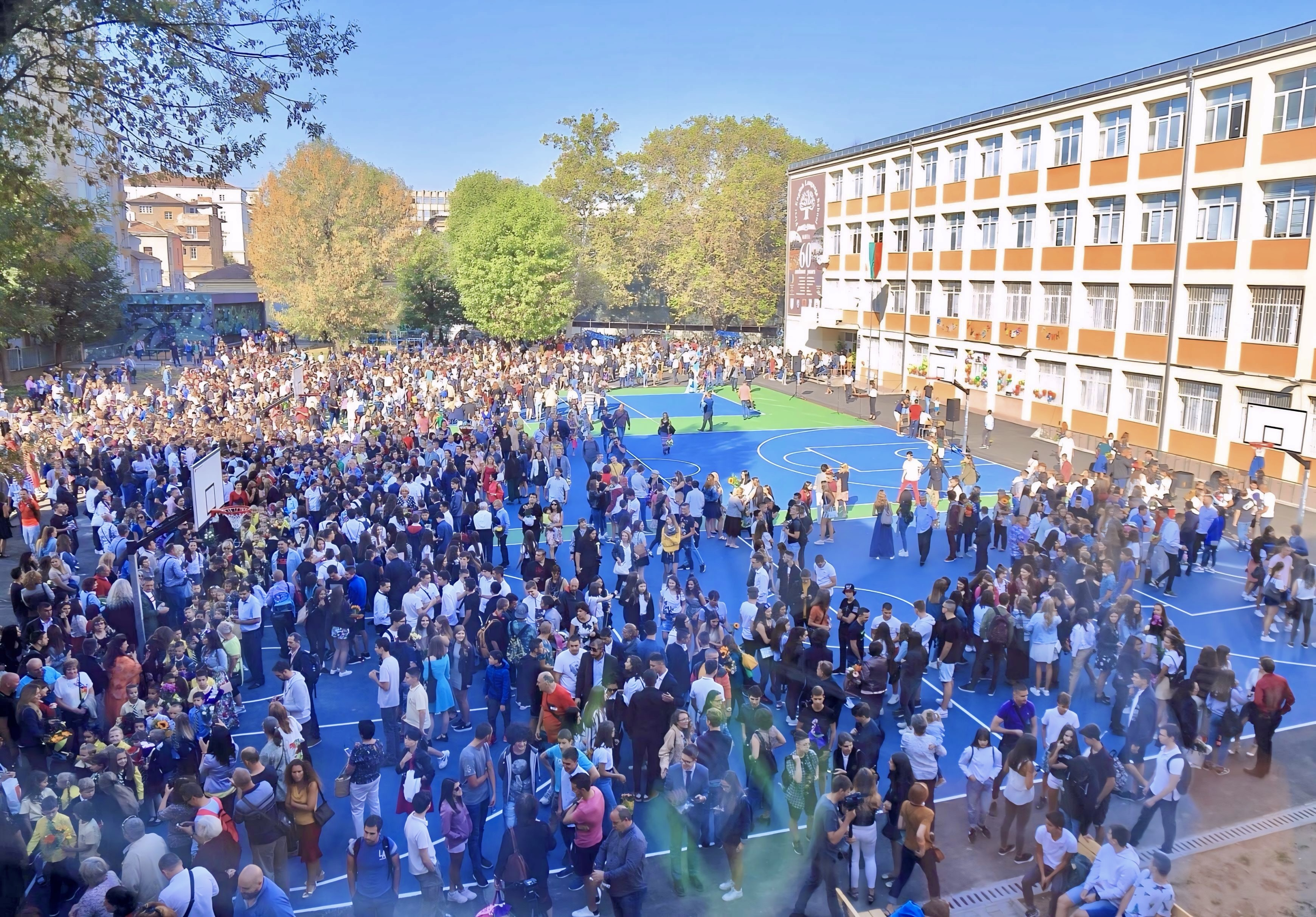
Opening of new educational spaces

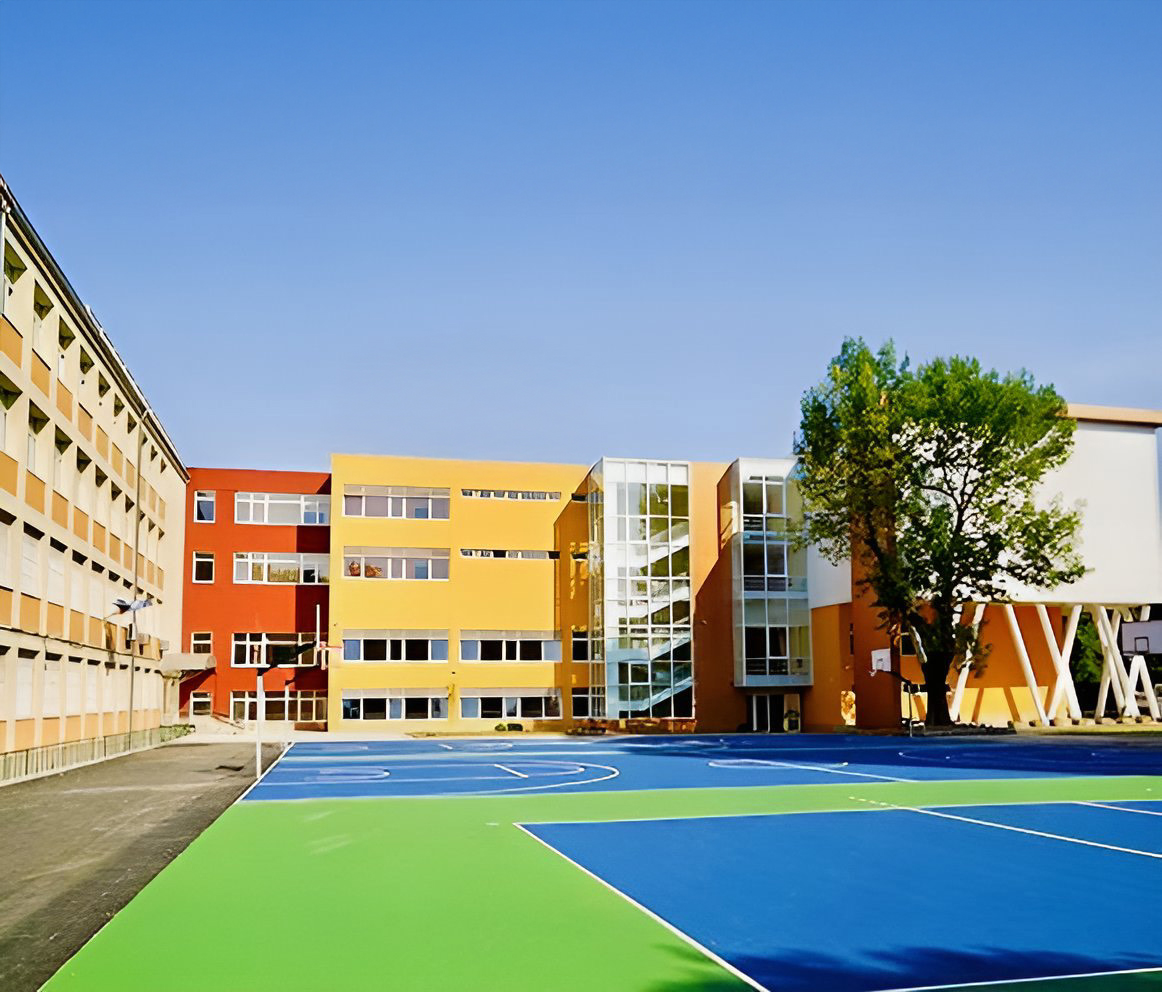
The new sports ground

== Student clubs ==
As of the 2025/2026 school year, the following student clubs are active at the First English Language School:

- Brass Band – learning to play brass instruments, musical literacy, note reading, teamwork, discipline, and responsibility through rehearsals and performances.
- Vocal Group – choral and solo singing, stage presence, and musical expression.
- Rock Band – combining instrumental and vocal performance with creativity and a modern style.
- Karaoke Club – performing favorite songs; developing vocal and stage skills.
- Majorettes – artistic choreography, precision, discipline, and stage performance.
- Ballroom Dance – classical and Latin dance styles.
- Folk Dance Ensemble – preserving Bulgarian traditions through folklore dances and stage performances.
- Debate Club – logical thinking, argumentation, and public speaking through competitions.
- Green Tomato – the school's journalism club; writing, editing, and media culture.
- Interact Club – part of the Rotary movement; volunteering, leadership, and charity initiatives.
- UN Club – simulation of United Nations sessions; diplomacy and international relations.
- MEP Model – understanding the processes of the European Parliament and European integration.
- European Integration Club – discussions and projects related to European values and policies.
- Patriotism and National Studies – patriotic education, historical memory, and national traditions.
- Coding Club – programming, project development, and digital creativity.
- Culinary Club – cooking techniques, teamwork, and catering activities.
- Japanese Culture Club – exploring Japanese traditions, arts, and basic language.
- Psychology of Communication – social skills, emotional intelligence, and effective communication.
- Digital Media Studio FELS (DMS FELS) – mega club uniting video production, photography, drone filming, sound, podcast creation, digital post-production, and PR activities. Students learn communication skills as hosts of productions, develop technical skills with cameras, sound, lighting, and editing software, and gain creativity and hands-on experience in producing modern media projects.
- Creative Writing – developing literary style, imagination, and expression.
- Spanish Theater – performances in Spanish; language practice and stage acting.
- Red Cross Club – humanitarian work, first aid, and social responsibility.

== Notable alumni ==
- Miryana Basheva – Bulgarian poet and lyricist;
- Georgi Bliznashki – caretaker Prime Minister of Bulgaria (2014);
- Irina Bokova – Bulgarian politician, Director-General of UNESCO;
- Philip Dimitrov Dimitrov – Bulgarian politician and former prime-minister of Bulgaria (1991–1992);
- Ognyan Doynov – Bulgarian diplomat and cabinet member from the communist period;
- Lubomir Kuychukov – a deputy foreign minister of Bulgaria;
- Bashar Rahal – actor, producer;
- Galina Toneva – Bulgaria's Deputy Chief Prosecutor;
- Ralitsa Vassileva – anchor for CNN World News;
- Boris Velchev – lawyer, member of the Constitutional court of Bulgaria, and former chief prosecutor (attorney-general) in the history of Bulgaria.
