= Desislava Atanasova =

Bulgarian politician (born 1978)

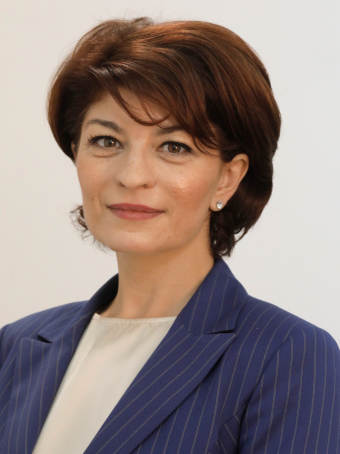

Judge in the Constitutional Court
- Incumbent
- Assumed office 26 January 2024
- Appointed by: National Assembly

Member of the National Assembly
- In office 21 May 2013 – 24 January 2024
- Constituency: Ruse (2013–2014); Montana (2014–2017); Razgrad (2017–2021); Ruse (2021–2024)
- In office 14 July 2009 – 21 March 2012
- Succeeded by: Petar Daskalov
- Constituency: Ruse

Minister of Health
- In office 21 March 2012 – 13 March 2013
- Prime Minister: Boyko Borisov
- Preceded by: Stefan Konstantinov
- Succeeded by: Nikolay Petrov

Personal details
- Born: 8 October 1978 (age 48) Dulovo
- Party: GERB

Desislava Valcheva Atanasova (Bulgarian: Десислава Вълчева Атанасова; born 8 October 1978) is a Bulgarian lawyer and politician serving as a judge of the Constitutional Court since 2024. She was a member of the National Assembly from 2009 to 2012 and from 2013 to 2024. From 2012 to 2013, she served as Minister of Health. On 31 January 2025 Atanasova was chosen to represent Bulgaria in the Venice Commission.

== Early life and education ==
Desislava Atanasova was born on 8 October 1978 in Dulovo, Bulgaria. She graduated with a master's degree in law from the University of National and World Economy in 2001. She later obtained additional master's degrees in political science and diplomacy (2009) and in European integration (2011) from Veliko Tarnovo University. She speaks English and Russian.

Atanasova began her professional career as a judicial candidate at the District Court in Ruse in 2002. She later worked as in-house legal counsel for medical institutions in Ruse between 2005 and 2009. During this period, she was admitted to the Ruse Bar Association and practiced as a lawyer.

== Political career ==
Atanasova became active in politics as a member of the Citizens for European Development of Bulgaria (GERB) party. She was first elected to the National Assembly in 2009, representing Ruse. From 14 July 2010, she chaired the parliamentary Committee on Health.

On 16 March 2012, Prime Minister Boyko Borisov nominated her as Minister of Health, and she assumed office on 21 March 2012. She served as health minister until 13 March 2013.

After leaving the executive branch, Atanasova continued to serve in successive legislatures of the National Assembly. She was a member of the Legal Affairs Committee and the Foreign Policy Committee in the 44th National Assembly. She also chaired a temporary parliamentary commission tasked with drafting amendments to the Constitution in 2020. In later legislatures, she led the parliamentary group of GERB–SDS.

== Constitutional Court ==
On 19 January 2024, the National Assembly elected Atanasova as a judge of the Constitutional Court from the parliamentary quota, together with Borislav Belazelkov. She received the support of 159 members of parliament. The two judges were sworn in on 26 January 2024 in a ceremony attended by senior judicial officials. The President of Bulgaria challenged the constitutionality of the parliamentary election of the new judges before the Constitutional Court.

In February 2025, the Council of Ministers selected Atanasova to represent Bulgaria in the Venice Commission, the advisory body of the Council of Europe on constitutional matters. Borislav Belazelkov was appointed as her deputy.
