= Teodor Tchipev =

Bulgarian judge and politician

Teodor Tchipev (Bulgarian: Теодор Чипев) (born 18 March 1940 in Sofia) is a Bulgarian lawyer and a former judge at the General Court of the European Union.

== Career ==
=== Academia ===
Tchipev graduated with degree in law at St Kliment Ohridski University in 1961. He obtained a doctorate in law in 1977, and was a research fellow at the Institute of Law at the Bulgarian Academy of Sciences from 1973 to 1988. From 1988 to 1991, Tchipev was an associate professor of civil procedure at the Faculty of Law of St Kliment Ohridski University, and from 1995 to 1996, he served as an associate professor of civil procedure at the New Bulgarian University. He was also an associate professor at Paissi Hilendarski University from 2001 to 2006.

=== Law ===
Tchipev worked as a lawyer from 1963 to 1964, and then as a legal adviser for the State Automobile Enterprise for International Transport from 1964 to 1973.

He served as an arbitrator at the Court of Arbitration of the Chamber of Trade and Industry from 1988 to 2006, and as a judge at the Constitutional Court from 1991 to 1994.

From 1994 to 1995, Tchipev was the Minister of Justice of Bulgaria.

Tchipev served as a judge at the General Court of the European Union from 12 January 2007 to 29 June 2010.
