= Gramada Municipality =

Gramada Municipality Община Грамада
- Municipality
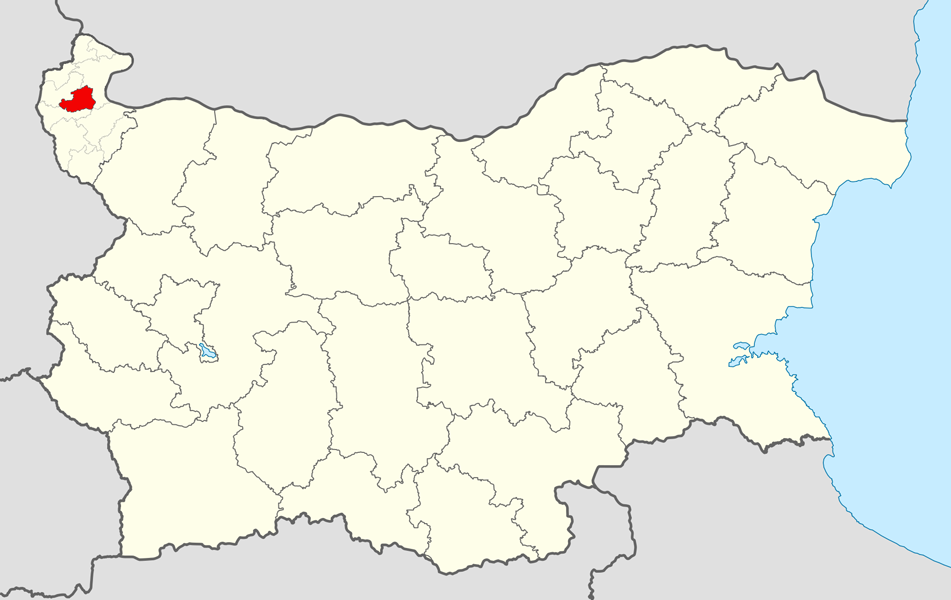
- Gramada Municipality within Bulgaria and Vidin Province.
- Coordinates: 43°50′N 22°40′E
- Country: Bulgaria
- Province (Oblast): Vidin
- Admin. centre (Obshtinski tsentar): Gramada

Area
  - Total: 184 km^{2} (71 sq mi)

Population (December 2021)
  - Total: 1,587
  - Density: 8.63/km^{2} (22.3/sq mi)
- Time zone: UTC+2 (EET)
  - Summer (DST): UTC+3 (EEST)

Gramada Municipality (Bulgarian: Община Грамада) is a small municipality (obshtina) in Vidin Province, Northwestern Bulgaria, located in the Danubian Plain about 8 km southwest of Danube river. It is named after its administrative centre - the town of Gramada.

The municipality embraces a territory of 184 km^{2} (71 sq mi) with a population of 2,384 inhabitants, as of December 2009.

The easternmost border of the area is linked by the main road E79 which connects the province centre of Vidin with the city of Montana and respectively with the western operating part of Hemus motorway.

== Settlements ==
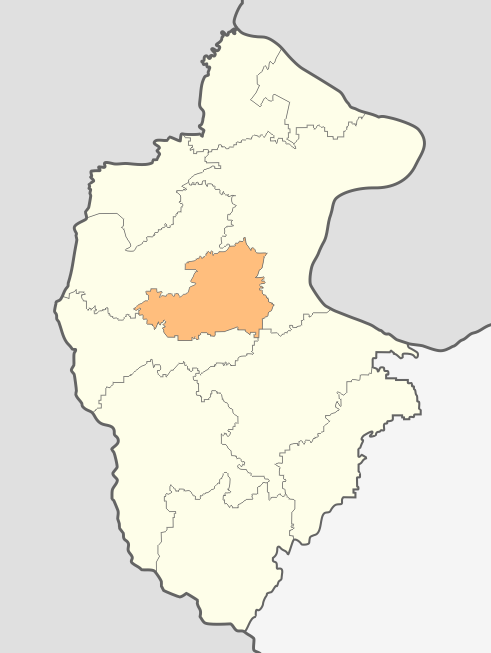
Gramada Municipality within Vidin Province

Gramada Municipality includes the following 8 places (towns are shown in bold):

Town/Village	Cyrillic	Population (December 2009)
**Gramada**	**Грамада**	1,647
Boyanovo	Бояново	17
Brankovtsi	Бранковци	140
Medeshevtsi	Медешевци	94
Milchina Laka	Милчина лъка	72
Sratsimirovo	Срацимирово	66
Toshevtsi	Тошевци	241
Vodna	Водна	107
Total		2,384

== Demography ==
The following table shows the change of the population during the last four decades.

Gramada Municipality
**Year**	1975	1985	1992	**2001**	2005	2007	2009	**2011**
**Population**	5,509	4,361	4,128	3,196	2,728	2,530	2,384	2,007
Sources: Census 2001, Census 2011, „pop-stat.mashke.org“,

== See also ==
- Provinces of Bulgaria
- Municipalities of Bulgaria
- List of cities and towns in Bulgaria
