= Ivan Iskrov =

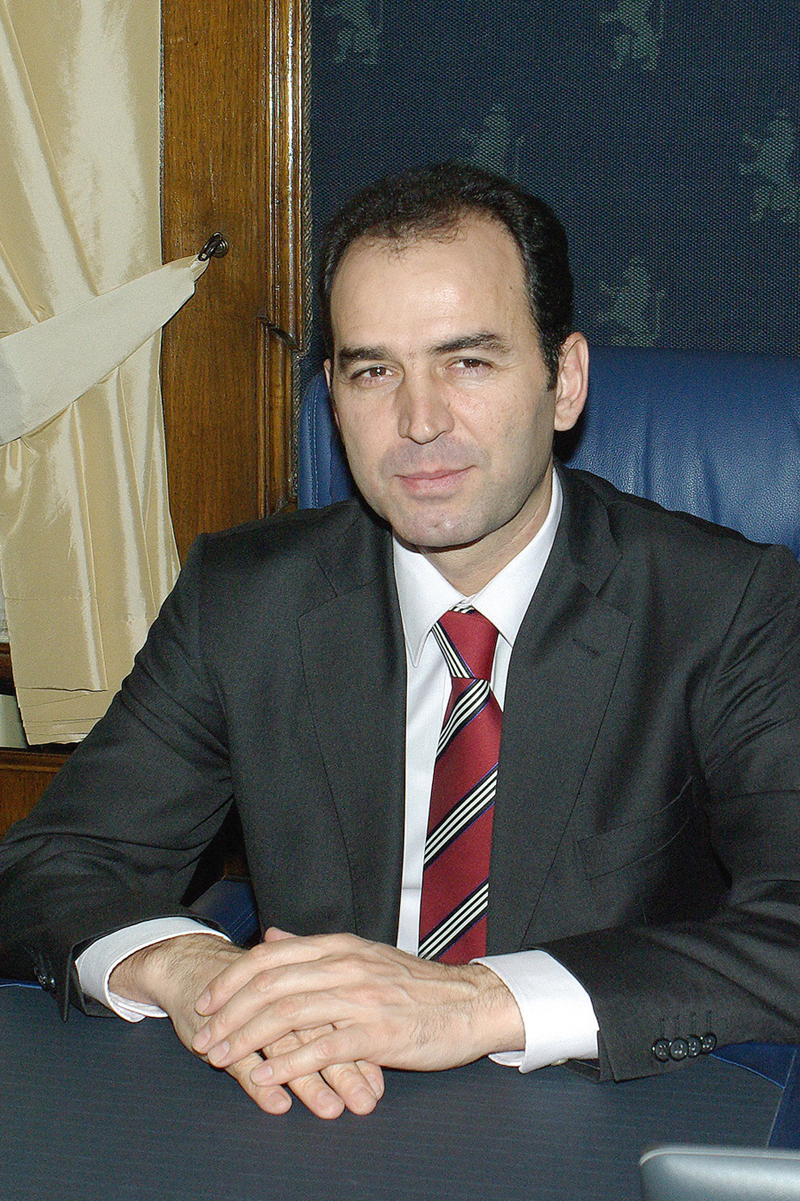
Ivan Iskrov

Ivan Iskrov (Bulgarian: Иван Искров) (born 26 March 1967 in Pirdop) was the governor of the Bulgarian National Bank from October 2003 to July 2015.

== Biography ==
Ivan Iskrov was born on 26 March 1967 in Pirdop. He graduated from the University of National and World Economy, Sofia and obtained an MSc in economics (finance and credit) in 1992. From 1992 to 1993 he taught Banking Management at the University of National and World Economy. In 1994 he specialised Business Communications, educational program organised in Sofia by the US Treasury and the Federal Reserve Bank of Chicago. Ivan Iskrov took postgraduate studies on Mortgage Securities and Markets in USA (1999).

He was an MP at the Bulgarian National Assembly from 2001 to 2003, Chairman of the Budget and Finance Commission, Member of the European Integration Commission, and Member of the Bulgaria-EU Joint Parliamentary Commission. In October 2003 Ivan Iskrov was appointed to the position Governor of the Bulgarian National Bank.

The longest-serving governor in the BNB history. His two terms as governor mark one of the most important stages in the development of the BNB. During the same time the BNB weathers some of the most serious challenges (of global and domestic origin) in the latest history of the central bank. During that period the BNB is prepared for membership (and since 2007 becomes a full-fledged member) in the European System of Central Banks. Ivan Iskrov is a member of the General Council of the European Central Bank between 1 January 2007 and 15 July 2015, a member of the General Board of the European Systemic Risk Board between January 2011 and 15 July 2015, and governor for Bulgaria in the International Monetary Fund in the period October 2003 – July 2015. After the onset of the global crisis the currency board managed by the BNB continues to operate smoothly and plays a key role in maintaining the financial stability in the country. The gross international reserves increase. Bulgaria's payments system is prepared for joining the euro area. One of the biggest banknote producers in the world is attracted in Bulgaria with the setting up of the joint venture between the BNB Printing Works and the French François-Charles Oberthür Group. The BNB banking supervision is among the first in the European Union to develop and apply a set of macroprudential supervisory measures in the banking sector. Thus the sector faces the global crisis with high capital and liquidity and for that reason no bank in Bulgaria fails as a direct result of the crisis. A problem with lending in Swiss francs is averted in the Bulgarian banking system. Contagion from the crisis in Greece to the Greek-owned banks in Bulgaria is prevented. Furthermore, in 2014 the effects from the revocation of the license of Corporate Commercial Bank (because of insolvency due mostly to internal fraud) remained isolated and confidence in the banking system was preserved, despite the acute political crisis then.

His work was recognized with Commander of the Order of Leopold by the Belgian government. On 15 July 2010 he was made a Commander of the Belgian Order of Leopold.

== Family ==
Ivan Iskrov is married to Ginka Iskrova, Tax Director at PwC (Bulgaria). They have a child.

== Bibliography ==
- "Money, Banks, and Monetary Policy", University Publishing House "St. Clement of Ohrid" (in Bulgarian: Пари, банки и парична политика, Университетско издателство "Св. Климент Охридски", София, 1998)
