= Supreme Court of Cassation of Bulgaria =

The Supreme Court of Cassation (Bulgarian: Върховен касационен съд, romanized: Vǎrhoven kasatsionen sǎd) is the final court of appeal in the Republic of Bulgaria. Its work is governed by the Constitution of 1991. According to Article 124, it exercises supreme judicial power over the application of the law in all courts. The Supreme Court of Cassation may even overturn a final decision by a lower court. It also takes part in the appointment of judges for the Constitutional Court. The Supreme Court of Cassation, however, does have to hand cases over to the Constitutional Court when it finds a contradiction between the laws and the Constitution of the Republic. If a question of constitutionality arises, the court may refer it to the Constitutional Court.

The Chairman of the Court is appointed for a seven-year term and is dismissed by the President of the Republic on motion from the Supreme Judicial Council. The chairman is not eligible for a second term.

== History ==
It was established in 1878. Its first chairman was Dimitar Grekov.

The Supreme Court of Cassation was opened on May 25, 1880, by virtue of the Law on the Structure of Courts.

After the September 9 coup in 1944, the government began to pass ordinances-laws, which created an extraordinary People's Court. A large number of judges and other members of the judiciary were interned, sent to prison, or killed. The Dimitrov Constitution of 1947 established a new judicial organization. The Supreme Court of Cassation, the Supreme Administrative Court and the Supreme Military Court were merged into the newly established Supreme Court of the People's Republic of Bulgaria. Its members were elected by the National Assembly, the majority being members of the Bulgarian Communist Party. The Supreme Court heard as a first instance the cases of defendants, generals, prosecutors, judges and investigators, and as a second instance it rules on appeals and protests against judicial acts of other judicial bodies.

In the following years, the court was required to report on its activities to the National Assembly and its Presidium (after 1971 — the State Council). It consisted of a Criminal, Civil, and Military College, and even received the right of legislative initiative.
