= Sratsimirovo =

Village in Vidin Province, Bulgaria

Coordinates: 43°49′50″N 22°44′06″E

Sratsimirovo is a village in northwestern Bulgaria. It is located in Gramada Municipality, Vidin District.

The name is often shortened to Sratsimir or Sracimir (after the railway station serving the village).

== History ==
In Turkish times it was a small village and was often attacked and looted. The old name of the village is Gol tupan, and during the campaign for renaming of settlements after 1934 it was renamed Sratsimirovo. In 1978, Sratsimirovo was separated from the municipality of Dunavtsi and joined the municipality of Gramada.
