= Toshevtsi =

Toshevtsi Тошевци
- Village
- Location in Bulgaria
- Coordinates: 43.815°N 22.626°E
- Country: Bulgaria
- Province: Vidin Province
- Municipality: Gramada Municipality
- Elevation: 266 m (873 ft)

Population (2013-12-31)
  - Total: 162
- Postal code: 3825

Toshevtsi (Bulgarian: Тошевци) is a village in north-western Bulgaria. It is located in the municipality of Gramada, Vidin Province.

As of December 2013 the village has a population of 162.
