= Ivan Tatarchev =

Personal details
- Born: 29 August 1930 Sofia, Bulgaria
- Died: 24 December 2008 (aged 78)
- Profession: Jurist, Lawyer

Ivan Nikolov Tatarchev (Bulgarian: Иван Николов Татарчев; 29 August 1930 – 24 December 2008) was a Bulgarian jurist who served as the chief prosecutor of Bulgaria between 1992 and 1999.

== Biography ==
In 1952, Tatarchev finished his legal studies at Sofia University. Between 1958 and 1961, he was barred from practicing law for political reasons.

Tatarchev was known for his patriotic views. His grandfather, Mihail Tatarchev, was the brother of Hristo Tatarchev, one of the founders of IMRO.
