= Constitutional Court of Bulgaria =

The Constitutional Court of Bulgaria (Bulgarian: Конституционен съд) is in charge of reviewing the constitutionality of acts and statutes brought before it, as well as the compliance of these laws with international treaties to which Bulgaria is a party. The 12 members of the Constitutional Court serve a nine-year term. Four of the justices are elected by the National Assembly, four are appointed by the President, and the remaining four are selected from among the judges on the Supreme Court of Cassation and the Supreme Administrative Court.

== List of chairmen ==
Name	Term
Asen Manov	3 October 1991 – 18 October 1994
Asen Manov	18 October 1994 – 14 October 1997
Zhivko Stalev	14 October 1997 – 19 October 2000
Hristo Danov	19 October 2000 – 17 February 2003
Rumen Yankov	28 February 2003 – 28 October 2003
Nedelcho Beronov	28 October 2003 – 3 October 2006
Rumen Yankov	8 November 2006 – 9 October 2009
Evgeni Tanchev	16 November 2009 – 15 November 2012
Dimitar Tokushev	4 March 2013 – 11 November 2015
Boris Velchev	16 November 2015 – 15 November 2021
Pavlina Panova	16 November 2021 – present

== List of members ==
Year	Chosen by the National Assembly (Note: Judges are colored by the party that proposed them, traditionally the largest party in Parliament.)				Chosen by the President (Note: Judges are colored by the party of the President.)				Chosen by the Supreme Administrative and Cassation courts			
1991	Lyuben Kornezov	Neno Nenovski	Pencho Penev	Ivan Parvanov (Note: Parvanov died in 1992. Parliament elected Stanislav Dimitrov to finish the term.)	Teodor Chipev	Milcho Kostov	Nikolay Pavlov	Tsanko Hadzhistoychev	Milena Zhabinska	Mladen Danailov	Alexandar Arabadzhiev	Asen Manov
1994	Todor Todorov	Dimitar Gochev	Pencho Penev	Ivan Parvanov	Georgi Markov	Milcho Kostov	Nikolay Pavlov	Tsanko Hadzhistoychev	Ivan Grigorov (Note: Grigorov resigned in 2000 to become chairman of the Supreme Cassation Court and was replaced by Penka Tomcheva.)	Mladen Danailov	Alexandar Arabadzhiev	Asen Manov
1997	Todor Todorov	Dimitar Gochev	Nedelcho Beronov	Ivan Parvanov	Georgi Markov	Zhivko Stalev (Note: Stalev resigned in 2000 and was replaced by Zhivan Belchev.)	Margarita Zlatareva	Tsanko Hadzhistoychev	Ivan Grigorov	Stefanka Stefanova	Alexandar Arabadzhiev	Asen Manov
2000	Todor Todorov	Dimitar Gochev	Nedelcho Beronov	Vasil Gotsev	Georgi Markov	Zhivko Stalev	Margarita Zlatareva	Hristo Danov (Note: Danov died in 2003 and was replaced by Lazar Gruev. Gruev resigned to become chairman of the Supreme Cassation Court in 2007 and was replaced by Snezhana Nacheva)	Ivan Grigorov	Stefanka Stefanova	Rumen Yankov	Lyudmil Neykov
2003	Emiliya Drumeva	Mariya Pavlova (Note: Pavlova died in 2007 and was replaced by Georgi Petkanov)	Nedelcho Beronov	Vasil Gotsev	Evgeni Tanchev	Zhivko Stalev	Margarita Zlatareva	Hristo Danov	Vladislav Slavov	Stefanka Stefanova	Rumen Yankov	Lyudmil Neykov
2006	Emiliya Drumeva	Mariya Pavlova	Krasen Stoychev	Vasil Gotsev	Evgeni Tanchev	Dimitar Tokushev	Plamen Kirov	Hristo Danov	Vladislav Slavov	Blagovest Punev	Rumen Yankov	Lyudmil Neykov
2009	Emiliya Drumeva	Mariya Pavlova	Krasen Stoychev	Tsanka Tsankova	Evgeni Tanchev	Dimitar Tokushev	Plamen Kirov	Vanyuskha Angusheva (Note: Angusheva died in 2012 and was replaced by Keti Markova.)	Vladislav Slavov	Blagovest Punev	Rumen Nenkov	Stefka Stoeva
2012	Atanas Atanasov	Grozdan Iliev	Krasen Stoychev	Tsanka Tsankova	Boris Velchev	Dimitar Tokushev	Plamen Kirov	Vanyuskha Angusheva	Georgi Angelov	Blagovest Punev	Rumen Nenkov	Stefka Stoeva
2015	Atanas Atanasov	Grozdan Iliev	Konstantin Penchev	Tsanka Tsankova	Boris Velchev	Philip Dimitrov	Mariyana Karagyozova-Finkova	Vanyuskha Angusheva	Georgi Angelov	Tanya Raykovska	Rumen Nenkov	Stefka Stoeva
2018	Atanas Atanasov	Grozdan Iliev	Konstantin Penchev	Krasimir Vlahov	Boris Velchev	Philip Dimitrov	Mariyana Karagyozova-Finkova	Atanas Semov	Georgi Angelov	Tanya Raykovska	Nadezhda Dzhelepova	Pavlina Panova
2021	Desislava Atanasova (Note: Due to the political crisis, these seats were left vacant until early 2024.)	Borislav Belazelkov	Konstantin Penchev	Krasimir Vlahov	Yanaki Stoilov	Philip Dimitrov	Mariyana Karagyozova-Finkova	Atanas Semov	Sonya Yankulova	Tanya Raykovska	Nadezhda Dzhelepova	Pavlina Panova
2024	Desislava Atanasova	Borislav Belazelkov	Orlin Kolev	Krasimir Vlahov	Yanaki Stoilov	Sasho Penov	Nevin Feti Osman-Yordanova	Atanas Semov	Sonya Yankulova	Galina Toneva-Dacheva	Nadezhda Dzhelepova	Pavlina Panova

== See also ==
- 2013 student protest in Bulgaria
