= Neno Kolev Nenovsky =

Neno Kolev Nenovsky (Bulgarian: Нено Колев Неновски) (16 March 1934 – 14 May 2004) was a Bulgarian jurist, scientist and was a former judge of the Constitutional Court of Bulgaria, where he served from (1991-1994). He was born in the village of Balvan in Veliko Tarnovo Municipality.

== Biography ==
Nenovski began university studies in 1953, at the Faculty of Law of the University of Sofia. He completed the degree in 1959. Nenovsky later attended the Faculty of Law of State University, where he received a PhD in law in 1970. Nenovsky specialized in the European University Center of Nancy, France (1965-1966), in the International Faculty of Comparative Law in Strasbourg, France (1969). His scientific career includes: Assistant at the Faculty of Sofia University "St. Kliment Ohridski "general theory of state and law (1962-1975 years). Senior research associate at the Institute for Legal Studies at the Bulgarian Academy of Sciences (1975), Professor at the Institute for Legal Research, at the Bulgarian Academy of Sciences (1990). Ph.D. (1970). Corresponding Member of the Academy of Sciences (1995). In October 1991 he became a judge of the Constitutional Court of Bulgaria.

== Government and administrative positions ==
He was a Member of the Constitutional Court of the Republic of Bulgaria (1991-1994), Vice-President of the Legislative Council in the 37th National Assembly (1995-1997), Vice-Chairman of the Advisory Council on Legislation of the 39th National Assembly (2001-2004). Deputy Director of the Institute of Legal Studies (1989-1991). Head of Department at the Institute of Legal Studies (1989-1991, 1995-2004). Deputy Chairman of the Jurisprudence of the Supreme Attestation Commission (1990-1991), member of the Presidium of the Higher Attestation Commission (1995-1997).

== Lectures and scientific achievements ==
His academic interests were the Philosophy and general theory of law, historical development of legal doctrines, constitutional law and constitutional justice.

He was Chairman of the management of the Law Section at the Union of Scientists in Bulgaria (1990-1991). Founding member of the Bulgarian Association for Philosophy of Law and Social Philosophy (1985), which he chaired from 1990. Member of the editorial board of the journal "Legal Thought" in 1990, the editor of the same journal (1995-1999). Editor and founder of the magazine "Legal World" from 1999 until his death in 2004. Member of the main editing Encyclopedia National Encyclopedia Bulgaria (BAS).
