= Boris Velchev =

Bulgarian jurist

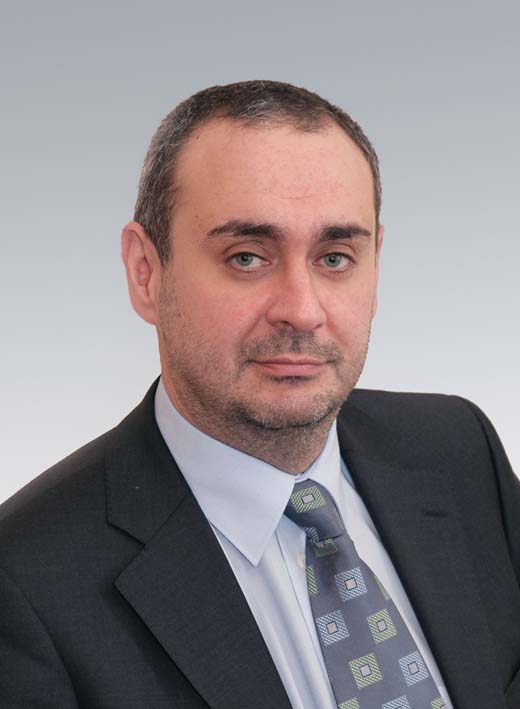

Personal details
- Born: 26 April 1962 (age 63) Sofia, Bulgaria
- Profession: Jurist, Judge

Boris Vladimirov Velchev (Bulgarian: Борис Владимиров Велчев) (born 26 April 1962) is a Bulgarian jurist who served as the chief prosecutor of Bulgaria between 2006 and 2012, being the youngest person to hold the position.

== Biography ==
In 1981, Velchev graduated from the First English Language School in Sofia. He was subsequently enrolled as a student at the juridical faculty of Sofia University, earning the right to practice law in 1990.

Since 1 November 2012, Velchev has been a judge at the Constitutional Court of Bulgaria.

In addition to his native Bulgarian, Velchev also speaks English and Russian. His hobbies include the study of history and numismatics.
