= 2020 in Bulgaria =

- Decades: 2000s; 2010s; 2020s
- See also: Other events of 2020; Timeline of Bulgarian history

Events in the year 2020 in Bulgaria.

== Incumbents ==
- President: Rumen Radev
- Prime Minister: Boyko Borisov

== Events ==
Ongoing – 2020–2021 Bulgarian protests; COVID-19 pandemic in Bulgaria

=== January ===
- 8 January – Prime Minister Boyko Borisov, along with the heads of state of Turkey, Russia, and Serbia, formally inaugurate the TurkStream gas pipelines.
- 13 – 19 January – The 2020 World Junior Ice Hockey Championships – Division III was held in Sofia. Iceland won the tournament.

=== February ===
- 4 February – President Rumen Radev withdraws his support for the ruling government coalition between the GERB party and the United Patriots, blaming it for the prevalent corruption in the country and lack of reform.
- 5 February – The U.S. places sanctions on Bulgarian judge Andon Mitalov who the U.S. State Department claimed was involved in "significant" corruption and had "severely compromised the independence" of the country's democratic institutions.
- 22 February – Following a far-right attack in Germany that killed at least nine people, the annual rally held by neo-Nazis in Sofia was banned, the first since it began in 2003.

=== March ===
- 8 March – The first confirmed cases of COVID-19 are reported in the country: a 27-year-old man from Pleven and a 75-year-old woman from Gabrovo.
- 11 March – A 66-year-old woman from Lom tested positive for COVID-19 and died, becoming the first victim of the virus in the country.
- 13 March – After the number of confirmed cases in the country more than tripled to 23 over one day, a state of emergency was declared until April 13. Schools, shopping centres, cinemas, restaurants, and other places of business were closed with only essential businesses remaining open. All sports events, including Bulgarian Football Union matches, were suspended. Travel was restricted to 14 countries and police were given special powers for quarantine enforcement.

=== April ===
- 3 April – The National Assembly approved the government's proposal to extend the state of emergency by one month until 13 May.
- 30 April – Bulgaria applies for ERM II, a mandatory step to joining the Eurozone, due to join along with Croatia in July.

=== May ===
- 4 May – Director of ECDC Dr. Andrea Ammon listed Bulgaria as the only country monitored by the centre still seeing an increase in newly registered cases.
- 9 May – Targovishte, the last Bulgarian province without any registered COVID-19 cases, confirmed its first COVID-19 case.
- 11 May – The Max Planck Institute for Evolutionary Anthropology in Leipzig, Germany, publishes the result of radiocarbon and DNA analysis from fossils that were found in the Bacho Kiro cave, Gabrovo Province. The result, showing that the fossils belong to Homo sapiens instead of Neanderthals, indicates that modern humans may have arrived in Europe thousands of years earlier than previously thought.
- 25 May – The Bulgarian captain of the cargo ship Tommi Ritscher, who was kidnapped at the port of Cotonou, Benin, in the Gulf of Guinea by pirates, is freed.

=== June ===
- 21 June – Grigor Dimitrov, the most successful Bulgarian ATP tennis player to date, announced that he has tested positive for COVID-19.

=== July ===
- 9 July – Protests begin throughout the country with the goal of removing Borisov's cabinet and Chief Prosecutor Ivan Geshev from office.
- 10 July
  - The ECB accepts Bulgaria and Croatia into ERM II, paving the way for their adoption of the euro. This is also the Eurozone's first major expansion in half a decade.
  - Thousands of protesters blocked the center of Sofia on Tsar Osvoboditel Blvd., between Orlov Most and Sofia University. Later in the day, head of the National Security Service General Krassimir Stanchev resigned after being asked to do so by President Rumen Radev.
- 14 July
  - The National Representation of Student Councils in Bulgaria accused pro-government police forces of illegally beating protesting students and demanded the resignations of police officers found responsible.
  - Chief Prosecutor Ivan Geshev released a series of wiretaps allegedly collected by the State Agency for National Security in which Aleksandar Paunov, Communist Party of Bulgaria leader and opposition MP, held a conversation with a Bulgarian exile. This led the Union of Democratic Forces to call on the prosecution to ban the communist party entirely, stating that it had supported the protests and "contributed to the destabilization of the country".
- 15 July – The opposition socialist party introduced a motion of no confidence against Borisov's government in parliament, accusing it of collaborating with the Bulgarian mafia. Concurrently, in response to the continued protests and reports of the use of violence by the police, Prime Minister Boyko Borisov asks his ministers for finance, the economy, and the interior to resign. However, the majority of protesters rejected these concessions and vowed to continue to protest until the entire government resigns.
- 21 July – The government survives a motion of no confidence by 124 votes against, 102 votes in favour, amidst the still ongoing large-scale anti-government protests.

=== August ===
- 7 August – Bulgarian security forces clamped down on demonstrators and dismantled anti-government barricades across the country in a major police sweep. The police operation comes a day after the Bulgarian government declared that it had no plans to step down from power.

=== September ===
- 3 September – The protests in the country became violent as protesting crowds attempt to storm the nation's parliament, leading to a night of fighting between demonstrators and security forces.
- 21 September – A court in the country sentenced two men, a Lebanese Australian and a Lebanese Canadian, to life in prison in absentia, for their roles in the suicide bombing of a bus in Burgas in 2012 that killed five Israeli tourists, the driver and the bomber. The whereabouts of the men is unknown and they are the subject of an Interpol red notice.

=== October ===
- 20 October – After new infections in the country hit a record, Health Minister Kostadin Angelov announced that the country would make wearing protective masks obligatory in all outdoor spaces on October 22 in an attempt to slow the spread of the virus by about 30% and help prevent the health system from being overwhelmed.
- 24 October – Sofia's mayor Yordanka Fandakova announces that it will close nightclubs and discos tomorrow for two weeks in an attempt to contain the spread of COVID-19. She also urges universities to switch to online education and appeals to businesses to have as many employees work from home as possible.
- 25 October – Prime Minister Boyko Borisov tests positive for COVID-19.

=== December ===
- 20 December – The government announces the suspension of all flights between the country and the United Kingdom from tomorrow until January 31. Anyone who already arrived from the UK is required to quarantine for 10 days.

== Deaths ==
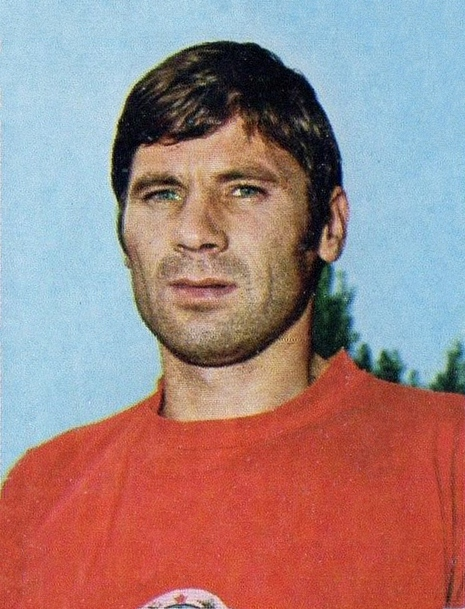
Petko Petkov

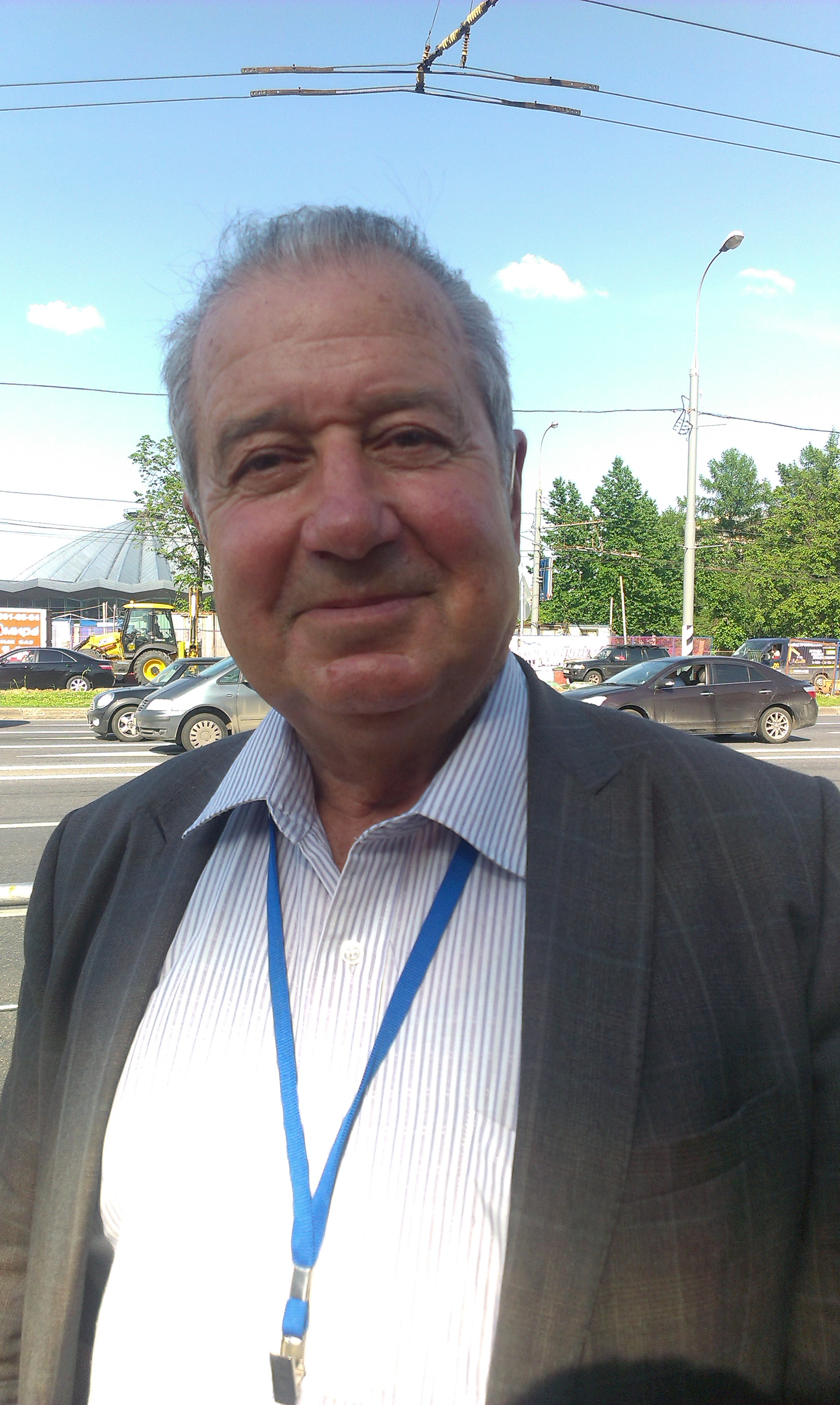
Blagovest Sendov

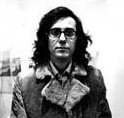
Christo Javacheff

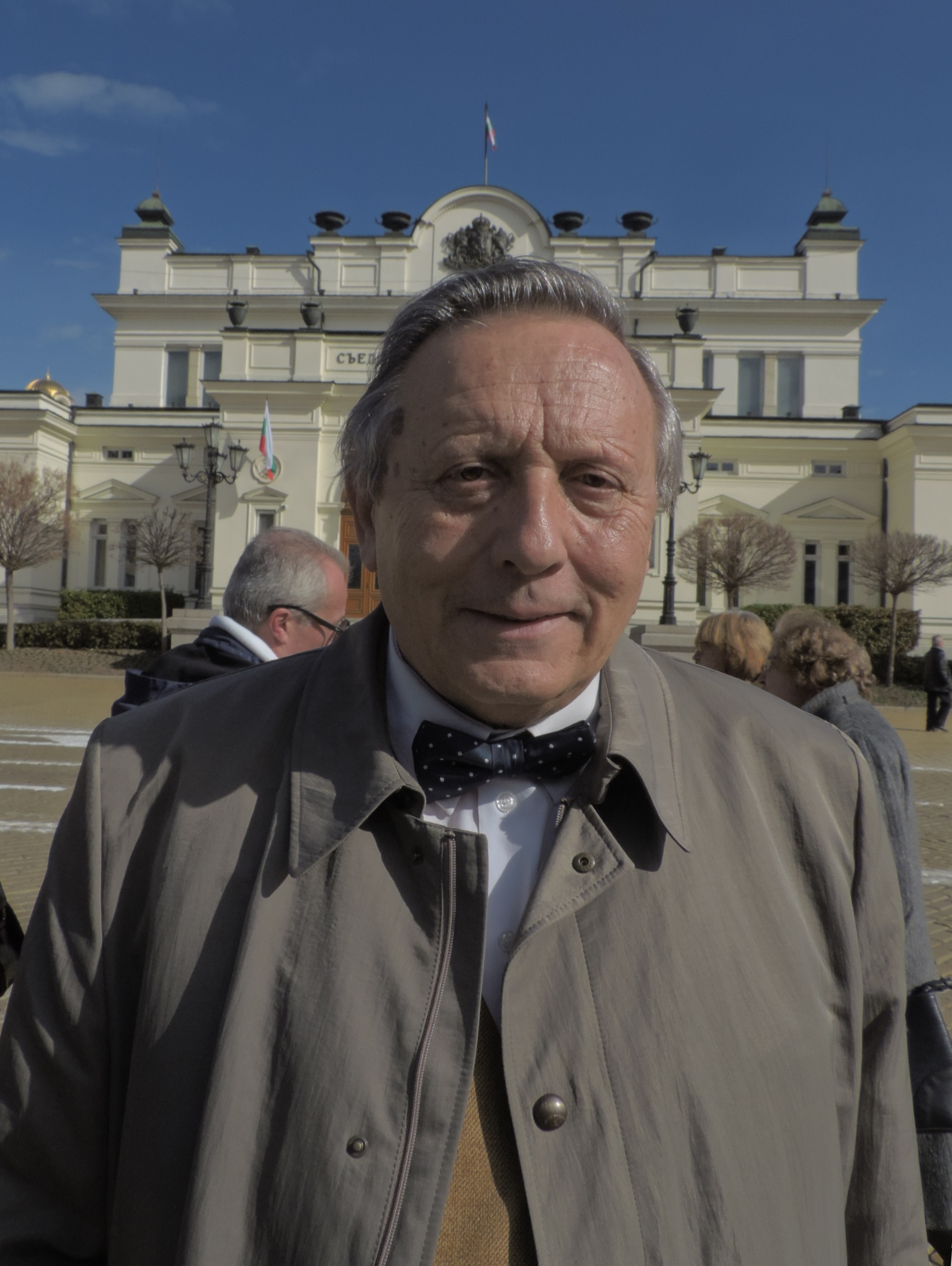
Stefan Vodenicharov

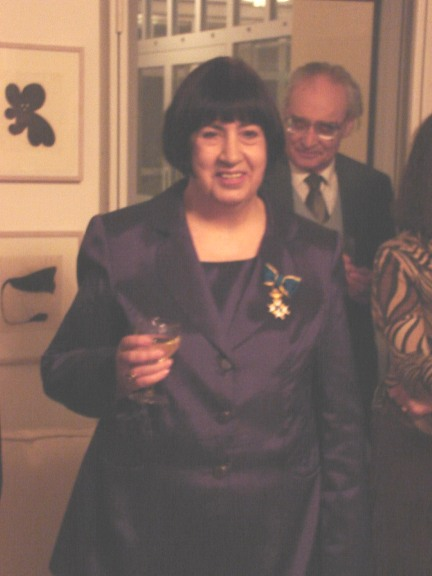
Vera Gancheva

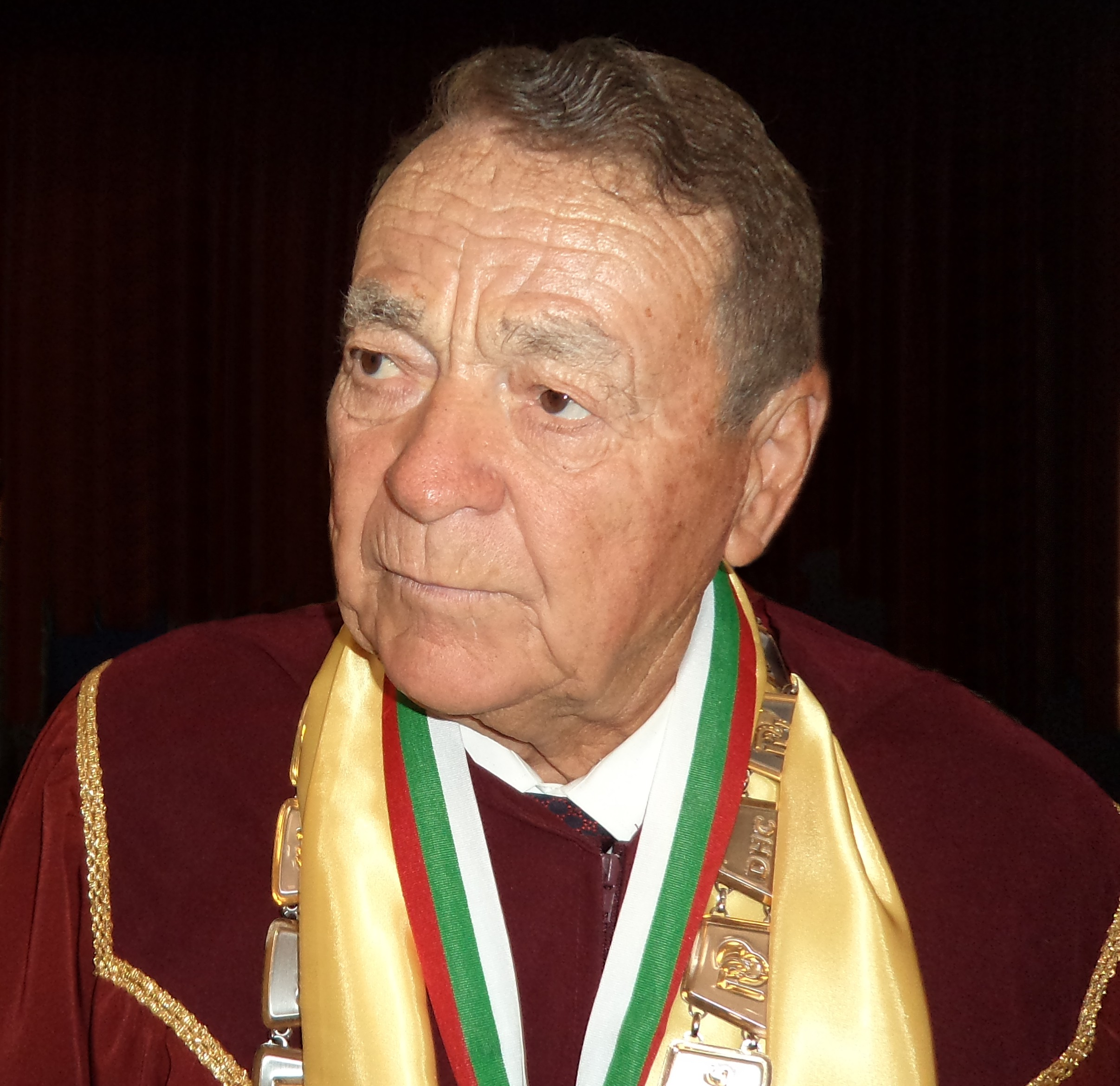
Ignat Kaneff

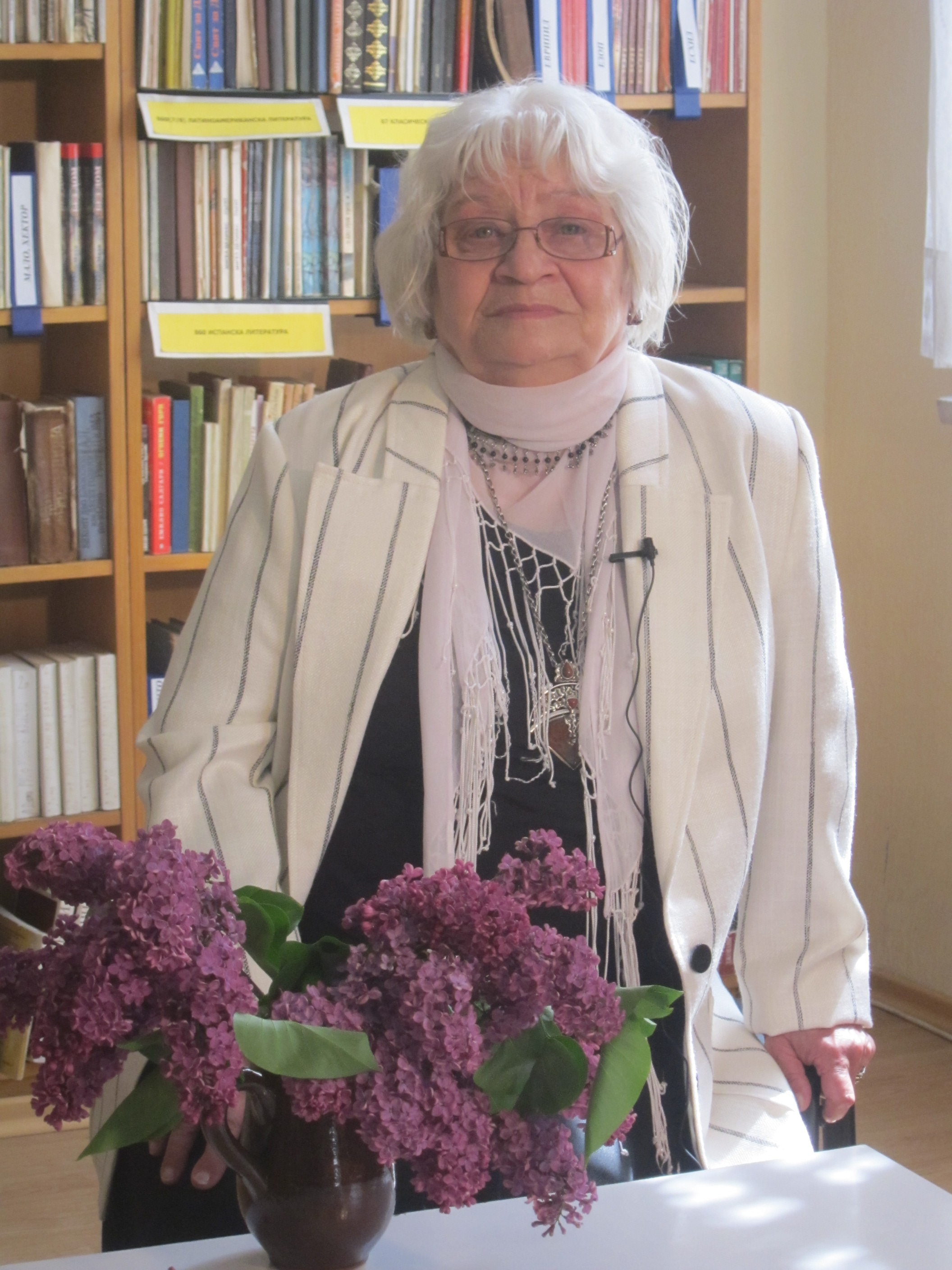
Kina Kadreva

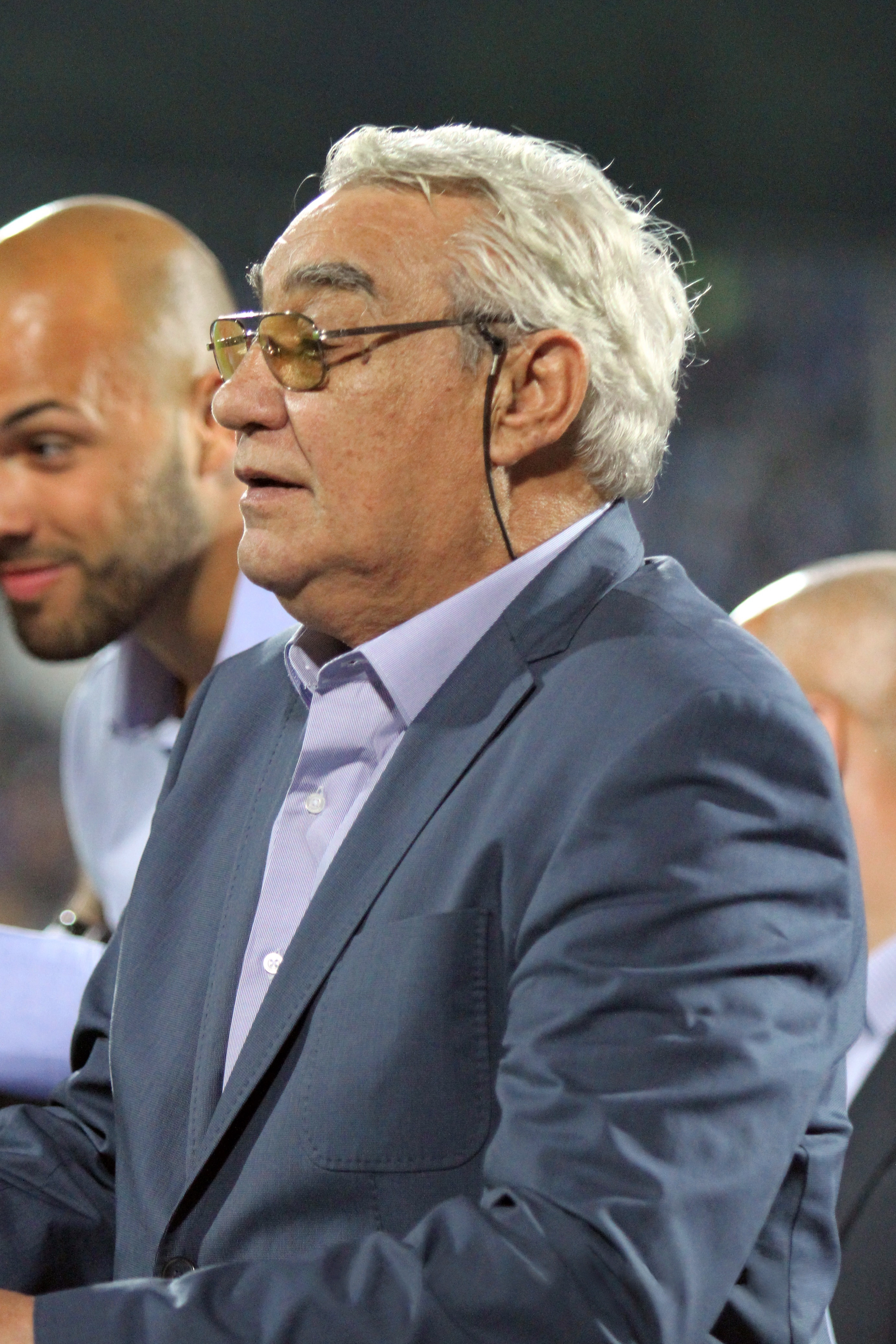
Biser Mihaylov

=== January ===
- 1 January – Silva Zurleva, journalist (b. 1958).
- 5 January – Vanko Urumov, artist (b. 1941).
- 8 January – Teofan Sokerov, artist (b. 1943).
- 10 January – Petko Petkov, football player and manager (b. 1946).
- 15 January – Todor Valchev, financier (b. 1922).
- 19 January – Blagovest Sendov, diplomat, mathematician and politician (b. 1932).
- 22 January – Petko Ogoiski, journalist, writer and politician (b. 1929).
- 24 January – Andrey Daniel, artist (b. 1952).

=== February ===
- 1 February – Ivan Staykov, composer (b. 1931).
- 7 February – Ivan Zabunov, historian, public figure and politician (b. 1948).
- 12 February – Penka Pavlova, folk singer (b. 1934).
- 15 February – Irina Chmihova, pop singer and music pedagogue (b. 1930).

=== March ===
- 7 March – Ivan Sarandev, literary critic and historian (b. 1934).
- 26 March – Simeon Shterev, musician and composer (b. 1943).

=== April ===
- 9 April – Valcho Kamarashev, actor (b. 1937).
- 19 April
  - Milen Tsvetkov, journalist (b. 1966).
  - Stanislav Boyadzhiev, Olympic basketball player (b. 1945).
- 26 April
  - Nikola Indjov, poet, publicist, essayist and translator (b. 1935).
  - Todor Simov, volleyball player and coach (b. 1929).
- 30 April – Dzhenko Sabev, Olympic equestrian (b. 1947).

=== May ===
- 6 May – Borislav Georgiev, linguist (b. 1958).
- 12 May – Hristina Lyutova, folk singer (b. 1940).
- 14 May – Georgi Belev, poet (b. 1945).
- 18 May – Sofia Nestorova, poet (b. 1955).
- 31 May
  - Christo Vladimirov Javacheff, artist (b. 1935).
  - Tseno Tsenov, wrestler (b. 1939).

=== June ===
- 5 June – Boris Gaganelov, footballer and manager (b. 1941).
- 5 June – Vilhelm Kraus, politician, Minister of Transport (b. 1949).
- 9 June – Stefan Vodenicharov, academic, President of the Bulgarian Academy of Sciences and Minister of Education (b. 1944).
- 10 June – Vera Gancheva, translator, publisher and author (b. 1943).
- 26 June – Yordan Milanov, military officer (b. 1924).

=== July ===
- 5 July – Katya Vodenicharova, children's book writer (b. 1926).
- 9 July – Metodiy Grigorov, choir conductor (b. 1937).
- 10 July
  - Antonio Krastev, weightlifter, world champion (b. 1961).
  - Georgi Yordanov, football player (b. 1947).
- 11 July – Gergina Toncheva, teacher (b. 1932).
- 12 July
  - Mirjana Basheva, poet (b. 1947).
  - Ignat Kanev, construction contractor (b. 1926).
- 15 July – Vasil Stoychev, actor (b. 1935).
- 27 July
  - Stefan Karastoyanov, geographer (b. 1944).
  - Kina Kadreva, children's book writer (b. 1931).
- 30 July – Ivan Kutuzov, cartoonist (b. 1956).

=== August ===
- 5 August – Ivanka Vancheva, Olympic javelin thrower (b. 1953).
- 9 August
  - Dimitrina Gyurova, director and drama teacher (b. 1934).
  - Stefan Getsov, footballer (b. 1929).
- 12 August – Biser Mihailov, football player and goalkeeper (b. 1943).
- 18 August – Ambrose Dorostolski, Orthodox prelate, Metropolitan Bishop of Dorostol (b. 1942).
- 19 August – Lyutviyan Mollova, Olympic javelin thrower (b. 1947).
- 24 August – Stoyan Alexandrov, financier and politician (b. 1949).

=== September ===
- 6 September – Lachezar Elenkov, poet (b. 1936).
- 14 September – Petko Christov, Roman Catholic prelate and Bishop of Nicopolis (b. 1950).
- 16 September – Simeon Peshov, entrepreneur (b. 1941).
- 21 September – Dimitar Kerelezov, writer and poet (b. 1938).
- 26 September – Svetozar Nedelchev, actor (b. 1933).
- 30 September – Atanas Vanchev de Tracy, poet (b. 1940).

=== November ===
- 13 November – Vidin Apostolov, footballer (b. 1941).
- 23 November – Nikola Spasov, footballer (b. 1958).
- 26 November
  - Vladimir Ivanov, Olympic sprinter (b. 1955).
  - Dimitar Largov, footballer (b. 1936).
  - Kamen Tchanev, operatic tenor (b. 1964).

=== December ===
- 5 December – Mincho Yovchev, politician and former Deputy Prime Minister (b. 1942).

== See also ==
- List of years in Bulgaria
- 2020 in Bulgaria
- 2020 in Bulgarian sport
