= Era Natarasan =

Educationalist, School Principal, Writer

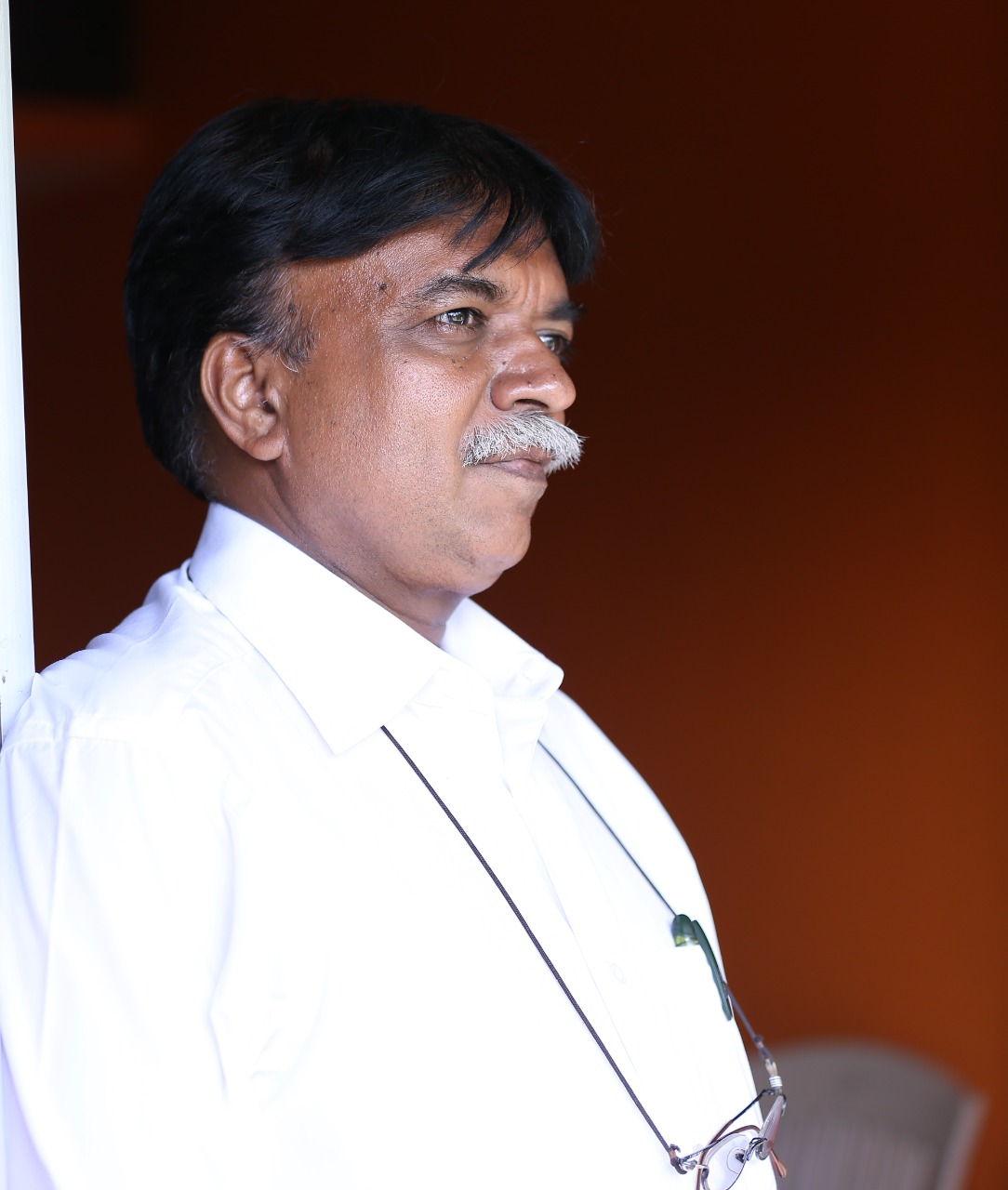
- Born: 8 December 1964 (age 61); Lalgudi, Trichy, Tamil Nadu, India
- Education: Jamal Mohamed College (1982–85); Annamalai University (1990–92); Alagappa University (2004)
- Occupation: Children's writer
- Title: Headmaster of the Krishnasamy Memorial Matric Higher Secondary School
- Awards: Sahitya Akademi Award (2014); Dr. Radhakrishnan Award (2008)
- Website: eranatarasan.com

Signature
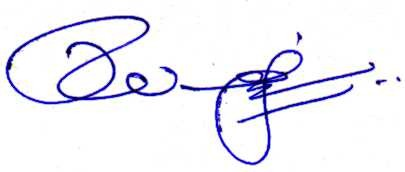

Era Natarasan (born 8 December 1964), popularly known as Ayesha Natarasan, is an Indian writer of children's books. He writes in Tamil and English. He is the author of Ayisha (in English) / Ayesha (a Novella) that has sold millions of copies in 12 languages. He has written more than 150 books most of them on science and Science Fiction including Vigyana vikramadhithyan kadhaigal which won the "Bal Sahitya Puraskar Award" for Children Literature, awarded by Sahitya Academy.

== Life and career ==
He is the Principal (Head master) of the Krishnasamy Memorial Matric Higher Secondary School, in the coastal town of Cuddalore near Puducherry, India.

Natarasan started his writing career as a poet in the Tamil weekly Ananda Vikatan in 1982 latter got interested to write short- stories Science and Science fiction for children so for he has written 83 books (72 in Tamil and 11 in English). The Vigyana Vikramadhithyan Kadhaikal(2009) has in itself the history of the medical inventions such as, polio vaccine, insulin, and malaria vaccine, which received the Bala Sahitya Puraskar the Annual Sahitya Academy Award for children literature in 2014.

His recent work for teachers Idhu yarudaya vagupparai (Whose Classroom Is It?) has received the Tamil Valarchithurai Virudhu in 2015, the award he has already received in 2001 for his book on Mathematics Kanidhathin kadhai. Natarasan has brought a series (10 books) in English under the title Scientific Revolution on ten of the most notable scientists such as Galileo Galilei, Gregor Mendel, Marie Curie, and Albert Einstein. He is the writer and editor of The Puthagam Pesudhu – a Tamil monthly for books.

== Short films ==
Natarasan's four stories have been made into short films.

1. Ayesha – was adopted into a 28 minutes short film by B. sivakumar Released in year of 2000, short film Ayesha won the National Film Award – Best short film of the year (National Film Festival, New Delhi)
2. Madhi – another short story (which was published by India Today (t) magazine) about the pathetic every day life of the third gender was filmed into a short film by cinematographer – Editor B. Lenin.
3. Rathathin Vannathil (the color of Blood) story which received the Ilakkiya chindhanai Award, was made into a feature film in the title Chellamma by Director Pa.sivakumar.
4. Vattathin Pakkangal (the sides of circle) was filmed as a feature film again by Director Pa.sivakumar.
5. Ayesha Natarasan also appears in a supporting role in Director Thangar Bachan's famous film Ammavin Kaipesi.

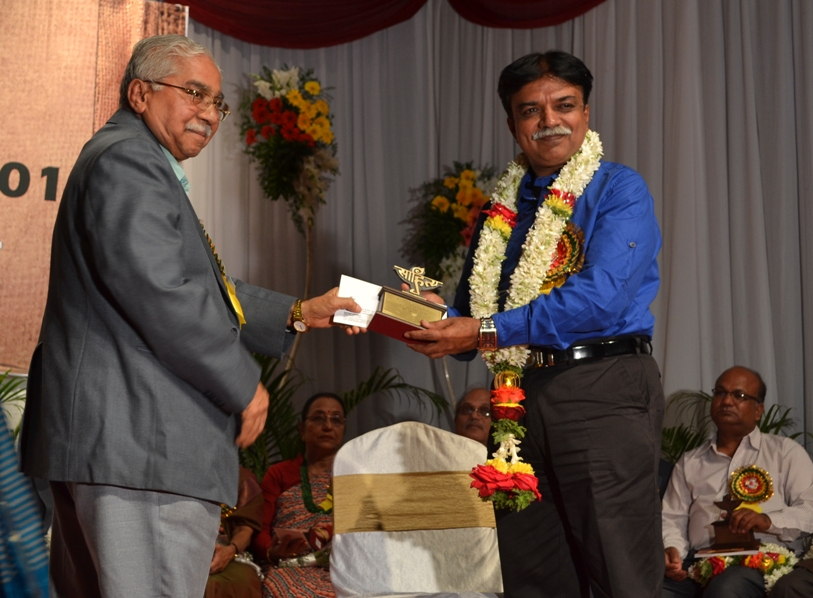
Era Natarasan receiving the Bala Sahidya Puraskar Award from Sahitya Akademi in November 2014.

== Educational activism ==
As an educational scholar and psychologist he is an activist supporting alternative education. He has translated Paulo Freire's Pedagogy of the Oppressed, a book on education into Tamil. He served as a master resource Person on Right to Education Act for UNICEF Sponsored workshops in Tamil Nadu. He played a major role as the member secretary in the Vasanthi Devi Committee on Alternate Education Policy (citizen's charter – against PM Modi's New Education Policy). Ayesha Natarasan was in the Text Book committee formed by the Govt of Tamil Nadu on the eve of the common syllabus formation. As an education activist Natarasan has periodically participated in many education debates on television as a key speaker, including Star Vijay(Neeya Naana), Sun TV (India) (virundhinar pakkam) etc., His articles and interviews on education have appeared in many leading magazines/Dailies such as The Hindu, Ananda Vikatan, The Times of India (city) Kungumam Vazhikatti, kalki Magazine etc., Era.Natarasan is also an active participant, Resource Person cum trainer in book festivals children content seminars and literary meets. Ayesha Era.Natarasan was the Chief Organiser of the "National Children's Book Festival" conducted in Cuddalore South India (from 10 to 15 November 2017 ) collectively by National Book Trust, Books For Children and Sahitya Akademi involving more than 50,000 children. Era Natarasan has given a discourse about the theme of "Books That Changed The World" in Anna Centenary Library on the date of 30 June 2018.

=== Other awards and honours ===
Year of award or honour	Name of award or honour	Awarding organisation
1995	Ilakiya Chindhanai Award (Best Short Story)	Ilakya Chindhanai, Chennai.
2001	Tamil Valarchithurai Award	Government of Tamil Nadu.
2002	Thirpur Tamil Sangam Award (Best Translation award)	Thirupur Tamil Sangam.
2008	Dr. Radhakrishnan Award	Government of Tamil Nadu.
2013	Tamil Valarchithurai Award	Government of Tamil Nadu.
2014	Vikatan Award (Best children fiction)	Ananda Vikatan.
2014	Nigari Award (Samathuva Arisiyar of the year)	Manarkeni Pathippagam (publications).
2014	Bal Sahitya Puraskar Award	Sahitya Akademi, Government of India.
2015	Sujatha Award (Best Siru Pathirigai)	Uyirmmai magazine, Sujatha Trust.
2016	Distinguished Alumni Award	Jamal mohamed college.

== Notable works ==
- Vaasik kalam (2017, Bharathi Puthakalayam)
- Oru Thozhanum Moonru Nanbargalum (2006, Bharathi Puthakalayam)
- Rose (2002, Books for children)
- Ayesha (2000, Bharathi Puthakalayam)
- kodhaidoscope (2014, Bharathi Puthakalayam)
- Srinrvasa Ramanujam-125 (Bharathi Puthakalayam)
- Kanitha Methaigalin Facebook, ISBN 9789381908945. (2012, Books for children)
- Neengalum Vingani Aaga Vendum Endru Vrumbugireerkala, ISBN 9789383661718 Bharathi Puthakalayam
- Nano Thozhilnutpam, ISBN 9789380325996 (2010, Bharathi Puthakalayam)
- Eyarpiyal Parisothanaigal, ISBN 9789384421205 (2000, Bharathi Puthakalayam)
- Booma. ISBN 9789381908761 (Bharathi Puthakalayam)
- Darwin School, ISBN 9789384421335 (2014, Bharathi Puthakalayam)
- Ureka Count, ISBN 978818476617-2 (2000, vikatan)
- Michael Faraday (Bharathi Puthakalayam)
- Oru Thooya Mozhiyin Thuyara Kuzhandhaikal, ISBN 978818737152-6 (Bharathi Puthakalayam)
- Madhi Ennum manidhanin maranam kurithu ,ISBN 9789381908013 (Sneha publication)
- Palitheen Paigal (novel), ISBN 978-818737152-6 (Bharathi Puthakalayam)
- Ithu Yarudaiya Vagupparai, ISBN 9789383661060 (2013, Bharathi Puthakalayam)
- Ulaga Kalviyalargal, ISBN 9789381908662 (2009, Bharathi Puthakalayam)
- Semmnozhigal, (Bharathi Puthakalayam)
- Ulagileye Magizhchiyana Siruvan, ISBN 9789381908976 (2012, Bharathi Puthakalayam)
- Nee Erumbukalai Nesikkiraayaa, ISBN 9789380325682 (Bharathi Puthakalayam)
- Vaanga Ariviyal Pesalaam, ISBN 9789385377372 (Bharathi Puthakalayam)
- Uruvaakum Ullam, ISBN 9789385377976 (Bharathi Puthakalayam)
- Pavlov, ISBN 978-93-85377-49-5 (Books for children)
- Antoine Lavisier, ISBN 978-93-85377-45-7 (Books for children)
- Issac Newton, ISBN 978-93-85377-44-0 (Bharathi Puthakalayam)
- Wings of Learning (will RTE service) (Indian University Press)

== See also ==
- List of Indian writers
