= Amvrosius Parashkevov =

Bulgarian Orthodox clergyman (1942–2020)

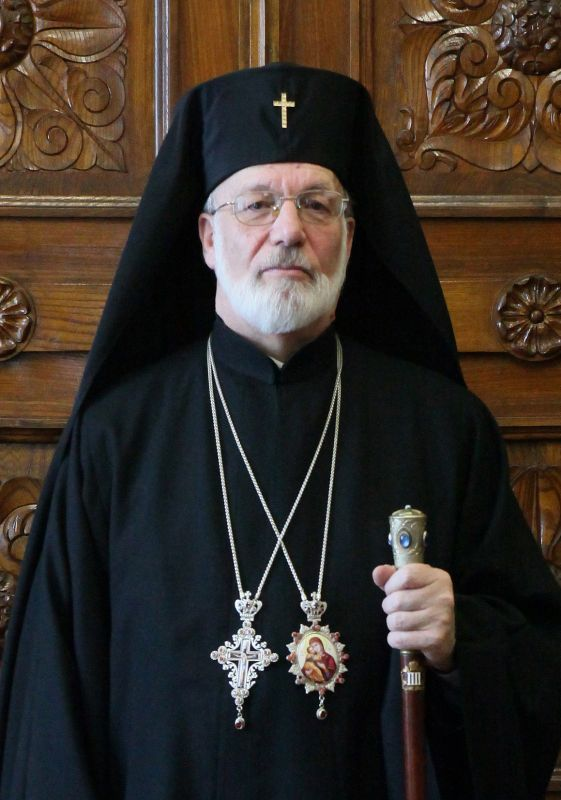
- Metropolitan Ambrose in 2010
- Native name: Амвросий Доростолски
- Church: Bulgarian Orthodox Church
- Appointed: 30 May 2019

Orders
- Ordination: 13 August 1983 (Tonsured); 19 October 1983 (Hierodeaconon); 15 August 1984 (Hieromonk); 3 April 1994 (Bishop)
- Rank: Metropolitan

Personal details
- Born: Alexander Alexandrov Parashkevov; June 9, 1942 Svishtov, Bulgaria
- Died: August 18, 2020 (aged 78) Silistra, Bulgaria
- Denomination: Eastern Orthodox Church

Ambrose of Dorostol (Bulgarian: Амвросий Доростолски) (9 June 1942 – 18 August 2020) born Alexander Alexandrov Parashkevov (Bulgarian: Александър Александров Парашкевов), was a Bulgarian Orthodox clergyman, being the Bishop of Branitsa from 1998 to 2010 and Metropolitan of Dorostol from 2010 to his death in 2020. He was a member of the Bulgarian Orthodox Church.

== Biography ==
He was born Alexander Alexandrov Parashkevov on 9 June 1942 in the town of Svishtov. He graduated from high school in his hometown and the University of Chemical Technology and Metallurgy in Sofia. In 1983 he entered the St. Kliment Ohridski Theological Academy, which he graduated from in 1987. He was tonsured a monk on 13 August 1983 in the Klisurski Monastery, under the name Ambrose by Metropolitan Filaret of Vidin . He was ordained a hierodeaconon in Chiprovtsi Monastery on 19 October 1983 by Metropolitan Filaret. From 1 November 1983 to 1 December 1984 he served as a diocesan deacon at the Vidin diocese. On 15 August 1984 he was ordained a hieromonk in the Klisura Monastery. From 1 December 1984 to 3 February 1988 he served at the Klisura Monastery, while taking care of the liturgical needs in various parishes of the Berkovitsa Archdiocese. On June 29, 1989, Metropolitan Dometian Vidinski elevated him to the rank of Archimandrite. From 3 February 1988 to 1 April 1994 he was abbot of the Lopushna Monastery.

In 1992 there was a schism in the Bulgarian Orthodox Church between the mainstream synod and the alternative synod. In 1994 Ambrose joined the Alternative Synod and was ordained a bishop on 3 April 1994 in the Chekotina Monastery by the leader of the schismatic church Metropolitan Pimen Nevrokopski. Ambrose was subsequently appointed Metropolitan for the Alternative Synod church. He established his seat in Berkovitsa, as the Bulgarian Orthodox clergy of Vidin would not allow him to come back into the city.

At the All-Orthodox Council in Sofia on 1 October 1998, Ambrose re-joined the mainstream Bulgarian Orthodox Church, and his ordination as Metropolitan under the alternative synod was recognized "as an extreme condescension" and he was accepted into the unity of the Bulgarian Orthodox Church with the rank of bishop and the title of Metropolitan of Branitsky. He also served as vicar for the Metropolitan of Vidin. At the same time, from 1999 to 2004 he also held the position of abbot of the Klisura Monastery, managing to repair and stabilize it financially.

On January 17, 2010, he was elected Metropolitan of Dorostol by the Holy Synod of the Bulgarian Orthodox Church. Reportedly ten members of the Synod voted for Bishop Ambrose, two of the ballots were empty, and the rival candidate Bishop Pavel did not receive a single vote. On January 24, he was canonically confirmed and on January 30, 2010, he was installed on the throne of the Diocese of Dorostol .

After the death of Metropolitan Kiril of Varna, the Holy Synod of the Bulgarian Orthodox Church appointed Ambrose on 18 July 2013 as temporary viceroy of the Varna and Veliko Preslav.

Ambrose Dorostolski died of complications from COVID-19 in Silistra on 18 August 2020, during the COVID-19 pandemic in Bulgaria.
