= Yovchev =

Yovchev (Bulgarian: Йовчев) is a Bulgarian masculine surname, its feminine counterpart is Yovcheva. It may refer to

- Aleksandar Yovchev (born 1996), Bulgarian football player
- Georgi Yovchev (born 1950), Bulgarian Roman Catholic bishop
- Mincho Yovchev (1942–2020), Bulgarian politician
- Stanko Yovchev (born 1988), Bulgarian football player
- Tsvetlin Yovchev (born 1964), Bulgarian politician
- Yordan Yovchev (born 1973), Bulgarian gymnast
- Yovcho Yovchev (born 1991), Bulgarian cyclist
