= Bharathi Puthakalayam =

Book publishing house

- Industry: Publishing and Printing
- Headquarters: Chennai, India
- Owner: Toiling Masses Welfare Trust
- Website: thamizhbooks.com

Bharathi Puthakalayam (Tamil: பாரதி புத்தகாலயம்) is a book publishing house in Chennai, Tamil Nadu . It is the publication wing of non profitable organization ‘Toiling Masses Welfare Trust’. Started in 2002, it has more than 1000 titles spread across the whole range of Popular Science, Literature, Literary Theory, Social Sciences, Philosophy, Fine arts . It has around 30 branches all over Tamil Nadu. It publishes children's literature through its imprint ‘Books for Children’. Books published by Bharathi have won awards including the Sahitya Academy award for Children's books (Bala Sahidya Purashkar) for the year 2013, for its Fiction Vingnana Vikramathithyan by Ayisha.Era Natarasan.
