= National Children's Book Festival =

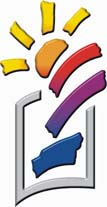
The National Children's Book Festival Logo

The National Children's Book Festival is held annually each May in Sliven, Bulgaria. The festival was established in 1999 by Rositsa Petrova-Vasileva. It is organized by the Sava Dobroplodni Regional Library in Sliven, with the support of the Ministry of Culture, the Agency for Bulgarians Abroad, and the Bulgarian Book Association.

== Description ==
The National Children's Book Festival aims to provide an opportunity for anyone involved in the process of creating and distributing children's books – writers, publishers, illustrators, book distributors, teachers, psychologists, library specialists, etc. – to meet and discuss the present and future state of children's books publishing, and to outline new directions and forms for increasing children's interest in books and reading. The program of the festival every year includes: book bazaars, the promotion of writers and publishing companies, literary duels and competitions, discussions on problems of books for children, exhibitions, performances, concerts, and carnival processions.

Since 2002, the organizers of the National Children's Book Festival have worked in partnership with similar children's festivals in Serbia, Italy, Germany, Russia, Bosna and Herzegovina, Montenegro and others. In 2006, joint projects were formed with the theatrical foundation Aida, in Verona, Italy.

The National Children's Book Festival has been a member of the Association of Balkan Festivals of Children's Literature since 2008.

== Konstantin Konstantinov award ==
A National Award named for Konstantin Konstantinov has been awarded since 2004 for contributions to children's book publishing in four categories: publishing house, writer, illustrator, and lifetime achievement. The co-founders of the award were the Ministry of Culture, the Sava Dobroplodni Regional Library, and the Sliven Rotary Club. Aside from a monetary award, the prize includes a small sculpture, and a diploma.

The first winner of the award was the poet Valeri Petrov, and the first winning publishing company was Fiut. Other winners have included:

- In the "Lifetime Achievement" category: Leda Mileva, Georgi Konstantinov, Marko Ganchev, Ivan Tsanev, Katya Vodenicharova, Kina Kadreva, Lilyana Stefanova, and Georgi Mishev.
- In the "Writer" category: Victor Samuilov, Sevda Sevan, Petya Alexandrova, Pancho Pantchev, Maya Dalgacheva, Julia Spiridonova – Yulka, Vesela Flamburari, Angelina Zhekova, and Bozhana Apostolova.
- In the "Publishing Company" category: Fiut, Hermes, Janet -45, Pan, Zlatnoto pate, Egmont Bulgaria and Damyan Yakov.
- In the "Illustrator" category: Spas Spasov, Ralitsa Manuilova, Oleg Topalov, Yasen Gyuzelev, Petar Stanimirov and Boris Stoilov.
