= Kiril of Varna =

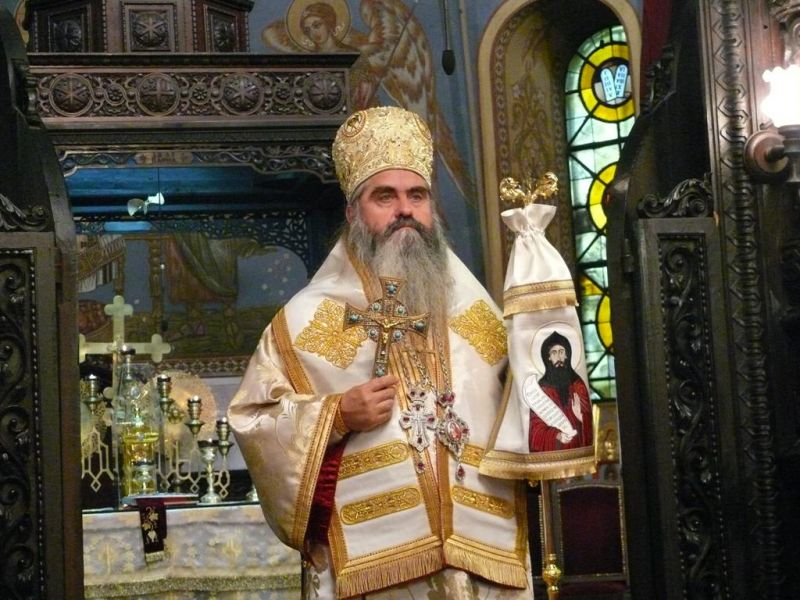
Kiril of Varna

Metropolitan Kiril (Bulgarian: Митрополит Кирил Варненски и Великопреславски, secular name Bogomil Petrov Kovachev, Bulgarian: Богомил Петров Ковачев); June 8, 1954 – July 9, 2013), was the Bulgarian Orthodox metropolitan of Varna and Veliki Preslav, Bulgaria.

He was named metropolitan in 1988. He was interim patriarch until February 24, 2013, following the death of Bulgaria's Patriarch Maxim in 2012.

== Controversy ==
In January 2012, a historical commission reported that Kiril was one of 11 bishops who collaborated with the old Communist secret police, providing information of use in repressing dissent from 1976 until the 1989 fall of the Communist regime.

== Death ==
On July 9, 2013, Kiril was found dead on a Black Sea beach near his Varna residence. Bulgarian police were first considering the possibility of violent death, though an autopsy later showed he had drowned and there were no signs of violence.
