= Miryana Basheva =

Bulgarian poet (1947–2020)

Miryana Ivanova Basheva (Bulgarian: Миряна Иванова Башева; 11 February 1947 – 12 July 2020) was a Bulgarian poet born in Sofia. She graduated from the University of Sofia in 1972.

Her poetry was included in the film The Hedgehog's War.

== Works ==
- Tezhuk Kharakter (Difficult Personality) 1976
- Malka zimna muzika (A small winter music) Vratsa: V. Aleksandrov, Sofiia: Bulgarski pisatel, 1979
- Sto godina sueta (A hundred years of folly) 1992

=== Anthologies ===
- Emery Edward George, ed. (1993). Contemporary East European poetry: an anthology. Oxford University Press. ISBN 978-0-19-508636-2.
