= Klisurski Monastery =

Coordinates: 43°10′56″N 023°12′16″E

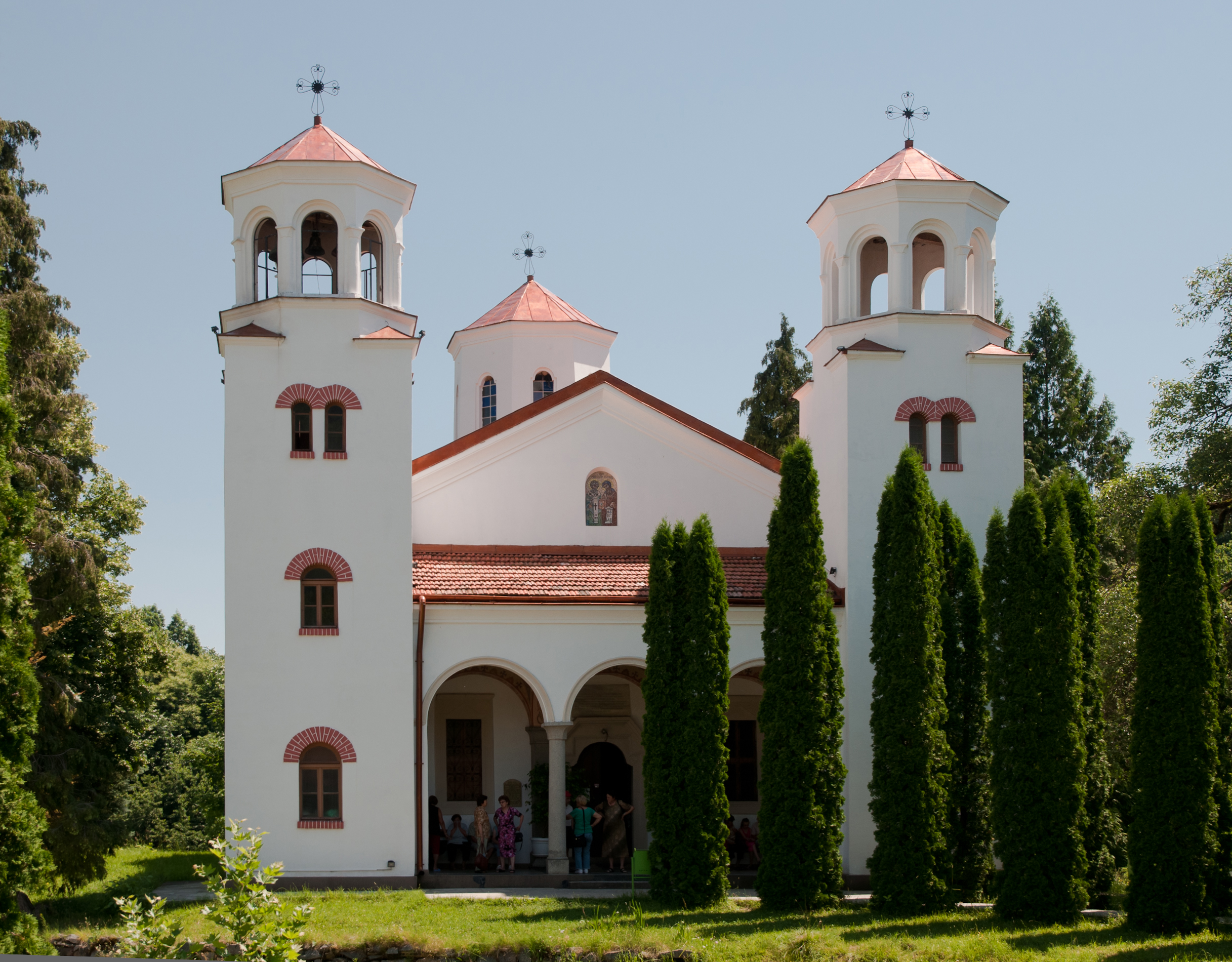
Saints Cyril and Methodius Katholikon - the main church in the monastery.

Klisurski Monastery (Bulgarian: Клисурски манастир, transliterated: Klisurski manastir) of "St. Cyril and St. Methodius," also known as Klisura Monastery, is a monastery of the Bulgarian Orthodox Church located in northwestern Bulgaria. It is the fourth largest monastery in Bulgaria. The complex includes two churches, three residential buildings, a farmyard and a kitchen.

== Location ==
Klisurski Monastery has the status of a separate settlement in the Varshets Municipality of the Montana Province. It is situated at the foot of the northern slopes of Todorini Kukla peak in the western Balkan Mountains. Nearby is the village of Tsvetkova bara (between the towns of Berkovitsa and Varshets). The monastery is 9 kilometres (5.6 mi) from Berkovitsa and 85 kilometres (53 mi) from Sofia.

== History ==
Klisurski Monastery was founded in the 1240 during the Second Bulgarian Empire. It was repeatedly destroyed during the Ottoman rule. In 1862 it was burned down and the monks and pilgrims were killed by a Turkish pasha and his soldiers. The monastery was reconstructed in 1869 and the church was officially consecrated in 1891.

== Gallery ==
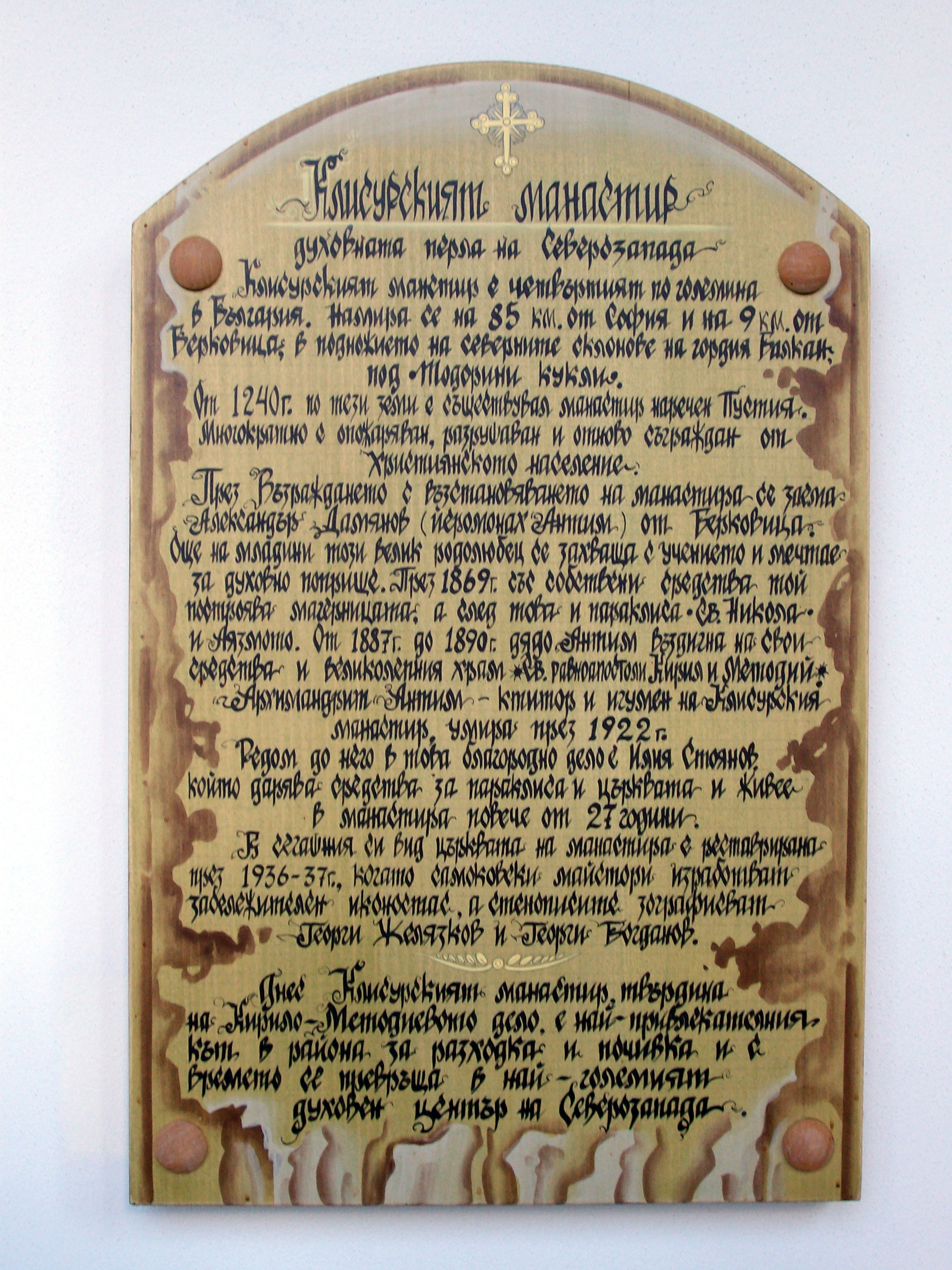

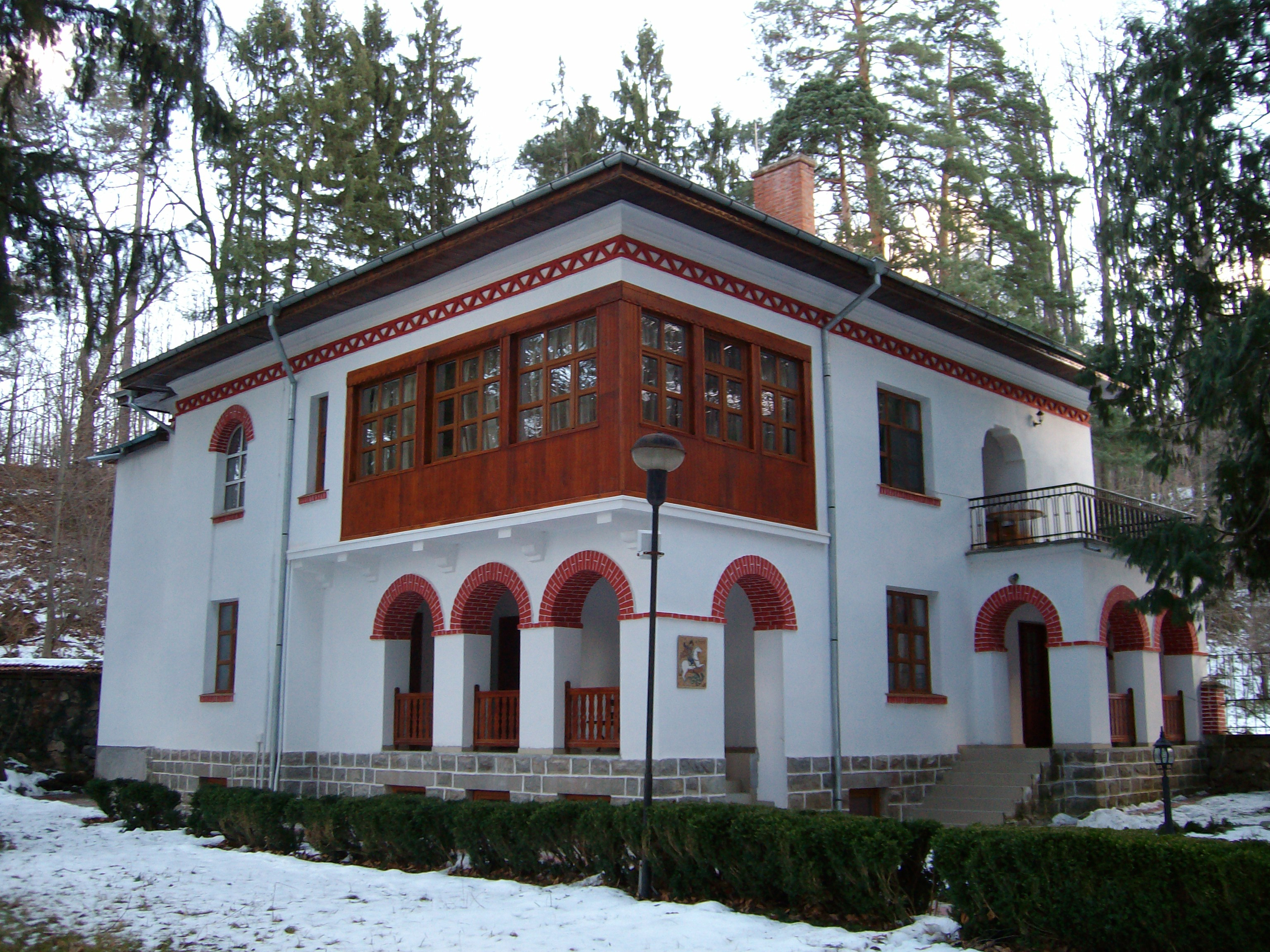

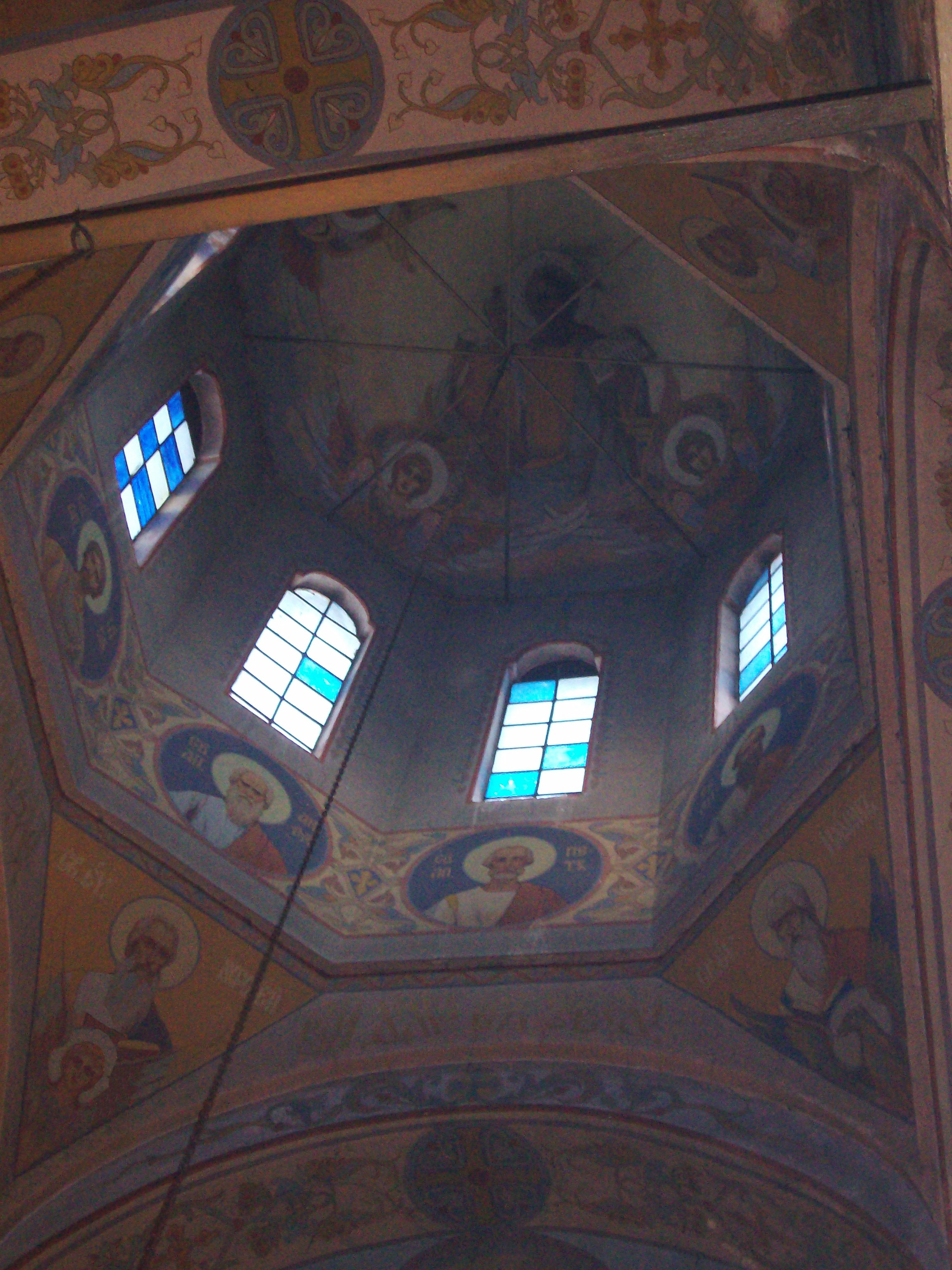

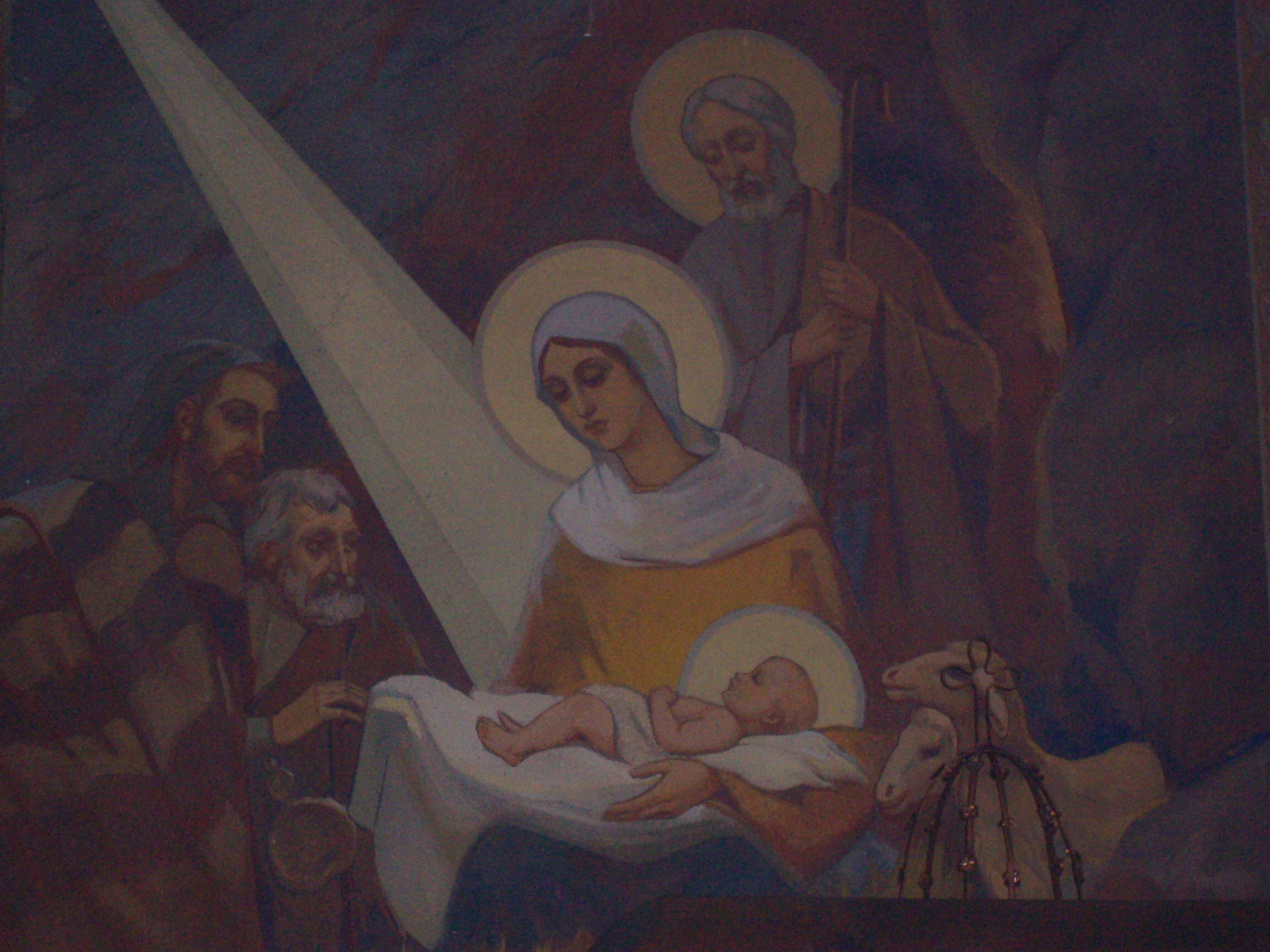

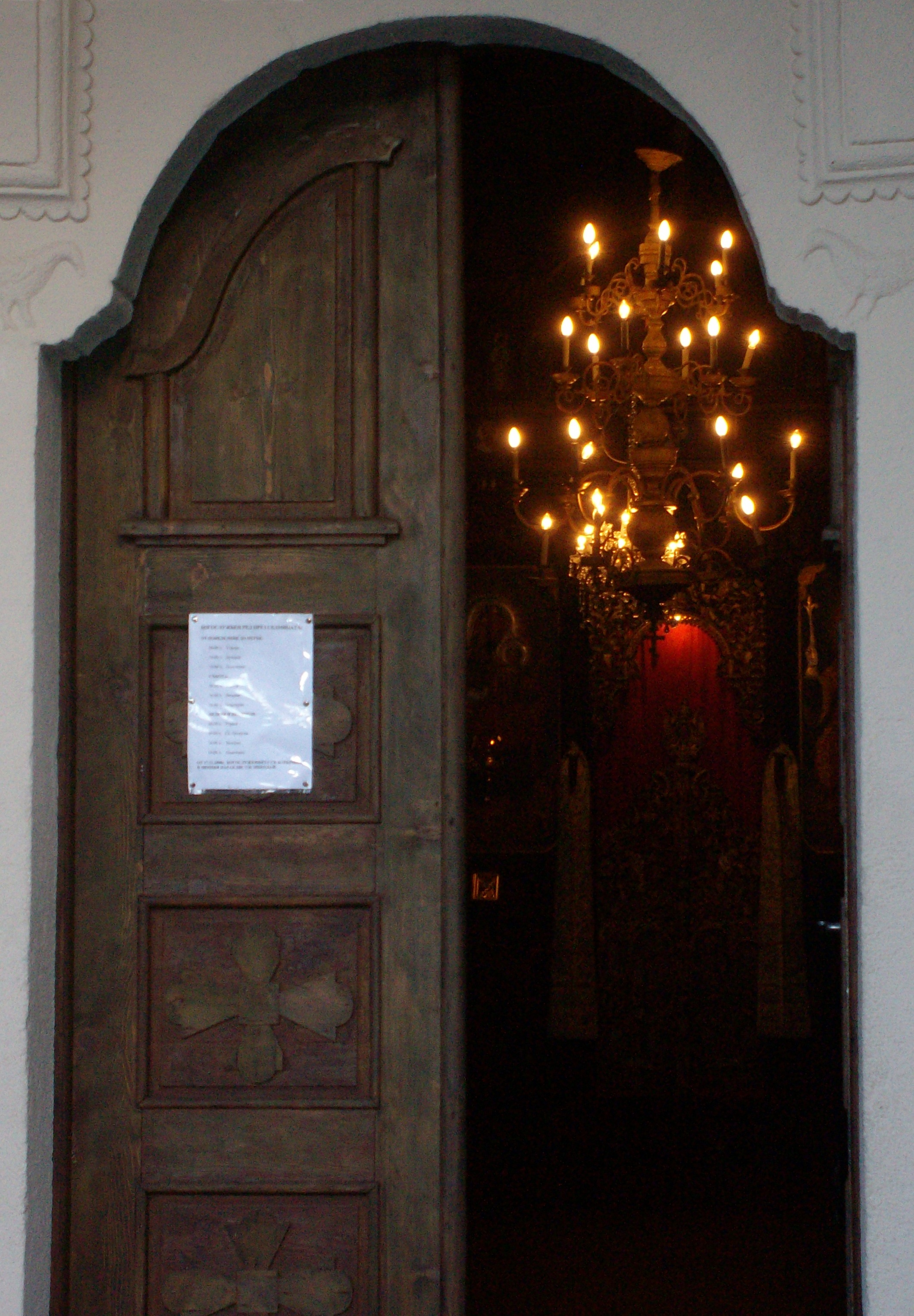

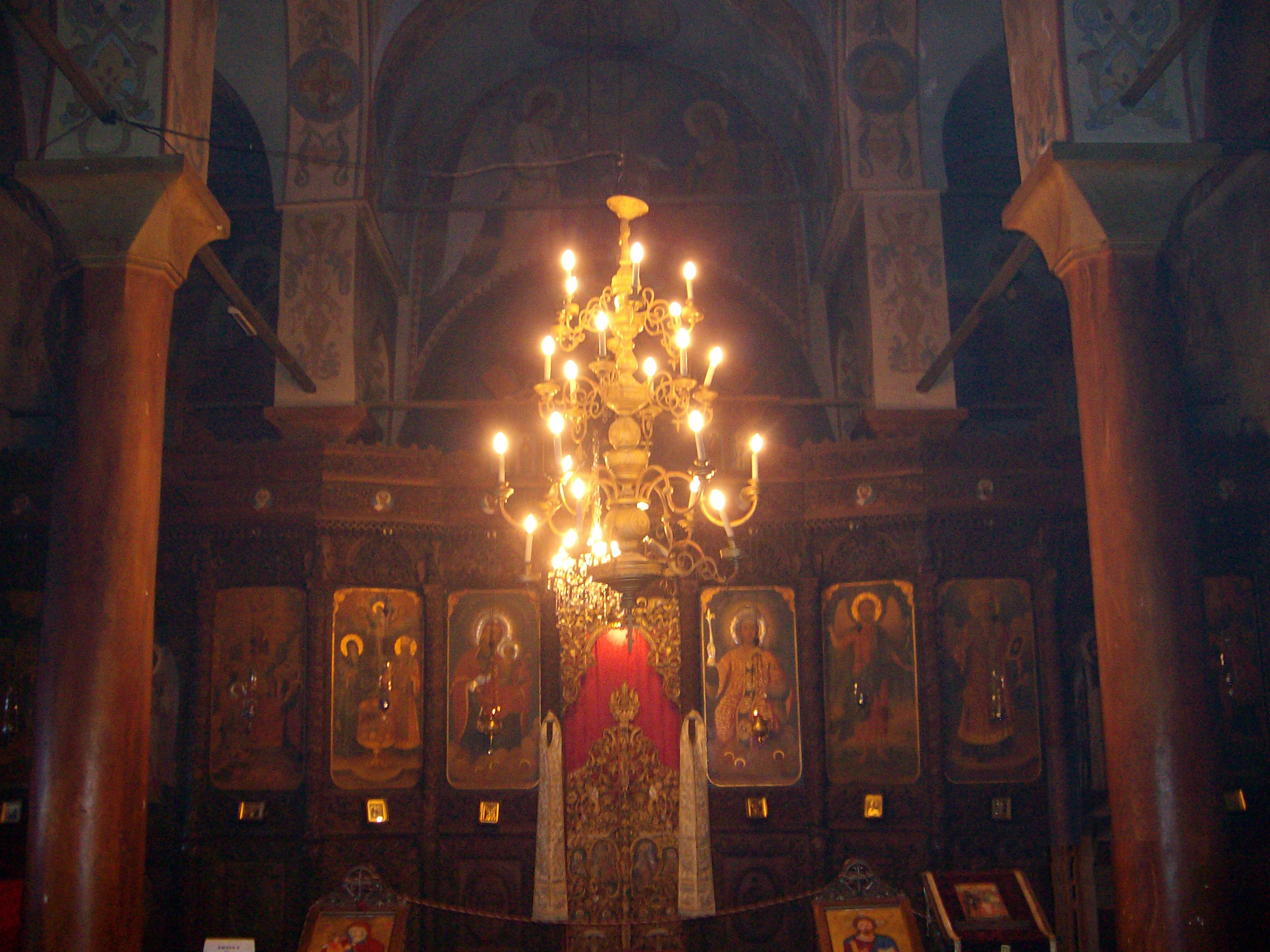

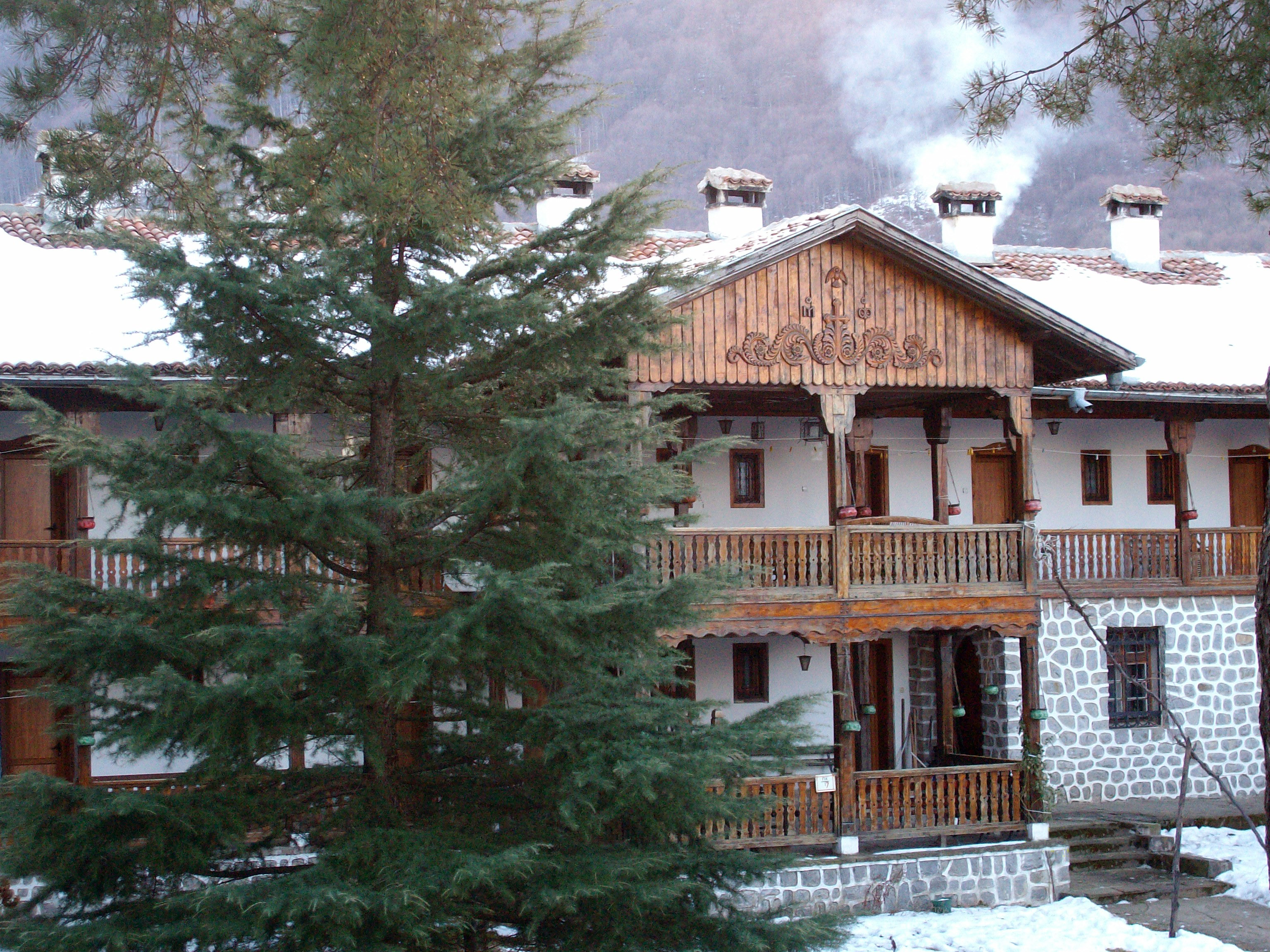

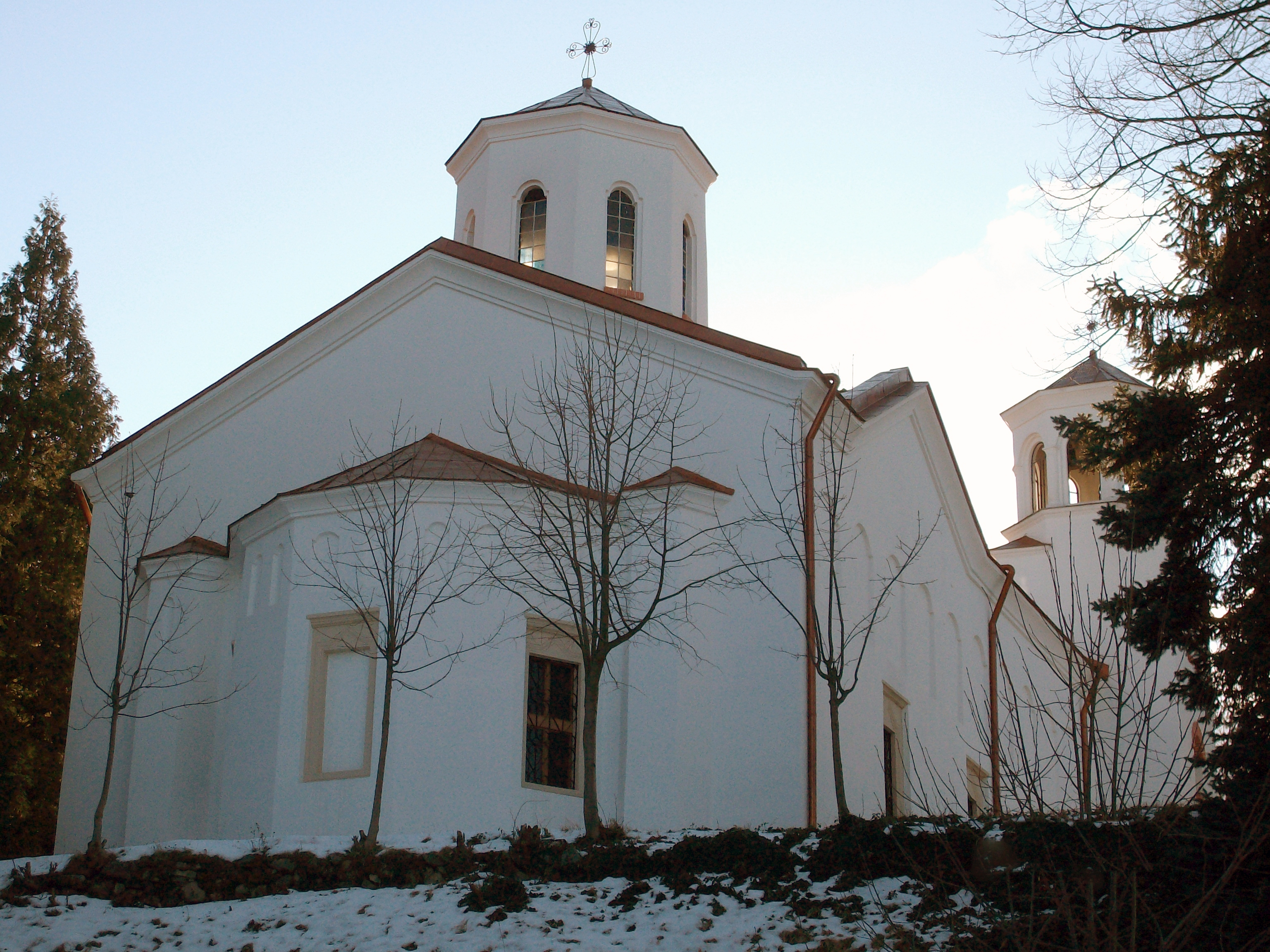

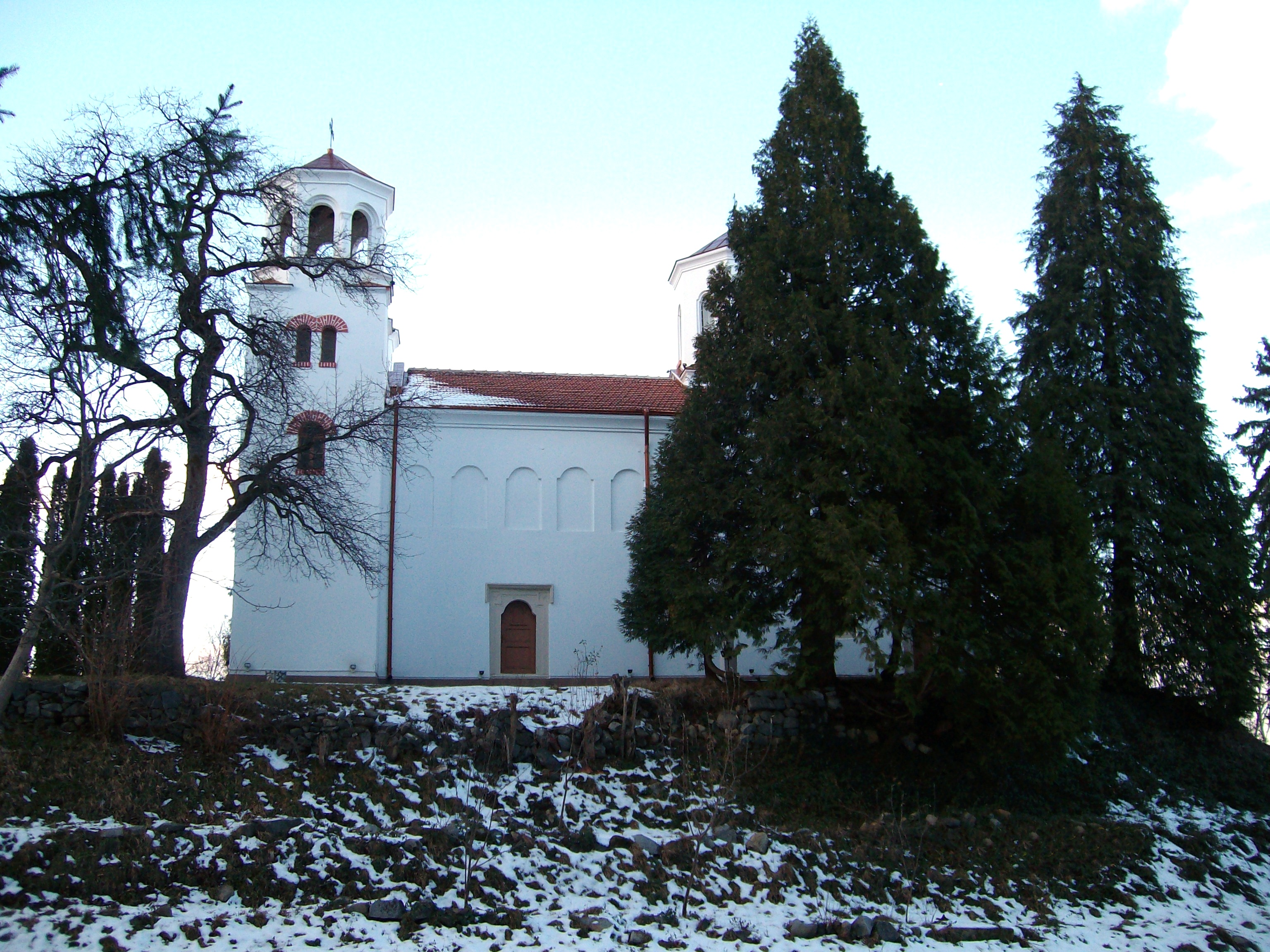

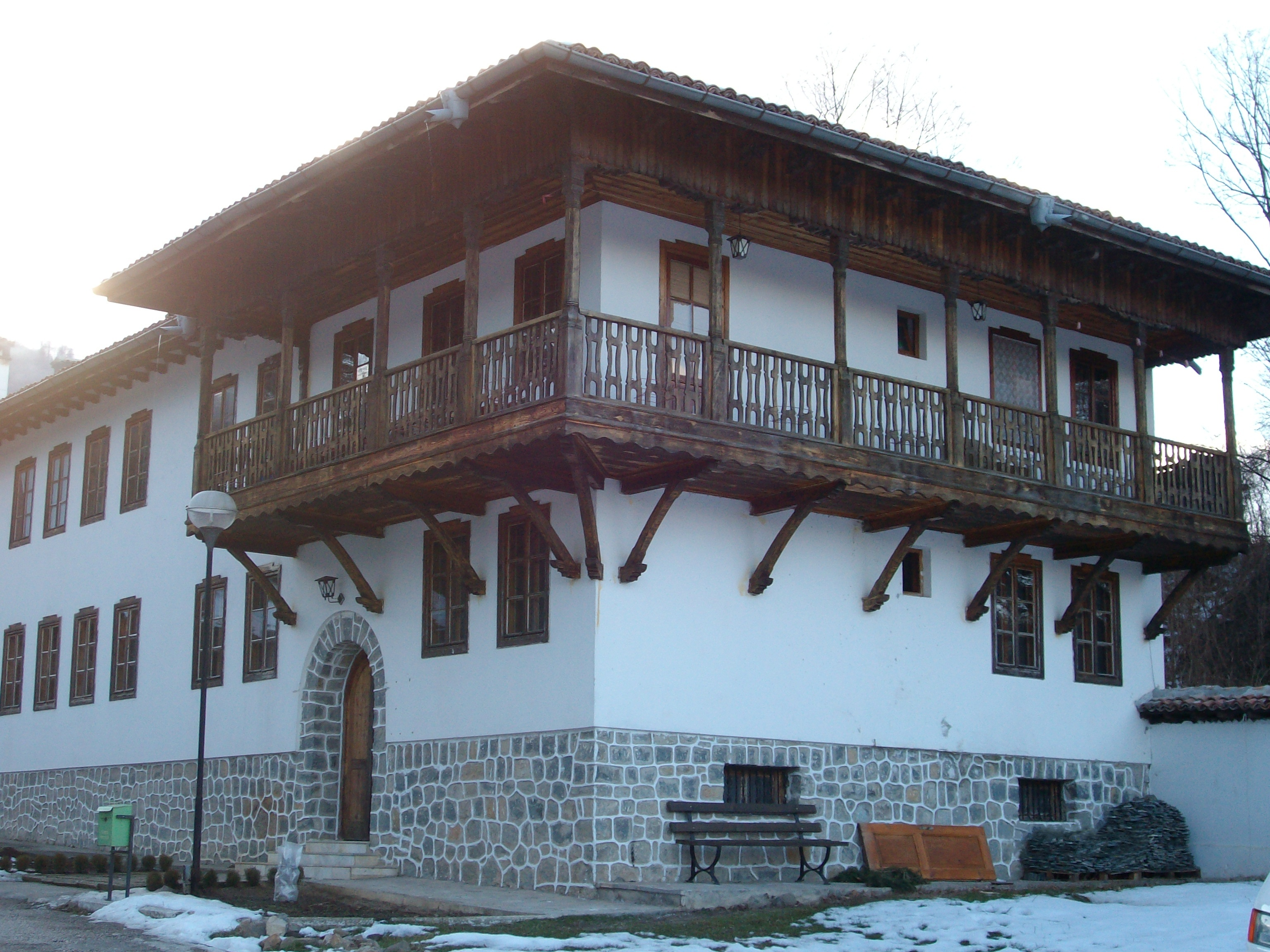

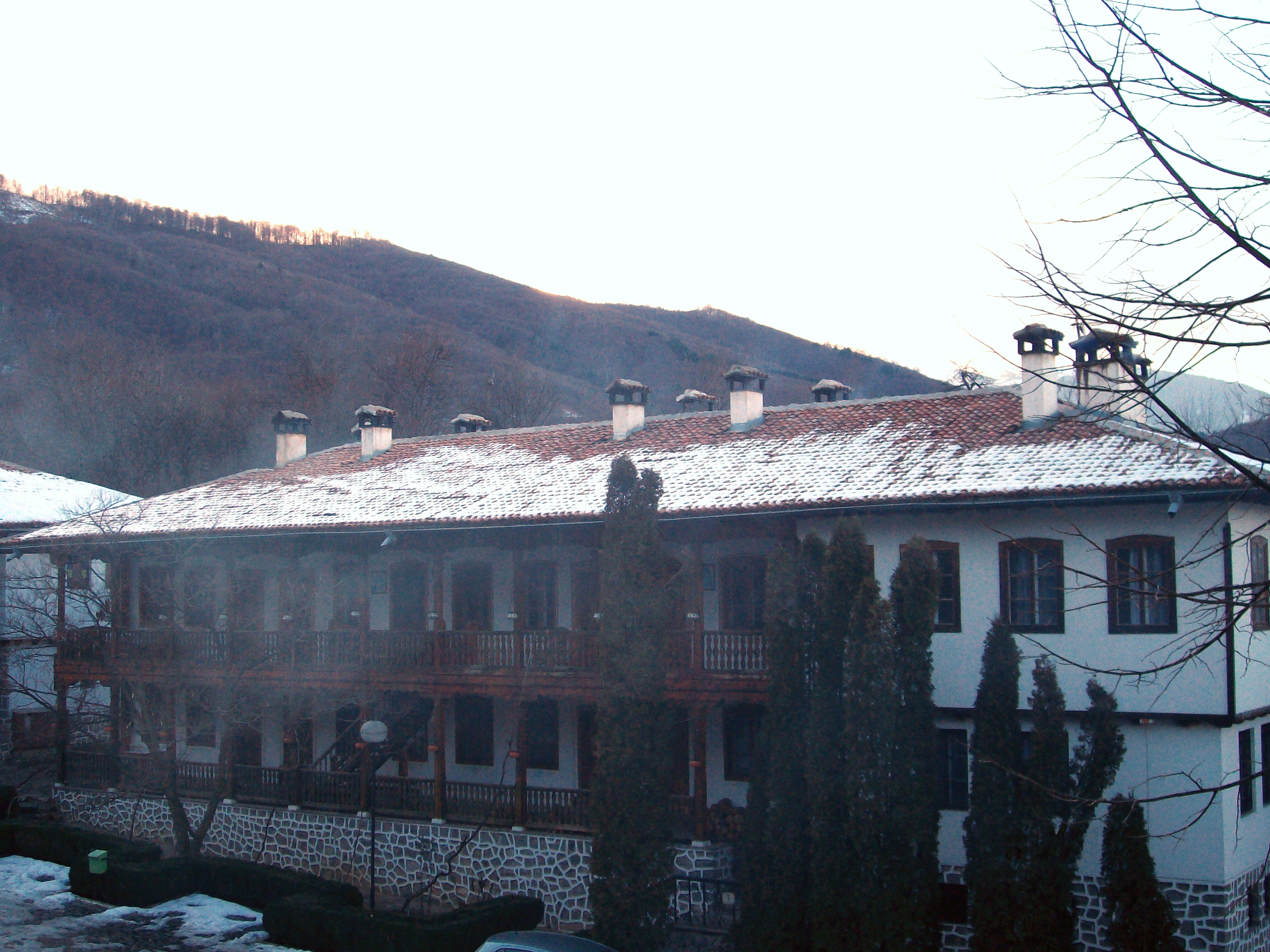

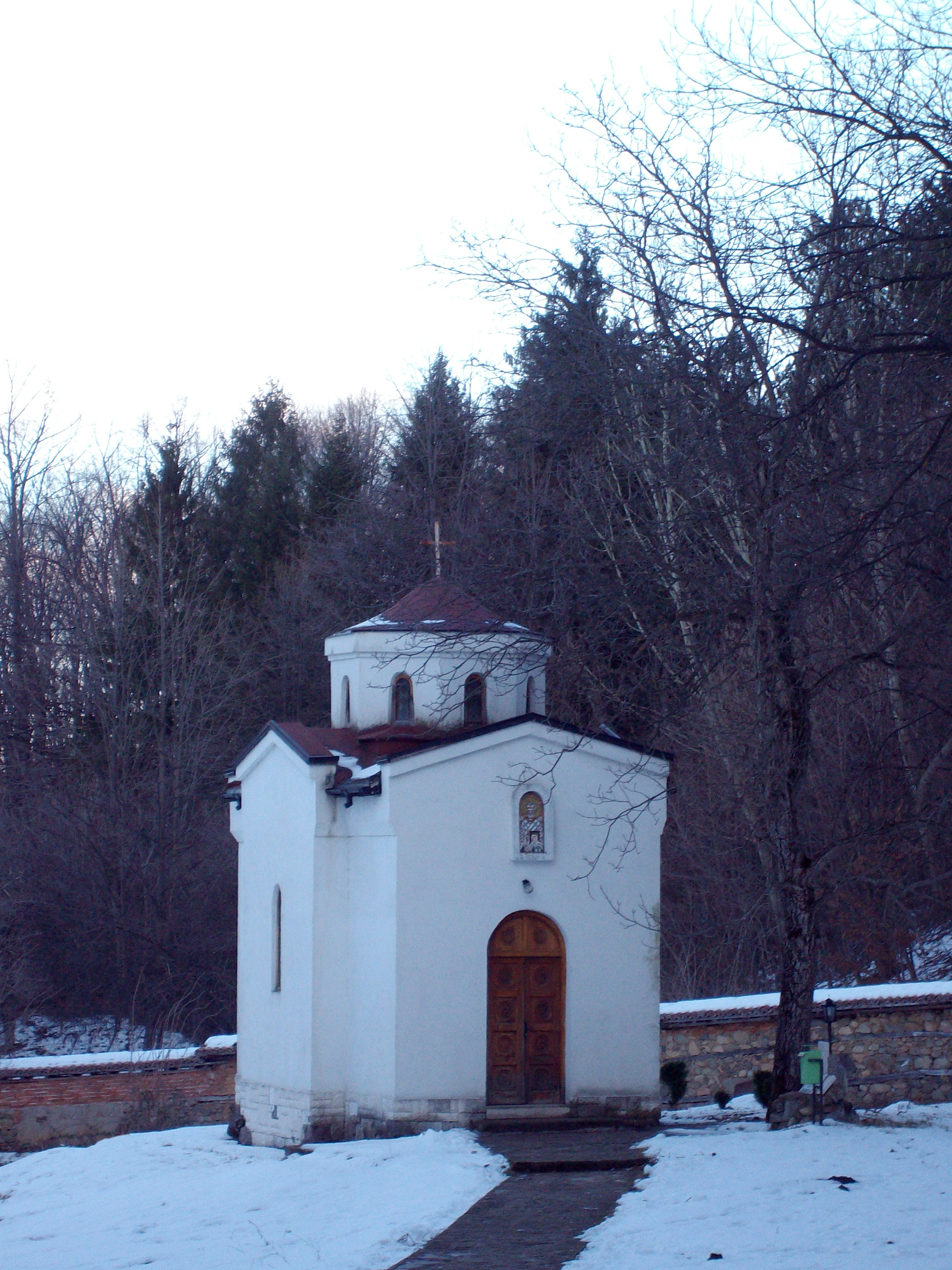
