= Silva Zurleva =

Bulgarian journalist (1958–2020)

Silva Nikolova Zurleva
- Born: Силва Николова Зурлева; 26 February 1958; Kyustendil, People's Republic of Bulgaria
- Died: 1 January 2020 (aged 61); Kovachevitsa, Bulgaria
- Occupation: Journalist

Silva Nikolova Zurleva (26 February 1958 – 1 January 2020) was a Bulgarian journalist.

== Life ==
Born on 26 February 1958 in Kyustendil, she graduated with a gold medal from the Sofia University, majoring in Bulgarian philology and Modern Greek language and literature. A PhD thesis on "The Sea in Contemporary Greek Poetry" begins. In the 1980s she translated fiction from Greek, wrote reviews of newly-published books by Balkan authors. She worked as an editor on the Bulgarian National Television and Sofia Press.

In 1992, Zurleva started working in the consulting business – foreign investment and privatization deals. Works on projects of Delta, Nikas, Goodis, Coca-Cola, Pleven Cement and others. Her message was "Delta – the tip of the ice cream." First in Sofia and then in other cities. "

Since 10 May 1999 she was the manager of the Antena Bulgaria media group, and since March 2001 – the chairman of Nova Television's board of directors, and since 2009 she was the chief television consultant and a member of the Board of Nova Broadcasting.

Zurleva died at her home on 1 January 2020 after falling down the stairs.
