= Stefan Vodenicharov =

Bulgarian academic (1944–2020)

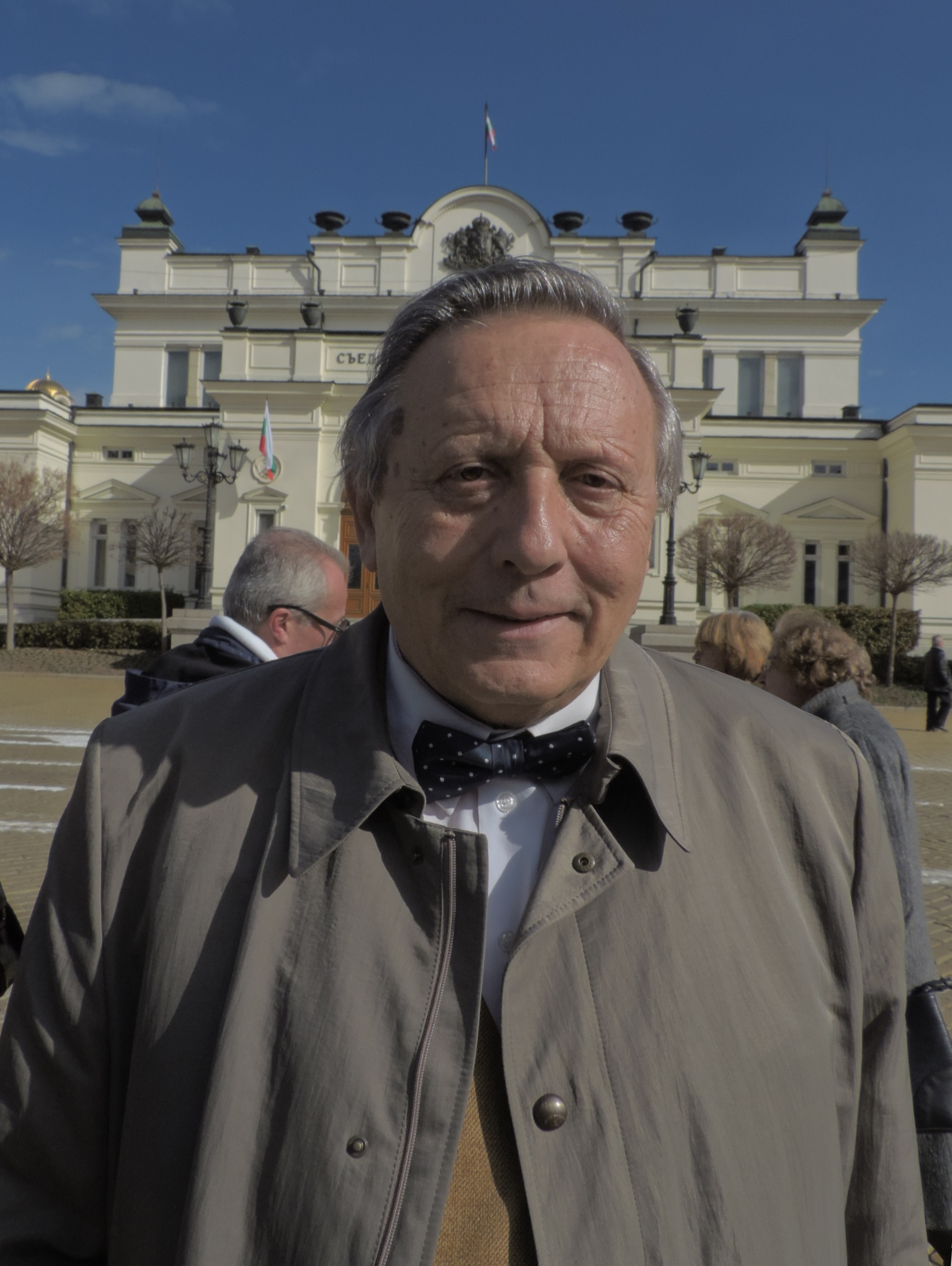

Minister of Education and Science
- In office 6 February 2013 – 13 March 2013
- Prime Minister: Boyko Borisov
- Preceded by: Sergei Ignatov
- Succeeded by: Nikolay Miloshev

Personal details
- Born: 1 September 1944 Sofia, Bulgaria
- Died: 8 June 2020 (aged 75) Sofia, Bulgaria
- Education: Technical University
- Occupation: Engineer, Academician

Stefan B. Vodenicharov (1 September 1944 – 8 June 2020) was president of the Bulgarian Academy of Sciences and Minister of Education, Youth and Science.

== Education and career ==
Vodenicharov was born on 1 September 1944, in Sofia. He graduated from the Technical University, Sofia with a degree in metal technology and then got his Ph.D. in 1974. In 1991 Vodenicharov became a professor and in 2004 became corresponding member of the Bulgarian Academy of Sciences (BAS). On 3 December 2012, following the death of Stefan Dodunekov, Vodenicharov was elected as BAS President. He also served as Deputy Director and Head of the Academician Angel Balevski Institute of Metal Science Equipment and Technologies with the Center for Hydro and Aerodynamics at BAS and a Member of the Managing Board of the Bulgarian Industrial Association. As President of the BAS, Vodenicharov had participated in a forum on innovation meeting, held at BAS between Bulgaria and Israel. He became Minister of Education, Youth and Science in the Cabinet of Boyko Borisov on 6 February 2013, succeeding Sergei Ignatov. The government fell shortly afterwards on 20 February 2013.

He died on 8 June 2020.
