= Mincho Yovchev =

Bulgarian politician (1942–2020)

Mincho Yovchev (27 February 1942 – 5 December 2020) was a Bulgarian politician who served as Minister of Industry and Deputy Prime Minister.
