= Kina Kadreva =

Bulgarian author (1931–2020)

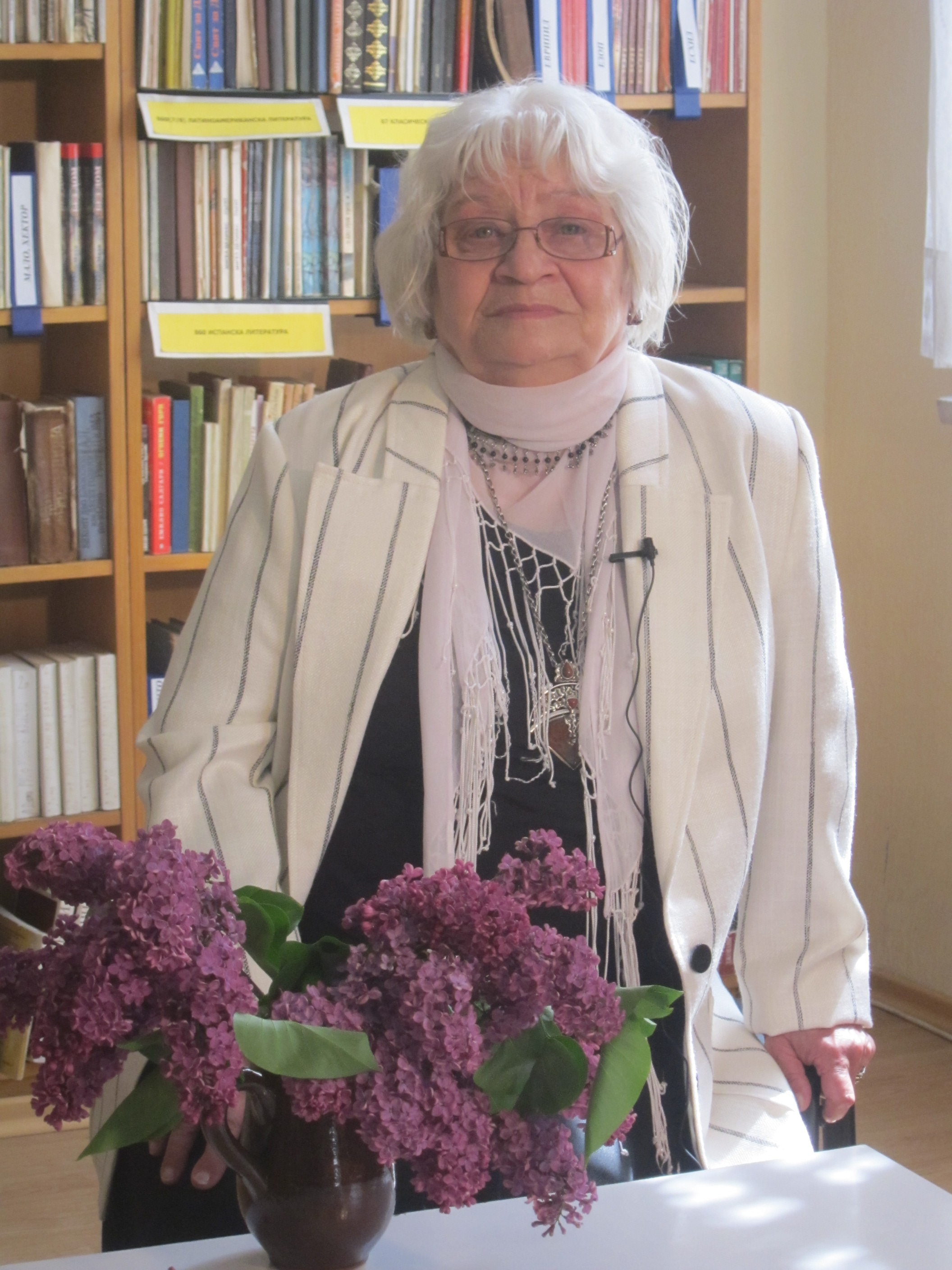
- Born: 27 September 1931; Burgas, Bulgaria
- Died: 27 July 2020 (aged 88)
- Occupation: author

Kina Kadreva (27 September 1931 – 27 July 2020) was a Bulgarian author. She is best known for the children's book "The Milk Tree" from 1962, and "Dragon under a down pillow" from 1996.
