= Economy of Bulgaria =

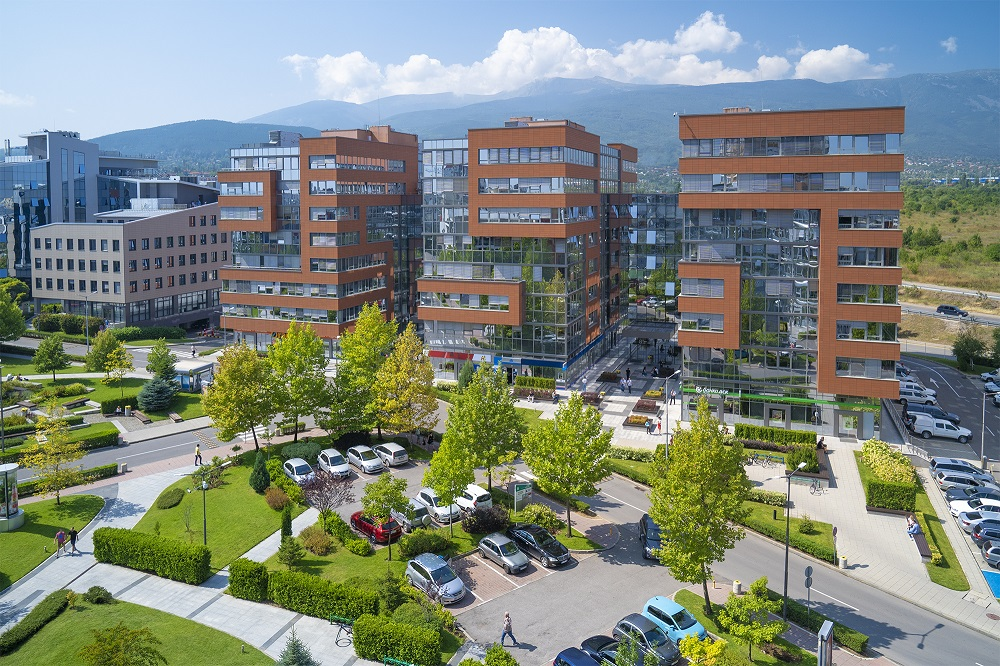
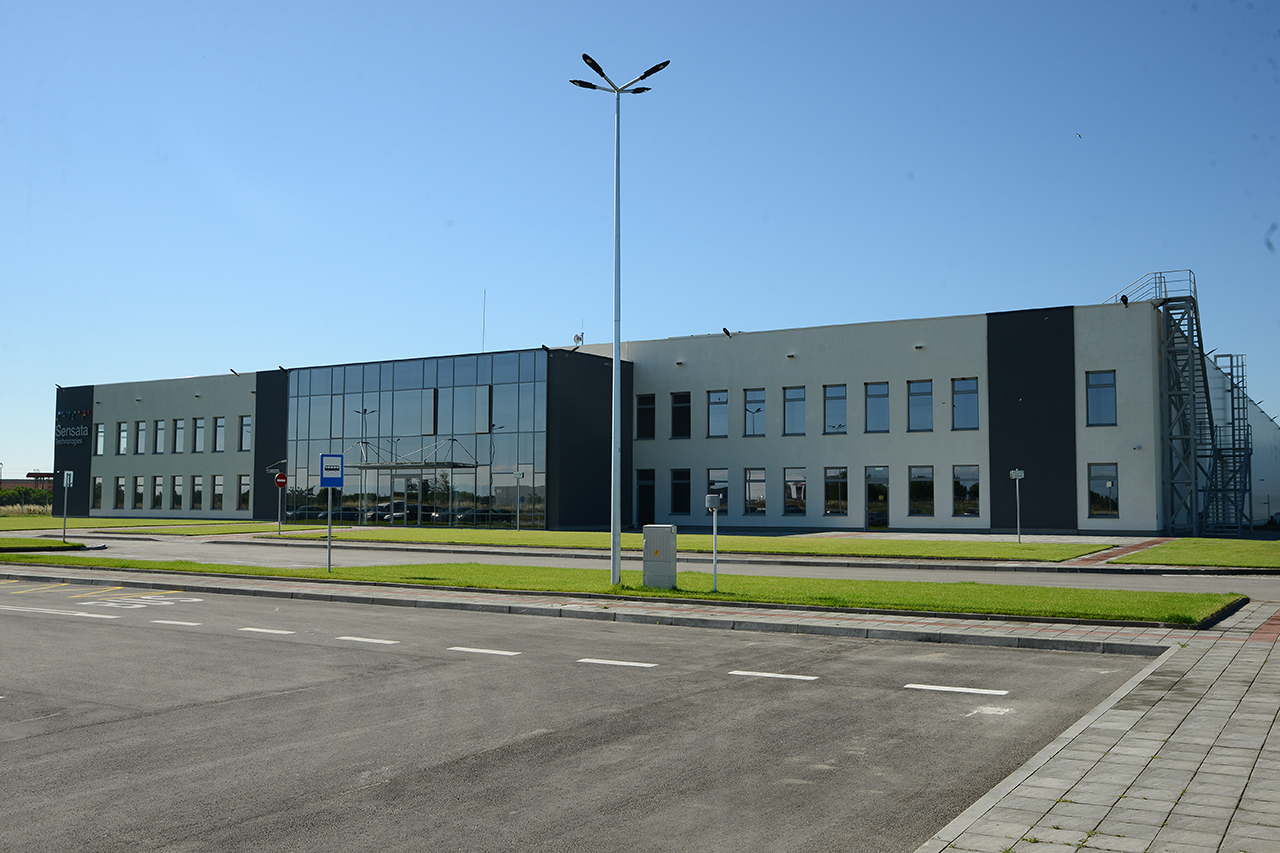
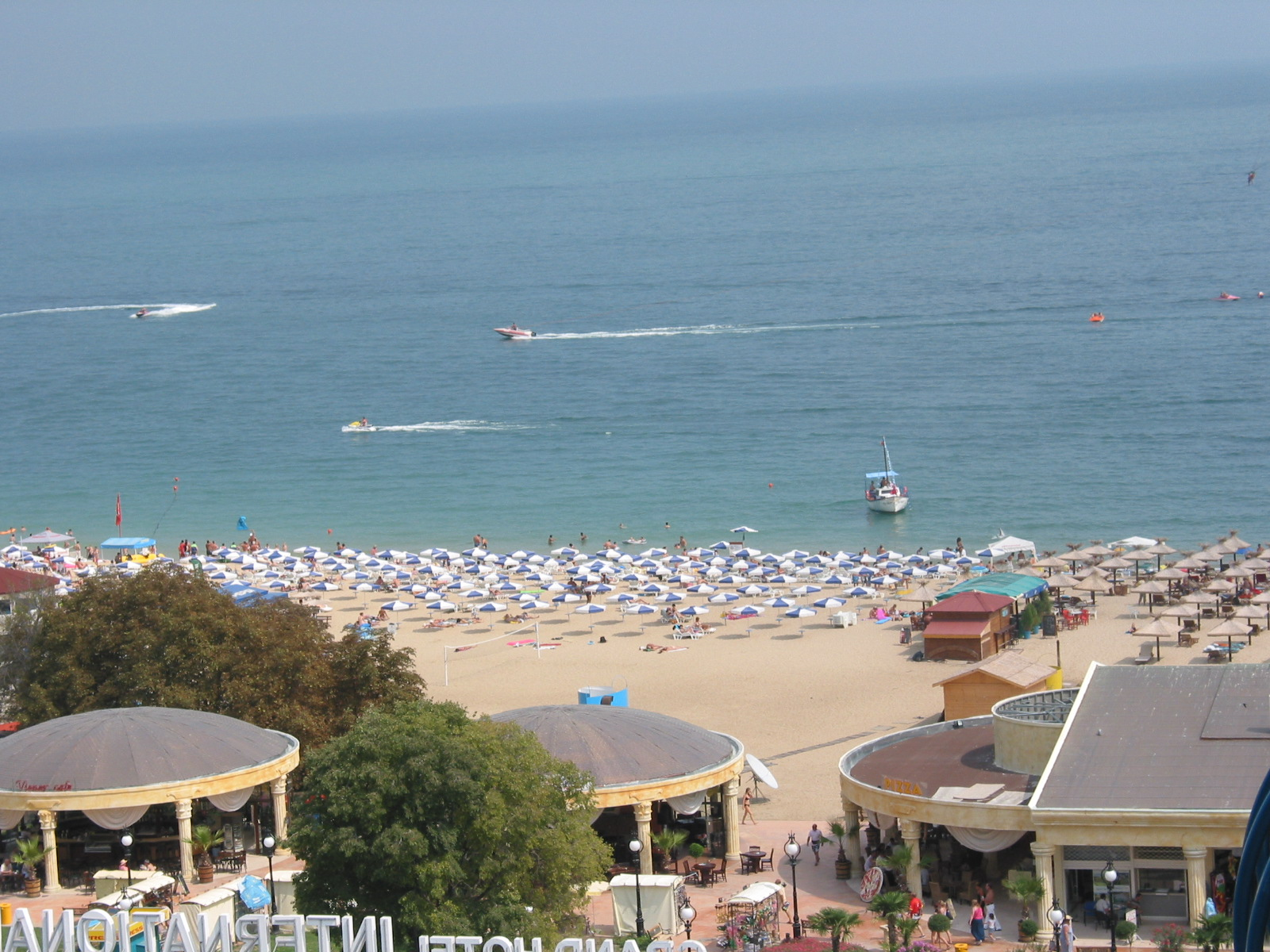
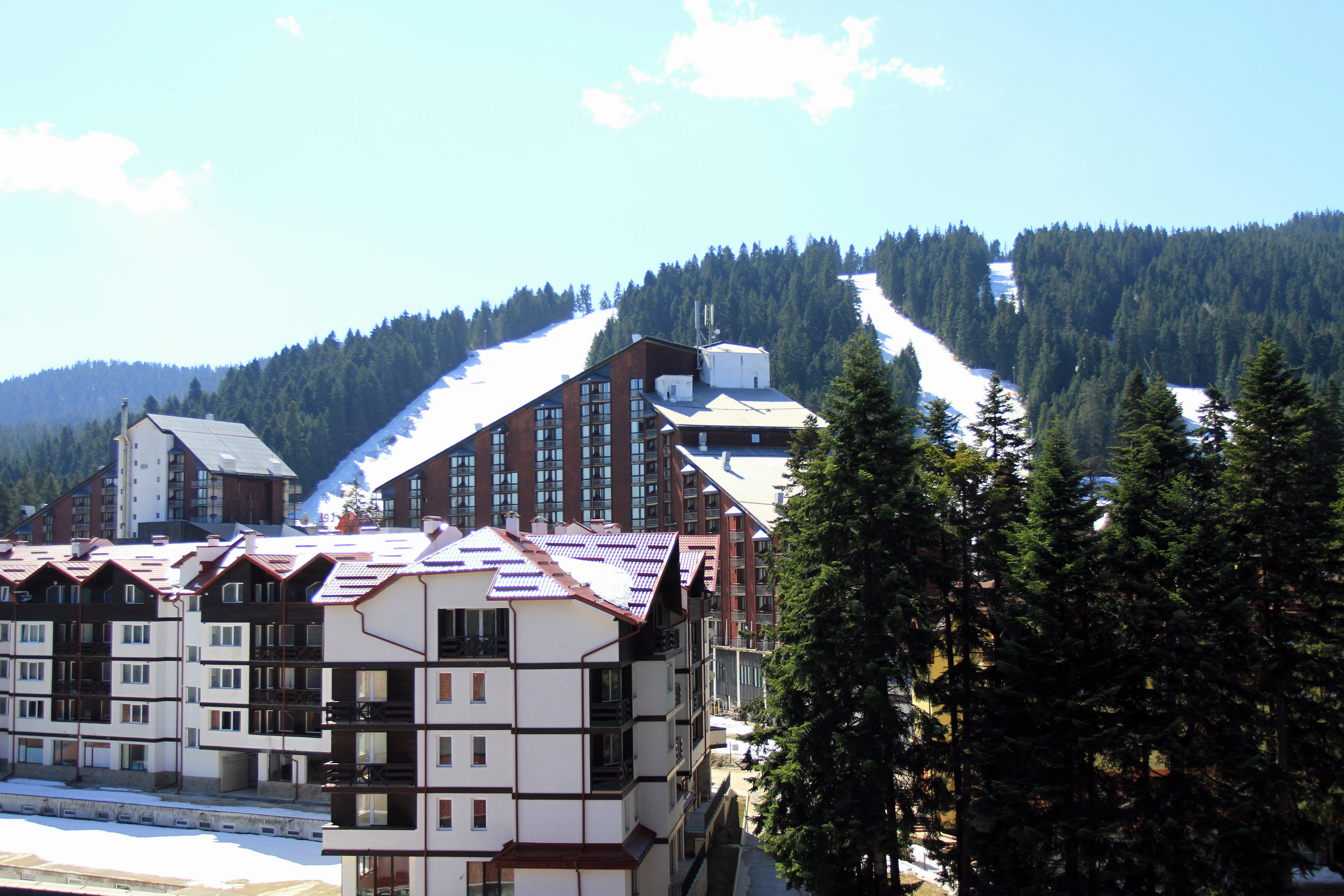
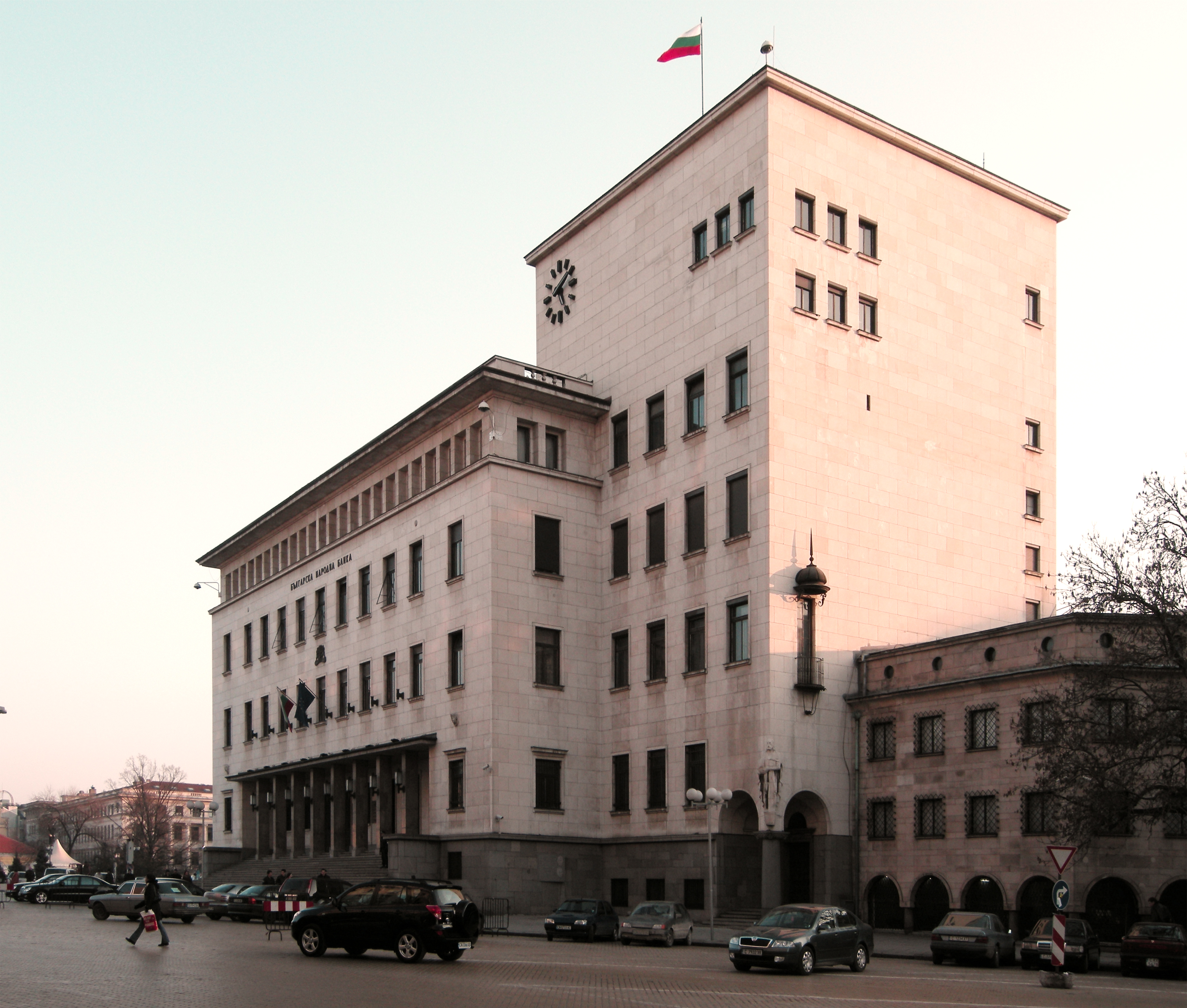
- Business Park Sofia Trakia Economic Zone Summer Tourism Resort Winter Tourism Resort Bulgarian National Bank From top to bottom, left to right: Business Park Sofia, Trakia Economic Zone, Tourism in Bulgaria, Bulgarian National Bank
- Currency: Euro (EUR, €)
- Fiscal year: Calendar year
- Trade organisations: EU, WTO and BSEC
- Country group: Advanced economy; High-income economy; Eurozone member

Statistics
- Population: ▼6,447,710 (2022)
- GDP: ▲$148.12 billion (nominal; 2026); ▲$283.48 billion (PPP; 2026)
- GDP rank: 68th (nominal; 2025); 73rd (PPP; 2025)
- GDP growth: 3.4% (2024); 3.1% (2025)
- GDP per capita: ▲$23,850 (nominal; 2026); ▲$45,640 (PPP; 2026)
- GDP per capita rank: 59th (nominal; 2025); 55th (PPP; 2025)
- GDP per capita growth: 3.2% (2025)
- GDP by sector: agriculture: 5.1%; industry: 27.5%; services: 67.4%; (2016)
- Inflation (CPI): 8.6% (2023); 2.8% (2024); 2.6% (2025)
- Population below national poverty line: 22.1% in poverty (2020); ▲30.3% at risk of poverty or social exclusion (AROPE 2024)
- Gini coefficient: ▲38.4 medium (2024)
- Human Development Index: ▲0.845 very high (2023) (55th); ▲0.748 high (52nd) IHDI (2023)
- Corruption Perceptions Index: ▼43 out of 100 points (2024) (76th)
- Labour force: 3,283,797 (2019); ▲76.2% employment rate (2023)
- Labour force by occupation: agriculture: 6.8%; industry: 26.6%; services: 66.6%; (2016 est.)
- Unemployment: 4.8% (January 2022); 9.2% youth unemployment (15 to 24 year-olds; 2022)
- Average gross salary: ▲€1,475 / $1,716 monthly (March 2026)
- Average net salary: ▲€1,145 / $1,475 monthly (March 2026)
- Main industries: electricity; tourism; construction; non-ferrous metal mining industry; food, beverages, tobacco; machinery and equipment, automotive parts; chemical products, petroleum refinement (fuels); logistics and transportation; IT sector and outsourcing providers for specialized services.

External
- Exports: ▼$50.6 billion (2023)
- Export goods: refined petroleum, petroleum gas, electricity, refined and raw copper, wheat, seed oils, sunflower seeds, precious metal ore, prep binder for foundry, packaged medicaments, motorcycles and cycles, automotive parts, copper plating, raw metals, scraps, telephones, semiconductor devices and computers, electrical equipment, baked goods
- Main export partners: EU; Germany 13.5%; Romania 11.1%; Italy 8.02%; Greece 6.01%; Poland 4.17%; Belgium 3.11%; France 3.07%; China 3.05%; Turkey 5.39%; United States 2.98%; (2023)
- Imports: ▼$52.6 billion (2023)
- Import goods: crude petroleum, petroleum gas, copper ore, cars and automotive parts, tractors, prepr binder for foundry, packaged medicaments, refined petroleum, telephones, semiconductor devices and computers, sunflower seeds, seed oils, raw and refined metals, foods, clothes
- Main import partners: EU; Germany 11.6%; Romania 7.68%; Italy 6.00%; Greece 4.53%; Netherlands 3.91%; Poland 3.79%; Hungary 3.51%; Turkey 8.46%; Russia 6.67%; China 5.67%; (2023)
- FDI stock: $46.92 billion (2017); Abroad: $5.868 billion (2017)
- Current account: $2.562 billion (2017)
- Gross external debt: $42.06 billion (2017)

Public finance
- Government debt: 23.1% of GDP (2023); BGN 42 billion (2023)
- Foreign reserves: $35,395 billion (2024)
- Budget balance: BGN 3.5 billion deficit (2023); −1,9% of GDP (2023)
- Revenue: 37.9% of GDP (2023)
- Spending: 39.8% of GDP (2023)
- Economic aid: €6.9 billion from European Structural and Investment Funds (2007–2013); €9.88 billion from European Structural and Investment Funds (2014–2020)
- Credit rating: S&P: BBB+ (Long Term); A-2 (Short Term); Outlook: Positive (2026); Fitch: BBB+; Outlook: Stable (2025); Moody's: Baa1; Outlook: Stable (2025); Scope: A-; Outlook: Stable (2025); DBRS: BBB (high); Outlook: Stable (2025)
- All values, unless otherwise stated, are in US dollars.

The economy of Bulgaria functions on the principles of the free market, having a large private sector and a smaller public one. Bulgaria has an advanced, high-income economy according to the International Monetary Fund and the World Bank. It is a member of the European Union (EU), the World Trade Organization (WTO) and the Organization of the Black Sea Economic Cooperation (BSEC). The Bulgarian economy has experienced significant growth (538%), starting from $13.15 billion (nominal, 2000) and reaching estimated gross domestic product (GDP) of $107 billion (nominal, 2024 est.) or $229 billion (PPP, 2024 est.), GDP per capita of $36,000 (PPP, 2024 est.), average gross monthly salary of 2,468 leva (1,262 euro) (December 2024), and average net monthly salary of $2,191 (adjusted for living costs in PPP) (Q2 2024). Until 2026, the national currency was the lev (plural leva), pegged to the euro at 1.95583 leva for 1 euro. The lev was one of the strongest and most stable currencies in Eastern Europe. On 1 January 2026, Bulgaria adopted the euro and became a member of the Eurozone.

Video summary (script)

The strongest sectors in the economy are energy, mining, metallurgy, machine building, agriculture and tourism. Primary industrial exports are clothing, iron and steel, machinery and refined fuels.

Sofia is the capital and economic heart of Bulgaria and home to most major Bulgarian and international companies operating in the country, as well as the Bulgarian National Bank and the Bulgarian Stock Exchange. Varna is the third largest city in Bulgaria and the largest city on the Black Sea in Bulgaria.

The Bulgarian economy has developed significantly in the last 26 years, despite difficulties following the disbandment of Comecon in 1991. In the early 1990s, the country's slow pace of privatization, contradictory government tax and investment policies, and bureaucratic red tape kept foreign direct investment (FDI) among the lowest in the region. Total FDI from 1991 through 1996 was $831 million.

In December 1996, Bulgaria joined the World Trade Organization. In the years since 1997, Bulgaria has begun to attract substantial foreign investment. In 2004 alone, over 2.72 billion euro ($3.47 billion) were invested by foreign companies. In 2005, economists observed a slowdown to about 1.8 billion euro ($2.3 billion) in FDI, which is attributed mainly to the end of the privatization of the major state-owned companies.

After joining the European Union in 2007, Bulgaria registered a peak in foreign investment of about 6 billion euro. Low productivity and competitiveness on the European and world markets alike due to inadequate R&D funding, however, still remain a significant obstacle to foreign investment. Nevertheless, according to the latest Annual report of the Economic Research Institute at the Bulgarian Academy of Sciences, the average salary in Bulgaria is a quarter (1/4) of the average salary in the European Union, and should be two times higher when labour productivity is factored into the formula.

During the Great Recession, Bulgaria saw its economy decline by 5.5% in 2009, but quickly restored positive growth levels to 0.2% in 2010, in contrast to other Balkan countries. However, growth remained weak in the following years, and GDP only reached pre-crisis levels in 2014.

== History ==
During the 17th and 18th century Bulgaria had a largely undeveloped industry with agriculture, crafts, and partly trade being the only developed industry sectors.

Bulgaria was one of the more dynamic industrial areas of the Ottoman Empire. Bulgaria experienced an economic boom in export-oriented textiles in the period 1815–65, even while the Ottoman Empire's economy was declining. Bulgaria had comparatively weak economic growth from the 1870s to World War I. The Bulgarian export sector collapsed after Bulgarian independence in 1878. By 1903, industrial output in Bulgaria was far lower than in 1870.

Interwar Bulgaria was characterized by extensive government intervention in the economy. During the period 1921–1925, approximately 100,000 Bulgarians were forced into a system of compulsory labor where they worked for the government on public works for eight months without pay.

During the 1930s, the Bulgarian economy was described as an economy militarily bound to Germany. In the early 1940s, as Germany began to lose the Second World War, the Bulgarian economy suffered a decline.

In the interwar period, there was considerable economic modernization in Bulgaria's agricultural sector, setting the conditions for rapid growth after World War II.

=== Cold War period ===
During the Socialism era, Bulgarian economy continued to be industrialized, although free market trade substantially decreased, as private market initiatives became state-regulated. Still, the Bulgarian economy made significant overall progress in modernizing road infrastructure, airline transportation, as well as developing the tourism sector by building tourist resorts along the Black Sea coast and the mountain regions.

From the end of World War II until the widespread change of regime in Eastern Europe in November 1989, the Bulgarian Communist Party (BCP) exerted complete economic, social and political control in Bulgaria. The party's ascent to power in 1944 had marked the beginning of economic change towards planned economy. During that time, Bulgaria followed the Soviet model of economic development more closely than any other member of the Eastern Bloc, while becoming one of the first members of Comecon. The new regime shifted the economy type from a predominantly agrarian one towards an industrial economy, while encouraging the relocation of the labour force from the countryside to the cities, thus providing workers for the newly built large-scale industrial complexes. At the same time, the focus of Bulgarian international trade shifted from Central Europe to Eastern Europe and the USSR.

These new policies resulted in impressive initial rates of economic development. Bulgarian economy closely resembled that of the Soviet Union. Soviet-style centralised planning formed by consecutive five-year plan periods had more immediate benefits there compared to the other Eastern European states where it was first applied in the early 1950s. By the mid-1950s, living standards rose significantly, and in 1957 collective farm workers benefited from the first agricultural pension and welfare system in Eastern Europe. Bulgaria underwent rapid industrial development from the 1950s onwards. Starting with the 1960s, the country's economy appeared profoundly transformed. Throughout the postwar period, economic progress was also substantially assisted by a level of internal political stability unseen in other Eastern European countries during the same period. That represented a change on the Bulgarian political scene, as political turbulence was common before BCP's ascent to power.

Bulgaria was involved in computer construction, which earned it the nickname "Silicon Valley of the Eastern Bloc." Bulgarian engineers developed the first Bulgarian computer, the Vitosha, as well as the Pravetz computers.

Nonetheless, beginning in the early 1970s, low capital and labour productivity, as well as expensive material inputs, plagued the Bulgarian economy. With disappointing rates of growth came a high degree of economic experimentation. This experimentation took place within the socialist economic framework, although never approaching a market-based economy. In the late 1980s, continuing poor economic performance intensified economic hardship. By that time, the misdirection and irrationality of BCP economic policies had become quite clear. Bulgaria's economy contracted dramatically after 1989, shortly before Comecon, with which the Bulgarian economy had integrated closely, dissolved in 1991. On 10 November 1989, at the November plenum of BCP, Todor Zhivkov was dismissed from his long-held party leader and head of state positions. The communist regime gave way to democratic elections and government. Unlike the communist parties in most other Eastern European states, the BCP (changing its name to Bulgarian Socialist Party) retained power by winning the first free national elections in June 1990. That was made possible by changes in party leadership, programme, reduction of its power base and other moves which permitted economic re-orientation toward a market system. This difficult transition combined with political vagueness and unpreparedness of the Bulgarian people for social and economic changes led to dramatically worsening economic conditions during the early 1990s.

=== 1990–2000 ===
Economic performance declined dramatically at the beginning of the 1990s after the disbandment of the Comecon system and the loss of the Soviet and Comecon market, to which the country had been entirely tied. Also, as a result of political unrest with the first attempts to re-establish a democratic political system and free market economy the standard of living fell by about 40%, and only started to stabilize significantly after 1998 after the fall of Jean Videnov's socialist government. It regained pre-1989 levels by June 2004.

First signs of recovery showed in 1994 when GDP grew by 1.4%. This progress continued with a 2.5% rise in 1995. Inflation, which surged to 122% in 1994, fell to normal rates of 32.9% in 1995. During 1996, however, the economy collapsed during Jean Videnov's government. That was due to the Bulgarian Socialist Party's inability to introduce vital economic reforms and failure to set legislative standards for banking and financial institutions, thus forcing an unstable banking system. All this led to an inflation rate of 311%, and the collapse of the lev. In the spring 1997, the pro-reform United Democratic Forces coalition came to power with its ambitious economic reform package. The reforms included introduction of a currency board regime, which was agreed to with the International Monetary Fund and the World Bank, and allowed the economy to stabilize. The 2000s saw a steady pace of growth and budget surpluses, but shaky inflation.

Successful foreign direct investment and successive governments have demonstrated a commitment to economic reforms and responsible fiscal planning that have contributed greatly to the Bulgarian economy, with a historical growth rate average of 6% a year. Corruption in the public administration and a weak judiciary have continued to be long-term problems, with presence of organized crime remaining very high.

Although politicians were giving warranties that the late-2000s recession would not hit Bulgaria, the economy suffered a 5.5% GDP decline in that period. Unemployment rose for at least five-quarters bringing Bulgaria's worst recession since the early 1990s. Still, economic circumstances were not too severe when compared to the rest of Europe. Future prospects are tied to the country's increasingly important integration with the European Union member states.

=== Reforms of the 1990s and early 2000s ===
Members of the government promised to move forward on cash and mass privatization upon taking office in January 1995 but were slow to act. United Nations sanctions against Yugoslavia and Iraq (1990–2003), two of the country's most significant trading partners, took a heavy toll on the Bulgarian economy. The first signs of recovery emerged in 1994 when the GDP grew and inflation fell. The first round of mass privatisation finally began in January 1996, and auctions began toward the end of that year. The second and third rounds were conducted in Spring 1997 under a new government. In July 1998, the UDF-led government and the IMF reached an agreement on a 3-year loan worth about $800 million, which replaced the 14-month stand-by agreement that expired in June 1998. The loan was used to develop financial markets, improve social safety net programmes, strengthen the tax system, reform agricultural and energy sectors, and further liberalise trade. The European Commission, in its 2002 country report, recognised Bulgaria as a functioning market economy, acknowledging the progress made by Prime Minister Ivan Kostov's government toward market-oriented reforms.

=== Rebound from the February 1997 crisis ===
In April 1997, the Union of Democratic Forces (SDS) won pre-term parliamentary elections and introduced an IMF currency board system which succeeded in stabilizing the economy. The triple digit inflation of 1996 and 1997 has given way to an official economic growth, but forecasters predicted accelerated growth over the next several years. The government's structural reform program includes:

1. privatization and, where appropriate, liquidation of state-owned enterprises (SOEs);
2. liberalization of agricultural policies, including creating conditions for the development of a land market;
3. reform of the country's social insurance programs; and
4. reforms to strengthen contract enforcement and fight crime and corruption.

Despite reforms, weak control over privatization led many successful state enterprises to bankruptcy. The SDS government also failed to stop the growing negative account balance, which has since then continued to increase, reaching a negative of $12.65 billion in 2008. The government elected in 2001 pledged to maintain the fundamental economic policy objectives adopted by its predecessor in 1997, specifically: retaining the Currency Board, implementing sound financial policies, accelerating privatisation, and pursuing structural reforms. Both governments failed to implement sound social policies.

The economy really took off between 2003 and 2008 and growth figures quickly shot up, fluctuating between figures as high as 6.6% (2004) and 5.0% (2003). Even in the last pre-crisis year, 2008, the Bulgarian economy was growing rapidly at 6.0%, despite significantly slowing down in the last quarter.

=== Part of the European Union ===
On 1 January 2007, Bulgaria entered the European Union. This led to some immediate international trade liberalization, but there was no shock to the economy. The government ran annual surpluses of above 3%. This fact, together with annual GDP growth of above 5%, has brought the government indebtedness to 22.8% of GDP in 2006 from 67.3% five years earlier. This is to be contrasted with enormous current account deficits. Low interest rates guaranteed availability of funds for investment and consumption. For example, a boom in the real estate market started around 2003. At the same time annual inflation in the economy was variable and during the last five years (2003–2007) has seen a low of 2.3% and high of 7.3%. Most importantly, this poses a threat to the country's accession to the Eurozone. The Bulgarian government originally planned to adopt the Euro no sooner than 2015. Although Bulgaria since the beginning had the plan to have to adopt the euro as a condition to membership, plans would have been postponed until 2026, when with the arrive of the new year, they entered the euro. From a political point of view, there is a trade-off between Bulgaria's economic growth and the stability required for early accession to the monetary union. Bulgaria's per-capita PPP GDP is about 70% of the EU27 average (2025), while the country's nominal GDP per capita is about 43% of the EU27 average (2021). However, Bulgaria ranks 38th (2015) in the Ease of Doing Business rank list, higher than most other Eastern European states, and 40th (2012) in the Economic Freedom of the World index, outperforming Belgium, Spain, Poland, Hungary, Portugal. Bulgaria also has the lowest personal and corporate income tax rates in the EU, as well as the second lowest public debt of all European Union member states at 16.2% of GDP in 2010.

=== Great Recession ===
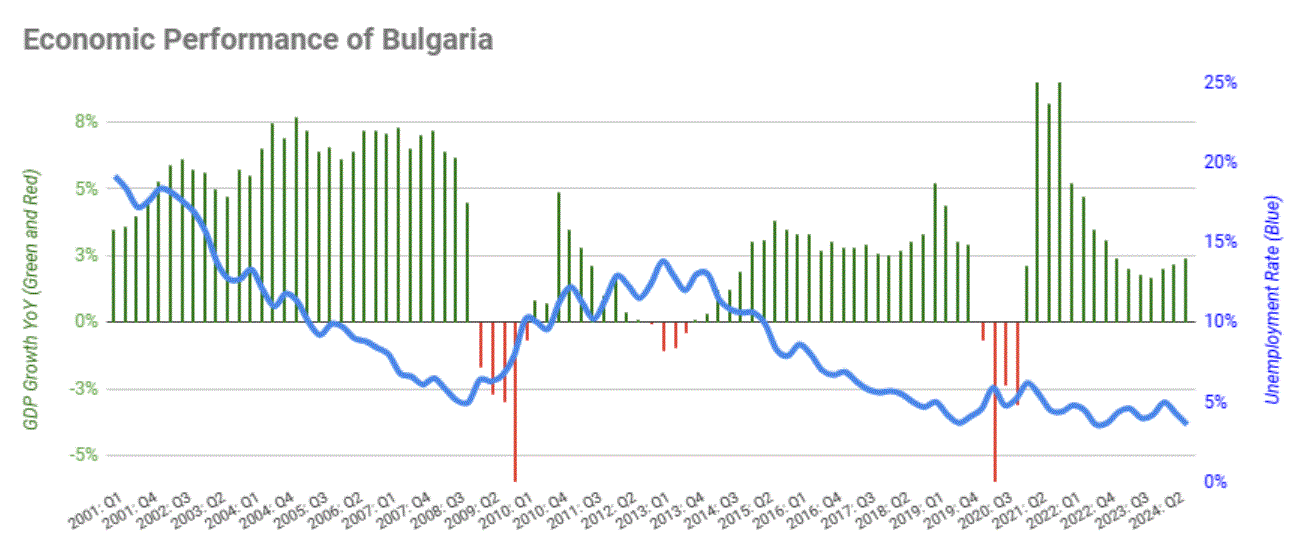
GDP Growth (green vs. red) and Unemployment (blue) since 2001

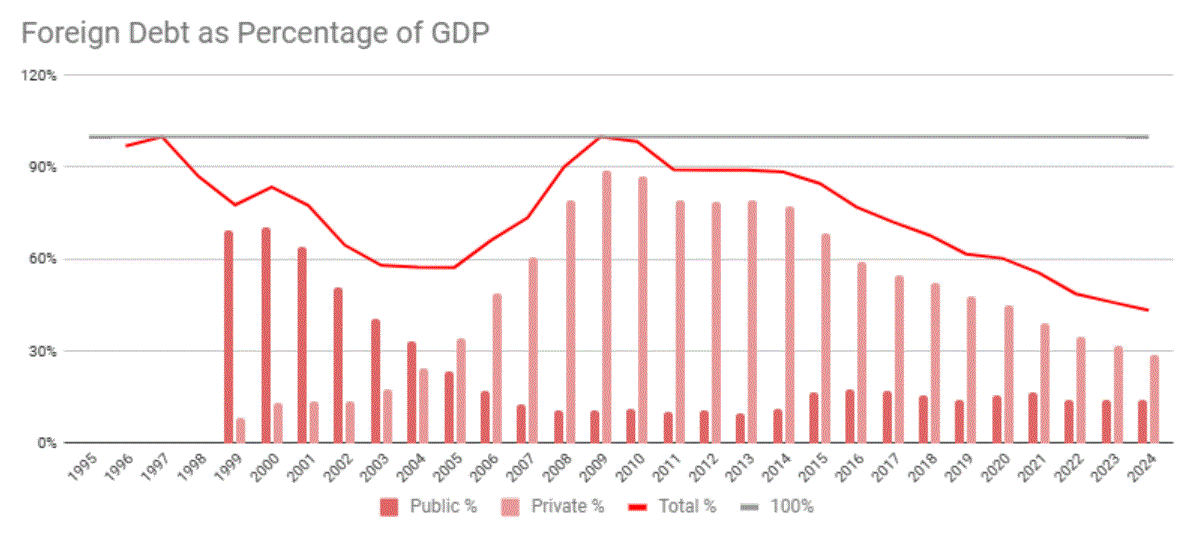
Public (dark red) vs. private (light red) foreign debt (red line)

The country suffered a difficult start to 2009, after gas supplies were cut in the Russia-Ukraine gas dispute. Industrial output suffered, as well as public services, exposing Bulgaria's overdependence on Russian raw materials. The Great Recession led to a decline in growth and employment by the last quarter of 2008. The real estate market, although not plummeting, ground to a halt and growth was significantly lower in the short-to-medium run.

During 2009, the grim forecasts for the effects of the Great Recession on the Bulgarian economy largely materialized. Although suffering less than the worst-hit countries, Bulgaria recorded its worst economic results since the 1997 meltdown. GDP shrank by around 5% and unemployment jumped. Consumer spending and foreign investment dropped dramatically and depressed growth in 2010 to 0.3%. Unemployment remains consistently high at around 10%.

=== New government and fiscal discipline ===
The government of Boyko Borisov elected in 2009 undertook steps to restore economic growth, while attempting to maintain a strict financial policy. The fiscal discipline set by Finance Minister Djankov proved successful and together with reduced budget spending it placed Bulgarian economy on the stage of steadily though slowly growing in the midst of world crisis. On 1 December 2009, Standard & Poor's upgraded Bulgaria's investment outlook from "negative" to "stable," which made Bulgaria the only country in the European Union to receive a positive upgrade that year. In January 2010 Moody's followed with an upgrade of its rating perspective from "stable" to "positive."

Bulgaria was expected to join the Eurozone in 2013 but after the rise of some instability in the zone Bulgaria is withholding its positions towards the Euro, combining positive and realistic attitudes. The 2012 Transatlantic Trends poll found that 72 percent of Bulgarians did not approve of the economic policy pursued by the government of the (then) ruling center-right GERB party and Prime Minister Boyko Borisov. In 2024, Bulgaria was making final preparations to adopt the Euro. Bulgaria adopted the euro on 1 January 2026.

== Economic statistics ==
=== Data ===
The following table shows the main economic indicators in 1980–2026.

Year	GDP (in Bil. US$ PPP)	GDP per capita (in US$ PPP)	GDP (in Bil. US$ nominal)	GDP growth (real)	Inflation rate (in Percent)	Unemployment (in Percent)	Budget balance (in % of GDP)	Government debt (in % of GDP)
1980	39.6	4,497	37.8	5.87%	n/a	n/a	n/a	n/a
1981	▲45.7	▲5,168	▲40.7	▲5.3%	0%	n/a	n/a	n/a
1982	▲50.5	▲5,701	▲42.5	▲4.2%	▲2.8%	n/a	n/a	n/a
1983	▲54.1	▲6,087	▲43.6	▲3.0%	2.8%	n/a	n/a	n/a
1984	▲58.6	▲6,585	▲46.4	▲4.6%	2.8%	n/a	n/a	n/a
1985	▲61.5	▲6,911	▼39.7	▲1.8%	2.8%	n/a	n/a	n/a
1986	▲66.1	▲7,426	▼35.1	▲5.3%	▼2.7%	n/a	n/a	n/a
1987	▲70.9	▲7,978	▲40.7	▲4.7%	2.7%	n/a	n/a	n/a
1988	▲75.2	▲8,480	▲66.5	▲2.4%	▼2.5%	n/a	n/a	n/a
1989	▲77.7	▲8,807	▲67.8	▼0.5%	▲6.4%	0.0%	n/a	n/a
1990	▼73.3	▼8,358	▼29.9	▼9.1%	▲23.9%	▲2.9%	n/a	n/a
1991	▼67.6	▼7,777	▼2.9	▼10.8%	▲335.5%	▲6.8%	n/a	n/a
1992	▼63.3	▼7,360	▼11.9	▼8.4%	▼82.0%	▲13.2%	n/a	n/a
1993	▼57.3	▼6,736	▼6.4	▼11.6%	▼72.8%	▲15.8%	n/a	n/a
1994	▼56.4	▼6,707	▲11.3	▼3.7%	▲96.0%	▼14.1%	n/a	n/a
1995	▲56.6	▼6,511	▲19.0	▼1.6%	▼62.1%	▼11.4%	n/a	n/a
1996	▼53.0	▼6,448	▼12.3	▼8.0%	▲123.0%	▼11.0%	n/a	n/a
1997	▲53.1	▲6,502	▼11.3	▼1.6%	▲1,061.2%	▲14.0%	n/a	n/a
1998	▲56.3	▲6,943	▲15.0	▲4.9%	▼18.7%	▼12.4%	▲1.2%	76.5%
1999	▲56.8	▲7,042	▼13.6	▼0.5%	▼2.6%	▲13.8%	▲0.2%	▲79.4%
2000	▲61.0	▲7,483	▼13.2	▲5.0%	▲10.3%	▲18.1%	▼0.6%	▼73.9%
2001	▲64.7	▲8,195	▲14.2	▲3.8%	▼7.4%	▼17.5%	▼0.6%	▼67.6%
2002	▲69.6	▲8,870	▲16.4	▲5.9%	▼5.8%	▼17.4%	▼0.6%	▼53.8%
2003	▲74.5	▲9,555	▲21.1	▲5.2%	▼2.3%	▼13.9%	0.0%	▼45.8%
2004	▲81.5	▲10,498	▲26.2	▲6.4%	▲6.1%	▼12.2%	▲1.6%	▼38.1%
2005	▲90.0	▲11,660	▲29.9	▲7.1%	▼6.0%	▼10.2%	▲2.2%	▼28.7%
2006	▲99.1	▲12,904	▲34.4	▲6.9%	▲7.4%	▼9.0%	▲3.2%	▼22.8%
2007	▲109.2	▲14,297	▲44.4	▲7.3%	▲7.6%	▼6.9%	▲3.1%	▼17.6%
2008	▲118.1	▲15,521	▲54.5	▲6.0%	▲12.0%	▼5.7%	▲2.7%	▼14.7%
2009	▼114.7	▼15,164	▲52.0	▼3.6%	▼2.5%	▲6.9%	▼0.9%	▼14.6%
2010	▲117.6	▲15,666	▼50.7	▲1.3%	▲3.0%	▲10.3%	▼3.8%	▼14.1%
2011	▲122.3	▲16,694	▲57.7	▲1.9%	▲3.4%	▲11.4%	▼1.8%	▲14.4%
2012	▲124.7	▲17,120	▼54.3	0.0%	▼2.4%	▲12.4%	▼0.4%	▲16.7%
2013	▲127.5	▲17,600	▲55.8	▲0.5%	▼0.4%	▲13.0%	▼1.8%	▲17.2%
2014	▲132.3	▲18,373	▲57.1	▲1.8%	▼ -1.6%	▼11.5%	▼3.7%	▲26.4%
2015	▲138.4	▲19,344	▼50.8	▲3.5%	▲ -1.1%	▼9.2%	▼2.8%	▼25.6%
2016	▲145.5	▲20,474	▲54.0	▲3.9%	▼ -1.3%	▼7.7%	▲1.6%	▲27.4%
2017	▲153.8	▲21,817	▲59.3	▲3.8%	▲1.2%	▼6.3%	▲0.8%	▼23.3%
2018	▲162.3	▲23,155	▲66.4	▲3.2%	▲2.6%	▼5.2%	▲0.1%	▼20.5%
2019	▲177.1		▲68.51	▲3.8%	▼2.5%	▼4.3%	▼ -1.0%	▼18.4%
2020	▲179.17		▲70.6	▼ -3.1%	▼1.2%	▲5.2%	▼ -2.9%	▲22.7%
2021	▲203.06		▲84.44	▲7.8%	▲2.8%	5.2%	▲ -2.8%	▲23.9%
2022	▲226.39		▲90.72	▼4.1%	▲13.0%	▼4.2%	▲ -0.8%	▼22.5%
2023	▲238.71		▲102.24	▼1.7%	▼8.6%	▲4.4%	▼ -3.0%	▲22.9%
2024	▲252.92		▲113.36	▲3.4%	▼2.6%	▼4.2%	-3.0%	▲23.8%
2025	▲268.15		▲131.02	▼3.1%	▲3.5%	▼3.6%	-3.0%	▲27.1%
2026	▲283.48		▲148.12	▼2.8%	▲3.8%	▼3.4%	▼ -3.3%	▲28.2%

Industrial production
Kozloduy Nuclear Power Plant - the largest Power Plant in Southeastern Europe
Main industries	Metallurgical industry, electricity, electronics, machinery and equipment, shipbuilding, petrochemicals, cement and construction, textiles, food and beverages, mining, tourism
Industrial growth rate	5.5% (2007)
Labor force	33.6% of total labor force
GDP of sector	31.3% of total GDP

Household income or consumption by percentage share:

- lowest 10%: 2.9%
- highest 10%: 25.4% (25.4)

Distribution of family income - Gini index: 36.6% (2013)

Industrial production growth rate: 11.3% (Third Quarter)

Electricity:

- production: 45.7 TWh (2006)
- consumption: 37.4 TWh (2006)
- exports: 7.8 TWh (2006)
- imports: 0 TWh (2006)

Electricity - production by source:

- fossil fuel: 47.8%
- hydro: 8.1%
- nuclear: 44.1%
- other: 0% (2001)

Oil:

- production: 3,000 bbl/day (2005 est.)
- consumption: 131,400 bbl/day (2005 est.)
- exports: 51,000 (2005 est.)
- imports: 138,800 (2004 est.)
- proved reserves: 15 million bbl (1 January 2006)

Natural gas:

- production: 407,000 cu m (2005 est.)
- consumption: 5.179 billion cu m (2005 est.)
- exports: 0 cu m (2005 est.)
- imports: 5.8 billion cu m (2005)
- proved reserves: 5.703 billion cu m (1 January 2006 est.)

Agriculture - products: vegetables, fruits, tobacco, livestock, wine, wheat, barley, sunflowers, sugar beets

Current account balance: $ -5.01 billion (2006 est.)

Reserves of foreign exchange & gold: $11.78 billion (2006 est.)

Exchange rates:

Year	2000	2001	2002	2003	2004	2005	2006	2007
Rate	2.12	2.18	2.08	1.73	1.58	1.57	1.56	1.43

== Sectors ==
In 2022, the sector with the highest number of companies registered in Bulgaria is Services with 200,853 companies, followed by Retail Trade with 173,189 companies.

=== Industry and construction ===
Much of Bulgaria's communist-era industry was heavy industry, although biochemicals and computers were significant products beginning in the 1980s. Because Bulgarian industry was configured to Soviet markets, the end of the Soviet Union and the Warsaw Pact caused a severe crisis in the 1990s. After showing its first growth since the communist era in 2000, Bulgaria's industrial sector has grown slowly but steadily in the early 2000s. The performance of individual manufacturing industries has been uneven, however. Food processing and tobacco processing suffered from the loss of Soviet markets and have not maintained standards high enough to compete in Western Europe. Textile processing generally has declined since the mid-1990s, although clothing exports have grown steadily since 2000.

Oil refining survived the shocks of the 1990s because of a continuing export market and the purchase of the Burgas refinery by the Russian oil giant LUKoil. The chemical industry has remained in good overall condition, but is subject to fluctuating natural gas prices. Growth in ferrous metallurgy, which is dominated by the Kremikovtsi Metals Combine, has been delayed by a complex privatization process and by obsolete capital equipment. Non-ferrous metallurgy has prospered because the Pirdop copper smelting plant was bought by Union Minière of Belgium and because export markets have been favourable.

The end of the Warsaw Pact alliance and the loss of Third World markets were grave blows to the defence industry. In the early 2000s, the industry's plan for survival has included upgrading products to satisfy Western markets and doing cooperative manufacturing with Russian companies. The electronics industry, which also was configured in the 1980s to serve Soviet markets, has not been able to compete with Western computer manufacturers. The industry now relies on contract agreements with European firms and attracting foreign investment. The automotive industry has ceased the manufacture of cars, trucks, and buses. The manufacture of forklifts, a speciality in the communist era, also has stopped. In the early 2000s, shipbuilding has prospered at the major Varna and Ruse yards because of foreign ownership (Ruse) and privatization (Varna).

Only in recent years electronics and electric equipment production has regained higher levels. The largest centres include Sofia, Plovdiv and the surrounding area, Botevgrad, Stara Zagora, Varna, Pravets and many other cities. Household appliances, computers, CDs, telephones, medical and scientific equipment are being produced. In 2008, the electronics industry shipped more than $260 million in exports, primarily of components, computers and consumer electronics.

Many factories producing transportation equipment currently still do not operate at full capacity. Plants produce trains (Burgas, Dryanovo), trams (Sofia), trolleys (Dupnitsa), buses (Botevgrad), trucks (Shumen), motor trucks (Plovdiv, Lom, Sofia, Lovech). Lovech has an automotive assembly plant. Rousse serves as the main centre for agricultural machinery. Bulgarian arms production mainly operates in central Bulgaria (Kazanlak, Sopot, Karlovo).

Construction output fell dramatically in the 1990s as industrial and housing construction declined, but a recovery began in the early 2000s. The sector, now dominated by private firms, has resumed the foreign building programs that led to prosperity in the communist era. The Glavbolgarstroy firm has major building projects in Kazakhstan, Russia, and Ukraine as well as domestic contracts.

One of the biggest Romanian investments in Bulgaria is in the construction/retail industry, namely the Budmax brand of construction supply stores (owned by Arabesque).

=== Energy ===
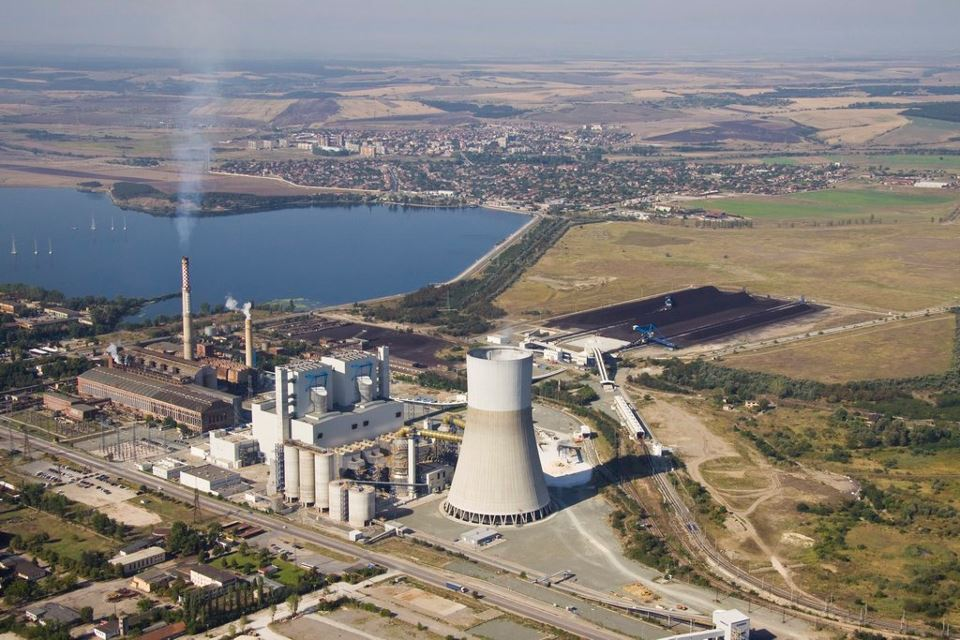
AES Galabovo, part of Maritza Iztok Complex

Bulgaria relies on imported oil and natural gas (most of which comes from Russia), together with domestic generation of electricity from coal-powered and hydro plants, and the Kozloduy nuclear plant. Bulgaria imports 97% of its natural gas from Russia. The economy remains energy-intensive because conservation practices have developed slowly. The country is a major regional electricity producer. Bulgaria produced 38.07 billion kWh of electricity in 2006 (in comparison, Romania, which has a population nearly three times larger than Bulgaria, produced 51.7 billion kW·h in the same year). The domestic power-generating industry, which was privatized in 2004 by sales to interests from Europe, Japan, Russia, and the United States, suffers from obsolete equipment and a weak oversight agency. To solve the latter problem, in 2008 the government set up a state-owned energy holding-company (Bulgarian Energy Holding EAD), composed of gas company Bulgargaz, Bulgartransgaz, power company NEK EAD, Electricity System Operator EAD, Kozloduy nuclear power station, Maritza-Iztok II thermal power station, the Mini Maritza Iztok (Maritza Iztok mines), and Bulgartel EAD. The state holds a 100% stake in the holding company. Most of Bulgaria's conventional power stations will require large-scale modernization in the near future. Bulgaria has some 64 small hydroelectric plants, which together produce 19 percent of the country's power output.

The Kozloduy nuclear plant, which in 2005 supplied more than 40 percent of Bulgaria's electric power, will play a diminishing role because two of its remaining four reactors (two were closed in 2002) must be closed by 2007 to comply with European Union (EU) standards. Kozloduy, which exported 14 percent of its output in 2006, was expected to cease all exportation in 2007. Construction of the long-delayed Belene nuclear plant resumed in 2006, although the project was canceled in 2012. Despite that, there were attempts to restart the project. Belene, planned in the 1980s but then rejected, was revived by the safety controversy at Kozloduy.

Oil exploration is ongoing offshore in the Black Sea (the Shabla block) and on the Romanian border, but Bulgaria's chief oil income is likely to come as a transfer point on east–west and north–south transit lines. Burgas is Bulgaria's main oil port on the Black Sea. Bulgaria's largest oil refinery, Neftochim, was purchased by Russian oil giant LUKoil in 1999 and underwent modernization in 2005. Bulgaria's only significant coal resource is low-quality lignite, mainly from the state-owned Maritsa-Iztok and Bobov Dol complexes and used in local thermoelectric power stations.

Thermal power stations (TPPs) provide a significant amount of energy, with most of the capacity concentrated in the Maritsa Iztok Complex. The largest TPPs include:

- Maritsa Iztok 2: 1,450 MW
- Varna: 1,260 MW
- Maritsa Iztok 3: 870 MW
- Bobov Dol: 630 MW
- Ruse Iztok: 600 MW
- Maritsa Iztok 1/ TETS Galabovo: 650 MW

A$1.4 bln. project for the construction of an additional 670 MW block for the 500 MW Maritza Iztok 1 Thermal Power Station was completed on 3 June 2011.

Bulgaria ranks as a minor oil producer (97th in the world) with a total production of 3,520 bbl/day. Prospectors discovered Bulgaria's first oil field near Tyulenovo in 1951. Proved reserves amount to 15,000,000 bbl (2,400,000 m^{3}). Natural gas production halted in the late 1990s. Proved reserves of natural gas amount to 5.663 bln. cu m. The LUKOIL Neftochim oil refinery is Bulgaria's largest refining facility with annual revenues amounting to more than 4 billion leva (2 billion euro).

Recent years have seen a steady increase in electricity production from renewable energy sources such as wind and solar power. Wind energy has large-scale prospects, with up to 3,400 MW of installed capacity potential. As of 2009 Bulgaria operates more than 70 wind turbines with a total capacity of 112.6 MW, and plans to increase their number nearly threefold to reach a total capacity of 300 MW in 2010.

From 2010 to 2017, the import of waste for energy production increased for almost five times. Since 2014, the European Commission financed the installation of a plant for cogeneration of heat and electricity from refuse-derived fuel to be located in Sofia. In 2017, the Bulgaria's Ministry of Environment and Waters reported to the Basel convention that Bulgaria had imported "69,683 tonnes of waste for incineration in a form of RDF, SRF, pretreated mixed waste and mixed contaminated plastics." As of March 2021, the total amount of tons of waste annually imported is substantially unknown.

=== Services and tourism ===
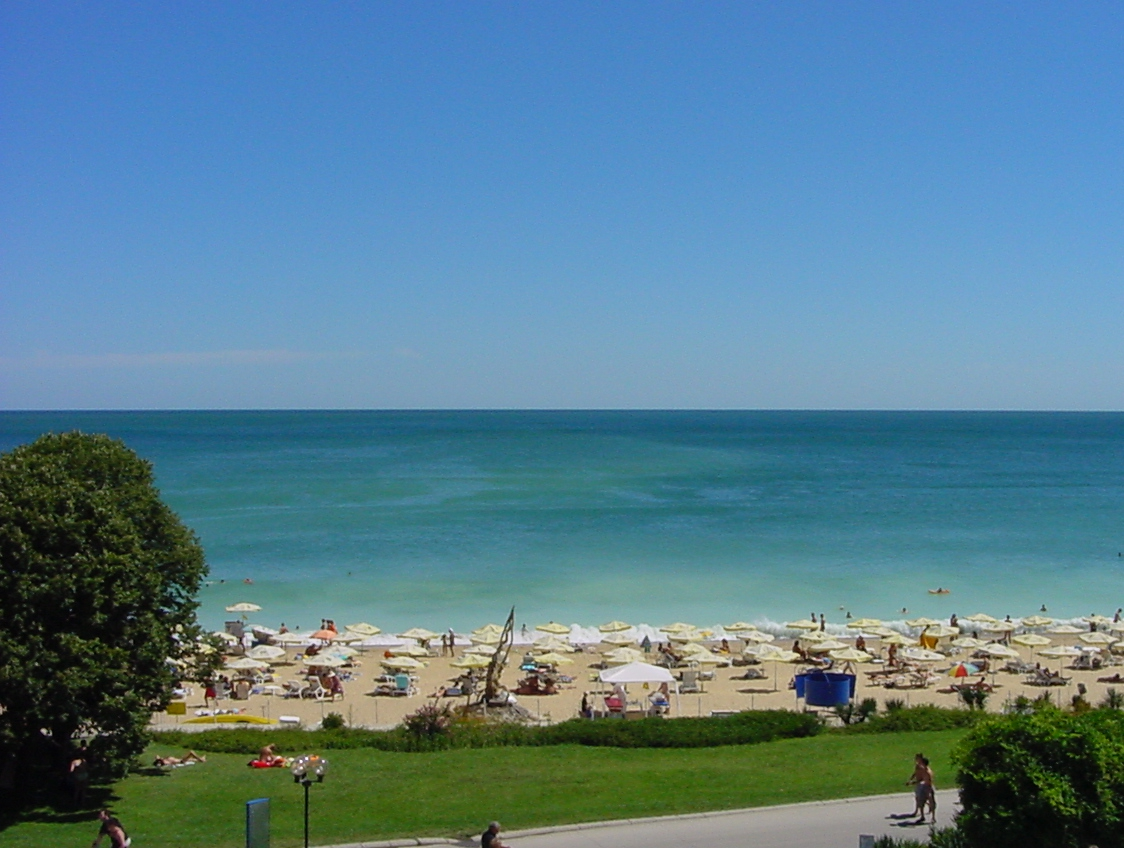
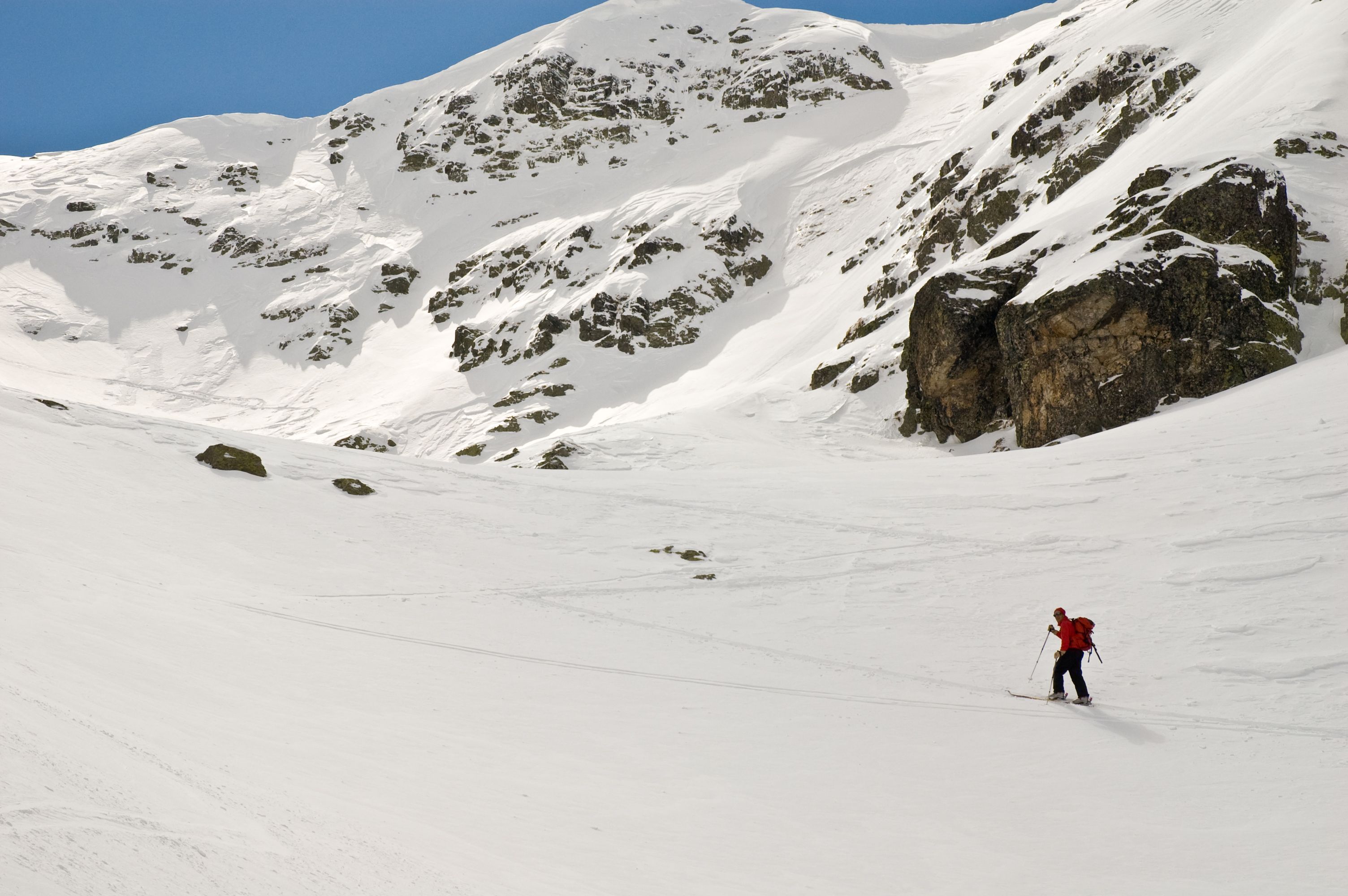
Bulgarian summer and winter resorts are increasingly attracting tourists.

Although the contribution of services to gross domestic product (GDP) has more than doubled in the post-communist era, a substantial share of that growth has been in government services, and the qualitative level of services varies greatly. The Bulgarian banking system, which was weak in the first post-communist years, was fully reformed in the late 1990s, including stronger oversight from the National Bank of Bulgaria and gradual privatisation. In 2003, the banking system was fully privatised, and substantial consolidation began making the system more efficient in 2004. Several smaller banks grew substantially between 2004 and 2006. These processes increased public confidence in the banks. Although the system still requires consolidation, loan activity to individuals and businesses increased in the early 2000s. The insurance industry has grown rapidly since a market reform in 1997, with the help of foreign firms. An example is the Bulgarian Insurance Group (BIG), a pension-fund and insurance management company owned by the Dutch-Israeli TBI Holding Company and the European Bank for Reconstruction and Development (EBRD). The introduction of health and pension insurance plans has expanded the private insurance industry. A series of reform laws in the early 2000s enabled the Bulgarian Stock Exchange to begin regular operation. As of 2005, stock market activity was limited by lack of transparency, although the growth rate increased beginning in 2004.

After a decline in the 1990s, in the 21st century the tourism industry has grown rapidly. In 2016 some 10 million foreigners visited Bulgaria, up from 4 million in 2004 and 2.3 million in 2000. This trend is based on a number of attractive destinations, low costs, and restoration of facilities. Most of the industry had been privatised by 2004. Infrastructure items such as recreation facilities and booking services require improvement. Development of Bulgaria's retail sales sector was slow until the early 2000s, when a large number of Western-style outlets began to appear, and Sofia developed as a retail center. By 2006, several major European retail chains had opened stores, and others planned to enter the Bulgarian market.

Bulgaria has attracted considerable investment from foreigners buying property either for their own use or for investment. In 2006, more than 29% of property deals were signed by foreigners, more than half of whom were British citizens. Various companies, such as Bulgarian Dreams, actively marketed Bulgarian properties to buyers overseas.

In 2007 Bulgaria was visited by 5,200,000 tourists, ranking 39th in the world. Tourists from Greece, Romania and Germany account for 40% of visitors. Significant numbers of British (+300,000), Russian (+200,000), Serbian (+150,000), Polish (+130,000) and Danish (+100,000) tourists also visit Bulgaria. Most of them are attracted by the varying and beautiful landscapes, well-preserved historical and cultural heritage, and the tranquility of rural and mountain areas.

In Easter of 2018 it was reported that around 90% of tourists in Varna, one of Bulgaria's largest tourism locations, came from Romania.

Main destinations include the capital Sofia, coastal resorts Sunny Beach, Albena, Sozopol, Sveti Vlas; winter resorts Bansko, Pamporovo, Chepelare and Borovetz. Arbanasi and Bozhentsi are rural tourist destinations with well-preserved ethnographic traditions. Other popular attractions are the 10th century Rila Monastery and the 19th century Euxinograd château.

=== Agriculture, forestry, and fishing ===
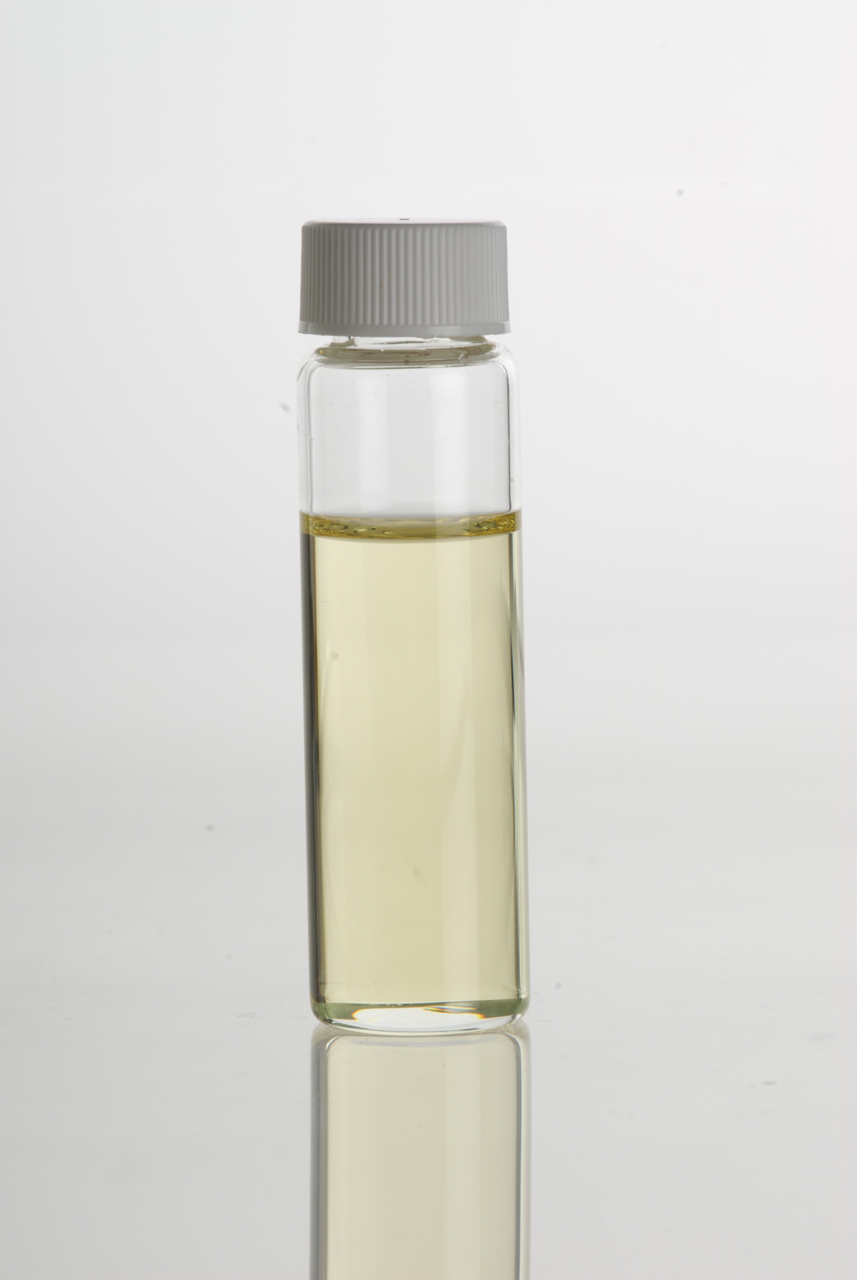
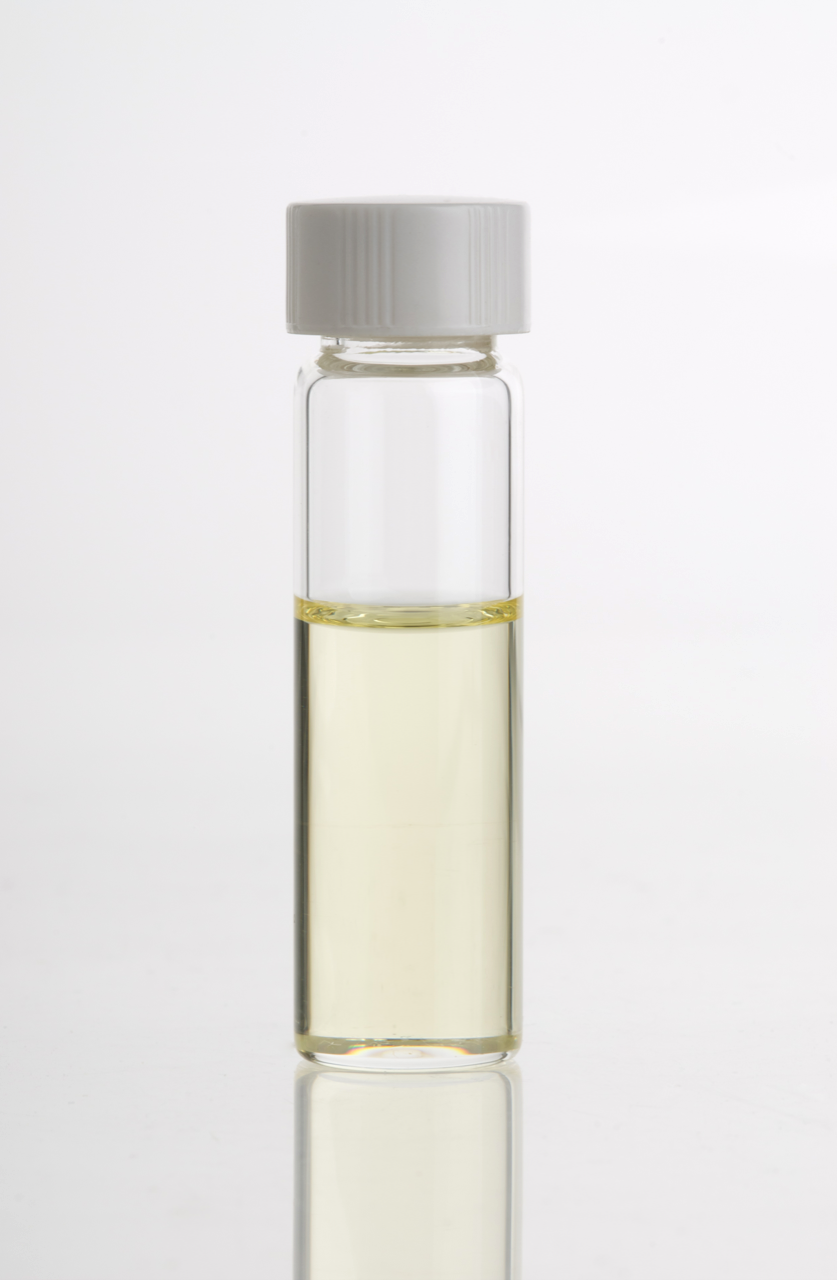
Bulgaria is the largest world producer of rose and lavender oil, the most widely used essential oils in perfumery.

In the communist era, Bulgaria's agriculture was heavily centralized, integrated with agriculture-related industries, and state-run. In the postcommunist era, the process of restoring agricultural land to private owners has been in a form that ensures productivity has been slow. Bank investment and insecurity in the land market contributed to slow development in the 1990s. By 2004 some 98 percent of the workforce and output of Bulgaria's agricultural sector was private, including a number of large private cooperative enterprises. A significant amount of food also is produced for direct consumption by non-farmers on small plots, which are an important support for parts of the population. In 2000 and 2003, droughts limited agricultural production, and floods had the same effect in 2005. Bulgaria's main field crops are wheat, corn, and barley. The main industrial crops are sugar beets, sunflowers, and tobacco. Tomatoes, cucumbers, and peppers are the most important vegetable exports. Production of apples and grapes, Bulgaria's largest fruit products, has decreased since the communist era, but the export of wine has increased significantly. The most important types of livestock are cattle, sheep, poultry, pigs, and buffaloes, and the main dairy products are yogurt, cow and sheep cheese. Bulgaria is the world's 13th largest sheep milk producer and is the 15th largest producer of tobacco and 13th largest producer of raspberries in Europe. Specialized equipment amounts to some 25,000 tractors and 5,500 combine harvesters, with a fleet of light aircraft.

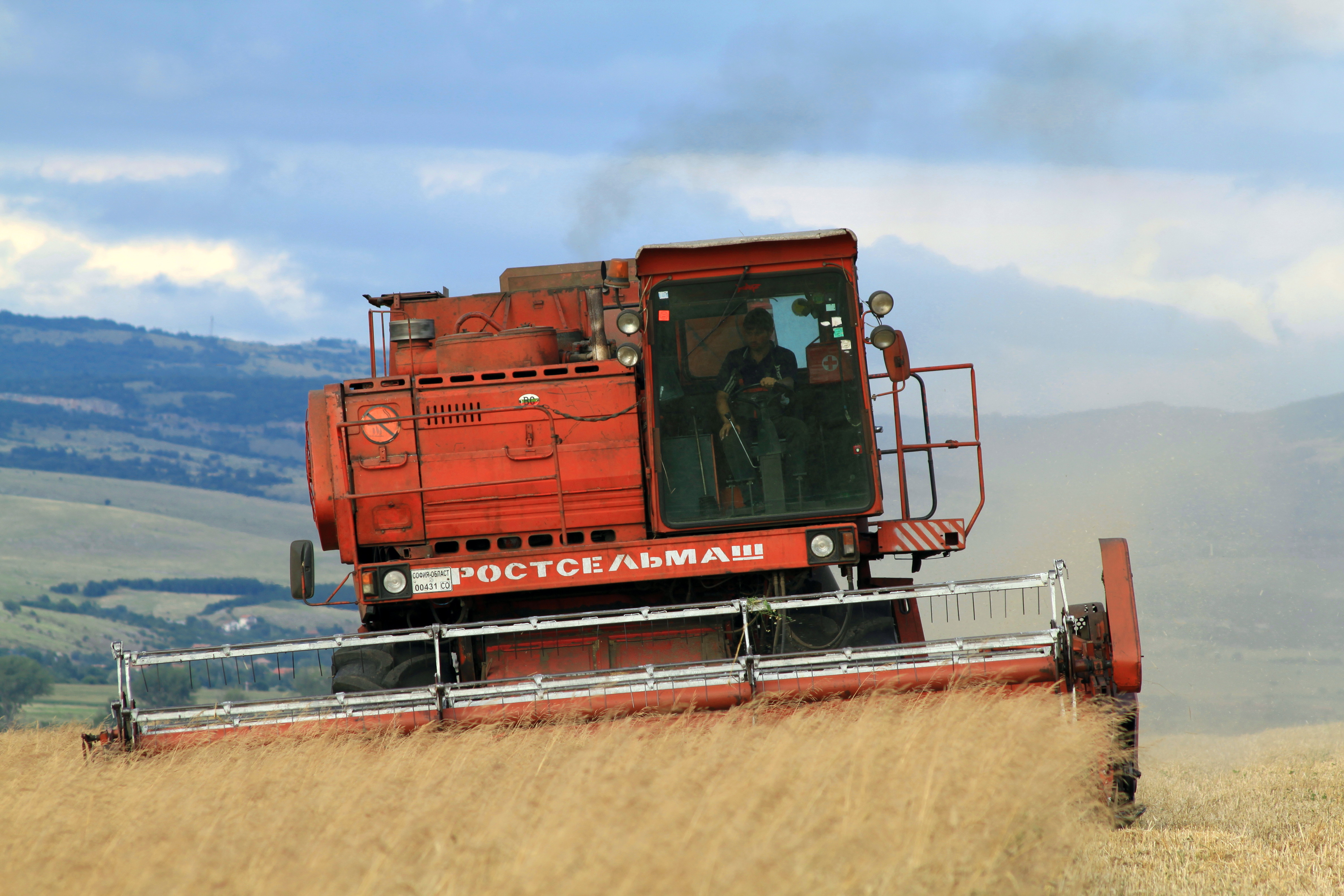
Combine harvester near Slivnitsa. About 43% of Bulgaria's land is arable.

In 2004, an estimated one-third of Bulgaria's land mass was covered by forests, of which about 40 percent was conifers. Between 1980 and 2000, the forested area increased by 4.6 percent. In 2002 a total of 4,800 tons of timber was harvested, 44 percent of which was fuel wood and 20 percent, pulpwood. Although nominal state timber standards are very strict, in 2004 an estimated 45 percent of Bulgaria's timber harvest was logged illegally because of corruption in the forest service. Some 7.5 percent of forests are protected from all uses, and 65 percent are designated for ecological and commercial use. In 2005, about 70 percent of the total forest resource was rated economically viable.

Since Bulgaria stopped high-seas fishing in 1995, the country has imported increasing amounts of fish. The fish farming industry (particularly sturgeon) has expanded in the early 2000s, and some environmental improvements in the Black Sea and the Danube River, the principal sources of fish, may increase the take in future years. However, the catch from those sources has decreased sharply in recent decades, yielding only a few species of fish for domestic markets in 2004. Between 1999 and 2001, Bulgaria's total fish harvest, wild and cultivated, dropped from 18,600 tons to 8,100 tons, but in 2003 the harvest had recovered to 16,500 tons.

Production of the most important crops (according to the Food and Agriculture Organization) in 2006 (in '000 tons) amounted to: wheat 3301.9; sunflower 1196.6; maize 1587.8; grapes 266.2; tobacco 42.0; tomatoes 213.0; barley 546.3; potatoes 386.1; peppers 156.7; cucumbers 61.5; cherries 18.2; watermelons 136.0; cabbage 72.7; apples 26.1; plums 18.0; strawberries 8.8.

=== Mining and minerals ===
Bulgaria's mining industry has declined in the post-communist era. Many deposits have remained underdeveloped because of a lack of modern equipment and low funding. Mining has contributed less than 2 percent of GDP and engaged less than 3 percent of the workforce in the early 2000s. Bulgaria has the following estimated deposits of metallic minerals: 207 million tons of iron ore, 127 million tons of manganese ore, 936 million tons of copper ore, 238 million tons of chromium ore, and 150 million tons of gold ore. Several of Bulgaria's minerals are extracted commercially; 80 percent of mining is done by open-pit excavation. Iron extraction at Kremikovtsi and elsewhere is not sufficient to support the domestic steel industry, but copper, lead, and zinc deposits fully supply the nonferrous metallurgy industries. A British firm has exploratory gold mines at Dikanyite and Gornoseltsi, and a domestic copper and gold mine operates at Chelopech. About 50 nonmetallic minerals are present in significant amounts. Substantial amounts of uranium are present in the Rhodope Mountains, but no extraction has occurred in the last 10 years.

Despite the poor performance of the mining sector, productivity has increased in recent years. Mining remains one of the most important sources of export earnings and is still a significant contributor to economic growth. The mining industry is worth $760 mln, and, along with related industries, employs 120,000 people. The rising global prices of gold, lead and copper in 2010, as well as investments in zinc and coal production, have boosted economic growth in the mining sector after the Great Recession. As of 2010, Bulgaria ranks as the 19th largest coal producer in the world, 9th largest bismuth producer, 19th largest copper producer, and the 26th largest zinc producer. In Europe, the country ranks fourth in gold production and sixth in coal production.

The "Elatsite" copper mine and reprocessing facility, built during Vulko Chervenkov's rule, takes its place as one of the largest in South-Eastern Europe. It extracts 13 million tonnes of ore annually, producing about 42,000 tonnes of copper, 1.6 tonnes of gold and 5.5 tonnes of silver.

Ferrous metallurgy has major importance. Much of the production of steel and pig iron takes place in Kremikovtsi and Stomana steel in Pernik, with a third metallurgical base in Debelt. In production of steel and steel products per capita the country heads the Balkans. As of 2009 the fate of Kremikovtsi steel factories has come under debate because of serious pollution in the capital, Sofia.

The largest refineries for lead and zinc operate in Plovdiv, Kardzhali and Novi Iskar; for copper in Pirdop and Eliseina (now defunct); for aluminium in Shumen. In production of many metals per capita, such as zinc and iron, Bulgaria ranks first in Eastern Europe.

=== Infrastructure ===
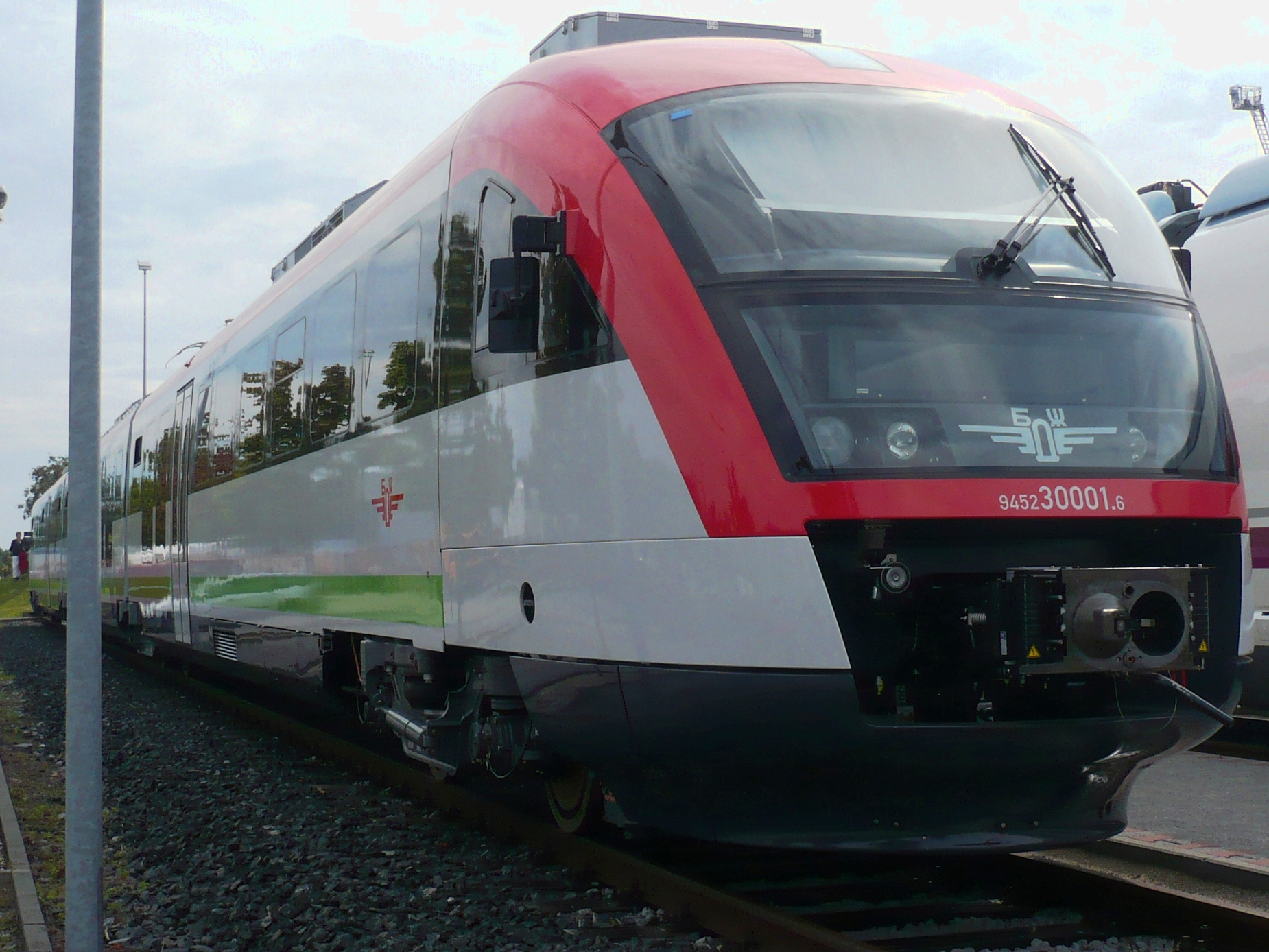
A Siemens railcar of the Bulgarian State Railways. Bulgaria's largely antiquated rail transport system is gradually being modernized.

Bulgaria's national road network has a total length of 40,231 kilometers (24,998 mi), of which 39,587 kilometers (24,598 mi) are paved. The motorways in Bulgaria, such as Trakia, Hemus, Struma and Maritsa, are being improved and elongated to a total length of 760 km (470 mi) as of November 2015. Railroads are a major mode of freight transportation, although highways carry a progressively larger share of freight. Bulgaria also has 6,238 kilometers (3,876 mi) of railway track and plans to construct a high-speed railway by 2017, at a cost of €3 bln. Sofia and Plovdiv are major air travel hubs, while Varna and Burgas are the principal maritime trade ports.

Bulgaria has an extensive, but antiquated telecommunications network which requires substantial modernization. Telephone service is available in most villages, and a central digital trunk line connects most regions. Currently, there are three active mobile phone operators - A1 Bulgaria, Telenor and Vivacom. Since 2000, a rapid increase in the number of Internet users has occurred – from 430,000 they grew to 1,545,100 in 2004, and 3.4 million (48% penetration rate) in 2010. In 2017, the Internet users in Bulgaria are 4.2 million people (59.8% penetration rate). Bulgaria had the 3rd fastest Average Broadband Internet Speed in the world, after Romania and South Korea, in 2011. In 2017, Bulgaria ranks 27th in the world in the Mean Download Speed chart with 17.54 Mbit/s, ranks 31st in the world in the Average Monthly Broadband Cost chart with $28.81, and holds the 18th position in the world in the Speed/Cost Ratio with as much as 0.61.

=== Science and technology ===
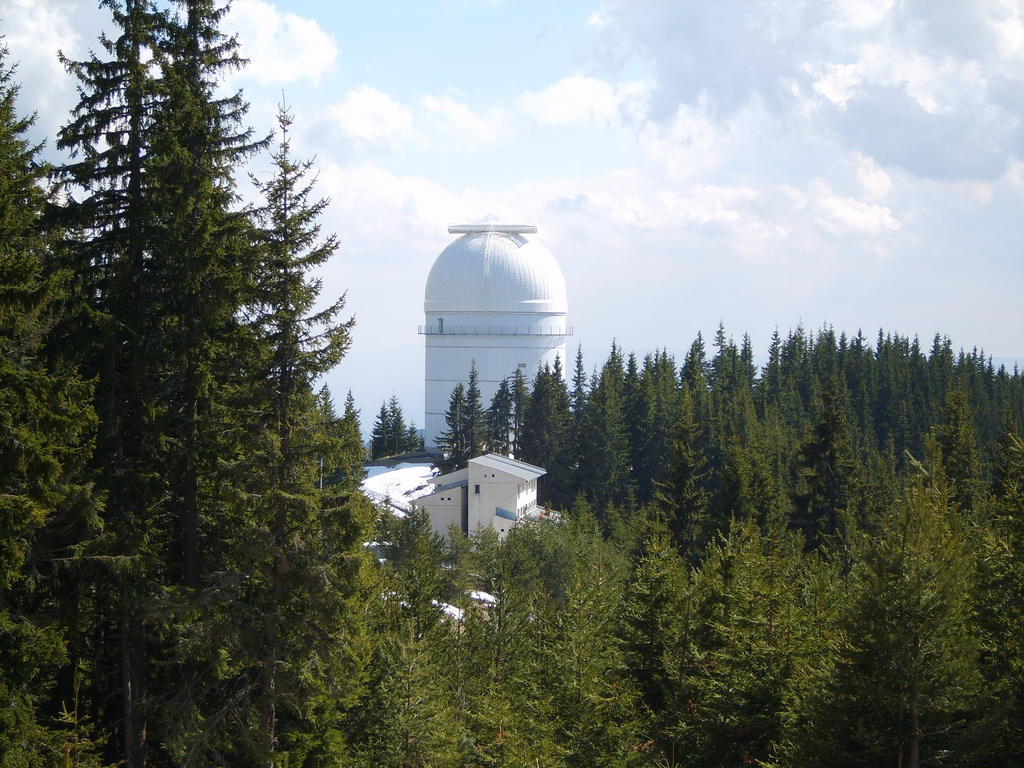
Tower of the 200 cm (79 in) telescope at the Rozhen Observatory

In 2010, Bulgaria spent 0.25% of its GDP on scientific research, which represents one of the lowest scientific budgets in Europe. Chronic underinvestment in the sector since 1990 forced many scientific professionals to leave the country. As a result, Bulgaria's economy scores low in terms of innovation, competitiveness and high added value exports. Nevertheless, Bulgaria ranked 8th in the world in 2002 by total number of ICT specialists, outperforming countries with far larger populations, and it operates the only supercomputer in the Balkan region, an IBM Blue Gene/P, which entered service in September 2008.

The Bulgarian Academy of Sciences (BAS) is the leading scientific institution in the country and employs most of Bulgaria's researchers in its numerous branches. The principal areas of research and development are energy, nanotechnology, archaeology and medicine. With major-general Georgi Ivanov flying on Soyuz 33 in 1979, Bulgaria became the 6th country in the world to have an astronaut in space. Bulgaria has deployed its own experiments on various missions, such as the RADOM-7 dosimeters on the International Space Station and Chandrayaan-1 and the space greenhouse (a Bulgarian invention) on the Mir space station. In 2011, the government announced plans to reboot the space program by producing a new microsatellite and joining the European Space Agency.

In June 2017, Bulgaria launched BulgariaSat-1, its first geostationary communications satellite. BulgariaSat-1 is a geostationary communications satellite operated by Bulgaria Sat and manufactured by SSL, based on the space-proven SSL 1300 satellite platform. BulgariaSat-1 is the first in the history of the country geostationary communications satellite at the Bulgarian orbital position, and it is designed to provide Direct-to-Home (DTH) television service and data communications services to the Balkans and other European regions. In this way, Bulgaria will be among other European countries with their satellites, namely Belarus, France, Greece, Italy, Luxembourg, Norway, Russia, Spain, Sweden, Turkey and the United Kingdom.

Due to its large-scale computing technology exports to COMECON states, in the 1980s Bulgaria became known as the Silicon Valley of the Eastern Bloc.

== Labour ==
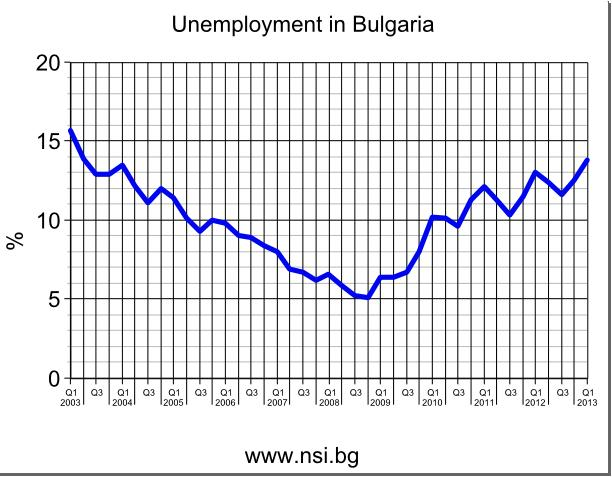
Unemployment in Bulgaria (Q1 2003- Q1 2013)

In 2005, the labour force was estimated at 3.3 million; in 2004, 11 percent worked in agriculture, 33 percent in industry, and 56 percent in services. The unemployment rate has been in double digits throughout the post-communist era, reaching a high point of 19 percent in 2000. Since then, the rate has decreased substantially with the creation of new jobs in private and state enterprises. In 2005 the official figure was 11.5 percent, compared with 16.9 percent at the end of 2002. However, in 2003 an estimated 500,000 Bulgarians were unemployed but not officially counted because they were not seeking work. In January 2005, the government raised the minimum wage by 25 percent, to US$90 per month. The largest labour unions are Podkrepa (Support) and the Confederation of Independent Trade Unions in Bulgaria. They represent labour in the National Council for Tripartite Partnership, in which they join government and business representatives to discuss issues of labour, social security, and living standards. The unions were an important political force in the fall of the Zhivkov regime. In late autumn of 2016 reported an unemployment rate of 7%. The annual median disposable income was $14,990 PPP in 2021. In 2016, the government increased the minimum wage to 215 euros per month. At the end of 2016 the average monthly salary is about 480 euros a month, but there are differences in the regions of the country. The average monthly gross salary has reached the value of 1,036 leva (530 euro) in March 2017. According to the latest Annual report of the Institute of Economic Studies at the Bulgarian Academy of Sciences, the average salary in Bulgaria is only a quarter (1/4) of the average salary in the EU, and should be two times higher when the labour productivity is calculated in the formula.

== Currency and inflation ==
Bulgaria's currency used to be the lev (pl., leva). In 1999, the value of the lev was pegged to that of the German Deutschmark, which was replaced by the euro in 2001. Following Bulgaria's admission to the EU, the euro was introduced on 1 January 2026 and the lev ceased to be legal tender on 1 February 2026.

In 2003 Bulgaria's inflation rate was estimated at between 2.3 and 3 percent. The rate was 6 percent in 2004 and 5 percent in 2005. In 2015 and 2016 it was recorded minimum level of deflation.

== Taxation, state budget and debt ==
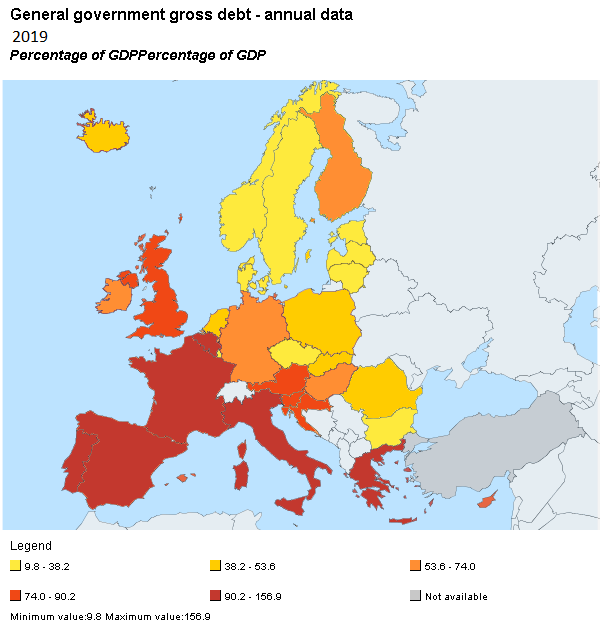
Government debt as a percent of GDP in EU in 2012. Bulgaria has one of the lowest rates of Debt-to-GDP ratio.

As of 1 January 2008 the income tax for all citizens is set to a flat rate of 10%. This flat tax is one of the lowest income rates in the world and the lowest income rate in the European Union. The reform was done in pursuit of higher GDP growth and greater tax collection rates. Some called it a "revolution" in taxation, but the changes were met with mild discussions and some protests by affected working classes. The proposal was modified to allow for compensating the perceived losers from the changes in the tax formula. The corporate income tax is also 10% as of 1 January 2007 which is also among the lowest in Europe. Currently, this taxation is kept while other countries raised their taxes during the crisis. However, most of the state revenues come from VAT and excises, but share of income and corporate taxes in the revenues is increasing.

For 2005 Bulgaria's estimated state revenues totaled US$11.2 billion, and its estimated state expenditures, including capital expenditures, were US$10.9 billion, yielding a surplus of US$300 million. In 2004 revenues totaled US$10.1 billion and expenditures US$9.7 billion, for a surplus of US$400 million.

After the political changes, in 1991, Bulgaria had a US$11.25 billion state debt, which represented 180% of the GDP. The state debt peaked in 1994, when it reached US$14.4 billion. During 1998-2008 Bulgaria maintained policy of budget surpluses, which reduced the state debt to 5.07 billion euro. Combined with the economic growth in that period, the state debt dropped to a record low of 13.7% of GDP, one of the lowest in the European Union. In 2008 Bulgaria also maintained 4.286 billion euro fiscal reserve, meaning that net state debt at this moment was only 0.784 billion euro. After the Great Recession Bulgaria turned to policy of deficit spending and at the end of 2013 the state debt rose up to 7.219 billion euro, representing 18.1% of the GDP. In 2015, the debt rate increased further to 26.7% of the GDP, still remaining the third lowest in EU after Estonia and Luxembourg. Part of the increase was driven by the collapse of Corporate Commercial Bank in 2014, the fourth largest bank in the country, and the subsequent paying out of guaranteed deposits.

== Foreign economic relations ==
Exports of Bulgaria by product category (2019) Chemical products Transportation Machines Mineral products Plastics and rubbers Metals Foodstuffs Precious metals Textiles Instruments Animal products Vegetable products Paper goods Footwear and headwear Miscellaneous Stone and glass Wood products Animal and vegetable bi-products Animal hides Arts and antiques Weapons

In the 1990s, Bulgaria moved gradually away from dependence on markets in the former Soviet sphere, increasing its exports to the European Union (EU). In 1999, Bulgaria joined the Central European Free-Trade Agreement (CEFTA), with whose members (Croatia, the Czech Republic, Hungary, Poland, Romania, Slovakia, and Slovenia; Macedonia was added in 2006) it has established important trade relations. The admission of all but Croatia and Romania to the EU in 2004 reduced the significance of CEFTA trade, however. In 2004, some 54 percent of Bulgaria's import trade and 58 percent of its export trade was with EU member countries. Bulgaria has bilateral free-trade agreements with Albania, Croatia, Estonia, Israel, Latvia, Lithuania, Macedonia, Moldova, and Turkey.

In the early 2000s, hydrocarbon fuels remained an important import, although beginning in the late 1990s those commodities' share of total imports decreased significantly, from 29 percent in 1996 to 13 percent in 2004. During that period, the diversification of imported products improved as the volume of machinery and equipment, consumer products, and automobiles increased. A large percentage of imports is accounted for by raw materials such as cloth, metal ore, and petroleum, which are processed and re-exported. The most important imports in 2005 were machinery and equipment, metals and ores, chemicals and plastics, fuels, and minerals. The major sources of imports, in order of volume, were Germany, Russia, Italy, Turkey, and Greece. In 2005, Bulgaria's largest export markets, in order of volume, were Italy, Germany, Turkey, Greece, and Belgium. The most important export commodities were clothing, footwear, iron and steel, machinery and equipment, and fuels. In 2005, Bulgaria's exports totaled US$11.7 billion and its imports totaled US$15.9 billion, incurring a trade deficit of US$4.2 billion. The trade deficit is especially severe with Russia, where markets for Bulgarian goods have shrunk drastically in the early 2000s.

In the first half of 2006, Bulgaria had a current account deficit of US$2.3 billion, a substantial increase over the deficit for the same period of 2005, which was some US$1.4 billion. Its trade deficit was US$2.78 billion, foreign direct investment totaled US$1.8 billion, and the financial account balance was US$2.29 billion. In mid-2006, the overall balance of payments was US$883 million, compared with US$755 million for the same period of 2005.

Bulgaria's large foreign debt has been an economic burden throughout the postcommunist era. At the end of 2005, Bulgaria reported an external debt of US$15.2 billion, an increase in value but a decrease as a percentage of gross domestic product (GDP) compared with 2002 and previous years. As a percentage of GDP, the external debt remained constant between 2004 and 2005.

Beginning in the late 1990s, investment from the West and from Russia has contributed significantly to recovery from the economic crisis of 1996–97, but the rate of investment has remained lower than that in other countries of Eastern Europe. In 2003, the largest national sources of foreign direct investment, in order of volume, were Austria, Greece, Germany, Italy, and the Netherlands. In 1997, the Belgian Solve company bought the Deny Soda Combine, and in 1999 LUKoil of Russia bought the Neftochim Oil Refinery at Burgas. Union Minière, a Belgian mining company, bought the large Pirdop copper-smelting plant, giving an important boost to Bulgarian nonferrous metallurgy. A number of foreign companies have invested in the chemical fertilizer and food-processing industries in the early 2000s, China invested in the Bulgarian electronics industry. Some cooperative agreements have been made for the manufacture of vehicle components. Daimler-Chrysler of Germany has a contract to update Bulgaria's military transport vehicles between 2003 and 2015. The French Eurocopter company has a bilateral protocol involving a variety of machinery, computer software, and other industrial products. In 2004, Bulgarian oil reserves attracted interest from Melrose Resources of Edinburgh. Russia's natural gas giant, Gazprom, has pledged investment in Bulgaria's natural gas infrastructure in exchange for increased purchase of its product. A three-company Israeli consortium agreed in 2004 to work with the domestic Overgas company (which is half-owned by Gazprom) on a major natural-gas distribution network in Bulgaria. In 2005 three European consortia submitted bids for construction of the Belene nuclear power plant. One such investor is the Italian ENEL energy consortium, which also owns the Maritsa–Iztok–3 thermal power plant. In 2006 Russia's Gazprom company bid against several European energy companies for ownership of newly privatized regional heating utilities, and the Austrian Petromaxx Energy Group invested US$120 million in a new oil refinery at Silistra.

In December 1996, Bulgaria joined the World Trade Organization. In the early 1990s Bulgaria's slow pace of privatization, contradictory government tax and investment policies, and bureaucratic red tape kept foreign investment among the lowest in the region. Total direct foreign investment from 1991 through 1996 was $831 million. In the years since 1997, however, Bulgaria has begun to attract substantial foreign investment. In 2004 alone, over 2.72 billion Euro (3.47 billion US dollars) were invested by foreign companies. In 2005, economists observed a slowdown to about 1.8 billion euros (2.3 billion US dollars) in FDI which is attributed mainly to the end of the privatization of the major state-owned companies. After joining the EU in 2007, Bulgaria registered a peak in foreign investment of about 6 billion euros.

== Miscellaneous data ==
Bulgarian households with Internet access at home

The data on ICT usage in households and by individuals are based on an annual sample survey, which is part of the European Community Statistical Programme. The methodology and the statistical tools are completely harmonized to Eurostat requirements and Regulation No.808/2004 of the European Parliament and the council. The aim of the survey is to collect and disseminate reliable and comparable information on the use of Information and Communication Technologies in households at European level and covers the following subjects:

- access to and use of ICT systems by individuals and/or in households;
- use of the internet for different purposes by individuals and/or in households;
- ICT security;
- ICT competence;
- e-Commerce;
- barriers to use of ICT and the internet;
- perceived effects of ICT usage on individuals and/or in households.

	2014	2015	2016	2017	2018	2019
Total	56,7%	59,1%	63,5%	67,3%	72,1%	75,1%
By statistical region
Severozapaden	44,9%	44,9%	58,6%	57,8	65,2%	70,8%
Severen tsentralen	58,5%	58,2%	61,5%	67,8	68,5%	73,2%
Severoiztochen	56,2%	56,5%	67,3%	68,7	73,9%	74,0%
Yugoiztochen	52,3%	58,6%	60,9%	62,1	70,0%	74,7%
Yugozapaden	63,7%	67,8%	64,9%	70,5	75,3%	77,8%
Yuzhen tsentralen	54,8%	56,6	64,9%	70,4	73,7%	75,3%
By type of connection
Narrowband connection	1,9%	1,9%	4,1%	2,3	2,6%	1,5%
Dial-up or ISDN	0,3%	0,4%	0,5%	0,7	0,4%	0,5%
Mobile narrowband connection (WAP, GPRS)	1,6%	1,7%	3,6%	1,8	2,3%	1,3%
Broadband connection	56,5%	58,8%	62,8%	66,9	71,5%	74,9%
Fixed broadband connections, e.g. DSL, ADSL, VDSL, cable, optical fibre, satellite, public WiFi connections	54,0%	55,5%	56,7%	58,7	57,9%	57,8%
Mobile broadband connections (via mobile phone network, at least 3G, e.g. 2G+/GPRS, using (SIM) card or USB key, mobile phone or smart phone as modem)	14,0%	22,9%	33,1%	46,4	58,8%	64,0%

== See also ==
- List of Bulgarian provinces by GDP
- Bulgarian National Bank
- Bulgarian Stock Exchange
- Economy of Europe
