= List of Bulgarian provinces by GDP =

This is a list of Bulgarian provinces and the capital city of Sofia by GDP

== List of provinces by GDP ==
Provinces by GDP in 2020 according to data by Eurostat.

Rank	Province	GDP in mil Bulgarian lev	GDP in mil Euro (PPP)
1	Sofia (City)	51,351	48,942
2	Plovdiv	9,813	9,353
3	Varna	7,381	7,035
4	Stara Zagora	5,068	4,830
5	Burgas	4,661	4,422
6	Sofia Province	4,096	3,902
7	Blagoevgrad	3,266	3,113
8	Pazardzhik	2,772	2,642
9	Ruse	2,768	2,639
10	Veliko Tarnovo	2,617	2,495
11	Vratsa	2,472	2,357
12	Pleven	2,385	2,273
13	Haskovo	2,060	1,963
14	Shumen	1,792	1,708
15	Dobrich	1,783	1,700
16	Kardzhali	1,766	1,683
17	Gabrovo	1,570	1,497
18	Sliven	1,538	1,466
19	Lovech	1,361	1,297
20	Montana	1,290	1,230
21	Yambol	1,232	1,174
22	Smolyan	1,229	1,172
23	Targovishte	1,207	1,150
24	Razgrad	1,172	1,117
25	Kyustendil	1,160	1,105
26	Pernik	1,130	1,077
27	Silistra	883	841
28	Vidin	726	691
	Bulgaria	120,553	114,897

== List of provinces by GDP per capita ==
Provinces by GDP per capita in 2020 according to data by Eurostat.

Rank	Province	GDP per capita in Euro (PPP)	Percent of EU27 average (PPP)
1	Sofia (City)	37,100	124
2	Sofia Province	16,800	56
3	Stara Zagora	15,500	51
4	Varna	15,000	50
5	Vratsa	14,900	49
6	Gabrovo	14,100	47
7	Plovdiv	14,000	47
8	Ruse	12,300	41
9	Smolyan	11,400	38
10	Veliko Tarnovo	10,800	36
11	Burgas	10,800	36
12	Lovech	10,600	35
13	Kardzhali	10,600	35
14	Pazardzhik	10,500	35
15	Targovishte	10,400	35
16	Blagoevgrad	10,300	35
17	Razgrad	10,100	34
18	Yambol	10,000	33
19	Dobrich	9,900	33
20	Shumen	9,900	33
21	Montana	9,700	32
22	Pleven	9,700	32
23	Kyustendil	9,500	32
24	Pernik	9,000	30
25	Haskovo	8,700	29
26	Vidin	8,400	28
27	Sliven	8,000	27
28	Silistra	7,800	26
	Bulgaria	16,600	55
