= Eliseyna =

Coordinates: 43°04′40″N 23°29′24″E

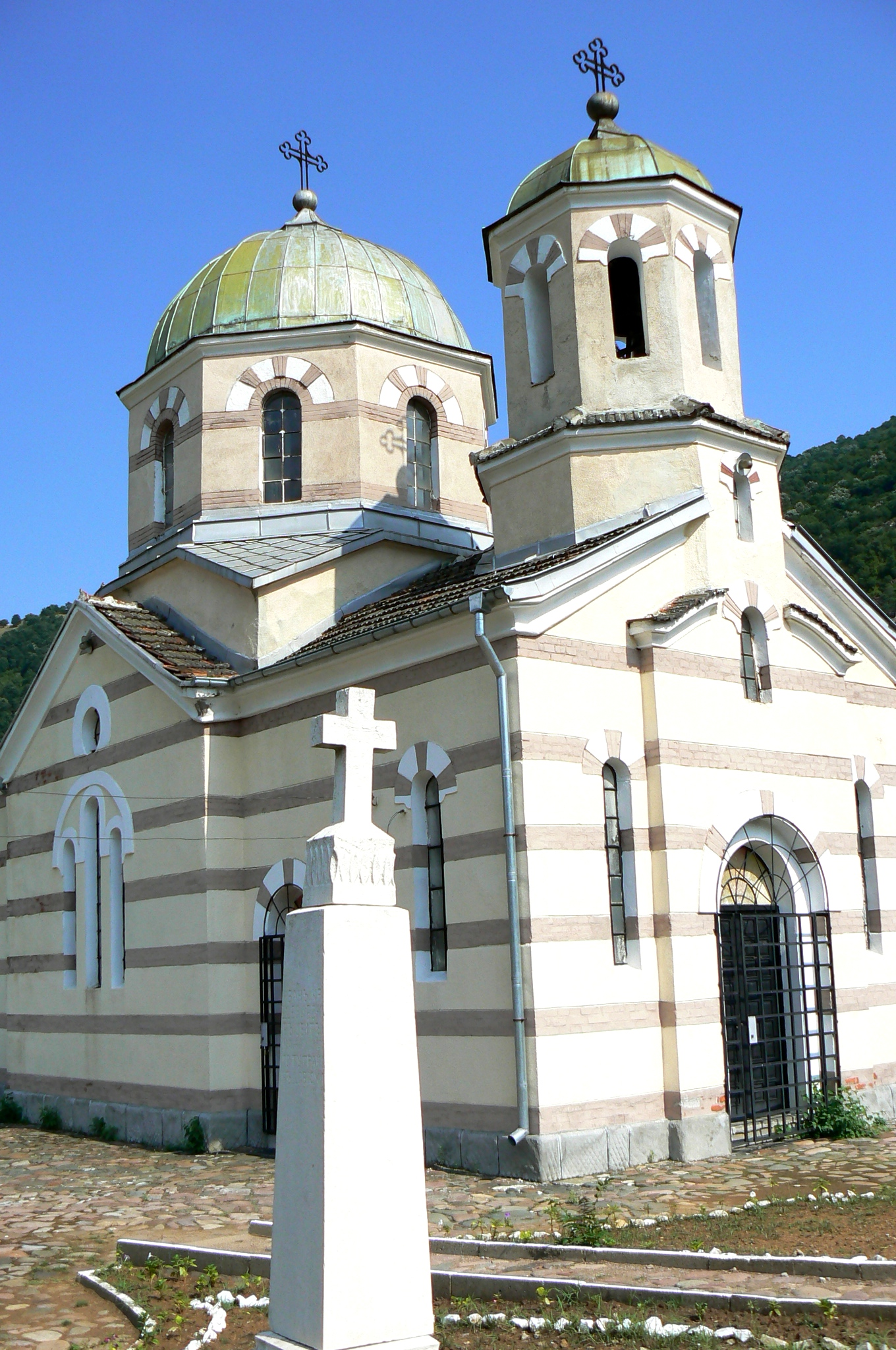
Eliseyna-church

Eliseina (Bulgarian: Елисейна) is a village in Mezdra Municipality in Vratsa Province, northwestern Bulgaria. As of 2015 it has 390 inhabitants. The village is situated on the northern slopes of Stara Planina in a region rich in copper, lead, and zinc deposits. There is a small copper smelter near the village.
