= Bulgarian Dreams =

- Company type: Private (Limited liability)
- Founded: 2003
- Defunct: 2008
- Fate: Ceased trading
- Headquarters: Suite 458, 2 Lansdowne Row, London, W1J 6HL, UK
- Key people: Robert Jenkin; Mariya Georgieva; David Smith
- Website: www.bulgariandreams.com

Bulgarian Dreams was a UK-registered property sales agent, specialising in the sale of off plan properties in Bulgaria to buyers mainly from the UK and Ireland. The company announced in December 2008 that it had ceased trading.

Bulgarian Dreams operated from several offices with headquarters at 120 Moorgate, London, UK, EC2M 6SS - now closed

== History ==
=== Early success ===
Bulgarian Dreams sold off plan properties in Bulgaria, marketing the country as an up-and-coming destination with a rapidly developing economy and growing tourist trade. The company was well regarded and won International Residential Property Awards for Real Estate Agency in three consecutive years 2004-2006 including Best Real Estate Agency, Best Property in Bulgaria, Best Property Website and Best Development in Bulgaria from 2004 through to 2006.

The company received widespread news coverage.

=== Ceasing Trading ===
The London office closed around the end of 2008 but the Sofia office remains open and in contact with clients. The Bulgarian Dreams website was replaced in early 2009 with a statement from the company stating that they had decided to cease trading due to prevailing economic conditions. Customers were instructed to liaise directly with the developers of their properties.

== Customer complaints and adverse publicity ==
Bulgarian Dreams has received negative media coverage, with customer dissatisfaction gaining pace through 2008 and into 2009. Buyers have complained that the properties they have paid for (either in part or in full) were left incomplete, or delayed due to financial problems and/or planning permission issues.

The BBC’s consumer affairs programme Watchdog featured a story on Bulgarian Dreams which aired on 9 February 2009 in the UK. This highlighted the problems experienced by one buyer who purchased an apartment at the Windows To Paradise development on the Black Sea coast being built by the development company Interlink. It was noted that Robert Jenkin had been a director of the company until November 2006.

Watchdog broadcast an update to the story the following week, on 16 February 2009. This featured more dissatisfied customers.

Bulgarian Dreams declined to be interviewed on air but issued the following statement:

"The decision to close the London sales and marketing office of Berkeley Square Trading Limited t/a Bulgarian Dreams doesn't mean that the company isn't committed to providing ongoing customer support services to clients who've purchased developments in Bulgaria where it's able to do so. Clients are aware of the telephone number and email address where ongoing queries can be addressed. Bulgarian Dreams will answer such queries if they're addressed to the Company directly, but it's not prepared to discuss individuals' issues on air."

Robert Jenkin was interviewed with Chris Dale in Sofia by Watchdog with whom he had been liaising. The interview largely focused on the Windows To Paradise development. This meeting was featured in a Watchdog programme which aired on 18 May 2009 in the UK.

At the meeting Robert Jenkin explained that Windows To Paradise had run into difficulties due to a cash-flow problem at the development company, that building costs had been higher than expected and that the global slowdown had hit sales. Additionally a number of purchasers hadn't paid their final payments and that these funds could be used to fund completion of the properties. He said that following these problems he and his customers were now moving forward. "Myself and the owners, we're talking about the majority of owners in many developments now, we've put that behind us, we've drawn a line in the sand." When asked about his connections with the development company Interlink, Robert Jenkin stated that he'd once been a manager (until 2006) and that his wife was still a manager, but he explained that these appointments were non-executive and made to allow Bulgarian Dreams to have access to increased information flow on behalf of purchasers.

It was reported in the interview that a new structure was being proposed to move the development to completion but that if this failed it was likely that the properties would be auctioned off in relation to an outstanding loan due by the development company.

== Related companies ==
Bulgarian Dreams also operated a sister company called Go Visit Bulgaria (rentals).
