= March 1 =

March 1 this year in various calendars
- Sunday, 1 March 2026
Akan	Nwonakwasi
Armenian	14 Areg 1475
Aztec	Tecuilhuitontli 10, 12 Tecpatl
Babylonian	11 Shabatu, 2336 SE
Balinese pawukon	Menga, Beteng, Laba, Paing, Aryang, Redite of Ugu, Brahma, Jangur, Sri
Bengali	16 Falgun, BS 1432
Chinese	Yang Wood Dog・Star Mansion; Fire Horse Year, Month 1, Day 13 (Yushui, 4 days until Jingzhe)
Common Era	1 March 2026 CE
Coptic	22 Meshir, AM 1742
Egyptian	19 Epiphi, 2774 NE
Ethiopian	22 Yakātit, 2018 Amätä Məhrät
French Republican	Décade II, Primidi de Ventôse de l'Année 234 de la République
Gregorian	1 March, AD 2026
Hebrew	12 Adar, AM 5786
Hindu	Puṣya・Śobhana; Solar: 17 Phālguna, 1947 SE; Lunisolar: Trayodaśī, Śukla pakṣa of Phālguna, 2082 VE; Rāudra・5126 KY・1,872,635
Icelandic	Sunnudagur, 8 Góa 2025
Islamic	12 Ramadan, AH 1447 (using tabular method)
ISO week date	2026-W09-7
Japanese	13 Mutsuki, Reiwa 8 (Usui, 4 days until Keichitsu)
Julian	16 February, AD 2026 (AM 7534)
Julian day	2461101
Korean	13 Horangidal, 4359 DE
Maya	13.0.13.6.18; 16 Kayab, 12 Etznab
Roman	ante diem XIV Kalendas Martias, MMDCCLXXIX AUC
Solar Hijri	10 Esfand, SH 1404
Tibetan	13 mchu, me pho rta 2153 or 1772 or 1000

<<	March					>>
Su	Mo	Tu	We	Th	Fr	Sa
1	2	3	4	5	6	7
8	9	10	11	12	13	14
15	16	17	18	19	20	21
22	23	24	25	26	27	28
29	30	31
2026

March 1 in recent years
2026 (Sunday)
2025 (Saturday)
2024 (Friday)
2023 (Wednesday)
2022 (Tuesday)
2021 (Monday)
2020 (Sunday)
2019 (Friday)
2018 (Thursday)
2017 (Wednesday)

March 1 is the 60th day of the year (61st in leap years) in the Gregorian calendar; 305 days remain until the end of the year.

== Events ==
=== Pre-1600 ===
- 509 BC – Publius Valerius Publicola celebrates the first triumph of the Roman Republic after his victory over the deposed king Lucius Tarquinius Superbus at the Battle of Silva Arsia.
- 293 – Emperor Diocletian and Maximian appoint Constantius Chlorus and Galerius as Caesars. This is considered the beginning of the Tetrarchy, known as the Quattuor Principes Mundi ("Four Rulers of the World").
- 350 – Vetranio proclaims himself Caesar after being encouraged to do so by Constantina, sister of Constantius II.
- 834 – Emperor Louis the Pious is restored as sole ruler of the Frankish Empire.
- 1290 - University of Coimbra, in Portugal, is officially chartered by King Denis.
- 1476 – Forces of the Catholic Monarchs engage the combined Portuguese-Castilian armies of Afonso V and Prince John at the Battle of Toro.
- 1562 – Sixty-three Huguenots are massacred in Wassy, France, marking the start of the French Wars of Religion.

=== 1601–1900 ===
- 1628 – Writs issued in February by Charles I of England mandate that every county in England (not just seaport towns) pay ship tax by this date.
- 1633 – Samuel de Champlain reclaims his role as commander of New France on behalf of Cardinal Richelieu.
- 1692 – Sarah Good, Sarah Osborne, and Tituba are brought before local magistrates in Salem Village, Massachusetts, beginning what would become known as the Salem witch trials.
- 1781 – The Articles of Confederation goes into effect in the United States.
- 1796 – The Dutch East India Company is nationalized by the Batavian Republic.
- 1805 – Justice Samuel Chase is acquitted at the end of his impeachment trial before the U.S. Senate.
- 1811 – Leaders of the Mamluk dynasty are killed by Egyptian ruler Muhammad Ali.
- 1815 – Napoleon returns to France from his banishment on Elba.
- 1836 – A convention of delegates from 57 Texas communities convenes in Washington-on-the-Brazos, Texas, to deliberate independence from Mexico.
- 1845 – United States President John Tyler signs a bill authorizing the United States to annex the Republic of Texas.
- 1867 – Nebraska is admitted as the 37th U.S. state.
- 1870 – Marshal F. S. López dies during the Battle of Cerro Corá thus marking the end of the Paraguayan War.
- 1871 – The victorious Prussian Army parades through Paris, France, after the end of the Siege of Paris during the Franco-Prussian War.
- 1872 – Yellowstone National Park is established as the world's first national park.
- 1893 – Electrical engineer Nikola Tesla gives the first public demonstration of radio in St. Louis, Missouri.
- 1896 – Battle of Adwa: An Ethiopian army defeats an outnumbered Italian force, ending the First Italo-Ethiopian War.
- 1896 – Henri Becquerel discovers radioactive decay.

=== 1901–present ===
- 1901 – The Australian Army is formed.
- 1910 – The deadliest avalanche in United States history buries a Great Northern Railway train in northeastern King County, Washington, killing 96 people.
- 1914 – China joins the Universal Postal Union.
- 1917 – The Zimmermann Telegram is reprinted in newspapers across the United States after the U.S. government releases its unencrypted text.
- 1919 – March 1st Movement begins in Korea under Japanese rule.
- 1921 – The Australian cricket team captained by Warwick Armstrong becomes the first team to complete a whitewash of The Ashes, something that would not be repeated for 86 years.
- 1921 – Following mass protests in Petrograd demanding greater freedom in the RSFSR, the Kronstadt rebellion begins, with sailors and citizens taking up arms against the Bolsheviks.
- 1932 – Aviator Charles Lindbergh's 20-month-old son Charles Jr is kidnapped from his home in East Amwell, New Jersey. His body would not be found until May 12.
- 1939 – An Imperial Japanese Army ammunition dump explodes at Hirakata, Osaka, Japan, killing 94.
- 1941 – World War II: Bulgaria signs the Tripartite Pact, allying itself with the Axis powers.
- 1942 – World War II: Japanese forces land on Java, the main island of the Dutch East Indies, at Merak and Banten Bay (Banten), Eretan Wetan (Indramayu) and Kragan (Rembang).
- 1946 – The Bank of England is nationalised.
- 1947 – The International Monetary Fund begins financial operations.
- 1950 – Cold War: Klaus Fuchs is convicted of spying for the Soviet Union by disclosing top secret atomic bomb data.
- 1953 – Soviet Premier Joseph Stalin suffers a stroke and collapses; he dies four days later.
- 1954 – Nuclear weapons testing: The Castle Bravo, a 15-megaton hydrogen bomb, is detonated on Bikini Atoll in the Pacific Ocean, resulting in the worst radioactive contamination ever caused by the United States.
- 1954 – Armed Puerto Rican nationalists attack the United States Capitol building, injuring five Representatives.
- 1956 – The International Air Transport Association finalizes a draft of the Radiotelephony spelling alphabet for the International Civil Aviation Organization.
- 1956 – Formation of the East German Nationale Volksarmee.
- 1958 – Samuel Alphonsus Stritch is appointed Pro-Prefect of the Propagation of Faith and thus becomes the first U.S. member of the Roman Curia.
- 1961 – Uganda becomes self-governing and holds its first elections.
- 1962 – American Airlines Flight 1 crashes into Jamaica Bay in New York, killing 95.
- 1964 – Villarrica Volcano begins a strombolian eruption causing lahars that destroy half of the town of Coñaripe.
- 1964 – Paradise Airlines Flight 901A crashes near Lake Tahoe, Nevada, killing 85.
- 1966 – Venera 3 Soviet space probe crashes on Venus becoming the first spacecraft to land on another planet's surface.
- 1966 – The Ba'ath Party takes power in Syria.
- 1971 – President of Pakistan Yahya Khan indefinitely postpones the pending national assembly session, precipitating massive civil disobedience in East Pakistan.
- 1973 – Black September storms the Saudi embassy in Khartoum, Sudan, resulting in the assassination of three Western hostages.
- 1974 – Watergate scandal: Seven are indicted for their role in the Watergate break-in and charged with conspiracy to obstruct justice.
- 1981 – Provisional Irish Republican Army member Bobby Sands begins his hunger strike in HM Prison Maze.
- 1990 – Steve Jackson Games is raided by the United States Secret Service, prompting the later formation of the Electronic Frontier Foundation.
- 1991 – Uprisings against Saddam Hussein begin in Iraq, leading to the deaths of more than 25,000 people, mostly civilians.
- 1992 – Bosnia and Herzegovina declares its independence from Socialist Federal Republic of Yugoslavia.
- 1998 – Titanic becomes the first film to gross over $1 billion worldwide.
- 2002 – U.S. invasion of Afghanistan: Operation Anaconda begins in eastern Afghanistan.
- 2002 – The Envisat environmental satellite successfully launches aboard an Ariane 5 rocket to reach an orbit of 800 km (500 mi) above the Earth, which was the then-largest payload at 10.5 m long and with a diameter of 4.57 m.
- 2002 – Space Shuttle Columbia is launched on STS-109 to service the Hubble Space Telescope.
- 2003 – Management of the United States Customs Service and the United States Secret Service moves to the United States Department of Homeland Security.
- 2005 – In Roper v. Simmons, the U.S. Supreme Court rules that the execution of juveniles found guilty of any crime is unconstitutional.
- 2006 – English-language Wikipedia reaches its one millionth article, Jordanhill railway station.
- 2007 – Tornadoes break out across the southern United States, killing at least 20 people, including eight at Enterprise High School.
- 2008 – The Armenian police clash with peaceful opposition rally protesting against allegedly fraudulent presidential elections; as a result ten people are killed.
- 2014 – Thirty-five people are killed and 143 injured in a mass stabbing at Kunming Railway Station in China.

== Births ==
=== Pre-1600 ===
- 1105 – Alfonso VII, king of León and Castile (died 1157)
- 1389 – Antoninus of Florence, Italian archbishop and saint (died 1459)
- 1432 – Isabella of Coimbra (died 1455)
- 1456 – Vladislaus II of Hungary (died 1516)
- 1547 – Rudolph Goclenius, German philosopher and lexicographer (died 1628)
- 1554 – William Stafford, English courtier and conspirator (died 1612)
- 1577 – Richard Weston, 1st Earl of Portland (died 1635)
- 1597 – Jean-Charles della Faille, Flemish priest and mathematician (died 1652)

=== 1601–1900 ===
- 1611 – John Pell, English mathematician and linguist (died 1685)
- 1629 – Abraham Teniers, Flemish painter (died 1670)
- 1647 – John de Brito, Portuguese Jesuit missionary and martyr (died 1693)
- 1657 – Samuel Werenfels, Swiss theologian and author (died 1740)
- 1683 – Tsangyang Gyatso, sixth Dalai Lama (died 1706)
- 1683 – Caroline of Ansbach, British queen and regent (died 1737)
- 1724 – Manuel do Cenáculo, Portuguese prelate and antiquarian (died 1814)
- 1732 – William Cushing, American lawyer and judge (died 1810)
- 1760 – François Buzot, French lawyer and politician (died 1794)
- 1769 – François Séverin Marceau-Desgraviers, French general (died 1796)
- 1807 – Wilford Woodruff, American religious leader, 4th President of The Church of Jesus Christ of Latter-day Saints (died 1898)
- 1810 – Frédéric Chopin, Polish pianist and composer (died 1849)
- 1812 – Augustus Pugin, English architect, co-designed the Palace of Westminster (died 1852)
- 1817 – Giovanni Duprè, Italian sculptor and educator (died 1882)
- 1821 – Joseph Hubert Reinkens, German bishop and academic (died 1896)
- 1835 – Philip Fysh, English-Australian politician, 12th Premier of Tasmania (died 1919)
- 1835 – Matthias Joseph Scheeben, German Catholic priest (died 1888)
- 1837 – William Dean Howells, American novelist, playwright, and critic (died 1920)
- 1842 – Nikolaos Gyzis, Greek painter and academic (died 1901)
- 1848 – Augustus Saint-Gaudens, Irish-American sculptor and academic (died 1907)
- 1852 – Théophile Delcassé, French politician, French Minister of Foreign Affairs (died 1923)
- 1863 – Alexander Golovin, Russian painter and set designer (died 1930)
- 1870 – E. M. Antoniadi, Greek-French astronomer and academic (died 1944)
- 1876 – Henri de Baillet-Latour, Belgian businessman (died 1942)
- 1880 – Lytton Strachey, British writer and critic (died 1932)
- 1886 – Oskar Kokoschka, Austrian-Swiss painter, poet, and playwright (died 1980)
- 1888 – Ewart Astill, English cricketer and billiards player (died 1948)
- 1888 – Fanny Walden, English cricketer and umpire, international footballer (died 1949)
- 1889 – Tetsuro Watsuji, Japanese historian and philosopher (died 1960)
- 1890 – Theresa Bernstein, Polish-American painter and author (died 2002)
- 1891 – Ralph Hitz, Austrian-American hotelier (died 1940)
- 1892 – Ryūnosuke Akutagawa, Japanese author and educator (died 1927)
- 1893 – Mercedes de Acosta, American author, poet, and playwright (died 1968)
- 1896 – Dimitri Mitropoulos, Greek pianist, composer, and conductor (died 1960)
- 1896 – Moriz Seeler, German playwright and producer (died 1942)
- 1899 – Erich von dem Bach-Zelewski, German SS officer (died 1972)
- 1900 – Basil Bunting, British poet (died 1985)

=== 1901–present ===
- 1904 – Paul Hartman, American actor, singer, and dancer (died 1973)
- 1904 – Glenn Miller, American trombonist, composer, and bandleader (died 1944)
- 1905 – Doris Hare, Welsh-English actress, singer, and dancer (died 2000)
- 1906 – Phạm Văn Đồng, Vietnamese lieutenant and politician, 2nd Prime Minister of Vietnam (died 2000)
- 1909 – Eugene Esmonde, English lieutenant and pilot (died 1942)
- 1909 – Winston Sharples, American pianist and composer (died 1978)
- 1910 – Archer John Porter Martin, English chemist and academic, Nobel Prize laureate (died 2002)
- 1910 – David Niven, English soldier and actor (died 1983)
- 1912 – Gerald Emmett Carter, Canadian cardinal (died 2003)
- 1912 – Boris Chertok, Polish-Russian engineer and academic (died 2011)
- 1914 – Harry Caray, American sportscaster (died 1998)
- 1914 – Ralph Ellison, American novelist and literary critic (died 1994)
- 1917 – Robert Lowell, American poet (died 1977)
- 1917 – Dinah Shore, American singer and actress (died 1994)
- 1918 – João Goulart, Brazilian lawyer and politician, 24th President of Brazil (died 1976)
- 1918 – Gladys Spellman, American educator and politician (died 1988)
- 1920 – Max Bentley, Canadian ice hockey player (died 1984)
- 1920 – Howard Nemerov, American poet and academic (died 1991)
- 1921 – Cameron Argetsinger, American race car driver and lawyer (died 2008)
- 1921 – Terence Cooke, American cardinal (died 1983)
- 1921 – Richard Wilbur, American poet, translator, and essayist (died 2017)
- 1922 – William Gaines, American publisher (died 1992)
- 1922 – Yitzhak Rabin, Israeli general and politician, 5th Prime Minister of Israel, Nobel Prize laureate (died 1995)
- 1922 – Fred Scolari, American basketball player (died 2002)
- 1924 – Arnold Drake, American author and screenwriter (died 2007)
- 1924 – Deke Slayton, American soldier, pilot, and astronaut (died 1993)
- 1926 – Robert Clary, French-American actor and author (died 2022)
- 1926 – Cesare Danova, Italian-American actor (died 1992)
- 1926 – Pete Rozelle, American businessman and 3rd National Football League Commissioner (died 1996)
- 1926 – Allan Stanley, Canadian ice hockey player and coach (died 2013)
- 1927 – George O. Abell, American astronomer, academic, and skeptic (died 1983)
- 1927 – Harry Belafonte, American singer-songwriter and actor (died 2023)
- 1927 – Robert Bork, American lawyer and scholar, United States Attorney General (died 2012)
- 1928 – Jacques Rivette, French director, screenwriter, and critic (died 2016)
- 1929 – Georgi Markov, Bulgarian journalist and author (died 1978)
- 1930 – Monu Mukhopadhyay, Indian Bengali actor (died 2020)
- 1930 – Gastone Nencini, Italian cyclist (died 1980)
- 1934 – Jean-Michel Folon, Belgian painter and sculptor (died 2005)
- 1934 – Joan Hackett, American actress (died 1983)
- 1935 – Robert Conrad, American actor, radio host and stuntman (died 2020)
- 1936 – Jean-Edern Hallier, French author (died 1997)
- 1939 – Leo Brouwer, Cuban guitarist, composer, and conductor
- 1939 – Mustansar Hussain Tarar, Pakistani author
- 1940 – Robin Gray, Australian politician, 37th Premier of Tasmania
- 1940 – Robert Grossman, American painter, sculptor, and author (died 2018)
- 1941 – Robert Hass, American poet
- 1941 – Dave Marcis, American stock car racing driver
- 1942 – Richard Myers, American general
- 1943 – Gil Amelio, American businessman
- 1943 – José Ángel Iribar, Spanish footballer and manager
- 1943 – Rashid Sunyaev, Russian-German astronomer and physicist
- 1944 – Buddhadeb Bhattacharjee, Indian politician, 7th Chief Minister of West Bengal
- 1944 – John Breaux, American lawyer and politician
- 1944 – Mike d'Abo, English singer
- 1944 – Roger Daltrey, English singer-songwriter, producer, and actor
- 1945 – Dirk Benedict, American actor and director
- 1946 – Gerry Boulet, Canadian singer-songwriter (died 1990)
- 1946 – Jim Crace, English author and academic
- 1947 – Alan Thicke, Canadian-American actor and composer (died 2016)
- 1951 – Sergei Kourdakov, Russian-American KGB agent (died 1973)
- 1952 – Dave Barr, Canadian golfer
- 1952 – Nevada Barr, American actress and author
- 1952 – Janice Burgess, American television executive, screenwriter, and producer (died 2024)
- 1952 – Leigh Matthews, Australian footballer, coach, and sportscaster
- 1952 – Jerri Nielsen, American physician and explorer (died 2009)
- 1952 – Martin O'Neill, Northern Irish footballer and manager
- 1952 – Brian Winters, American basketball player and coach
- 1953 – Sinan Çetin, Turkish actor, director, and producer
- 1953 – Carlos Queiroz, Portuguese footballer and manager
- 1953 – M. K. Stalin, Indian Tamil politician, 8th and incumbent Chief Minister of Tamil Nadu
- 1954 – Ron Howard, American actor, director, and producer
- 1955 – Catherine Bach, American actress
- 1955 – Vice Admiral Sir Timothy Laurence, member of the British royal family and Royal Navy officer
- 1956 – Tim Daly, American actor, director, and producer
- 1956 – Dalia Grybauskaitė, Lithuanian politician, 8th President of Lithuania
- 1958 – Nik Kershaw, English singer-songwriter, guitarist, and producer
- 1958 – Wayne B. Phillips, Australian cricketer and coach
- 1958 – Bertrand Piccard, Swiss psychiatrist and aviator
- 1959 – Nick Griffin, English politician
- 1961 – Mike Rozier, American football player
- 1963 – Bryan Batt, American actor
- 1963 – Ron Francis, Canadian ice hockey player and manager
- 1963 – Magnus Svensson, Swedish ice hockey player
- 1963 – Russell Wong, American actor
- 1965 – Booker T, American professional wrestler and sportscaster
- 1965 – Chris Eigeman, American actor, director, screenwriter, and producer
- 1965 – Stewart Elliott, Canadian jockey
- 1966 – Don Lemon, American journalist
- 1966 – Zack Snyder, American director, producer, and screenwriter
- 1967 – George Eads, American actor
- 1967 – Aron Winter, Surinamese-Dutch footballer and manager
- 1969 – Javier Bardem, Spanish actor and producer
- 1970 – Yolanda Griffith, American basketball player and coach
- 1971 – Ma Dong-seok, South Korean-American actor
- 1971 – Brad Falchuk, American screenwriter, director, and producer
- 1973 – Jack Davenport, English actor
- 1973 – Ryan Peake, Canadian musician and songwriter
- 1973 – Emiliya Vacheva, Bulgarian judoka
- 1973 – Chris Webber, American basketball player and sportscaster
- 1974 – Mark-Paul Gosselaar, American actor
- 1977 – Rens Blom, Dutch pole vaulter
- 1978 – Jensen Ackles, American actor and musician
- 1978 – Donovan Patton, American actor and television host
- 1979 – Mikkel Kessler, Danish boxer
- 1979 – Bruno Langlois, Canadian cyclist
- 1980 – Shahid Afridi, Pakistani cricketer
- 1980 – Sercan Güvenışık, German-Turkish footballer
- 1980 – Djimi Traoré, French-Malian footballer
- 1981 – Will Power, Australian race car driver
- 1982 – Travis Diener, American-Italian basketball player
- 1983 – Daniel Carvalho, Brazilian footballer
- 1983 – Lupita Nyong'o, Kenyan-Mexican actress
- 1984 – Alexander Steen, Canadian-Swedish ice hockey player
- 1984 – Claudio Bieler, Argentinian footballer
- 1985 – Andreas Ottl, German footballer
- 1986 – Big E, American professional wrestler
- 1986 – Jonathan Spector, American soccer player
- 1986 – Alec Utgoff, Ukrainian-English actor
- 1987 – Kesha, American singer-songwriter and actress
- 1987 – Kyle O'Reilly, Canadian professional wrestler
- 1988 – Trevor Cahill, American baseball player
- 1988 – Jarvis Varnado, American basketball player
- 1989 – Tenille Dashwood, Australian professional wrestler
- 1989 – Daniella Monet, American actress
- 1989 – Emeraude Toubia, Canadian-American actress
- 1989 – Carlos Vela, Mexican footballer
- 1991 – Joe Mantiply, American baseball player
- 1992 – Édouard Mendy, Senegalese footballer
- 1992 – Tom Walsh, New Zealand athlete
- 1993 – Juan Bernat, Spanish footballer
- 1993 – Michael Conforto, American baseball player
- 1993 – Josh McEachran, English footballer
- 1993 – Victor Rask, Swedish ice hockey player
- 1993 – Jordan Veretout, French footballer
- 1994 – Justin Bieber, Canadian singer-songwriter
- 1994 – Asanoyama Hiroki, Japanese sumo wrestler
- 1994 – Tyreek Hill, American football player
- 1994 – Maximilian Philipp, German footballer
- 1999 – Oswaldo Cabrera, Venezuelan baseball player
- 1999 – Brogan Hay, Scottish footballer
- 2000 – Ja'Marr Chase, American football player
- 2001 – Wander Franco, Dominican baseball player
- 2001 – Sapnap, American YouTuber

== Deaths ==
=== Pre-1600 ===
- 492 – Felix III, pope of the Catholic Church
- 589 – David, Welsh bishop and saint
- 965 – Leo VIII, pope of the Catholic Church
- 977 – Rudesind, Galician bishop (born 907)
- 991 – En'yū, Japanese emperor (born 959)
- 1058 – Ermesinde of Carcassonne, countess and regent of Barcelona (born 972)
- 1131 – Stephen II, king of Hungary and Croatia (born 1101)
- 1233 – Thomas, count of Savoy (born 1178)
- 1244 – Gruffydd ap Llywelyn Fawr, Welsh noble, son of Llywelyn the Great (born 1200)
- 1320 – Ayurbarwada Buyantu Khan, Chinese emperor (born 1286)
- 1383 – Amadeus VI, count of Savoy (born 1334)
- 1510 – Francisco de Almeida, Portuguese soldier and explorer (born 1450)
- 1546 – George Wishart, Scottish minister and martyr (born 1513)

=== 1601–1900 ===
- 1620 – Thomas Campion, English poet and composer (born 1567)
- 1633 – George Herbert, English poet and orator (born 1593)
- 1643 – Girolamo Frescobaldi, Italian keyboardist and composer (born 1583)
- 1661 – Richard Zouch, English judge and politician (born 1590)
- 1697 – Francesco Redi, Italian physician and poet (born 1626)
- 1734 – Roger North, English lawyer and author (born 1653)
- 1768 – Hermann Samuel Reimarus, German philosopher and author (born 1694)
- 1773 – Luigi Vanvitelli, Italian architect, designed the Palace of Caserta (born 1700)
- 1792 – Leopold II, Holy Roman Emperor (born 1747)
- 1792 – Angelo Emo, Venetian admiral and statesman (born 1731)
- 1841 – Claude-Victor Perrin, Duc de Belluno, French general and politician, French Minister of Defence (born 1764)
- 1862 – Peter Barlow, English mathematician and physicist (born 1776)
- 1875 – Tristan Corbière, French poet and educator (born 1845)
- 1882 – Theodor Kullak, German pianist, composer, and educator (born 1818)
- 1884 – Isaac Todhunter, English mathematician and academic (born 1820)
- 1889 – William Henry Monk, English organist and composer (born 1823)
- 1890 – Rafael Campo, President of El Salvador from 1856 to 1858 (born 1813)

=== 1901–present ===
- 1906 – José María de Pereda, Spanish author (born 1833)
- 1911 – Jacobus Henricus van 't Hoff, Dutch-German chemist and academic, Nobel Prize laureate (born 1852)
- 1914 – Gilbert Elliot-Murray-Kynynmound, 4th Earl of Minto, English soldier and politician, 8th Governor General of Canada (born 1845)
- 1920 – John H. Bankhead, American lawyer and politician (born 1842)
- 1922 – Pichichi, Spanish footballer (born 1892)
- 1925 – Homer Plessy, American political activist (born 1862 or 1863)
- 1932 – Frank Teschemacher, American Jazz musician (born 1906)
- 1936 – Mikhail Kuzmin, Russian author and poet (born 1871)
- 1938 – Gabriele D'Annunzio, Italian journalist and politician (born 1863)
- 1940 – A. H. Tammsaare, Estonian author (born 1878)
- 1942 – George S. Rentz, American commander (born 1882)
- 1943 – Alexandre Yersin, Swiss-French physician and bacteriologist (born 1863)
- 1952 – Mariano Azuela, Mexican physician and author (born 1873)
- 1966 – Fritz Houtermans, Polish-German physicist and academic (born 1903)
- 1974 – Bobby Timmons, American pianist and composer (born 1935)
- 1976 – Jean Martinon, French conductor and composer (born 1910)
- 1978 – Paul Scott, English author, poet, and playwright (born 1920)
- 1979 – Mustafa Barzani, Iraqi-Kurdistan politician (born 1903)
- 1980 – Wilhelmina Cooper, Dutch-American model and businesswoman, founded Wilhelmina Models (born 1940)
- 1980 – Dixie Dean, English footballer (born 1907)
- 1983 – Arthur Koestler, Hungarian-English journalist and author (born 1905)
- 1984 – Jackie Coogan, American actor (born 1914)
- 1988 – Joe Besser, American comedian and actor (born 1907)
- 1989 – Vasantdada Patil, Indian politician, 5th Chief Minister of Maharashtra (born 1917)
- 1991 – Edwin H. Land, American scientist and businessman, co-founded the Polaroid Corporation (born 1909)
- 1993 – Joseph Christopher, American schizophrenic serial killer (born 1955)
- 1995 – César Rodríguez Álvarez, Spanish footballer and manager (born 1920)
- 1995 – Georges J. F. Köhler, German biologist and academic, Nobel Prize laureate (born 1946)
- 1998 – Archie Goodwin, American author and illustrator (born 1937)
- 2004 – Mian Ghulam Jilani, Pakistani general (born 1914)
- 2006 – Peter Osgood, English footballer (born 1947)
- 2006 – Jack Wild, English actor (born 1952)
- 2006 – Nurasyura binte Mohamed Fauzi, Singaporean rape and murder victim (born 2003)
- 2010 – Kristian Digby, English television host and director (born 1977)
- 2012 – Andrew Breitbart, American journalist and publisher (born 1969)
- 2012 – Germano Mosconi, Italian journalist (born 1932)
- 2013 – Bonnie Franklin, American actress, dancer, and singer (born 1944)
- 2014 – Alain Resnais, French director, cinematographer, and screenwriter (born 1922)
- 2015 – Minnie Miñoso, Cuban-American baseball player and coach (born 1922)
- 2016 – Carole Achache, French writer, photographer and actress (born 1952)
- 2018 – María Rubio, Mexican television, film and stage actress (born 1934)
- 2019 – Mike Willesee, Australian journalist and producer (born 1942)
- 2020 – Jack Welch, American business executive (born 1935)
- 2023 – Just Fontaine, French footballer (born 1933)
- 2024 – Iris Apfel, American businesswoman, interior designer, and philanthropist (born 1921)
- 2024 – Akira Toriyama, Japanese manga artist (born 1955)
- 2025 – Pat Ingoldsby, Irish poet and television presenter (born 1942)
- 2025 – Joey Molland, English singer-songwriter and guitarist (born 1947)
- 2025 – Angie Stone, American singer, songwriter, and actress (born 1961)

== Holidays and observances ==
- Beer Day, marked the end of beer prohibition in 1989 (Iceland)
- Chalandamarz, traditional Alpine spring festival (Switzerland)
- Christian feast day:
  - Agnes Tsao Kou Ying (one of the Martyr Saints of China)
  - Albin
  - Eudokia of Heliopolis
  - Pope Felix III
  - Leoluca
  - Luperculus
  - Monan
  - Rudesind
  - Saint David's Day or Dydd Gŵyl Dewi (Wales and Welsh communities)
  - Suitbert
  - March 1 (Eastern Orthodox liturgics)
- Commemoration of Mustafa Barzani's Death (Iraqi Kurdistan)
- Day of the Balearic Islands (Spain)
- Disability Day of Mourning
- Heroes' Day (Paraguay)
- Independence Day, celebrates the independence of Bosnia and Herzegovina from Socialist Federal Republic of Yugoslavia in 1992.
- National "Cursed Soldiers" Remembrance Day (Poland)
- National Pig Day (United States)
- New Year's Day in the more veneto, the calendric system of the Republic of Venice until 1797
- Remembrance Day (Marshall Islands)
- Samiljeol (South Korea)
- Self-injury Awareness Day (international)
- Southeastern Europe celebration of the beginning of spring:
  - Baba Marta Day (Bulgaria)
  - Mărțișor (Romania and Moldova)
- The final day (fourth or fifth) of Ayyám-i-Há (Baháʼí Faith)
- World Seagrass Day
- Yap Day (Yap State)
- Zero Discrimination Day
