= National symbols of Bulgaria =

The national symbols of Bulgaria are the symbols that represent Bulgaria and the Bulgarian people.

== Official symbols ==
Type	Image	Symbol
National flag		Flag of Bulgaria The flag of Bulgaria (Bulgarian: знаме на България, romanized: Zname na Bǎlgarija, [ˈznamɛ nɐ bɐɫˈɡarijɐ]) is a tricolour consisting of three equal-sized horizontal bands of (from top to bottom) white, green, and red. It was first adopted after the Russo-Turkish War (1877–1878), where Bulgaria regained independence. At times, the national flag was charged with the state emblem, especially during the People's Republic of Bulgaria. The current flag was re-established with the 1991 Constitution of Bulgaria and was confirmed in a 1998 law.
Coat of arms		Coat of arms of Bulgaria; The coat of arms of Bulgaria (Bulgarian: Герб на България, [ˈɡɛrp nɐ bɐɫˈɡarijɐ]) consists of a crowned golden lion rampant over a dark red shield; above the shield is the Bulgarian historical crown. The shield is supported by two crowned golden lions rampant; below the shield there is compartment in the shape of oak twigs and white bands with the national motto "Unity makes strength" inscribed on them.
National anthem		Mila Rodino "Mila Rodino" ("Мила Родино" [ˈmiɫɐ ˈrɔdino], translated as "Dear Motherland" or "Dear native land") is the current national anthem of Bulgaria. It is based on the music and text of the song "Gorda Stara Planina" by Tsvetan Radoslavov, written and composed as he left to fight in the Serbo-Bulgarian War in 1885. The anthem was adopted in 1964. The text has been changed many times, most recently in 1990.

== Other symbols ==
Type	Image	Symbol
Cyrillic alphabet		The Cyrillic script /sɪˈrɪlɪk/ is an alphabetic writing system employed across Eastern Europe and north and central Asia. It is based on the Early Cyrillic, which was developed during the First Bulgarian Empire in the 9th century AD at the Preslav Literary School. With the accession of Bulgaria to the European Union on 1 January 2007, Cyrillic became the third official script of the European Union, following the Latin script and Greek script.
Lion (heraldry)		The earliest example of a lion's image as the heraldic symbol of Bulgaria is documented in the Lord Marshal's Roll, composed around 1294 AD and preserved in a copy from about 1640. In its first part under No.15 is represented the coat of arms of Le Rey de Bugrie or the King of Bulgaria, most probably this of Tsar Smilets (1292–1298) or may be some of his recent predecessors. It consists of an argent lion rampant with golden crown over sable shield. In the end of the 14th century an anonymous Arab traveller, who visited the capital of the Second Bulgarian Empire Tarnovo, saw and depicted three lions guardant passant gules painted on the round golden shields carried by the personal guards of Tsar Ivan Shishman (1371–1395). His manuscript is now kept in the National Library of Morocco.
National hero		Vasil Levski (Bulgarian: Васил Левски, originally spelled Василъ Лѣвскій, pronounced [vɐˈsiɫ ˈlɛfski]), born Vasil Ivanov Kunchev (Васил Иванов Кунчев; 18 July 1837 – 18 February 1873), was a Bulgarian revolutionary and is a national hero of Bulgaria. Dubbed the Apostle of Freedom, Levski ideologised and strategised a revolutionary movement to liberate Bulgaria from Ottoman rule. Founding the Internal Revolutionary Organisation, Levski sought to foment a nationwide uprising through a network of secret regional committees.
Patron saint		Saint John of Rila (Bulgarian: Свети Йоан (Иван) Рилски, sveti Ioan Rilski) (876 – c. 946) was the first Bulgarian hermit. He was revered as a saint while he was still alive. The legend surrounding him tells of wild animals that freely came up to him and birds that landed in his hands. His followers founded many churches in his honor, including the famous Rila Monastery. One of these churches, "St Ivan Rilski" was only discovered in 2008 in the town of Veliko Tarnovo. Today, he is honored as the patron saint of the Bulgarians and as one of the most important saints in the Bulgarian Orthodox Church.
Folk dances (Horo)		The Bulgarian dances (Horo) (Bulgarian: Хоро), are intimately related to the music of Bulgaria. This distinctive feature of Balkan folk music is the asymmetrical meter, built up around various combinations of 'quick' and 'slow' beats. The music, in Western musical notation, is often described using compound meter notation, where the notational meter accents, i.e., the heard beats, can be of different lengths, usually 1, 2, 3 or 4.
National drink		Rakia (Fruit brandy) is the national drink of Bulgaria. Currently, there is no defined origin of rakia but there are many who claim to be the origins of the drink, most vocally Bulgaria. A recent discovery by a team of archaeologists led by Philip Petrunov discovered near the fortress "Lyutitsa" (in Ivaylovgrad) fragment of the distillation container for the production of rakia. According to experts discovery dates back to the 11th century AD and this proves that rakia is produced and consumed in Bulgaria in the 11th century AD. Unknown Bulgarian nobleman from Veliko Tarnovo, in the 14th century wrote on a glass that drinking rakia during the Church Holiday. In support of that rakia in Bulgaria was known before the invasion of the Ottomans is justification of the Turkish commander Lala Sahin to the Ottoman sultan that in 1382 failed to conquer Sofia, because "the defense of the city was entrusted to strong, healthy Bulgarians "with mustaches" that before battle drank rakia and so became invincible".
National monument(s)		The Madara Rider or Madara Horseman (Bulgarian: Мадарски конник, Madarski konnik) is an early medieval large rock relief carved on the Madara Plateau east of Shumen in northeastern Bulgaria, near the village of Madara. The monument is dated in the very late 7th, or more often very early 8th century, during the reign of Bulgarian Khan Tervel. In 1979 became enlisted on the UNESCO World Heritage List.
National monument(s)		The St. Alexander Nevsky Cathedral (Bulgarian: Храм-паметник „Свети Александър Невски“, Hram-pametnik „Sveti Aleksandar Nevski“) is a Bulgarian Orthodox cathedral in Sofia, the capital of Bulgaria. Built in Neo-Byzantine style, it serves as the cathedral church of the Patriarch of Bulgaria and is one of the largest Eastern Orthodox cathedrals in the world, as well as one of Sofia's symbols and primary tourist attractions. The St. Alexander Nevsky Cathedral in Sofia occupies an area of 3,170 square metres (34,100 sq ft) and can hold 10,000 people inside.
National monument(s)		The Monastery of Saint Ivan of Rila, better known as the Rila Monastery (Bulgarian: Рилски манастир, Rilski manastir) is the largest and most famous Eastern Orthodox monastery in Bulgaria. It is situated in the southwestern Rila Mountains, 117 km (73 mi) south of the capital Sofia in the deep valley of the Rilska River at an elevation of 1,147 m (3,763 ft) above sea level, inside of Rila Monastery Nature Park. The monastery is named after its founder, the hermit Ivan of Rila (876 - 946 AD).
Adornment		A Martenitsa (Bulgarian: мартеница, pronounced [ˈmartɛnit͡sa]) is a small piece of adornment, made of white and red yarn and usually in the form of two dolls, a male and a female. Martenitsi are worn from Baba Marta Day (1 March) until the wearer first sees a stork, swallow, or budding tree (or until late March). The name of the holiday means "Grandma March" in Bulgarian and the holiday and the wearing of Martenitsi are a Bulgarian tradition related to welcoming the spring, which according to Bulgarian folklore begins in March.
National instrument		The kaba gaida is a Bulgarian musical bagpipe instrument similar to the gaida. It is larger and lower pitched than the typical gaida. It is native to the Rhodope Mountains of Bulgaria. Nowadays the most common drone tone on a kaba gaida is E.

== See also ==
- List of World Heritage Sites in Bulgaria
