= Bulgarian customs =

The main Bulgarian celebration events are :

- Baba Marta, all of March, beginning with the 1st of march
- Nestinari
- Kukeri
- Koleda (Christmas), Koledari
- Velikden (Easter)
- Name Days
- International Mother's Day, March 8
- Independence Day, March 3
- Sveti, Sveti Kiril i Metodii, May 24

Other Bulgarian customs, specific for Bulgaria, worship God, the saints, the nature, the health, and chase away bad spirits :

- St. Andrew's Day - 30 November
- Antonovden - 17 January
- Archangelden - 8 November
- Christmas Eve
- Budnik
- Easter
- Valtchi praznici
- St George's Day
- German
- Dragon chasing
- Gorestnici - 28,29,30 July
- Dimitrovden - 26 October
- St John's Eve - 24 June
- Need-fire
- Trifon Zarezan - 1 February / 14 February
- Horse riding Todorovden - 1st Saturday of Lent
- Feast of the Cross - 14 September
- Lazarice (Lazarus Saturday) - 8 days before Easter in the name of Lazarus
- Maccabees - ab 1 August for 12 days, to remember the Maccabees
- Mratinci - Chasing of bad spirits, 14 November
- Nestinarstvo - Fire dance
- Nikulden - 6 December
- Pali Kosh - 2 March - circle dances around a Campfire
- Dodola
- Petliovden - 20 January - Praying for a better harvest
- Rusalska sedmica - Dance procession like Exorcism, one week after Pentecost
- Sirni zagovezni - On Sunday, seven weeks before Easter. Jumping over the campfire and juggling with fire
- Survakane (Beginning of the new year), Kukeri (At the beginning of the new year and on Sirni zagovezni) and Koledari (on Christmas),
- Todorova nedelja - The period between Sirni zagovezni and Todorovden
- Dogs swinging - The first Monday of the period Todorova nedelja
- Throwing willow branches into water spring on Pentecost
- Throwing wood crosses into water spring on Iordanovden, the 6th of January to remember the Baptism of Jesus

== Literature ==
- Българска народна митология. Енциклопедичен речник. Съст. Анани Стойнев. Изд. гр. 7М+Логис, София, 1994.
- Маринов Димитър Народна вяра и религиозни народни обичаи. Второ фототипно издание. — София, 1994.
- Маринов Д. Жива старина. Книга перва: Верванията или суеверията на народа. — Руссе, 1891. 189 с.
