= Name days in Bulgaria =

Days associated with Eastern Orthodox saints

Name days in Bulgaria are name days associated with Eastern Orthodox saints. Some names can be celebrated on more than one day.

According to the tradition, guests are supposed to come uninvited and the person who has the celebrated name is supposed to be prepared to treat everyone. Today people prefer to invite their guests at home or at a bar or a restaurant. The celebrations are similar to those of birthdays, but usually the food, the music and the feel is somewhat more traditional, and sometimes even religious.

== January ==
- 1 : Vassil, Vesselin, Vasilena (on Vassilyovden)
- 2 : Silvia
- 4 : Tihomir
- 6 : Yordan, Bozhidar, Bogdan (on Bogoyavlenie; Yordanovden)
- 7 : Ivan, Yoan, Yoana, Ivaylo (on Ivanovden)
- 11 : Bogdan, Bogdana, Bogomil, Teodosii
- 12: Tania, Tatiana (on Sveta Tatiana)
- 14 : Adam, Kalcho, Nina
- 17 : Anton, Andon, Antonia, Donka, Doncho, Toni, Toncho (on Antonovden)
- 18 : Atanas, Atanaska, Nasko, Naska, Nacho, Tanyo, Tinka (on Atanasovden)
- 20 : Evtim
- 21 : Valeri, Valeria, Maksim
- 24 : Ksenia
- 25 : Grigor, Grigorena

== February ==
- 1 : Lozan, Trifon (on Trifon Zarezan)
- 2 : Radost, Radostin, Radina, Radoslav
- 4 : Zheko, Zhelyaz, Zhelyazko, Zhechka, Zhechko, Zhecho (also alternative spellings Jeko, Jeliaz, Jechka, Jechko)
- 5 : Dobrin, Dobrinka
- 6 : Doroteya, Ognyan, Ognyana, Plamen, Plamena, Svetla, Svetlana, Svetozar, Svetlozar, Fotina
- 10 : Valentin, Valentina, Valya, Lambi
- 13 : Evlogi, Zoya, Zhivko Zhivka
- 14 : Trifon

== March ==
- 1 : Evdokia, Marta (on Baba Marta)
- 3 : Simeon, Simona, Mona
- 4 : Gera, Gerasim, Gercho
- 6 : Krasimir, Krasimira
- 9 : Mladen, Mladena
- 10 : Galin, Galina, Galya
- 13 : Nikifor
- 17 : Alexi
- 19 : Daria
- 20 : Svetla, Svetozar
- 22 : Rosen, Rosica
- 24 : Zahari, Zaharina, Hari
- 25 : Blagovest, Blagovesta, Blagoy, Blaga, Bonka, Boncho
- 26 : Gabriela
- 28 : Albena, Boyko, Boyka, Boyan, Boyana

== April ==
- 1 : Avram *4 :Lazar. *6 : Strahil
- 12 : Yassen
- 14 : Martin, Martina, Marta
- 18 : Viktor, Viktoria
- 25 : Mark, Marko

== May ==
- 1 : Maya, Tamara
- 2 : Boris, Borislav, Borislava, Boryana (on Saint tzar Boris)
- 5 : Irina, Irena, Miroslav, Mircho, Miroslava, Mira, Miro
- 6 : Galin, Galina, Galya, Ganka, Gancho, Genko, Genoveva, Georgi, Gergana, Gergin, Gergina, Ginka, Gyuro (!Gyurov!), Zhorzh (on Gergyovden)
- 8 : Radoslav
- 9 : Hristofor
- 11 : Kiril, Kiro, Kirilka, Metodi, Metodiy, Metodiya (13 days before St. Cyril and St. Methodius' day)
- 20: Lidia, Lida
- 21 : Constantin, Dinko, Elena, Eleonora, Eli, Elin, Elka, Ilona, Koycho, Konstantin, Kosta, Kostadin, Kostadinka, Kostadinko, Kuncho, Lenko, Stanimir, Stanimira, Stanka, Stoil, Trayko
- 24 : Kiril, Kiro, Kirilka, Metodi, Metodiy, Metodiya

== June ==
- 24 : Bilyana, Encho, Enyo, Yancho, Yanaki, Yana, Yani, Yanislav, Yanka, Yanko (on Enyovden)
- 29 : Kamen, Pavel, Pavlin, Pavlina, Peyo, Penka, Pencho, Petrana, Petar, Petya, Petso (on Petrovden)
- 30 : Apostol

== July ==
- 1 : Dame, Damyan, Kuzman
- 7 : Delcho, Delyo, Nedelcho, Nedelya, Nedyalko, Nedko, Neli, Neshka, Neda, Nedelina
- 11 : Olga, Oleg
- 15 : Vladimir, Vladislav, Gospodin, Gospodinka
- 16 : Yulia, Yulian, Yuliana
- 17 : Marin, Marina, Marinka, Marinela
- 18 : Emil, Emilia, Emiliana, Emilian
- 20 : Iliya, Iliyan, Iliyana, Ilina, Ilka, Ilko, Lilo (on Ilinden)
- 22 : Lena, Magda, Magdalena, Manda, Meglena, Miglena
- 24 : Yana, Yanka,
- 25 : Ana, Anna, Anka, Aneliya, Aneta, Ani
- 27 : Panteley, Panko, Panto
- 29 : Kalin

== August ==
- 2 : Ilia, Ilija, Eliya
- 8 : Emil, Emilia, Emiliana, Emilian
- 15 : Mara, Marian, Mariana, Maria, Mariya, Mariyan, Mariyana, Masha, Mika, Mira (on Golyama Bogoroditza)
- 20 : Samuil
- 23 : Valko
- 26 : Adrian, Adriana, Natalia
- 29 : Anastas
- 30 : Aleko, Alexandra, Alexander, Sasha, Sasho (on Alexandrov Den)
- 31 : Genadi

== September ==
- 1 : Simeon, Mona, Moncho (on Simeonovden)
- 5 : Elza, Elisaveta, Izabela, Zahari, Svetozar, Svetlozara
- 8 : Maria
- 14 : Krastan, Krastina, Kristina, Kristiana, Krastyo, Kristal, Kancho, Stavri (on Krastyovden)
- 16 : Lyudmil, Lyudmila
- 17 : Vera, Verka, Vyara, Lyuba, Lyuben, Lyubov, Lyubomir, Nadezhda, Nadya, Sevda, Sofia, Nadejda (on Sveta Sofia)
- 22 : Galabin, Galabina

== October ==
- 3 : Denis, Denislav, Denislava
- 6 : Toma, Tomi
- 11 : Filip
- 14 : Paraskeva, Penka, Pencho, Petka, Petko (on Petkovden)
- 18 : Zlatan, Zlatka, Zlatko, Zlatomir, Luka, Lukan
- 26 : Dimitrina, Dimitar, Dima, Dimo, Dragan, Mitro, Mitra (on Dimitrovden)
- 27 : Nestor
- 28 : Lachezar

== November ==
- 8 : Angel, Angelina, Gavril, Emil, Emilia, Emiliana, Emilian, Lina, Mila, Milen, Milena, Milyo, Mihaela, Mihail, Mihaila, Ognyan, Plamen, Rayko, Rayna, Raycho, Rangel, Rafail, Raya, Rusi, Ruska, Reni, Serafim, Ruslan (on Arhangelovden)
- 11 : Victor, Victoria, Mina, Minka, Mincho
- 14 : Filip, Filyo
- 16 : Matey
- 23 : Alexandra, Alexander, Tsanka, Tsanko
- 24 : Ekaterina, Katerina, Katya, Tinka (only female form, on Sveta Ekaterina)
- 26 : Stiliyan, Stela
- 30 : Andrea, Andrej (on Andreevden)

== December ==
- 4 : Varvara
- 5 : Sava, Savka, Slavi, Slavcho, Sabi, Slav
- 6 : Nikola, Nikolay, Niki, Nikolina, Nina, Kolyo, Neno, Nenka, Niko, Nia (on Nikulden)
- 9 : Anna, Ana, Anelia, Ani (only female form, on Sveta Anna)
- 12 : Spiridon, Spiro
- 15 : Svoboda
- 17 : Danail, Daniel, Daniela, Danko (on Sv. Danail)
- 20 : Ignat, Ognyan, Plamen, Iskra (on Ignazhden)
- 24 : Bistra, Blagorodna, Evgeni, Evgenia, Zheni, Zhechka, Parvan, Parvana
- 25 : Emil, Itso, Icho, Kristina, Kristian, Mladen, Radomir, Radoslav, Radoslava, Radostin, Radostina, Rumen, Rumyana, Hristina, Hristo, Hristofor (on Christmas)
- 26 : David, Datso, Dacho, Yosif, Yosko
- 27 : Ventsi, Ventsislav, Ventsislava, Zapryan, Sonya, Stamen, Stana, Stanislav, Stanislava, Stanimir, Stanimira, Stanka, Stanko, Stancho, Stefan, Stefana, Stefania, Stefka, Stoil, Stoimen, Stoichko, Stoiko, Stoytcho, Stoyan, Stoyana, Stoyanka, Tanya, Tsanka, Tsanko, Tsona, Tsonka, Tsonko, Tsonyo (on Saint Stefan)

== Easter related name days ==
- First Saturday of the Great Lent: Todor(a), Teodor(a), Dora, Bozhidar
- Lazarus Saturday: Lazar, Lazarina
- Palm Sunday (Eastern Churches): all flower-related names, such as Bilyan(a), Tsveta, Tsvetin(a), Tsvetelin(a), Tsvetan(a), Tsvyatko, Margarita, Liliya, Lilyan(a), Kalina, Violeta, Yavor, Zdravko, Zjumbjul, Nevena, Kameliya, Temenuzhka, Ralitsa, etc.
- Easter Sunday (Eastern Churches): Velichko, Velichka, Veliko, Velin, Vela
- Thomas Sunday: Toma, Tomislav, Tomislava
- Ascension Sunday: Spas, Spaska
