= Martenitsa =

Balkanic tradition

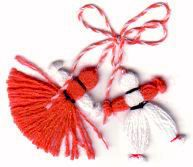
Typical Martenitsa

A Martenitsa (Bulgarian: мартеница, pronounced [ˈmartɛnit͡sa]; Macedonian: мартинка, romanized: martinka; Greek: μάρτης, romanized: mártis [ˈmaɾ.tis]; Romanian: mărțișor [mər.t͡siˈʃor]; Albanian: verore; Turkish: marteniçka [marteˈnit͡ʃka]) is a small piece of adornment, made of white and red yarn and usually in the form of two dolls, a white male and a red female. Martenitsi are worn from Baba Marta Day (March 1) until the wearer first sees a stork, swallow, or blossoming tree (or until the end of March (April 1)). The name of the holiday means "Grandma March" in Bulgarian and Macedonian, the holiday and the wearing of Martenitsi are a Bulgarian and Macedonian tradition related to welcoming the spring, which according to Bulgarian and Macedonian folklore begins in March, and very similar to Mărțișor tradition in Romania and Moldova.

In Albania, it is worn on March 14 (the old first day of March in the Julian calendar) to celebrate the Summer Fest (Dita e Verës). In Albania, the Summer Fest is dedicated to the ancient Goddess Diana.

It is inscribed in the UNESCO Representative List of the Intangible Cultural Heritage of Humanity.

== Symbolism ==
A typical Martenitsa consists of two small wool dolls, Pizho and Penda (Bulgarian: Пижо и Пенда). Pizho, the male doll, is usually predominantly white; Penda, the female doll, is distinguished by her skirt and is usually predominantly red.

The red and white woven threads symbolize the wish for good health. They are the heralds of the coming of spring and of new life. While white as a color symbolizes purity, red is a symbol of life and passion, and so some ethnologists have proposed that, in its very origins, the custom might have reminded people of the constant cycle of life and death, the balance of good and evil, and the sorrow and happiness in human life. The Martenitsa is also a stylized symbol of Mother Nature, the white symbolizing the purity of the melting white snow and the red setting of the sun, which becomes more and more intense as spring progresses. These two natural resources are the source of life. They are also associated with the male and female beginnings, and in their balance, with the need for balance in life.

== Tradition ==
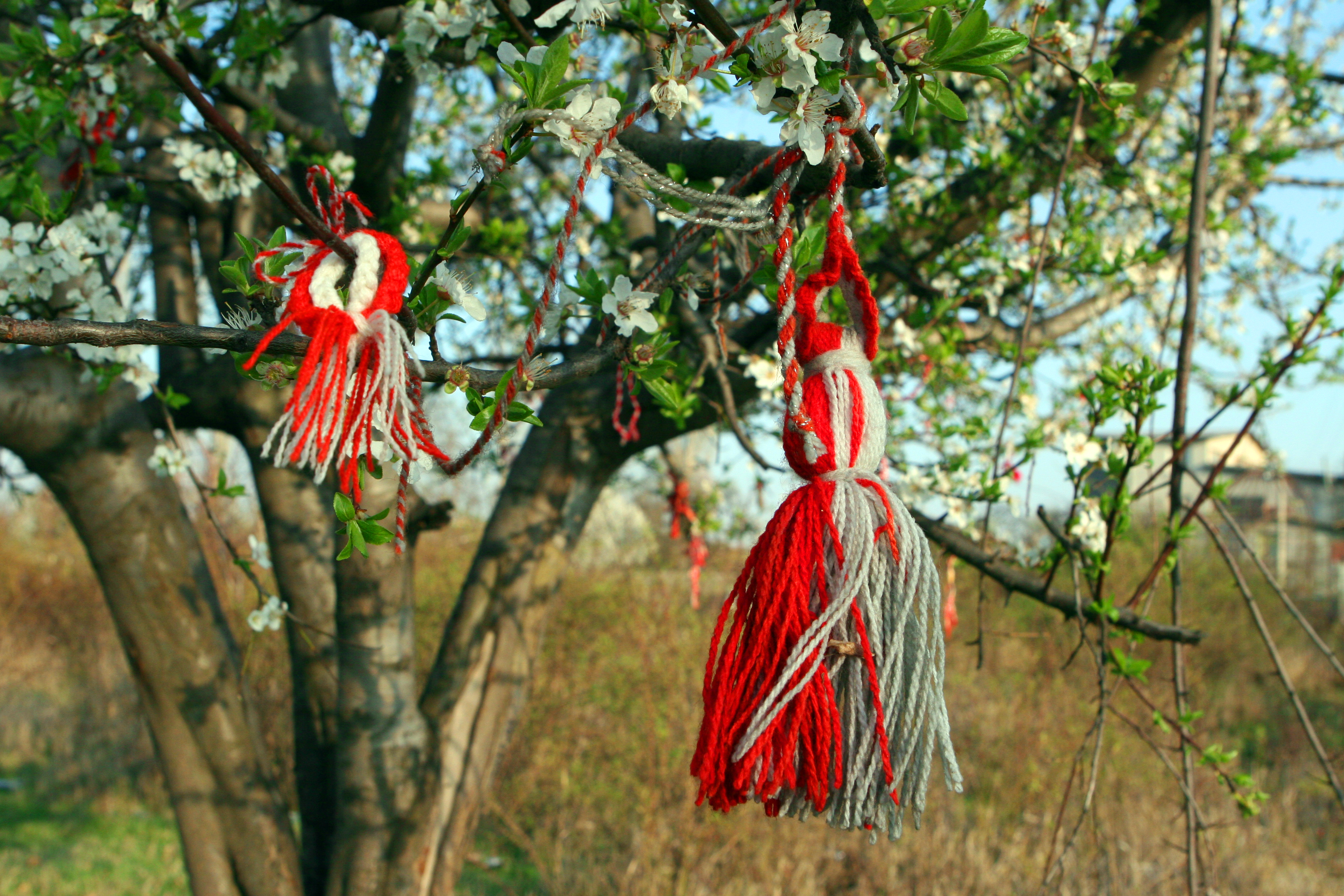
Martenitsi tied to a blossoming tree, a symbol of approaching spring

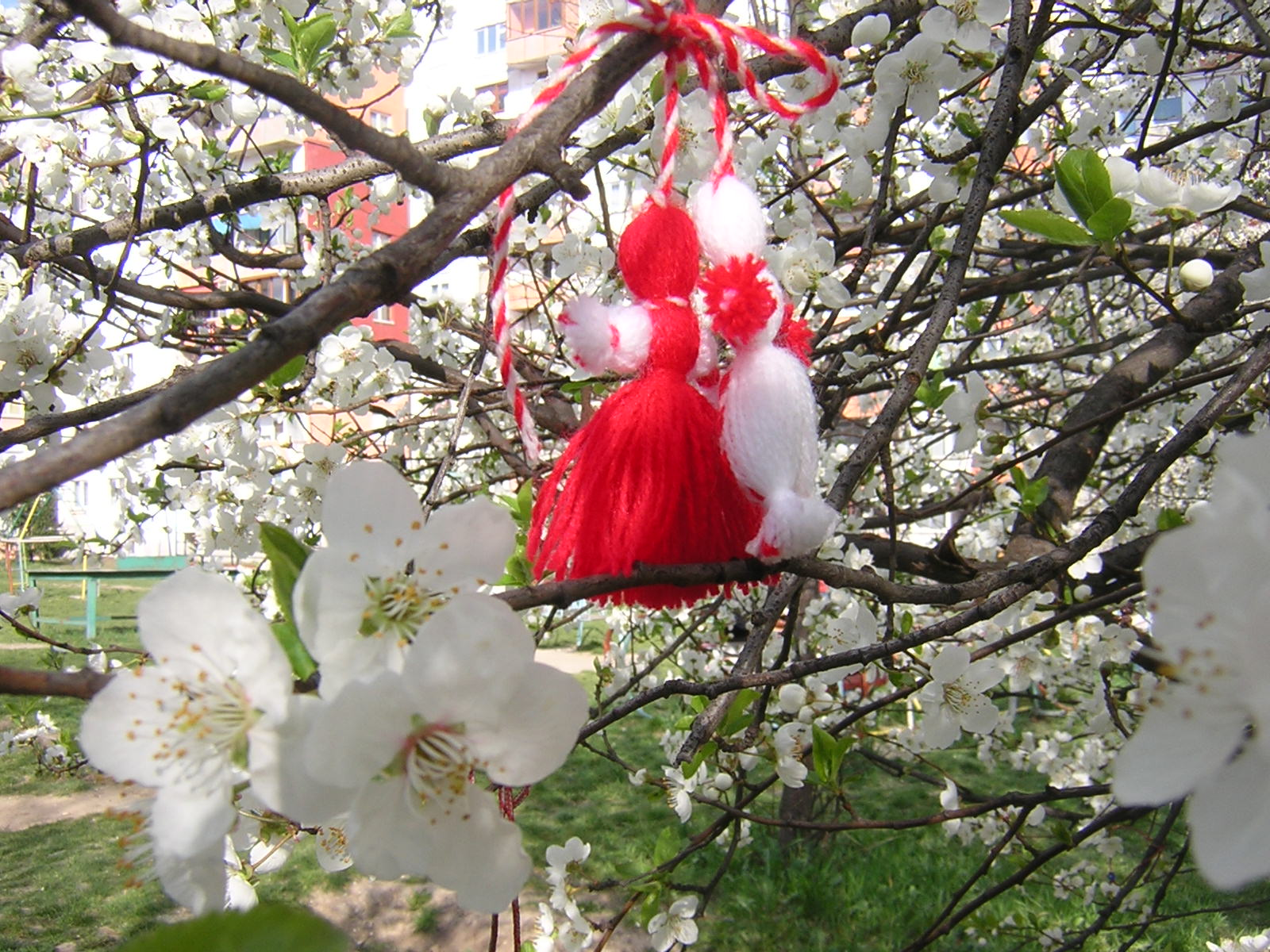
Another tied Martenitsa

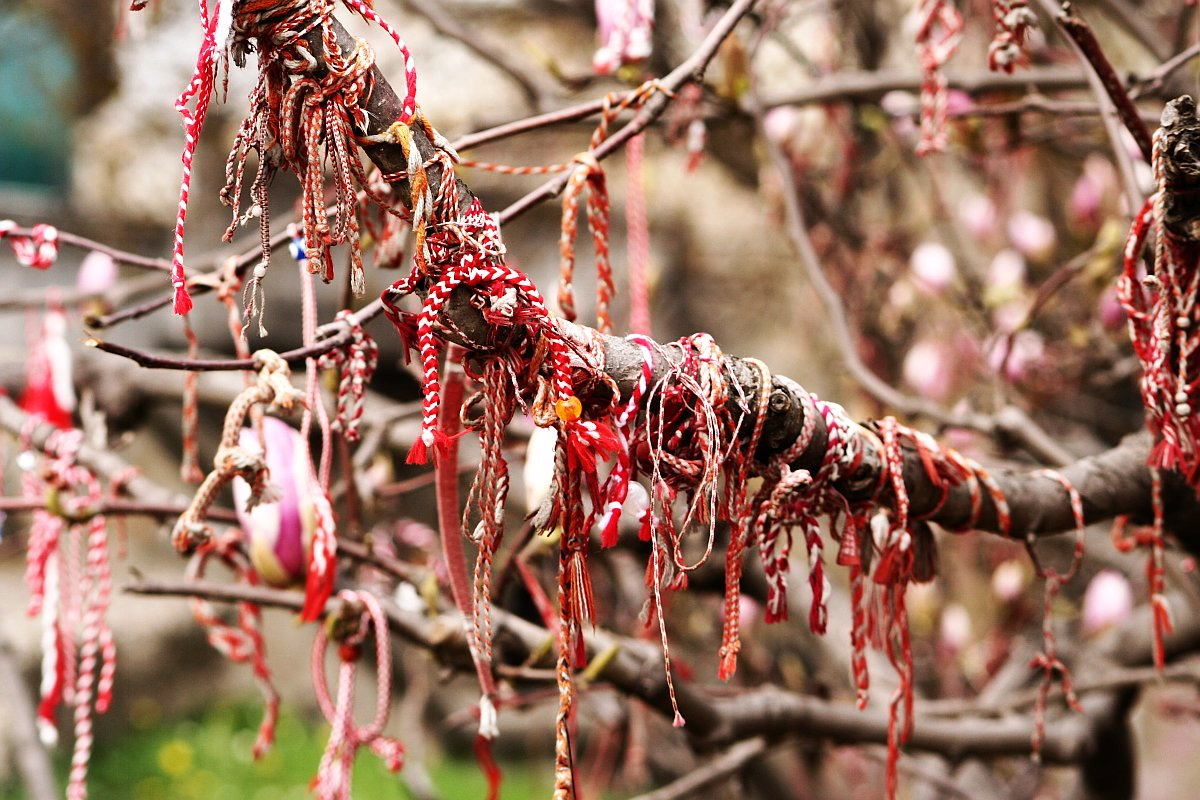
Blossoming Magnolia full of tied Martenitsi

Tradition dictates that Martenitsi are always given as gifts, not bought for oneself. They are given to loved ones, friends, and those people to whom one feels close. Beginning on the first of March, one or more are worn pinned to clothing, or around the wrist or neck, until the wearer sees a stork or swallow returning from migration, or a blossoming tree, and then removes the Martenitsa.

In Bulgarian folklore and Macedonian Slavic mythology the name Baba Marta (Bulgarian: Баба Марта, "Grandma March") evokes a grumpy old lady whose mood swings very rapidly. The common belief is that by wearing the red and white colors of the Martenitsa, people ask Baba Marta for mercy. They hope that it will make winter pass faster and bring spring. The first returning stork or swallow is taken as a harbinger of spring and as evidence that Baba Marta is in a good mood and is about to retire.

The ritual of finally taking off the Martenitsa is different in different parts of Bulgaria and North Macedonia. Some people tie the Martenitsa on a branch of a fruit tree, thus giving the tree health and luck, which the person wearing the Martenitsa has enjoyed themselves while wearing it. Others put it under a stone with the idea that the kind of creature (usually an insect) closest to the token the next day will determine the person's health for the rest of the year. If the creature is a larva or a worm, the coming year will be healthy and full of success. The same luck is associated with an ant, the difference being that the person will have to work hard to reach success. If the creature nearest the token is a spider, then the person is in trouble and may not enjoy luck, health, or personal success.

Wearing one or more Martenitsi is a popular Bulgarian and Macedonian tradition. The time during which they are worn is meant to be a joyful holiday commemorating health and long life.

Modern Martenitsi take a wider variety of forms and often incorporate colored beads and other elaboration.

== Origin ==
This tradition is an important part of the Culture of Bulgaria and there is a similar tradition in North Macedonia, as well as in Greece, Albania (known as verorja), and Romania and Moldova, where is known as Mărțișor. The tradition is related to the ancient pagan history of the Balkan Peninsula and to all agricultural cults of nature. Some specific features of the ritual, especially tying the twisted white and red woolen threads, are a result of centuries-old tradition and suggest Thracian (paleo-Balkan) or possibly Hellenic or Roman origins.

Some ethnographers claim that the custom can be traced in the Eleusinian Mysteries. The ancient equivalent of the modern Greek "martis" is thought to be the kroke (κρόκη). The custom is mentioned in Photios' Lexicon. It is said that the priests [μύσται] wrap a red thread [κρόκη] around their right hand and foot. At that time red or otherwise colored threads were used to protect children and youths from evil spirits and witchcraft.

An early 20th-century Bulgarian story relates the first Martenitsi to the 7th-century Battle of Ongal between the Bulgar Khan Asparuh and the Byzantines, which resulted in a decisive Bulgar victory. After the battle, the Asparuch sent doves with white threads to announce the victory to his main camp. The threads turned bloody during the flight, thus creating the first Martenitsa.

== See also ==
- Baba Marta
- Mărțișor
- Dita e Verës
- Albanian folk beliefs
