= Dragobete =

Romanian holiday

Dragobete is a traditional Romanian holiday celebrated on February 24. Dragobete was the son of Baba Dochia, which stands for the main person in the myth related to spring arrival and the end of the harsh winter. Due to his endless kindness he was chosen – according to some sources, by Virgin Mary – to be the Guardian of Love.

The day is particularly known as "the day when the birds are betrothed". It's said that If boys don't meet the girl they like, they will have really bad luck for the rest of the year. It is around this time that the birds begin to build their nests and mate. On this day, considered locally the first day of spring, boys and girls gather vernal flowers and sing together. Maidens used to collect the snow that lay on the ground in many villages and then melt it, using the water in magic potions throughout the rest of the year. Those who take part in Dragobete customs are supposed to be protected from illness, especially fevers, for the rest of the year. If the weather allows, girls and boys pick snowdrops or other early spring plants for the person they are courting. In Romania, Dragobete is known as a day for lovers, rather like Valentine's Day.

It is a common belief in some parts of Romania that, during this celebration, stepping over a partner's foot leads to the dominant role in the relationship. Dragobete customs vary from region to region.

In the countryside there is an old tradition with girls and boys going into the woods to pick flowers. When they return home, the traditions says that boys were running after girls to kiss them. If the girl liked the boy she let him kiss her. There is a saying in Romania that makes a lot of sense regarding this: "Dragobete kisses the girls".

== See also ==
- Mărțișor - another Romanian spring/fertility holiday
