= Baba Marta Day =

Bulgarian observance on March 1

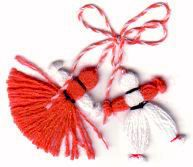
- Typical martenitsa
- Observed by: Bulgaria
- Date: 1 March
- Frequency: annual

Grandma Marta Day (or simply Baba Marta, Bulgarian: Баба Марта, "Grandma Marta") is a holiday celebrated in Bulgaria, on March 1. Martenitsas, usually in the form of a wrist band, small yarn dolls, or tassels, are created by combining red and white colored threads and are worn on that day and throughout March. They are worn until a stork or a swallow is seen, symbolizing the coming of spring, warmer weather, and well-being. Once the stork or a swallow appears the Martenitsa is taken off and hung on a blooming tree. It is common in the spring to see trees festooned in Martenitsas.

Older Bulgarians call it Birch Month as it is around the time that birch trees start growing leaves and giving sap. There is a great amount of folklore about Grandma Marta Day and the character of Baba Marta herself. The greeting exchanged on this day is Chestita Baba Marta (Bulgarian: Честита Баба Марта, "Happy Baba Marta"), often shortened to ЧБМ on greeting cards.

There are various theories, suggestions, and even several legends involving real historical figures about the symbolism of the red and white colors from which Martenitsa are made. An obvious explanation, and perhaps a common belief people share, is that "red" stands for "life/birth" and "white" denotes "anew/on clear grounds". Combined they mean "newborn", "rebirth", and "a new beginning"; a celebration of life and survival. Another popular explanation is that white stands for wisdom and red for good health, which means that anyone giving you a Martenitsa is wishing you both throughout the new year.

In March these amulets, worn around one's wrists and on their attire, can be seen almost everywhere in Bulgaria and in the neighboring regions. Being a purely pagan ritual by origin, Baba Marta Day is one of the oldest continuing traditions in Christian Europe.

== Story of Baba Marta ==
In folklore, Baba Marta ("Grandma March") is believed to be a feisty and temperamental lady who seems always to be in a bad mood with her two brothers, January and February - when the sun comes out only when she smiles. As folklore there are different versions of the Baba Marta tale. One says that on that day she does her pre-spring cleaning and shakes her mattress for the last time before the next winter - all the feathers that come out of it pour on Earth like snow - the last snow of the year. This story can also be found in German folklore, for instance in the "Frau Holle" or Mother Hulda legend. In another Baba Marta is presented as a sister of great "sechko" (January) and the small "sechko" (February) - the old word "sechko" most probably comes from "sech", meaning cold. She is always dissatisfied with her husband as they are either drunk on wine or are otherwise harmful. The old woman (bride) becomes angry, hence the weather breaks.

According to a widespread story, an old shepherd decided to rise her flocks up in the mountains during the last days of March, thinking that Baba Marta would bestow good weather on her because she was as old as Marta. Baba Marta became infuriated by being considered old, and asked her younger brother (April) to lend her a few days. April granted her wish and these days are called "borrowed days", "zaemnitsi", or "few days" in the Bulgarian folk tradition. Marta let out the strong snows and blizzards that froze the shepherd and her flocks in the mountains.

== Festival of Baba Marta ==
Besides the celebration on March 1, Baba Marta is also celebrated on March 9 (Mladenci) and March 25th (Annunciation). The holidays are associated with the last days of winter and the coming of spring. On these holidays ritual acts are performed which are believed to mellow Baba Marta's temper. Participants in her holidays are women, girls, and children. It is believed that Baba Marta is not fond of older women, and they should not under any circumstances cause her anger.

== See also ==
- Bistritsa Babi
- Martisor
