= Baba Dochia =

Romanian mythical figure

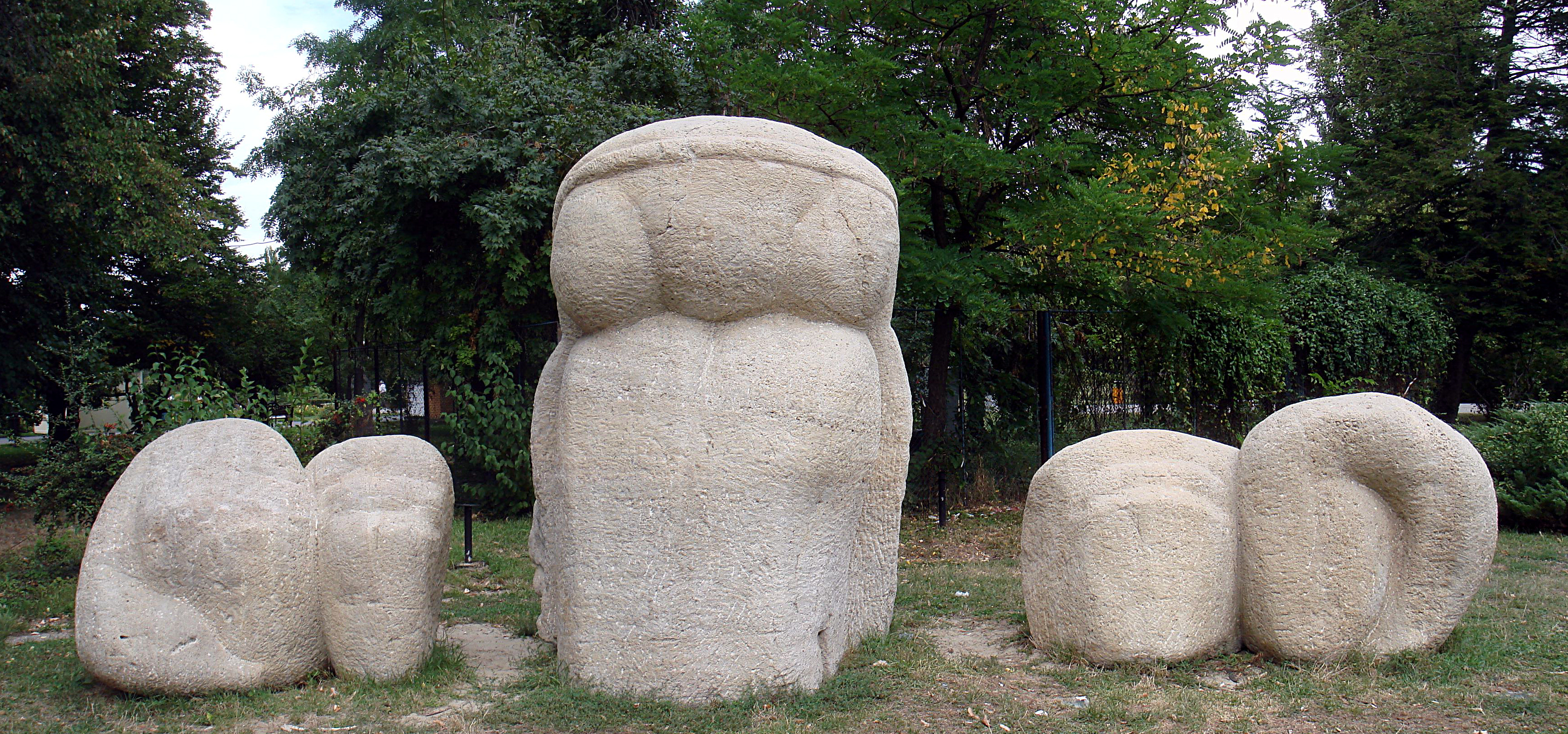
Dochia's Legend – sculpture by Gheorghe Iliescu-Călinești, Herăstrău Park, Bucharest

In Romanian mythology, Baba Dochia, or The Old Dokia, is a figure identified with the return of spring. She is sometimes imagined as "an old woman who insults the month of March when she goes out with a herd of sheep or goats." Supposedly the name originates from the Byzantine calendar, which celebrates the 2nd-century martyr-saint Eudokia of Heliopolis (Evdokia) on March 1. The Romanian Dokia personifies mankind's impatience in waiting for the return of spring.

== The legend of Dragomir ==
Baba Dochia has a son, called Dragobete, who is married. Dochia ill-treats her daughter-in-law by sending her to pick up berries in the forest at the end of February. God appears to the girl as an old man and helps her in her task. When Dochia sees the berries, she thinks that spring has come back and leaves for the mountains with her son and her goats. She is dressed in twelve lambskins, but it rains on the mountain and the skins get soaked and heavy. Dochia has to get rid of the skins and when frost comes, she perishes from the cold with her goats. Her son freezes to death with a piece of ice in his mouth as he was playing the flute.

== The legend of Dragobete and the Babele myth ==
Another version of this story is that Dragobete marries a girl against Baba Dochia's will. Angry with her son's decision, she sends her daughter in law to wash some black wool in the river and tells her not to come back until the wool has turned white. The girl tries to wash it, but the wool would not change color. In despair and with her hands frozen from the cold water of the river, the girl starts crying, thinking that she would never be able to see her loved husband again. Then Jesus sees her from the sky and feels sorry for her, so he gives her a red flower telling her to wash the wool with that. As soon as she washes the wool as told by Jesus, it turns white, so the girl happily returns home. When Baba Dochia hears about her story, she gets angry and thinks spring has come, since the man (who the girl had not recognized as being Jesus) was able to offer her a flower. She leaves for the mountains dressed in nine coats. As the weather changes fast on the mountain, she starts throwing away her coats, one by one, until she is left with no coat. But as soon as she drops her last coat, the weather changes again and Baba Dochia is frozen on the mountain.

=== Babele myth ===
A folk myth associates the 9 days from March 1 to March 9 with the nine coats she's shedding. Her spirit is haunting every year around that time, bringing snowstorms and cold weather before the spring sets in. Women used to pick a day out of these 9 beforehand, and if the day turns out to be fair, they'll be fair in their old days, and if the day turns out to be cold, they'll turn bitter when older. In Romanian language babele is the plural of baba "the hag" or "the old woman".

Dochia is sometimes depicted as a proud woman who teases the month of March, who in return gets its revenge by taking some days from February.

== Legend of Dochia and Trajan ==
In other sources, Dochia was the daughter (or sister) of Decebalus, King of the Dacians. When the Roman Emperor Trajan was conquering part of the Dacian territory, Dochia seeks refuge in the Carpathian Mountains in order to avoid marrying him. She disguises herself as a shepherd and her people as a herd. When she realizes that there is no escape, she asks the supreme Dacian god Zamolxes to turn her and her herd into stone, thus becoming Babele, a rock formation in the Bucegi Mountains.

== Bibliography ==
- Victor Lazăr: Legende istorice de pe pămîntul României, II., Cluj 1922. page 38.
- Romulus Vuia: Legenda lui Dragoş. In: Studii de etnografie și folclor (Bucharest), vol I/1975, page 10.
- Claus Stephani: Dokia – Königstochter oder Stiefmutter. Bemerkungen zu einer phantastischen Gestalt in den Volkserzählungen Nordrumäniens. In: Jahrbuch für ostdeutsche Volkskunde (Marburg), vol. 28, 1985, page 283-288. ISSN 0075-2738.
- Claus Stephani: Wirklichkeit und Freiraum der Phantasie. Dämonische Wesen im Alltag und in der Volkserzählung. In: Forschungen zur Volks- und Landeskunde (Bucharest), vol. 46-47, 2003-2004, page 25-36.
- Claus Stephani: Dokia – ein phantastisches Wesen der karpatischen Volksmythologie. Rumänische Mythen und ihre Varianten in der deutsch-jüdischen und huzulischen Volkserzählung. In: Victoria Popovici; Wolfgang Dahmen; Johannes Kramer (Ed.): Gelebte Multikulturalität. Verlag Peter Lang: Frankfurt am Main, Berlin, Bern, Brüssel, New York, Oxford, Wien; 2010, page 121-128. ISBN 978-3-631-56484-4.

=== See also ===
- Baba Marta
- Mărțișor – Celebration at the beginning of spring
