= Trifon Zarezan =

Day in the slav calendar

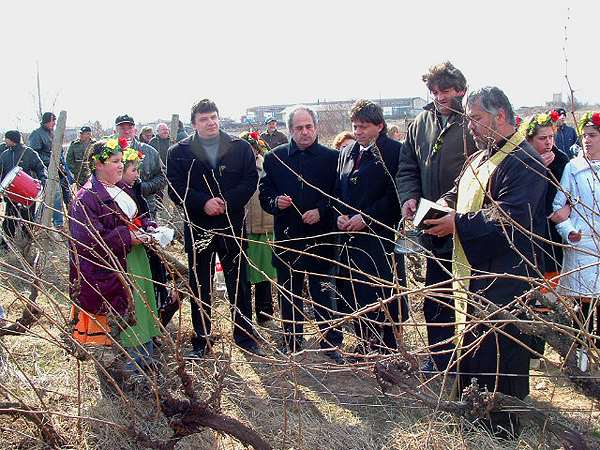
- Type: National
- Significance: Season changing - Winter to Spring
- Date: 1st of February - Gregorian calendar 14th of February - Julian calendar
- Frequency: Annual

Trifon Zarezan (Bulgarian: Трифон Зарезан) is a Bulgarian national custom observed on the 14 February (or the 1st in the Gregorian calendar) - in honor of Saint Tryphon. a martyr from the middle of the 3rd century. One of the popular holidays in the traditional Bulgarian holiday calendar. The Trifon Zarezan celebration is also known by various other names: The day of the wine makers, St. Trfon's day and others. St. Trifon is also known in other Balkan countries, it is affixed with the Orthodox calendar and is associated with the change of seasons from winter to spring. In traditional Bulgarian folklore, the feast of Trifon Zarezan is primarily associated with viticulture. It is a custom associated with the first step of the annual cycle of vine cultivation process - the grape vine spring pruning.

Most Christian churches, including the Bulgarian Orthodox Church, have adopted the New Julian calendar since 1968. From then on, Trifon Zarezan is celebrated on 1 February according to the Gregorian calendar, but the churches which adhere to the Julian calendar for liturgical purposes, celebrate it on 14 February according. As a remnant of this practice, the secular feast of the Vineyarders is still often celebrated on this date in Bulgaria. It is a Name Day celebration for people with the name Trifon and derivative or similar sounding names, such as Trifon, Trifko, Trifo, Triful, Trifa, Trifka, Trufka, Trifula, Trichko, Tricho, Trichka, Trajan, Trajana, Fune, Funcho, Radka, Racho.

It is celebrated as a professional holiday by wine growers, falconers, gardeners, barrel-makers and innkeepers. The day historically marks the beginning of grape pruning. It usually includes a variety of rituals performed by both men and women alike. St. Trifon himself is traditionally considered to be their patron saint, and in old church iconography, as the patron saint of winemakers, the saint is sometimes depicted with a scythe (a type of sickle) in his hand. In folklore tradition, Trifon Zarezan is the first of a series of consecutive feasts called Trifontsi - Trifonovden (February 1), Midsummer (February 2) and St. Simeon (February 3). These festivals are associated with wolves mating at this time, and certain rituals are carried out - no scissors are used and nights are kept closed (to keep the wolves' jaws shut during the year) and no work is done (whoever works on these days draws wolf attacks on himself). To protect livestock, in some places (Belogradchik, Montana) special bread is prepared, which is overcooked and put in their food.
