= Baba Marta =

Bulgarian mythical character

Baba Marta (Bulgarian: Баба Марта, "Granny March") is the name of a Bulgarian mythical figure who brings with her the end of the cold winter and the beginning of the spring. Her holiday of the same name is celebrated in Bulgaria on 1 March with the exchange and wearing of martenitsi. Baba Marta folklore is also present in southeastern Serbia, namely in the municipalities of Bosilegrad and Dimitrovgrad, where there is a majority ethnic Bulgarian population living there. This is done as a reference as to a freezing weather change after a spring break.

== Baba Marta Day ==
Bulgarians celebrate on March 1 a centuries-old tradition and exchange martenitsi on what is called the day of Baba Marta. The tradition of giving friends red-and-white interwoven strings brings health and happiness during the year and is a reminder that spring is near.

Baba Marta ("Grandma March") is believed to be a feisty lady who always seems to be grudging at her two brothers, January and February, while the sun only comes out when she smiles. As folklore there are different versions of the Baba Marta tale. One says that on that day she does her pre-spring cleaning and shakes her mattress for the last time before the next winter - all the feathers that come out of it pour on Earth like snow - the last snow of the year. This story can also be found in German folklore, for instance in the "Frau Holle" or Mother Hulda legend.

== Baba Marta Beach ==
Baba Marta Beach is a beach on the southern coast of Nelson Island, an island off of Antarctica. The beach was named after the Baba Marta.

== Martenitsi ==
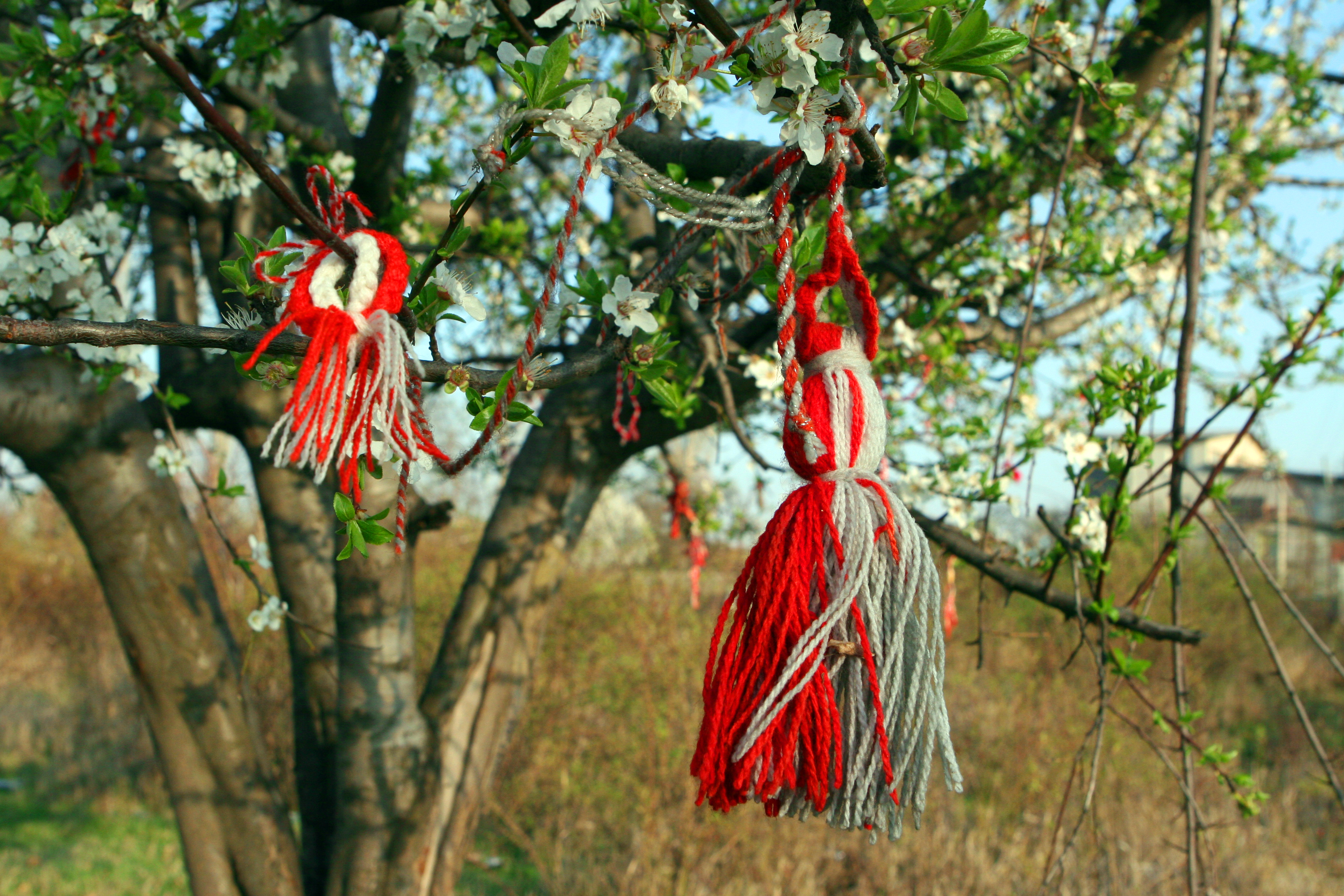
Martenitsi, hung on fruit tree in blossom, Bulgaria.

Martenitsi are red and white coloured bands or figurines that symbolise health and happiness, a lucky charm against evil spirits. They are given away to friends and family and are worn around the wrist or on clothes. In the small villages in the mountains people decorate their houses, kids and domestic animals.

The white color first symbolized man, the power light solar zone. Later, under the influence of Christian mythology it began to indicate integrity and virginity – white is the color of Christ. Red represents the woman and health: it is a sign of blood, conception and birth. In ancient times women’s wedding dresses were red. The martenitsa comes in all shapes and sizes - from building packages to strings on a newborn's arm. Children usually compete who will get the most.

People wear martenitsa for a certain period, the end of which usually is connected with the first signs of spring birds like storks or swallows. Some people then tie their martenitsa to a tree, others place it under a rock and based on what they find there the next morning guess what kind of a year this one would be.

The Bulgarian tradition resembles folklore known in parts of Asia and South America, to wear a lucky bringing friendship bracelet around the wrist until it wears out. It also resembles the German tradition of hanging empty eggs in blossoming trees during the (now Christian) Eastern folklore and the Persian tradition of hanging fruit in trees at midwinter.

== Other names ==
The Romanian holiday Mărțișor is a variant of Baba Marta.

== See also ==
- Pizho and Penda
- Baba Dochia
