= Macedonian Slavic mythology =

Macedonian Slavic Mythology is the collection of beliefs belonging to the culture of North Macedonia. It originates from the historical Slavic religious beliefs of the early Slavs that settled in Byzantine Macedonia. The works of these myths are influenced by Greco-Roman mythology.

== Mythic creatures ==
Narechnici - (Macedonian: Наречници) are demonic creatures thought to have the power to predict the destiny of a new-born baby. Usually presented as three women, Narechnici arrive on the third night following the birth of a child. Narechnici are sometimes presented as three sisters; two evil ones and one good one. The youngest sister undoes the evil curses of the two older evil sisters.

Samovili - (Macedonian: Самовили; English: Fairies ) are presented as pretty girls with golden hair and wings who live in the mountains near the water. Samovili were said to have been born from the dew of flowers; either at times when it rained while the sun was shining or under a rainbow. They serve those who steal their clothes. If their wings are removed, they transform into real women.

Zmey - (Macedonian: Змеј) are creatures with human features that have the tail of a snake, golden wings and tremendous physical strength. Zmey live either in caves or mountain tops, and are extremely intelligent. Zmey are attracted to female beauty and capture young women and take them to their remote lairs.

Lamia - (Macedonian: Ламја) is a large creature born from a snake's head stored in the horn of a buffalo. "The big Lamia has a god's head with big sharp teeth, four legs with big sharp nails and a tail, and the body is covered with fish scales." Lamia usually live in caves and guard secret treasures.

Stia - (Macedonian: Стија) are female creatures with long hair and fish-like tails, much like a mermaid. Stia live in the depths of lakes.

Vampiri - (Macedonian: Вампири; English: Vampires ) Macedonia hosted several types of vampires: the vampire-husband or sexual partner comes back to life to impregnate his wife if she had not conceived while he was alive. The vampire-housekeeper returns to help his family through additional cattle or money. There is an evil vampire that damages land and cattle. Vampires-butchers frequently work in a local butchery; vampire-animals transform from a dead man/vampire into an animal, often a dog or similar creature.

Other mythological creatures are Talasami - (Macedonian: Таласами), Giants - (Macedonian: Џинови), Dwarves - (Macedonian: Џуџиња), Chuma - (Macedonian: Чума), Ala - (Macedonian: Ала) and Vrag - (Macedonian: Враг).

== Toponyms that relate to Slavic gods or mythological creatures ==
Toponyms and Slavic mythology iewrn Macedonia

Numerous toponyms relate to Slavic gods or mythological creatures.
Veles - (Macedonian: Велес) is a city in Macedonia that has the name of the Slavic god Veles. He is the god of wine, music and cattle.

Mokosh - toponyms that relate to the goddess of fertility, women's work and women's happiness, Mokosh or Mokoshka/Makoshka are
Makoshka - (Macedonian: Макошка), Gjurgjeva Makoshka - (Macedonian: Ѓурѓева Макошка), Middle Makoshka - (Macedonian: Средна Макошка), Far Makoshka - (Macedonian: Далечна Макошка)
Goddess Morana - Morani village - (Macedonian: с.Морани), Morana's creek - (Macedonian: Морански поток), Morana's river - (Macedonian: Моранска река), Marena village - (Macedonian: с.Марена)

== See also ==
- Antiquization
- Ancient Macedonian religion
- Deities of Slavic religion
