= Day of the Balearic Islands =

Public holiday in the Balearic Islands

Dia de les Illes Balears
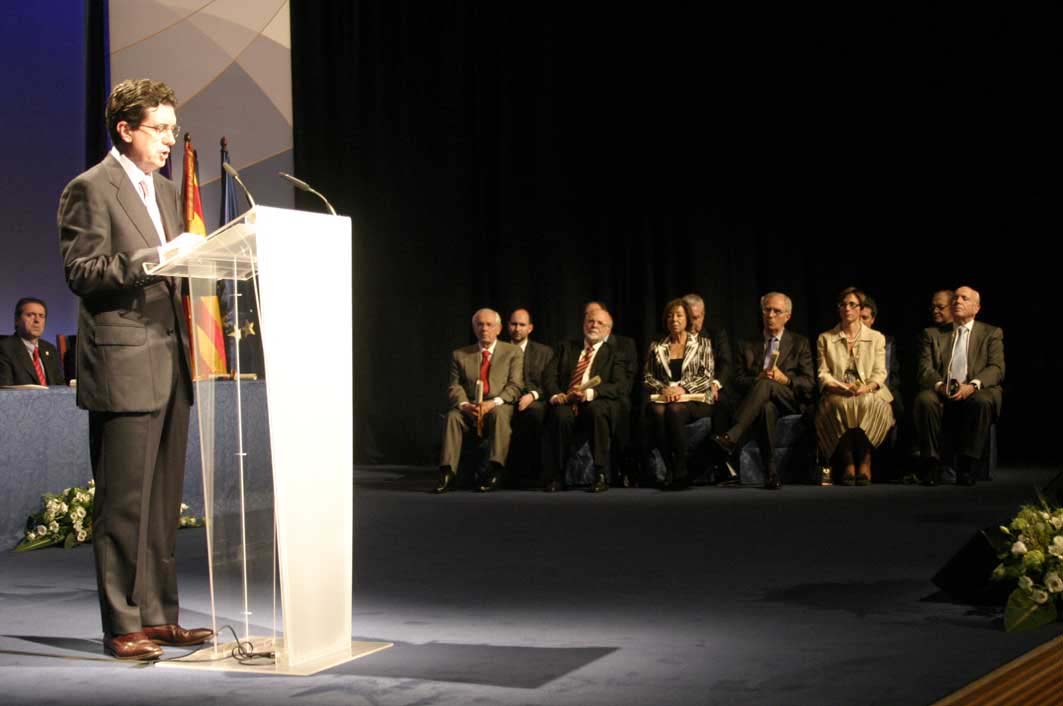
- Balearic ex-president Jaume Matas during an institutional speech
- Date: 1 March 2007
- Location: Balearic Islands, Spain

Day of the Balearic Islands (Catalan: Diada de les Illes Balears; Spanish: Día de las Islas Baleares) is a celebration and public holiday in the Balearic Islands.

It's celebrated every year on 1 March and it commemorates the creation of the Balearic Statute of Autonomy within the Spanish Constitution that became effective on 1 March 1983.
