= Mărțișor =

Celebration at the beginning of spring

A sample generic Mărțișor

Mărțișor (Romanian pronunciation: [mərt͡siˈʃor]) is a tradition celebrated at the beginning of Spring in March, involving an object made from two intertwined red and white strings with hanging tassels. It is practiced in Romania and Moldova, and very similar to Martenitsa tradition in Bulgaria, Martinka in North Macedonia and traditions of other populations from Southeastern Europe.

The word Mărțișor is the diminutive of marț, the old folk name for March (martie, in modern Romanian), and literally means "little March". The tradition originates from the Roman celebration of the New Year on 1 March.

Modern tradition involves wearing the small object on the chest like a brooch or a lapel pin, during the first part of the month, starting from 1 March. Some older traditions held it should be worn from the first new moon of March until next significant holiday for the local community, which could be anywhere between 9 March and 1 May, or until first tree flowers blossomed, depending on the area. It was also more commonly worn tied around the wrist or like a necklace.

It is inscribed in the UNESCO Representative List of the Intangible Cultural Heritage of Humanity.

== The object ==
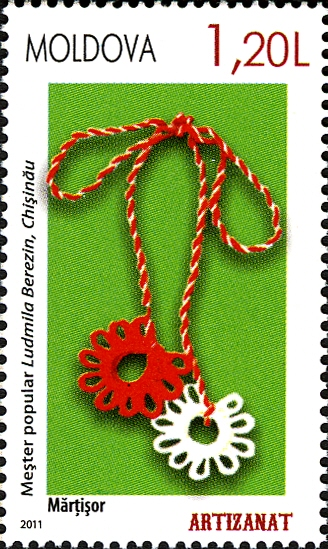
Mărțișor on a Moldovan stamp

Nowadays a Mărțișor is made from silk strings, almost exclusively red and white. Before the 19th century various other colors were used: black and white in Mehedinți and in Aromanian communities, red only in Vâlcea, Romanați, Argeș, Neamț, and Vaslui, black and red in Brăila, white and blue in Vrancea, or even multiple colours in areas of southern Transylvania and Moldova. Likewise, the material used could have been wool, linen, cotton, or silk.

Charms were attached to the strings, mostly coins, usually silver, or cross pendants. Later these ornaments were shaped to resemble various images such as four-leaf clover, ladybug, snowdrop etc. Bulgarian Martenitsa models the tassel into small dolls called Pizho and Penda. In Moldova the pendant started being made in the shape of ethnographic objects in the later part of the 20th century.

General explanations have been given by the observers of the tradition for the object's appearance: the strings are believed to represent "funia anului" - the year's "rope", intertwining summer and winter, the pendant symbolizes fortune and wealth, or, like a talisman, brought and preserved good health and beauty to the wearer.

== The tradition ==
The custom of gifting and wearing the Mărțișor is a nationwide tradition among Romanians, Moldovans, and Aromanians. Similar customs include the Martenitsa, celebrated by Bulgarians, and Martinka by Macedonians, while other communities such as Albanians, Turks from the Ohrid region, Greeks from Northern Greece, the isles of Rhodes, Dodecanese and Karpathos, the Gagauz people, and the Diaspora of these populations also practice local variations of the custom.

The object was worn primarily by children and women, less so by men, and rarely by old people. Almost each region had a different time frame for how long it should be kept, varying from 2–3 days in the Iași region of Moldavia, up to 2–3 months in the Vâlcea region of Oltenia. Very often the end of this period was associated with signs of spring in the natural world: the return of migratory birds such as swallows and white storks, the flowering of fruit trees (apple tree, cherry tree), the blossoming of roses, or with the next significant holiday in the calendar.

When the object is removed, it is customary to tie it to a branch of a tree or place it on a fence as a gift for migratory birds returning from the south. Less commonly north of the Danube, but often recorded in Dobruja, was the practice of leaving the Mărțișor under a rock, with the type of insects found on the spot being interpreted as omens, throwing it into a spring or river (Gorj), or even burning it. In modern times they are often kept as souvenirs.

The tradition is placed along with other spring celebrations marking the year's cycle: agricultural communities associated it with the end of winter and the start of spring. In particular it is connected to the days of "Baba Dochia", a mythological figure in Romanian folklore, and March, which in antiquity was the start of the year.

== See also ==
- Dragobete - another Romanian spring/fertility holiday
- Martenitsa

== Literature ==
- Despina Leonhard: Das Märzchen: Brauch und Legende / Mărțişorul: Obicei şi Legendă. Ganderkesee 2016. ISBN 978-3-944665-06-1
