= Bulgarian political crisis (2021–2026) =

- Part of the Politics of Bulgaria
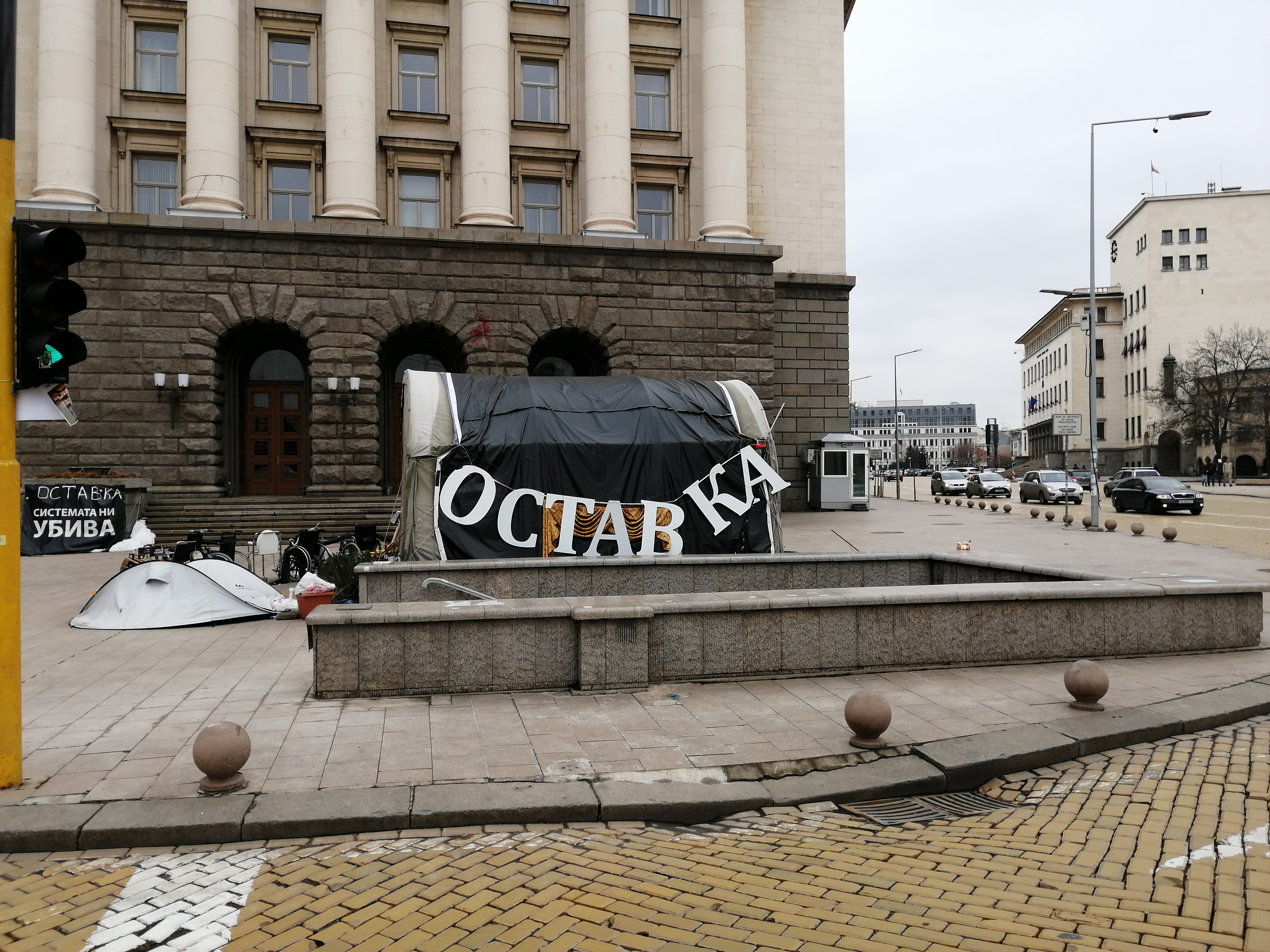
- Protest tent labelled оставка ('resign'), Sofia
- Date: 4 April 2021 – 8 May 2026 (5 years, 1 month and 4 days)
- Location: Bulgaria
- Type: Political crisis
- Cause: Difficulties in forming and retaining a stable majority governing coalition
- Outcome: Seven snap elections called during the political crisis; Fall of the Petkov, Denkov, and Zhelyazkov governments; Formation of the Radev government

From April 2021 until May 2026, Bulgaria has faced eight parliamentary elections over five years: April 2021, July 2021, November 2021, October 2022, April 2023, June 2024, October 2024 and April 2026. The political crisis has resulted in three short-lived governments, respectively led by Kiril Petkov, Nikolai Denkov, and Rosen Zhelyazkov. In the absence of a coalition government, Bulgarian presidents Rumen Radev and Iliana Iotova appointed various caretaker prime ministers, including Stefan Yanev, Galab Donev, Dimitar Glavchev, and Andrey Gurov. The crisis concluded after Progressive Bulgaria, a party founded by former president Rumen Radev, won an absolute majority in the 2026 elections and formed the Radev Government.

== Background ==
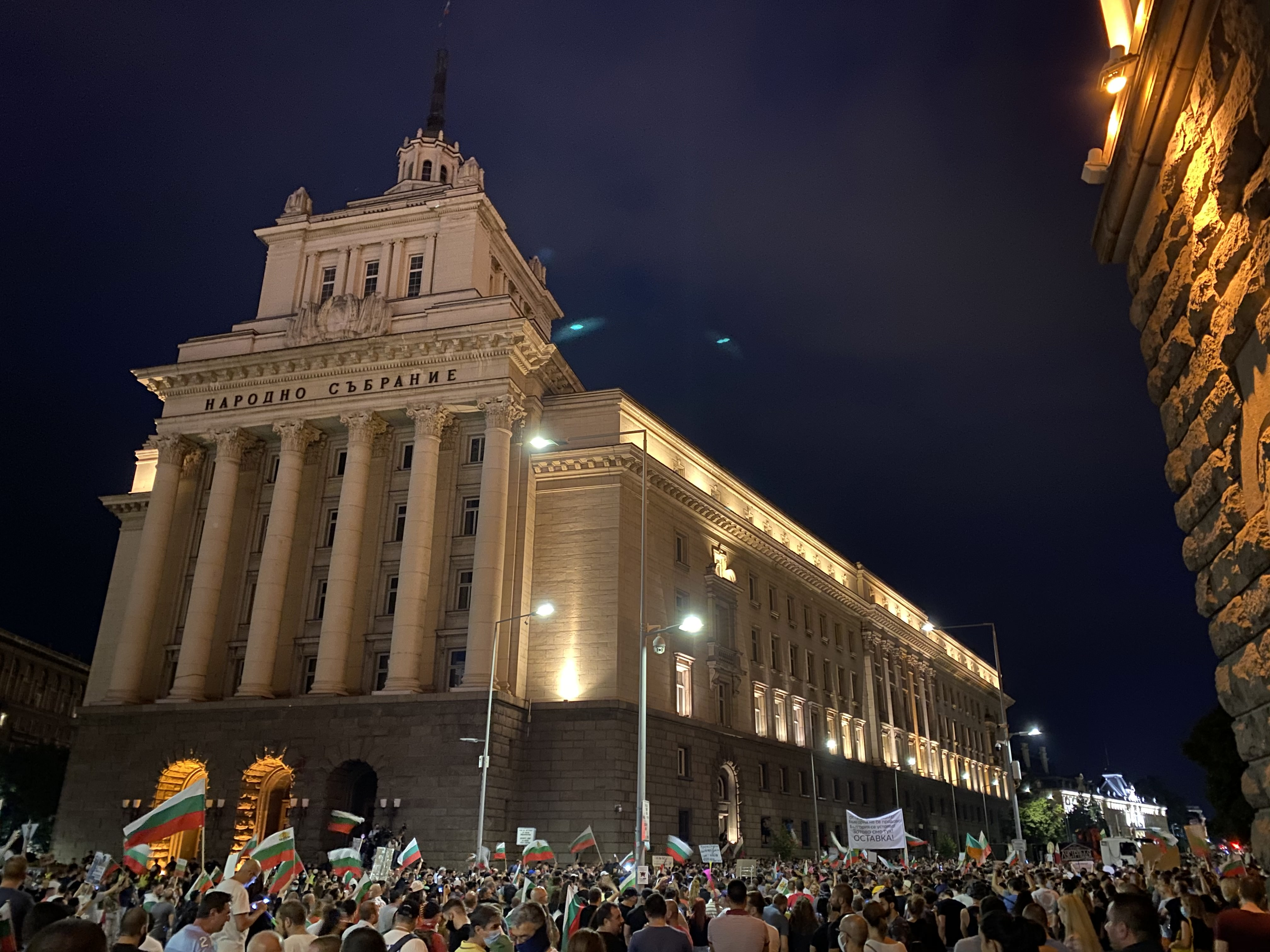
A protest in front of the National Assembly in July 2020

Since the end of Soviet domination over the country in 1990, Bulgaria has undergone a gradual economic transition to a capitalist market economy and slowly begun to drift towards the Western world; however, over the years it has been characterised by systemic corruption, state capture by elite business interests, and fragile coalitions.

Former Prime Minister Boyko Borisov, and his populist conservative party GERB, had led Bulgaria continuously since 2016. Borisov's third government was embroiled in numerous corruption scandals during his time in office, specifically surrounding the allocation of EU funds, infrastructure projects and government subsidies. Scandals including alleged photographs of the former Prime Minister lying on a bed next to a handgun, bars of gold and stacks of money, and the "Eight Dwarfs" extortion scandal culminated in protests on 9 July 2020, with the aim of removing Borisov's government and Chief Prosecutor Ivan Geshev.

These protests continued daily until after the government's term concluded on 16 April 2021. The protests saw the rise to prominence of several so-called "parties of change", consisting mainly of new political parties which opposed Borisov, many of which joined in with the protests. The main three electoral coalitions or parties in this bloc were There Is Such a People (ITN), Democratic Bulgaria (DB) and Stand Up! Mafia, Get Out! (IMSV), and polls suggested this bloc garnered large support.

== 2021 elections ==
=== April 2021 election ===
Results map of the April 2021 election

The election took place on 4 April 2021, and was scheduled as a regular election following four years since the 2017 election. Borisov's governing coalition lost its majority in the 240-seat National Assembly, with the government-supporting parties falling from a combined 134 seats to 75, and only GERB remained in the National Assembly.

In contrast, all three of the "parties of change" groupings entered the national assembly, winning a total of 92 seats, with 51 of these belonging to Slavi Trifonov's ITN. The Socialist Party (BSPzB) also suffered its worst result in a democratic election. The election also saw turnout drop 3.5 percentage points to 49.1%. The "Anti-Corruption" bloc ruled out working with Borisov and GERB, and as such it was unlikely any government would be formed. President Rumen Radev gave first mandate to GERB as the largest party, who failed to form a government with the former foreign minister, Daniel Mitov, as the nominated prime minister.

The second mandate was offered to ITN, which refused after GERB had suggested it would be willing to support an ITN-led government. Radev gave the final mandate to Korneliya Ninova of the BSPzB, who refused to form a government after the "parties of change" refused to work with them. Stefan Yanev was appointed by Radev to lead an interim government, and a snap election was called for 11 July.

=== July 2021 election ===
Results map of the July 2021 election

The July election saw ITN continue on its upward momentum, topping the polls in the election with 65 seats. The "parties of change" rose to 112 seats, still shy of the 121 needed for a majority. GERB fell to 63 seats, and BSPzB continued its downward trend. Turnout dropped 8.7 percentage points to 40.4%. When ITN was handed the mandate by Radev, it opted to form a minority government with the support of the other anti-corruption parties and BSPzB, but the negotiations fell through. GERB ruled out trying to form a government, and BSPzB failed to convince other parties to support the caretaker government for a full four-year term. Another election was scheduled for 14 November, the same time as the presidential election. Yanev continued as caretaker prime minister.

=== November 2021 election ===
Results map of the November 2021 election

After ITN was perceived to have failed to work constructively with other parties to form a government, their support drastically dropped, to fourth place behind GERB, DB and BSPzB in some polls. In August, there was speculation that two popular cabinet ministers from Yanev's first caretaker government, Kiril Petkov and Assen Vassilev, could form a new anti-corruption party, and the project was officially launched on 17 September. We Continue the Change (PP) hoped to be a uniting force which could bring together a government following the elections. At the election, PP did well, with 67 seats. The "parties of change" fell to 108 seats, with IBG-NI (formerly ISMV) falling out of the National Assembly. GERB and BSPzB continued to fall in their seat count. Revival (VAZ), a far-right party, also entered the Assembly following protests against the interim government's introduction of a COVID-19 vaccine passport or "green pass". Turnout fell by a further 2 percentage points to 38.4%.

Following the election, Petkov said he would be willing to work with any party which wished to join the fight against corruption in Bulgaria. The Turkish minority interest party Movement for Rights and Freedoms (DPS) and GERB were snubbed by PP. On 10 December, the leaders of PP, BSP, ITN and DB announced they had agreed to form a coalition. Radev, who was re-elected as president, gave PP the first mandate. With the first mandate, PP proposed a government. This was approved by the National Assembly on 13 December.

Investiture; Kiril Petkov (PP)
Ballot →	13 December 2021
Required majority →	121 out of 240
Yes: • PP (67); • BSPzB (26); • ITN (25); • DB (16)	134 / 240
No: • GERB-SDS (59); • DPS (32); • VAZ (13)	104 / 240
Abstentions: • None	0 / 240
Absentees: • DPS (2)	2 / 240
Result →	Yes

== Petkov government ==
One of the first challenges of the new government was the Russian invasion of Ukraine. In February, Defense Minister Yanev was dismissed after he denied to call the invasion war, instead using the term "special military operation" as was used by Russia. BSP also threatened to leave the government if Bulgaria sent military aid to Ukraine. Despite this, according to investigations by Welt, Bulgaria used intermediaries to provide Kyiv with weapons, ammunition and diesel fuel. Bulgaria was also at the forefront of urging that the EU impose sanctions on Russia as soon as possible; however, as a result of this action, the Russian-state affiliated Gazprom severed gas exports to the country. After a dispute about lifting the veto against North Macedonia to allow them to join the European Union, ITN withdrew from the government on 8 June 2022, reducing it to a minority government. Six of ITN's delegates left the party in order to support Petkov's government.

=== Removal ===
On 22 June 2022, a motion of no-confidence succeeded, with 123 members of parliament voting against the government. As no party was able to form another government within that parliament, President Radev scheduled another election for October 2022 and appointed another interim government, led by Galab Donev, who had been Minister for Labour and Social Policy in all of the interim governments appointed by Radev (Gerdzhikov, Yanev 1, and Yanev 2).

Vote of no-confidence
Ballot →	22 June 2022
Required majority →	121 out of 240
Confidence: • PP (67); • BSPzB (26); • DB (16); • Independent (6); • DPS (1)	116 / 240
No-confidence: • GERB-SDS (59); • DPS (33); • ITN (19); • VAZ (12)	123 / 240
Abstentions: • None	0 / 240
Absentees: • VAZ (1)	1 / 240
Result →	No-confidence

== 2022 and 2023 elections ==
=== 2022 election ===
Results map of the 2022 election

The parties which had formed the previous coalition—PP, BSPzB and DB—failed to gain a majority, only reaching 98 seats. Two pro-Russian and nationalist parties made gains, namely VAZ and the newly formed Bulgarian Rise (BV). BV was led by former interim prime minister Yanev. GERB became the largest party with around 25% and 67 seats. ITN failed to reach the 4% threshold. It took three days for the Assembly to vote on a chairperson following the election. In the meantime, a dog called "Johnny" received joking endorsements from the public to become the chairman instead. Eventually, Vezhdi Rashidov from GERB was approved as a compromise on 21 October. The first mandate went to GERB, and they proposed Nikolay Gabrovski. The parliament decided not to support Gabrovski on 14 December.

Investiture; Nikolay Gabrovski (GERB)
Ballot →	14 December 2022
Required majority →	121 of 240
Yes: • GERB-SDS (67); • DPS (35); • BV (11)	113 / 240
No: • PP (53); • VAZ (27); • BSPzB (24); • DB (20); • Independent (1)	125 / 240
Abstentions: • None	0 / 240
Absentees: • DPS (1); • BV (1)	2 / 240
Result →	No

During the government formation, a debate about the return of paper ballots broke out, which were abolished due to concerns of vote buying. GERB, DPS and BSP supported its return and were able to override a veto of President Radev against the changes of the electoral code. The second mandate went to the second largest party, PP, on 3 January 2023. The third and last mandate was given to BSP, which was also unable to form a government. This triggered snap elections, which were scheduled for 2 April 2023. However BSP then opened up the possibility of cooperation with GERB, which had the potential for a breakthrough. Galab Donev was selected by Radev to lead another interim government.

=== 2023 election ===
Results map of the 2023 election

The election on 2 April marked the 5th election the country had faced in 2 years. It was suggested that the political turmoil could impact Bulgaria joining the Eurozone. PP negotiated with DB, alongside other minor organisations, to run on a joint list together for the 2023 election, a proposal all constituent parties of DB supported. They hoped to prioritise justice reform, joining the Schengen Area and the Eurozone. The two parties were already working together in the upcoming local elections. On 10 February, DB announced they had come to an agreement and would be running on a joint list, PP–DB. Going into the election, PP–DB hoped to form a minority government, while GERB supported forming a grand coalition between them and PP–DB, which Borisov said would take time but could solve the political crisis.

The election saw the GERB-led list retain its position in first, increasing its seat count to 69. PP–DB did worse than expected and were considered the losers of the night, dropping down to 64. VAZ rose above DPS, which stayed stable, and ITN narrowly re-entered the assembly. BV fell below the threshold. In terms of government negotiations, GERB stated that they would work with anyone, PP–DB broadly did not wish to join a government alongside GERB, and VAZ suggested that they would not join a coalition government. BSP, DPS and ITN were vaguer about who they would support, but Ninova said that BSP were open to negotiating with all parties.

At the first sitting of the Assembly on 12 April, no speaker could be elected, with the parliamentarians only sitting for a few minutes. There was little progress toward government formation, though GERB and PP–DB pledged to meet and pass laws where the two groupings could see eye-to-eye. On 22 May, PP and GERB agreed to form a government with a rotational premiership. Nikolai Denkov, PP's candidate would be the Prime Minister for the first 9 months of the government and Mariya Gabriel, the GERB candidate, would serve as Deputy Prime Minister and Foreign Affairs Minister. After 9 months, the two would switch positions. Petkov claimed the government was not a coalition, and that it was the best they could do, despite breaking their pre-election promise. Petkov also said he hoped the government could survive for at least 18 months, and confirmed he would not be a part of the cabinet.

It was reported that DB would support the government, but with no ministers in government. Alleged recordings from an incriminating PP meeting, including both leaders, were released by Radostin Vassilev, an MP for PP–DB, who left the party. Petkov claimed the recordings did not represent the truth and were manipulated. There were suggestions that these recordings could impact the formation of a PP and GERB cooperation agreement, but Borisov said it would not make an impact. Denkov, the proposed Prime Minister, released the cabinet composition alongside the proposed Deputy Prime Minister, Gabriel, on 2 June. They announced that they were negotiating with DPS, in order to achieve the supermajority of 160 MPs needed to enact constitutional reforms. DPS said they would not prevent the government's formation, but they were more vague regarding their explicit support.

Investiture; Nikolai Denkov (PP)
Ballot →	6 June 2023
Required majority →	121 of 240
Yes: • GERB-SDS (68); • PP–DB (61); • DPS (2)	131 / 240
No: • VAZ (37); • BSPzB (19); • ITN (11); • GERB (1); • Independent (1)	69 / 240
Abstentions: • None	0 / 240
Absentees: • DPS (34); • BSPzB (4); • PP–DB (2)	40 / 240
Result →	Yes

== Denkov government ==
The Denkov government's primary goals were judicial reform and continuing Bulgaria's accession process into the Schengen Area and Eurozone. The government faced two no confidence votes. The first was submitted by BSP, VAZ and ITN over energy policy, in October 2023. The Denkov government won the vote by a large margin, supported by the coalition parties and DPS. The same three parties supported another no confidence motion regarding defence and security in November 2023. Initially, GERB and DPS staged a walkout during the debate, leading to the government narrowly surviving with 66 votes to keep them and 61 to oust them. Due to re-voting requests and the quorum not being met, the vote was repeated, which the government survived comfortably.

=== Resignation and agreement collapse ===
The Denkov government submitted its resignation on 5 March 2024 as scheduled in the rotation agreement, but would stay in place as a caretaker government until the negotiations for a rotation government had concluded. The government's resignation was approved unanimously by the National Assembly. Gabriel, as GERB's proposed candidate for PM, received the first mandate to form a government from President Radev. She proposed a government without getting the consent of PP–DB, and PP–DB ministers subsequently declared they did not wish to enter a government led by Gabriel. Further negotiations followed, but they broke down, with disagreements over cabinet positions and support of DPS. PP–DB were given the second mandate to form a government on 26 March, but as GERB had ruled out accepting a government, the mandate was returned the following day unfulfilled. President Radev chose to give the third and final mandate to ITN on 28 March, who rejected it, returning it in seconds. Further elections were likely to be held on 9 June 2024, to coincide with the European Parliament elections on the same day.

== 2024 elections ==
=== June 2024 election ===
Results map of the June 2024 election

The June 2024 election saw similar results for most parties to the 2023 election. Notably, PP–DB dropped into third place behind DPS, with its vote share falling by almost 7 points. Velichie, a minor nationalist party, passed the 4% threshold, and so entered the National Assembly. Coalition negotiations again failed to produce a feasible government. A key development was a split and the expulsion of MPs from DPS over the disagreements between the two chairmen on whether they should support a GERB-led government. Velichie also split, with reports that some were considering supporting a GERB-DPS government; however, the investiture proposal for a minority government by GERB failed to get a majority of the votes, with the results as follows:

Investiture; Rosen Zhelyazkov (GERB)
Ballot →	3 July 2024
Required majority →	120 of 240
Yes: • GERB–SDS (68); • DPS (30)	98 / 240
No: • PP–DB (38); • VAZ (38); • BSPzB (18); • ITN (16); • DPS (14); • Velichie (13); • Independent (2)	138 / 240
Abstentions: • DPS (1); • PP–DB (1)	2 / 240
Absentees: • DPS (1); • BSPzB (1)	2 / 240
Result →	No

The second and third mandates to form a government went to PP–DB and ITN respectively. PP–DB immediately returned the mandate, while ITN attempted to build support for a Euro-Atlantic expert government but ended up returning the mandate unfulfilled. By the end of August 2024, the composition of the Assembly was as follows:

Composition of the 50th Parliament
(before October election)

GERB-SDS (68 MPs)
PP–DB (39 MPs)
VAZ (38 MPs)
DPS (22 MPs)
BSPzB (18 MPs)
ITN (16 MPs)
Independents expelled from DPS
(25 MPs, led by Ahmed Dogan)
Independents expelled from the former Velichie
(6 MPs, led by Nikolay Markov)
Independents from the dissolved Velichie
(6 MPs, led by Ivelin Mikhailov)
Independents expelled from BSPzB
(2 MPs)

On 27 August, the central leadership organisation of the DPS removed Delyan Peevski as chairman of the party, and seven MPs close to Peevski were expelled from the party. This move has been linked to Ahmed Dogan, MP and honorary chairman of the party. Peevski called the move unconstitutional, and gained control of the official party website. This followed the rift in the party following the election, where the parliamentary group split. The controversy surrounding Peevski led to two groups emerging, DPS-Peevski and DPS-Dogan, with both groups registering as electoral coalitions with the acronym DPS in order to get around the rules of the electoral commission. After DPS–Peevski was recognised to be the legitimate DPS by the Supreme Administrative Court of Bulgaria, DPS–Dogan changed their name to "Alliance for Rights and Freedoms" (АПС instead of ДПС) and registered without listing DPS as a member of the alliance. The DPS mayors split 50:50 between both groups.

=== October 2024 election ===
Results map of the October 2024 election (prior to recalculation)

The October election for most major parties saw similar results to the election in June. DPS–Peevski came in fourth, while DPS–Dogan came sixth with 7% of the vote. For the first time, Morality, Unity, Honour (MECh) entered the National Assembly, while Velichie came within 30 votes of passing the threshold (before re-counts). Following the election, there were struggles to elect a speaker of the Assembly and begin the parliamentary session. After 11 voting sessions, on 6 December 2024, Nataliya Kiselova from BSP was elected with the support of GERB, PP–DB, DPS–Dogan and BSP.

The efforts to form a government were led by GERB, and initially they attempted to form a government with ITN, BSP and DB from PP–DB throughout December 2024. In January 2025, negotiations between GERB and DB broke down, though DPS–Dogan agreed to negotiate to support the government. Negotiations were successful, and the three-party coalition with support from DPS–Dogan was approved on 16 January.

Investiture; Rosen Zhelyazkov (GERB); Zhelyazkov Government
Ballot →	16 January 2025
Required majority →	absolute majority among present MPs (120 of 239)
Yes: • GERB–SDS (68); • BSP–OL (20); • APS (Dogan) (19); • ITN (18)	125 / 240
No: • PP–DB (37); • VAZ (35); • DPS–NN (Peevski) (30); • MECh (12)	114 / 240
Abstentions: • None	0 / 239
Absentees: • GERB–SDS (1)	1 / 240
Result	Yes
Source: BTA

This election was marred by controversy, with all parties bar DPS–Peevski contesting the results and submitting complaints to the Constitutional Court. This process led to an investigation and subsequent ruling in March 2025 that 16 of the 240 MPs had been elected illegally. The recalculation saw the votes of all parties change, with the biggest drop for DPS–Peevski, and also that Velichie had passed the threshold, which meant other parties' seat totals were reduced. The court suggested that there was further electoral fraud than had been found during the process, but that it did not have the power to recognise it. The recalculation resulted in a reduction of the government's majority.

== Zhelyazkov Government ==
Rosen Zhelyazkov formed a coalition government comprising GERB–SDS, BSP, and ITN, with external support from APS.

=== Government instability and resignation ===
Following the recalculation of the votes in March 2025, the government's majority was cut to 1 due to the illness of a deputy, and GERB leader Boyko Borisov suggested that if the government was not supported by DPS–Peevski at the budget, there would have to be new elections. In early April, DPS–Dogan said that they would continue to support the government until they made significant steps towards adopting the Euro. However, on 15 April, they backtracked and decided to rescind their support for the government, partially due to the fact that the government was collaborating with Peevski, a red line for them. Due to Peevski's unofficial support, the government survived. After repeated protests surrounding the adoption of the controversial budget in November and December 2025, the government resigned.

== 2026 election and end of crisis ==
Results map of the 2026 election

Following the resignation of the Zhelyazkov government, President Radev gave the mandate to form a new government to GERB–SDS, PP–DB, and APS respectively, with all three rejecting the mandate. On 19 January 2026, President Radev announced his intention to resign, with Iliana Iotova succeeding him as president. Iotova appointed Andrey Gurov as caretaker prime minister on 18 February and set the date for new elections for 19 April. Radev's Progressive Bulgaria party won an outright majority in the election, the first time this occurred since 1997.

After being given the first governing mandate by President Yotova on 7 May 2026, Radev declared the end of the Bulgarian political crisis. Subsequently, the Radev Government was elected by the National Assembly.

Investiture; Rumen Radev (PB); Radev Government
Ballot →	8 May 2026
Required majority →	absolute majority among present MPs (115 of 230)
Yes: • Progressive Bulgaria (124)	124 / 240
No: • DB (21); • DPS (21); • PP (16); • VAZ (12)	70 / 240
Abstentions: • GERB–SDS (36)	36 / 239
Absentees: • PB (7); • GERB–SDS (3)	10 / 240
Result	Yes
Source: DNES

== See also ==
- 2018–2022 Israeli political crisis
- 2024–2025 French political crisis
