= First Donev Government =

Government of Bulgaria (2022–2023)

Donev Government
- 100th Cabinet of Bulgaria
- 2022
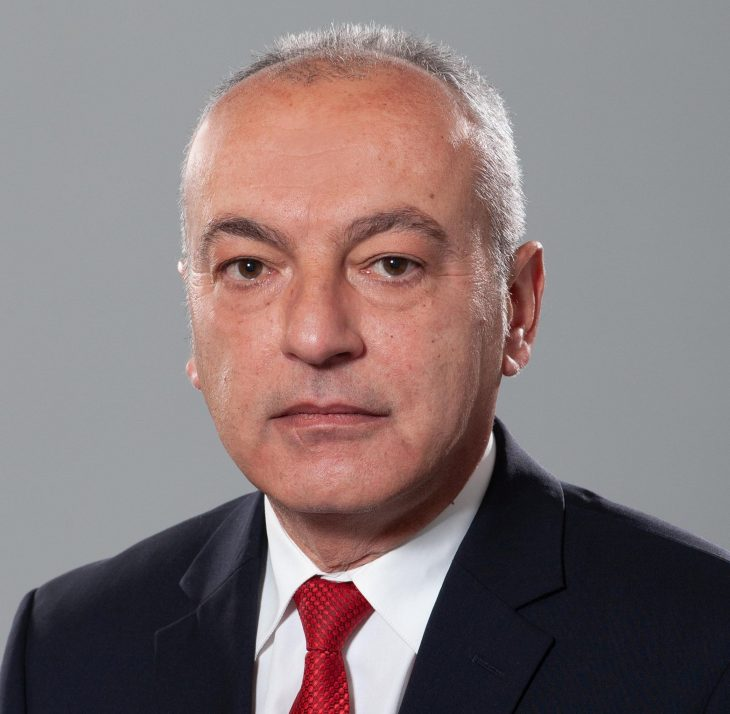
- Portrait of the Prime Minister Galab Donev
- Date formed: 2 August 2022
- Date dissolved: 2 February 2023

People and organisations
- President: Rumen Radev
- Prime Minister: Galab Donev
- Deputy Prime Ministers: Lazar Lazarov, Ind.; Hristo Alexiev, Ind.; Ivan Demerdzhiev, Ind.; Atanas Pekanov, Ind.
- No. of ministers: 20 (17 men, 3 women)
- Status in legislature: Caretaker Government

History
- Legislature term: 47th National Assembly
- Predecessor: Petkov Government
- Successor: Second Donev Government

The First Donev government was the 100th Cabinet of Bulgaria. It took office on 2 August 2022, after being nominated by President Rumen Radev to solve the political crisis that led to the fall of the Petkov Government and the calling of a snap election for October 2. It is a caretaker government chaired by prime minister Galab Donev.

== Cabinet ==
Cabinet members
Portfolio	Minister	Took office	Left office	Party
Prime Minister	Galab Donev	2 August 2022	2 February 2023	Independent
Deputy Prime Minister for Social and Policies, Labour Minister	Lazar Lazarov	2 August 2022	2 February 2023	Independent
Deputy Prime Minister for Internal Order and Security, Interior Minister	Ivan Demerdzhiev	2 August 2022	2 February 2023	Independent
Deputy Prime Minister for EU Funds Management	Atanas Pekanov	2 August 2022	2 February 2023	Independent
Finance Minister	Rositsa Atanasova Velkova-Zheleva	2 August 2022	2 February 2023	Independent
Defence Minister	Dimitar Stoyanov	2 August 2022	2 February 2023	Independent
Foreign Minister	Nikolay Milkov	2 August 2022	2 February 2023	Independent
Justice Minister	Krum Zarkov	2 August 2022	2 February 2023	BSPzB
Health Minister	Asen Medzhidiev	2 August 2022	2 February 2023	Independent
Education Minister	Sasho Penov	2 August 2022	2 February 2023	Independent
Agriculture and Foods Minister	Yavor Gechev	2 August 2022	2 February 2023	BSPzB
Deputy Prime Minister for Economic Policies and Transport and Communications Minister	Hristo Alexiev	2 August 2022	2 February 2023	Independent
Environment and Waters Minister	Rositsa Karamfilova-Blagova	2 August 2022	2 February 2023	Independent
Energy Minister	Rosen Hristov	2 August 2022	2 February 2023	Independent
Tourism Minister	Ilin Dimitrov	2 August 2022	2 February 2023	PP
Economy Minister	Nikola Stoyanov	2 August 2022	2 February 2023	Independent
Regional Development Minister	Ivan Shishkov	2 August 2022	2 February 2023	Independent
Culture Minister	Velislav Minekov	2 August 2022	2 February 2023	Independent
Youth and Sports Minister	Vesela Lecheva	2 August 2022	2 February 2023	BSPzB
Minister of e-Government	Georgi Todorov	2 August 2022	2 February 2023	Independent
Minister of Innovation and Growth	Aleksandur Pulev	2 August 2022	2 February 2023	Independent

== Tenure (2023) ==
=== Changes within the civil service ===
During the first meeting of the Cabinet, on the 4th of August, PM Donev announced the appointment of new regional executives in all 25 Bulgarian regions.

=== Action in the energy sector (August–October) ===
During the government's official swearing in ceremony on August 2, PM Donev outlined energy prices as one of the main priorities of the government.

On the 3d of August, a Crisis-Management Team was created, headed by Vice-Prime Minister for the Economy, Hristo Aleksiev, with the Minister of Energy, Rosen Hristov, categorizing the situation with energy supply in the country as "critical".

During the first meeting of the government, on the 4th of August, it was announced that the government would open auctions for potential short-term suppliers of natural gas.

On the 11th of August, the government announced a loan of 800 million Leva for the company, Bulgargaz, with half of the loan to be invested in the gas storage at Chiren and the second half was to go towards reducing the debt of the state-heating company Toplofikacia.
