= Grozdan Karadzhov =

Bulgarian politician (born 1966)

- Гроздан Караджов
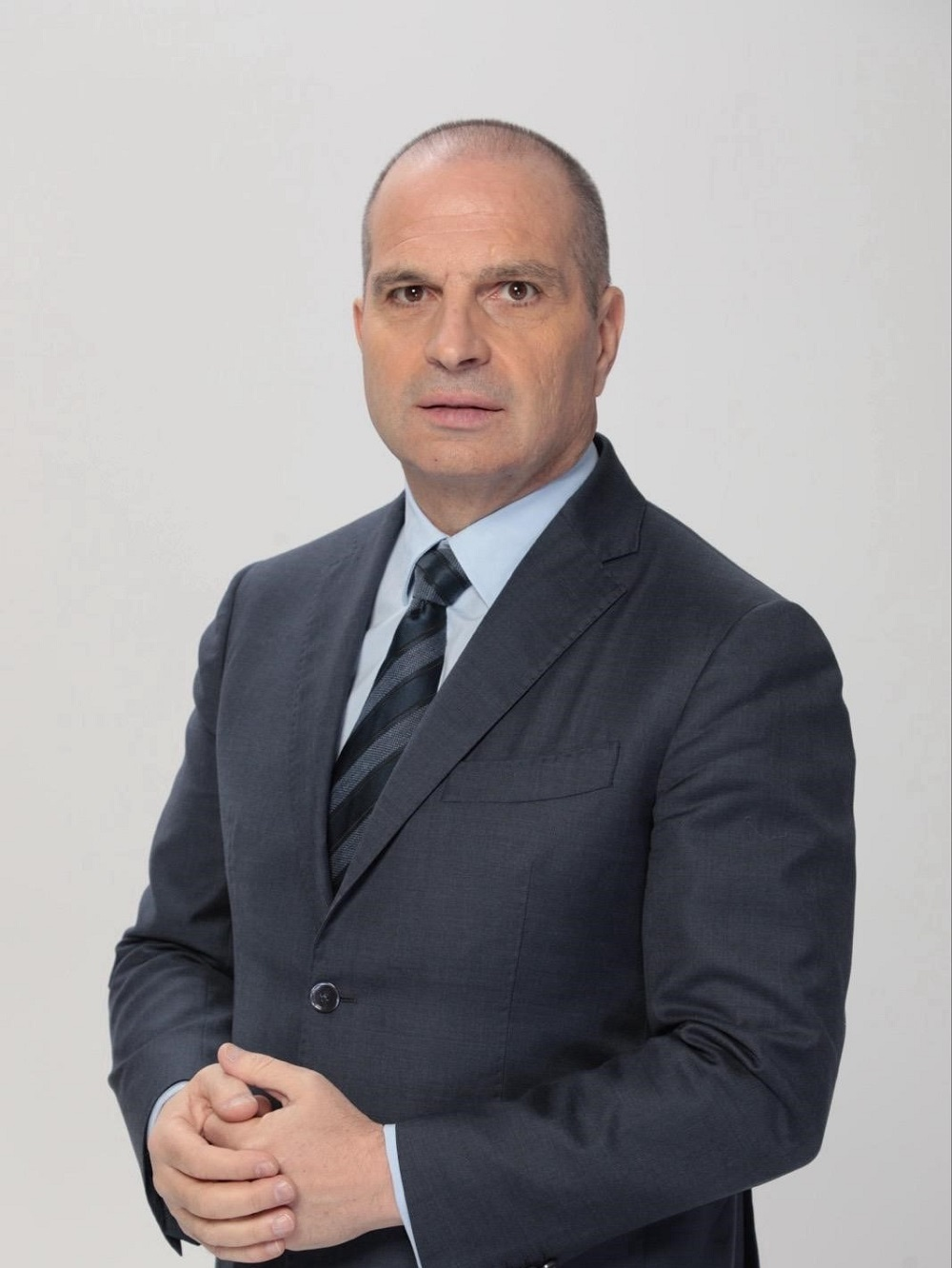
- Official portrait, 2025

Deputy Prime Minister of Bulgaria
- In office 16 January 2025 – 19 February 2026 Serving with Tomislav Donchev and Atanas Zafirov (Note: Served alongside Korneliya Ninova, Assen Vassilev, Borislav Sandov and Kalina Konstantinova from 2021 to 2022.)
- Prime Minister: Rosen Zhelyazkov
- Preceded by: Lyudmila Petkova
- In office 13 December 2021 – 2 August 2022
- Prime Minister: Kiril Petkov
- Preceded by: Galab Donev (Note: Donev, alongside Boyko Rashkov and Atanas Pekanov)
- Succeeded by: Atanas Pekanov (Note: Pekanov, alongside Ivan Demerdzhiev, Lazar Lazarov and Hristo Alexiev)

Minister of Transport and Communications
- In office 16 January 2025 – 19 February 2026
- Prime Minister: Rosen Zhelyazkov
- Preceded by: Krasimira Stoyanova

Minister of Regional Development and Public Works
- In office 13 December 2021 – 2 August 2022
- Prime Minister: Kiril Petkov
- Preceded by: Violeta Komitova
- Succeeded by: Ivan Shishkov

Member of the National Assembly
- In office 12 April 2023 – 19 June 2024
- Constituency: 16th MMC - Plovdiv
- In office 27 October 2014 – 26 January 2017
- Constituency: 24th MMC - Sofia

Personal details
- Born: Grozdan Spasov Karadzhov; 14 December 1966 (age 59) Stara Zagora, PR Bulgaria
- Party: ITN (since 2021)
- Other political affiliations: Reformist Bloc (2014–2017)
- Children: 4
- Education: Sofia University
- Occupation: Politician; lawyer

Grozdan Spasov Karadzhov (Bulgarian: Гроздан Спасов Караджов, born 14 December 1966) is a Bulgarian politician who has served as Deputy Prime Minister of Bulgaria since 2025 and from 2021 to 2022. A member of the ITN party, he is also serving as Minister of Transport. Karadzhov previously served as Minister of Regional Development from 2021 to 2022 and Member of the National Assembly from 2014 to 2017 and from 2023 to 2024.

== Biography ==
He was born 14 December 1966 in Stara Zagora. He graduated from the First English Language High School in Sofia and majored in Law at Sofia University. He specialised in business management in telecommunications when studying in Japan.

He was the chair of the Independent Student Society at the Faculty of Law at Sofia University in the 1990s. He was also a co-founder and national coordinator of the Bulgarian Association for Fair Elections. He was the program coordinator, general secretary and program director of the Open Society - Sofia.

In 1997 he became General Secretary of the Committee on Posts and Telecommunications. During Ivan Kostov's government he was Secretary General of the Ministry of Transport. Until 2004 he was a representative of the state in the management of BTC.

He was a member of the Supervisory Board of the Bulgarian Post Bank. After Ivan Kostov's term ended, Karadjov took over the management of the Democracy Party Foundation until 2004.

In the parliamentary elections in 2014 he was elected a Member of Parliament in 43 National Assembly from the list of the Republic of Bulgaria in 24 MIR Sofia. Between 27 November 2014 and 9 December 2015, he chaired the Parliamentary Committee on Transport, Information Technology and Communications.

In August 2021 he was nominated for Minister of Transport, Information Technology and Communications in the failed cabinet with a mandate from the party “There is such a people” and Prime Minister Plamen Nikolov.

After the formation of the Petkov Government following the November 2021 Bulgarian Legislative Election, he was Minister of Regional Development and Public Works and deputy Prime Minister.

Karadzhov is married, with 4 kids.
