= Second Yanev Government =

Government of Bulgaria (Sep–Dec 2021)

- 98th Cabinet of Bulgaria

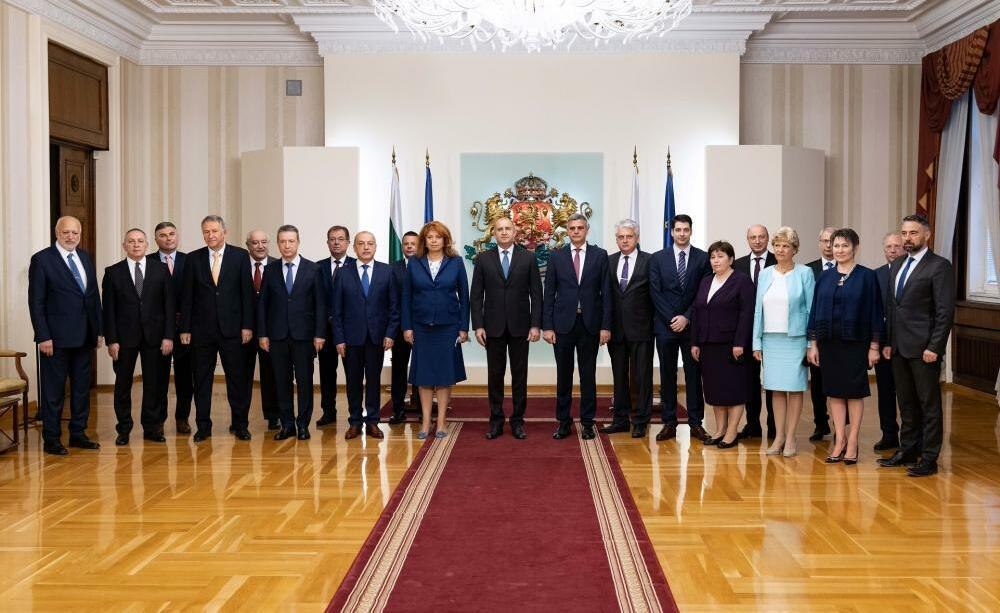
- Photo of the cabinet members
- Date formed: 16 September 2021
- Date dissolved: 13 December 2021

People and organisations
- Head of state: Rumen Radev
- Head of government: Stefan Yanev
- No. of ministers: 19
- Member party: Independents

History
- Legislature term: Caretaker government
- Predecessor: First Yanev Government
- Successor: Petkov Government

The ninety-eighth cabinet of Bulgaria was a caretaker government chaired by prime minister Stefan Yanev. It was appointed by president Rumen Radev after the July 2021 Bulgarian parliamentary election. It succeeded Yanev's first government.

== Cabinet ==
Cabinet members
Portfolio	Minister	Took office	Left office	Party
Prime Minister	Stefan Yanev	16 September 2021	13 December 2021	Independent
Deputy Prime Minister for Social and Economic Policies, Labour Minister	Galab Donev	16 September 2021	13 December 2021	Independent
Deputy Prime Minister for Internal Order and Security, Interior Minister	Boyko Rashkov	16 September 2021	13 December 2021	Independent
Deputy Prime Minister for EU Funds Management	Atanas Pekanov	16 September 2021	13 December 2021	Independent
Finance Minister	Valery Beltchev	16 September 2021	13 December 2021	Independent
Defence Minister	Georgi Panayotov	16 September 2021	13 December 2021	Independent
Foreign Minister	Svetlan Stoev	16 September 2021	13 December 2021	Independent
Justice Minister	Yanaki Stoilov	16 September 2021	13 December 2021	Independent
Health Minister	Stoicho Katsarov	16 September 2021	13 December 2021	Independent
Education Minister	Nikolai Denkov	16 September 2021	13 December 2021	Independent
Agriculture and Foods Minister	Hristo Bozoukov	16 September 2021	13 December 2021	Independent
Transport, Information Technologies and Communications Minister	Hristo Alexiev	16 September 2021	13 December 2021	Independent
Environment and Waters Minister	Assen Lichev	16 September 2021	13 December 2021	Independent
Energy Minister	Andrei Zhivkov	16 September 2021	13 December 2021	Independent
Tourism Minister	Stela Baltova	16 September 2021	13 December 2021	Independent
Economy Minister	Daniela Vezieva	16 September 2021	13 December 2021	Independent
Regional Development Minister	Violeta Komitova	16 September 2021	13 December 2021	Independent
Culture Minister	Velislav Minekov	16 September 2021	13 December 2021	Independent
Youth and Sports Minister	Andrei Kouzmanov	16 September 2021	13 December 2021	Independent
