= Radev government =

Government of Bulgaria since 2026

Radev Government
- 107th Cabinet of Bulgaria
- 2026–present
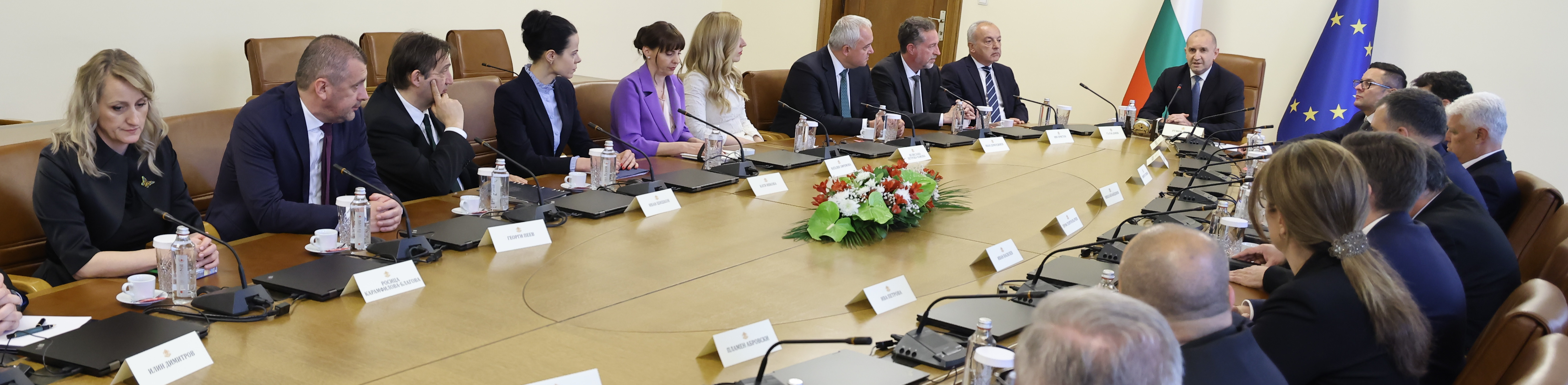
- Radev holding his first cabinet meeting
- Date formed: 8 May 2026

People and organisations
- President: Iliana Iotova
- Prime Minister: Rumen Radev
- Deputy Prime Minister: Galab Donev; Aleksandur Pulev; Ivo Hristov; Atanas Pekanov
- No. of ministers: 19
- Ministers removed: 0
- Total no. of members: 19
- Member parties: PB
- Status in legislature: Majority government
- Opposition parties: GERB–SDS; DB; DPS–NN; PP; Revival

History
- Election: 2026 Bulgarian parliamentary election
- Legislature term: 52nd National Assembly
- Predecessor: Gyurov

The Radev government is the 107th cabinet of Bulgaria. It was approved by the National Assembly and sworn in on 8 May 2026. The cabinet is a majority government formed by Progressive Bulgaria, after their victory in the 2026 Bulgarian parliamentary election. The government was the first single-party government in Bulgaria's modern history since 2013, and the first to have a majority in the National Assembly since 1997. It was also the first government in Bulgaria's modern history to be led by a former President.

== Cabinet ==
The following is the composition of the Radev government.

Portfolio	Minister	Took office	Left office	Party
Prime Minister	Rumen Radev	8 May 2026	Incumbent	PB
Deputy Prime Minister and Minister of Finance	Galab Donev	8 May 2026	Incumbent	PB
Deputy Prime Minister and Minister of Economy, Investments and Industry	Aleksandur Pulev	8 May 2026	Incumbent	PB
Deputy Prime Minister	Ivo Hristov	8 May 2026	Incumbent	PB
Deputy Prime Minister	Atanas Pekanov	8 May 2026	Incumbent	Independent
Minister of the Interior	Ivan Demerdzhiev	8 May 2026	Incumbent	PB
Minister of Defense	Dimitar Stoyanov	8 May 2026	Incumbent	PB
Minister of Foreign Affairs	Velislava Petrova-Chamova	8 May 2026	Incumbent	Independent
Minister of Justice	Nikolay Naydenov	8 May 2026	Incumbent	Independent
Minister of Labour and Social Affairs	Nataliya Efremova	8 May 2026	Incumbent	Independent
Minister of Education and Science	Georgi Vulchev	8 May 2026	Incumbent	Independent
Minister of Healthcare	Katya Ivkova	8 May 2026	Incumbent	Independent
Minister of Innovation and Digital Transformation	Ivan Vassilev	8 May 2026	Incumbent	PB
Minister of Regional Development and Public Works	Ivan Shishkov	8 May 2026	Incumbent	PB
Minister of Energy	Iva Petrova	8 May 2026	Incumbent	Independent
Minister of Transport and Communications	Georgi Peev	8 May 2026	Incumbent	Independent
Minister of Agriculture and Food	Plamen Abrovski	8 May 2026	Incumbent	Independent
Minister of Environment and Water	Rositsa Karamfilova	8 May 2026	Incumbent	PB
Minister of Culture	Evtim Miloshev	8 May 2026	Incumbent	Independent
Minister of Tourism	Ilin Dimitrov	8 May 2026	Incumbent	PB
Minister of Youth and Sport	Encho Keryazov	8 May 2026	Incumbent	Independent
