= Korneliya Ninova =

Bulgarian politician

Cornelia Ninova
- Корнелия Нинова
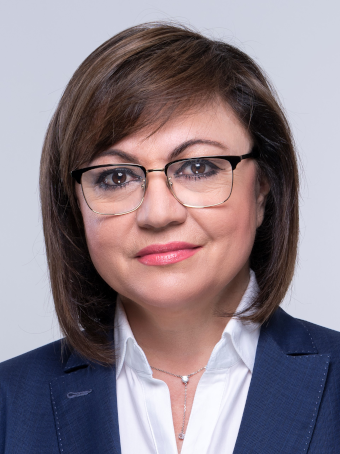
- Ninova in 2022

Deputy Prime Minister of Bulgaria
- In office 13 December 2021 – 2 August 2022 Serving with Kalina Konstantinova, Assen Vassilev, Grozdan Karadzhov and Borislav Sandov
- Prime Minister: Kiril Petkov
- Preceded by: Galab Donev; Boyko Rashkov; Atanas Pekanov
- Succeeded by: Ivan Demerdzhiev; Lazar Lazarov; Atanas Pekanov; Hristo Alexiev

Minister of Economy and Industry
- In office 13 December 2021 – 2 August 2022
- Prime Minister: Kiril Petkov
- Preceded by: Daniela Vezieva
- Succeeded by: Nikola Stoyanov

Leader of the Bulgarian Socialist Party
- In office 8 May 2016 – 15 June 2024
- Preceded by: Mihail Mikov
- Succeeded by: Atanas Zafirov (acting)

Member of the National Assembly
- In office 19 June 2024 – 10 November 2024
- Constituency: 1st MMC – Blagoevgrad
- In office 14 July 2009 – 13 December 2021
- Constituency: 1st MMC – Blagoevgrad (2009–2013); 26th MMC – Sofia (2013–2017); 25th MMC – Sofia (2017–2021); 25th MMC – Sofia (2021–2024)

Deputy Minister of Economy, Energy and Tourism
- In office 17 August 2005 – 18 July 2007
- Prime Minister: Sergey Stanishev
- Minister: Rumen Ovcharov

Personal details
- Born: Korneliya Petrova Ninova; 16 January 1969 (age 57) Krushovitsa, Dolni Dabnik, PR Bulgaria
- Party: Nepokorna Bulgaria (from 2025)
- Other political affiliations: BSP (2003–2024)
- Children: 1
- Education: Sofia University
- Occupation: Politician; lawyer

Korneliya Petrova Ninova (Bulgarian: Корнелия Петрова Нинова [korˈnɛlijɐ ˈninova]) is a Bulgarian politician who was a leader and member of Parliament of the Bulgarian Socialist Party (BSP). She was chairwoman of the BSP from 2016 to 2024. In April 2025, she was elected leader of Nepokorna Bulgaria, a centre-left political movement established in December 2024.

== Biography ==
Ninova was born on 16 January 1969 in Krushovitsa village, Miziya municipality, Vratsa district, People's Republic of Bulgaria. She graduated from the Law Faculty of Sofia University "St. Kliment Ohridski". In 1995, she worked in the Sofia City Court as a trainee judge, and in the period from 1995 to 1996, she was legal adviser of Sofia Municipality. From 1996 to 1997, Korneliya Ninova was an investigator in the Sofia Investigation Service. In the period from March to August 1997, she was counsel of BTC. Between 1997 and 2005, she was the CEO of Technoimpex JSC.

From September 2005 to March 2007, Ninova was Deputy Minister of Economy and Energy in foreign economic policy. In December 2005, she was appointed as Chairperson of the Board of Bulgartabac Holding AD. In 2007, she was removed from the management of the company and was investigated on allegations of crime against justice. Ninova was removed by a decision of Prime Minister Sergey Stanishev from the position of deputy minister in May 2007.

On 8 May 2016, Ninova was elected as chairperson of the BSP with 395 votes against 349 votes for the outgoing president Mihail Mikov. In a TV interview on 23 April 2017, Ninova made the statement that British Conservative Party prime ministers Margaret Thatcher and Theresa May were her "favourite politicians", highly unusual for a socialist politician. Ninova was reportedly in conflict with former BSP secretary and previous Party of European Socialists (PES) president Sergei Stanishev.

On 28 May 2019, Ninova resigned as leader of the BSP. This was done as the party felt that it had lost the 2019 European Parliament election in Bulgaria under her leadership, although it managed to muster both higher electoral support and an increase in the number of MEPs in comparison to the previous election. She withdrew her resignation shortly thereafter at the BSP's congress, thus remaining as the party's leader. Following the bad results of her party's coalition (BSP for Bulgaria) in the 2021 Bulgarian general election. Ninova once again resigned from her leadership positions both in the BSP and the coalition.

== Parliamentary activity ==
- Parliamentary Group of Coalition for Bulgaria (14 July 2009 –)
- Internal Security and Public Order (29 July 2009 –)
- Committee on Economic Policy, Energy and Tourism (30 July 2009 –)
- Delegation to the Parliamentary Assembly of the Council of Europe (Deputy Representative, 4 September 2009 – 11 January 2012)
- Friendship group Bulgaria – Italy (23 October 2009 –)
- Friendship group Bulgaria – Morocco (Deputy Chairman, 23 October 2009 –)
- Friendship group Bulgaria – Russia (23 October 2009 –)
- Friendship group Bulgaria – France (23 October 2009 –)
- Bills introduced: Bill to the Law on Privatization, Bill amending the Law on Income Tax of Individuals, Bill amending the Law on Medical Institutions

Party political offices
Preceded by Mihail Mikov	Leader of the Socialist Party; 2016–2024	Succeeded by Atanas Zafirov
