= Ivan Demerdzhiev =

Bulgarian politician (born 1975)

- Иван Демерджиев
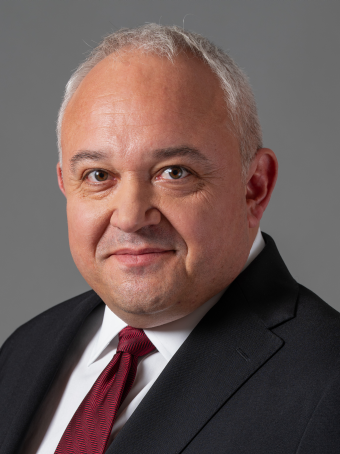
- Official portrait, 2026

Deputy Prime Minister of Bulgaria (Note: Served alongside Atanas Pekanov, Lazar Lazarov and Hristo Alexiev.)
- In office 2 August 2022 – 6 June 2023
- Prime Minister: Galab Donev
- Preceded by: Assen Vassilev (Note: Vassilev, alongside Korneliya Ninova, Grozdan Karadjov, Kalina Konstantinova and Borislav Sandov.)
- Succeeded by: Mariya Gabriel

Minister of Interior
- Incumbent
- Assumed office 8 May 2026
- Prime Minister: Rumen Radev
- Preceded by: Emil Dechev
- In office 2 August 2022 – 6 June 2023
- Prime Minister: Galab Donev
- Preceded by: Boyko Rashkov
- Succeeded by: Kalin Stoyanov

Minister of Justice
- In office 29 October 2021 – 13 December 2021
- Prime Minister: Stefan Yanev
- Preceded by: Yanaki Stoilov
- Succeeded by: Nadezhda Yordanova

Deputy Minister of Justice
- In office 12 May 2021 – 29 October 2021
- Prime Minister: Stefan Yanev
- Minister: Yanaki Stoilov

Personal details
- Born: Ivan Petev Demerdzhiev; 12 December 1975 (age 50) Plovdiv, PR Bulgaria
- Party: Progressive Bulgaria
- Other political affiliations: Independent (until 2026)
- Children: 2
- Education: Plovdiv University
- Occupation: Politician; jurist

Ivan Petev Demerdzhiev (Bulgarian: Иван Петев Демерджиев, born 12 December 1975) is a Bulgarian politician who is currently serving as Minister of Interior. Previously an independent politician, he served in four caretaker governments during the Bulgarian political crisis. He is married and has two children.
