= First Yanev Government =

Government of Bulgaria (May–Sep 2021)

- 97th Cabinet of Bulgaria

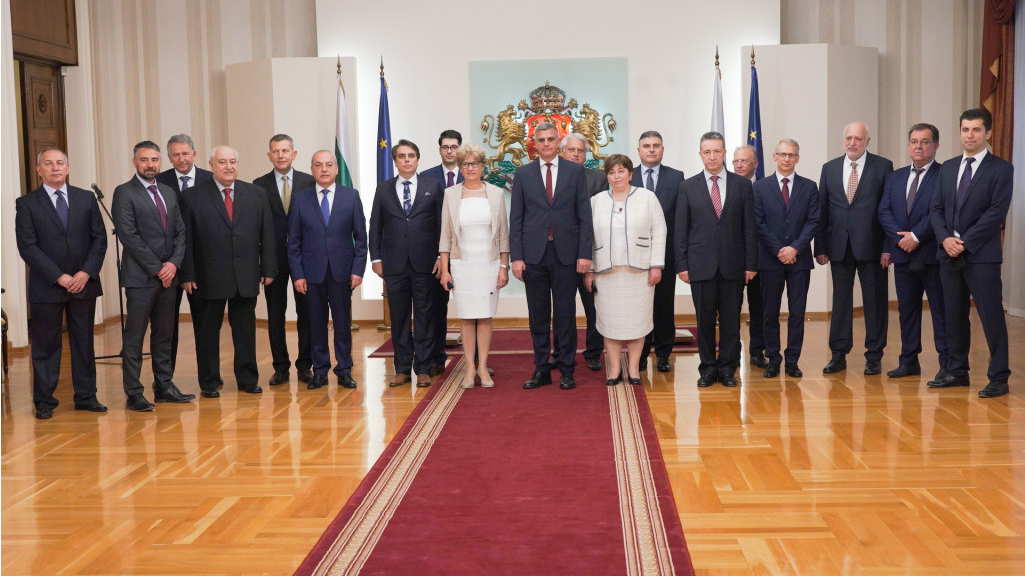
- Photo of the cabinet members
- Date formed: 12 May 2021
- Date dissolved: 16 September 2021

People and organisations
- Head of state: Rumen Radev
- Head of government: Stefan Yanev
- No. of ministers: 19
- Member party: Independents

History
- Legislature term: Caretaker government
- Predecessor: Third Borisov Government
- Successor: Second Yanev Government

The First Yanev Government was the ninety-seventh Cabinet of Bulgaria. It took office on 12 May 2021. It was a caretaker government chaired by prime minister Stefan Yanev. It was appointed by president Rumen Radev following the April 2021 Bulgarian parliamentary election. It was succeeded by Yanev's second government.

== Cabinet ==
Cabinet members
| Portfolio | Minister | Took office | Left office | Party |
|---|---|---|---|---|
| Prime Minister | Stefan Yanev | 12 May 2021 | 16 September 2021 | Independent |
| Deputy Prime Minister for Social and Economic Policies, Labour Minister | Galab Donev | 12 May 2021 | 16 September 2021 | Independent |
| Deputy Prime Minister for Internal Order and Security, Interior Minister | Boyko Rashkov | 12 May 2021 | 16 September 2021 | Independent |
| Deputy Prime Minister for EU Funds Management | Atanas Pekanov | 12 May 2021 | 16 September 2021 | Independent |
| Finance Minister | Assen Vassilev | 12 May 2021 | 16 September 2021 | Independent |
| Defence Minister | Georgi Panayotov | 12 May 2021 | 16 September 2021 | Independent |
| Foreign Minister | Svetlan Stoev | 12 May 2021 | 16 September 2021 | Independent |
| Justice Minister | Yanaki Stoilov | 12 May 2021 | 16 September 2021 | BSP |
| Health Minister | Stoicho Katsarov | 12 May 2021 | 16 September 2021 | Independent |
| Education Minister | Nikolai Denkov | 12 May 2021 | 16 September 2021 | Independent |
| Agriculture and Foods Minister | Hristo Bozukov | 12 May 2021 | 16 September 2021 | Independent |
| Transport, Information Technologies and Communications Minister | Georgi Todorov | 12 May 2021 | 16 September 2021 | Independent |
| Environment and Waters Minister | Asen Lichev | 12 May 2021 | 16 September 2021 | Independent |
| Energy Minister | Andrei Zhivkov | 12 May 2021 | 16 September 2021 | Independent |
| Tourism Minister | Stela Baltova | 12 May 2021 | 16 September 2021 | Independent |
| Economy Minister | Kiril Petkov | 12 May 2021 | 16 September 2021 | Independent |
| Regional Development Minister | Violeta Komitova | 12 May 2021 | 16 September 2021 | Independent |
| Culture Minister | Velislav Minekov | 12 May 2021 | 16 September 2021 | Independent |
| Youth and Sports Minister | Andrei Kuzmanov | 12 May 2021 | 16 September 2021 | Independent |
