= Tomislav Donchev =

Bulgarian politician

- Томислав Дончев
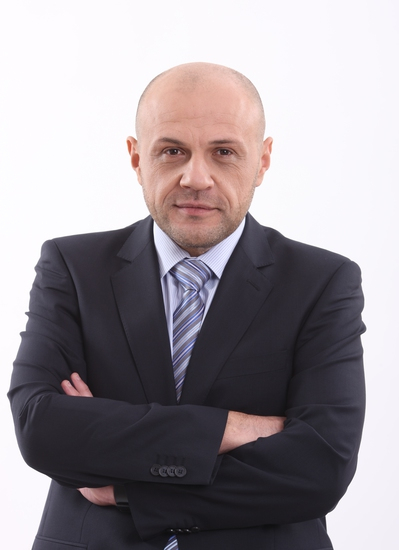

Deputy Prime Minister of Bulgaria
- In office 16 January 2025 – 19 February 2026 Serving with Atanas Zafirov and Grozdan Karadzhov (Note: Served alongside Mariyana Nikolova, Krasimir Karakachanov and Ekaterina Zaharieva from 2017 to 2021. Served alongside Rumyana Bachvarova, Meglena Kuneva and Ivaylo Kalfin from 2014 to 2017.)
- Prime Minister: Rosen Zhelyazkov
- Preceded by: Lyudmila Petkova
- Succeeded by: Irena Mladenova
- In office 4 May 2017 – 12 May 2021
- Prime Minister: Boyko Borisov
- Preceded by: Stefan Yanev (Note: Yanev, alongside Ilko Semerdzhiev.)
- Succeeded by: Galab Donev (Note: Donev, alongside Boyko Rashkov and Atanas Pekanov.)
- In office 7 November 2014 – 22 January 2017
- Prime Minister: Boyko Borisov
- Preceded by: Ekaterina Zaharieva (Note: Zaharieva, alongside Hristo Ivanov and Yordan Hristoskov.)
- Succeeded by: Stefan Yanev (Note: Yanev, alongside Ilko Semerdzhiev.)

Minister of Innovation and Growth
- In office 16 January 2025 – 19 February 2026
- Prime Minister: Rosen Zhelyazkov
- Preceded by: Rosen Karadimov
Other executive offices
Minister without portfolio
In office 18 March 2010 – 13 March 2013
Prime Minister	Boyko Borisov
Preceded by	Bozhidar Dimitrov
Succeeded by	Iliyana Tsanova
Mayor of Gabrovo
In office 9 November 2007 – 18 March 2010
Preceded by	Bogomil Belchev
Succeeded by	Nikolay Sirakov
Legislative offices
Member of the National Assembly
In office 21 July 2021 – 16 January 2025
Constituency	7th MMC - Gabrovo
Member of the European Parliament for Bulgaria
In office 1 July 2014 – 6 November 2014
Preceded by	Preslav Borissov
Succeeded by	Andrey Novakov

Personal details
- Born: Tomislav Peykov Donchev; 6 August 1973 (age 52) Gabrovo, PR Bulgaria
- Party: GERB
- Children: 1
- Occupation: Politician; consultant; teacher

Tomislav Peykov Donchev (Bulgarian: Томислав Пейков Дончев; born 6 August 1973) is a Bulgarian politician who served as Deputy Prime Minister of Bulgaria. A member of the GERB party, he previously held that position on two occasions from 2014 to 2021. He also served as Minister without portfolio from 2010 to 2013 and Mayor of Gabrovo from 2007 to 2010. Donchev was also a member of both the National Assembly and the European Parliament
