= Mariyana Nikolova =

Bulgarian politician

- Марияна Николова
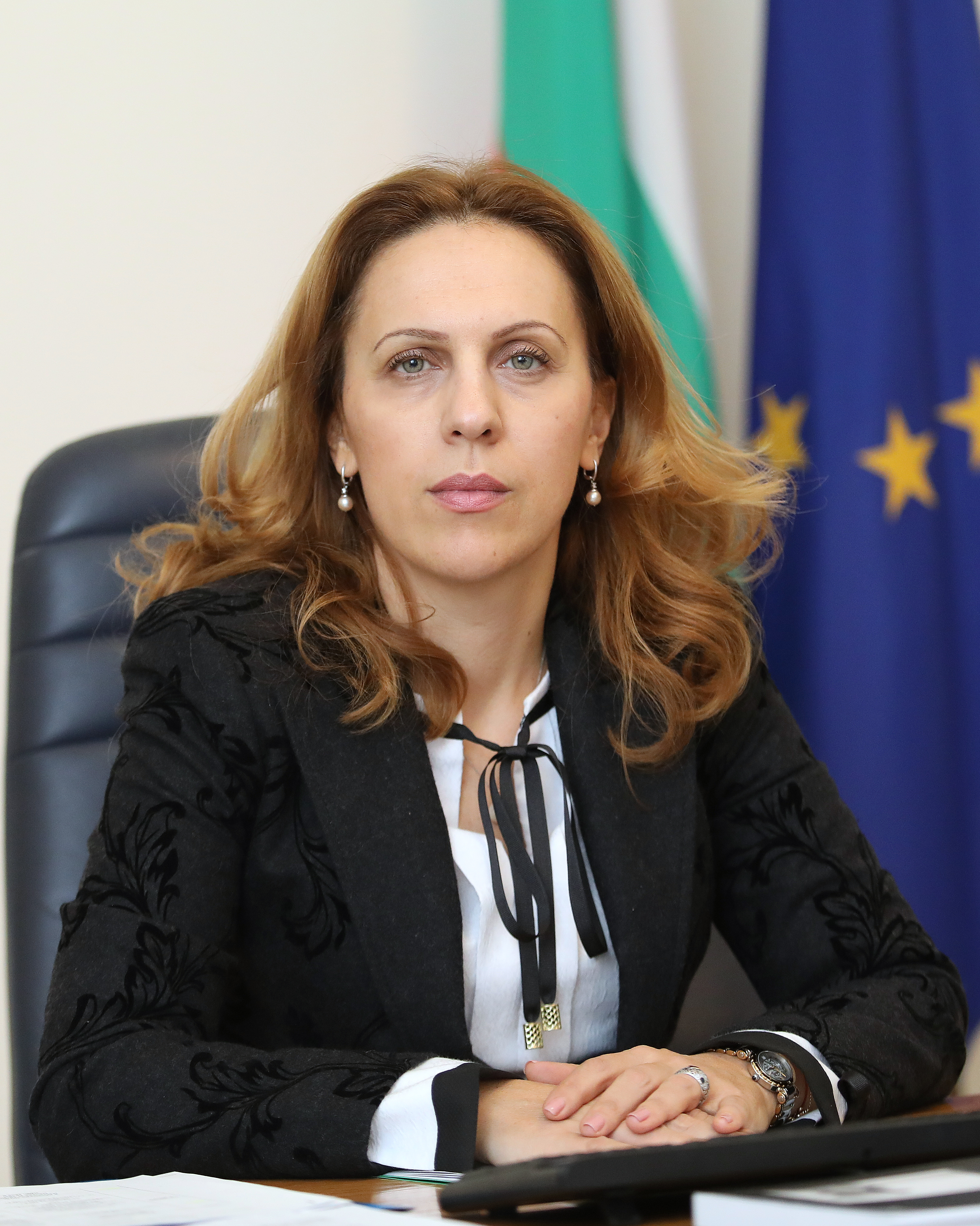
- Official portrait, 2018

Deputy Prime Minister of Bulgaria
- In office 21 November 2018 – 12 May 2021 Serving with Tomislav Donchev, Krasimir Karakachanov and Ekaterina Zakharieva
- Prime Minister: Boyko Borisov
- Preceded by: Valeri Simeonov
- Succeeded by: Galab Donev; Boyko Rashkov; Atanas Pekanov

Minister of Tourism
- In office 24 July 2020 – 12 May 2021
- Prime Minister: Boyko Borisov
- Preceded by: Nikolina Angelkova
- Succeeded by: Stela Baltova

Personal details
- Born: 16 September 1975 (age 50) Botevgrad, PR Bulgaria
- Party: NFSB
- Education: New Bulgarian University; Sofia University; Veliko Tarnovo University

Mariyana Nikolova (born 16 September 1975) is a Bulgarian politician was the country's Minister for Tourism from July 2020 to May 2021 and Deputy Prime Minister from November 2018 to May 2021.

== Early life and education ==
Mariyana Nikolova was born on 16 September 1975 in Botevgrad. She has master's degrees in Law from the New Bulgarian University, in Public Administration from Sofia University and in Economic Management from Veliko Tarnovo University.

== Career ==
Nikolova was a lawyer with the Sofia Bar Association and was involved in drafting administrative legislation. She worked for the Ministry for the State Administration and Administrative Reform, Ministry of Agriculture and Food, and Ministry of Economy.

In May 2017, Nikolova became chief of staff to the Deputy Prime Minister for Economic and Demographic Policy. She was also at lecturer at the Public Administration Institute.

On 21 November 2018 Nikolova was elected Deputy Prime Minister for Economic and Demographic Policy by the National Assembly after the resignation of Valeri Simeonov. In August 2019 she took charge of cybersecurity as well. On 24 July 2020, she was also appointed Minister of Tourism, the first time this portfolio has been held at such a high level. She said her task was to ensure the continued functioning of tourism despite travel restrictions related to the COVID-19 pandemic, with a focus on stimulating domestic tourism.
