= Assen Vassilev =

Bulgarian politician (born 1977)

- Асен Василев
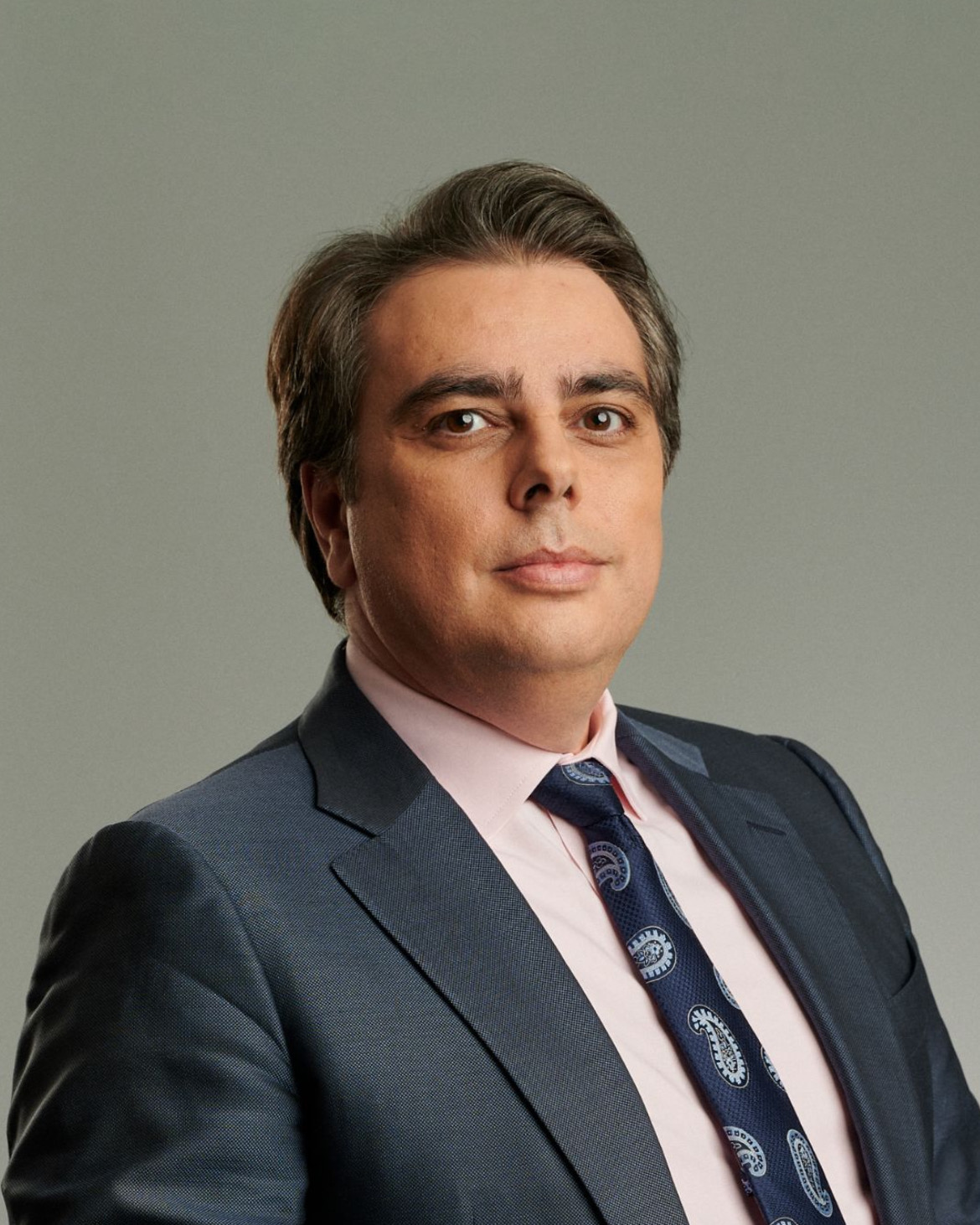
- Vassilev in 2024

Deputy Prime Minister of Bulgaria (Note: Served alongside Kalina Konstantinova, Korneliya Ninova, Grozdan Karadzhov and Borislav Sandov)
- In office 13 December 2021 – 2 August 2022
- Prime Minister: Kiril Petkov
- Preceded by: Galab Donev (Note: Shared between Donev, Boyko Rashkov and Atanas Pekanov)
- Succeeded by: Atanas Pekanov (Note: Shared between Pekanov, Ivan Demerdzhiev, Lazar Lazarov and Hristo Alexiev)

Minister of Finance
- In office 6 June 2023 – 9 April 2024
- Prime Minister: Nikolai Denkov
- Preceded by: Rositsa Velkova
- Succeeded by: Lyudmila Petkova
- In office 13 December 2021 – 2 August 2022
- Prime Minister: Kiril Petkov
- Preceded by: Valery Beltchev
- Succeeded by: Rositsa Velkova
- In office 12 May 2021 – 16 September 2021
- Prime Minister: Stefan Yanev
- Preceded by: Kiril Ananiev
- Succeeded by: Valery Beltchev

Member of the National Assembly
- Incumbent
- Assumed office 9 April 2024
- Constituency: 29th MMC - Haskovo
- In office 19 October 2022 – 6 June 2023
- Constituency: 29th MMC - Haskovo

Leader of We Continue the Change (Note: Served alongside Kiril Petkov until June 2025 and as the sole leader since September 2025.)
- Incumbent
- Assumed office 19 September 2021
- Preceded by: Position established

Minister of Economy, Energy and Tourism
- In office 13 March 2013 – 29 May 2013
- Prime Minister: Marin Raykov
- Preceded by: Delyan Dobrev
- Succeeded by: Dragomir Stoynev

Personal details
- Born: Assen Vaskov Vassilev; 9 September 1977 (age 49) Haskovo, PR Bulgaria
- Party: PP
- Education: Harvard University
- Occupation: Politician; economist; entrepreneur

Assen Vaskov Vassilev (Bulgarian: Асен Васков Василев [ɐˈsɛn vɐˈsiɫɛf]; born 9 September 1977) is a Bulgarian politician and economist who served as Deputy Prime Minister of Bulgaria from 2021 to 2022 and as Minister of Finance on three occasions from 2021 to 2024. A member of the PP party, which he co-founded with Kiril Petkov and currently leads on his own after Petkov’s resignation. He is currently serving as Member of the National Assembly.

== Education ==
Vassilev earned a degree in economics from Harvard University in 2000 and continued studies at Harvard Business School.

== Professional career ==
Vassilev is a co-founder and president of Everbeard, an airline ticket pricing company. It is partly funded by the Singapore National Research Fund and the first Skype investor.

Vassilev was the co-founder and director of the Centre for Economic Strategy and Competitiveness. He is a lecturer in the Program for Economic Growth and Development, a branch of Sofia University “St. Kliment Ohridski” and with the Centre for Strategy and Competitiveness of Harvard Business School.

From 1999 to 2004, Vassilev worked as a consultant for Monitor Group in the US, Canada, Europe, and South Africa. He managed marketing and strategic development projects for large international companies in the fields of telecommunications, energy, mining, insurance, and several major consumer goods manufacturers.

== Political career ==
In 2013 Vassilev was Minister of Economy, Energy and Tourism in the caretaker government of Marin Raykov. From 12 May to 16 September 2021, he was Minister of Finance in the caretaker government of Stefan Yanev.

On 19 September 2021, together with Kiril Petkov, Vassilev presented his new political project “We continue the change”. He was the leader of the party list in Haskovo and Sofia 23 for the 2021 Bulgarian general election on 14 November. The party won the most seats in the new parliament and formed a coalition government on 13 December 2021.

Vassilev became Deputy Prime Minister and Minister of Finance in the short-lived Petkov government.

The Petkov government’s mandate ended in late June 2022 after Prime Minister Kiril Petkov resigned following a no-confidence vote, and on 1 July President Rumen Radev asked Vassilev to form a new government.

One week later, as prescribed by the constitution, Vassilev informed the president that his party only had the support of 117 members, falling four short of the majority. “Unfortunately, we failed to gather enough support to implement the politics that our… government would have wanted to push through. We could not get the support needed to rid Bulgaria of corruption and make the state work for the people, instead of channelling taxpayers’ money into a few select companies that can use it to corrupt the political class. We hope that in the next elections, the additional four deputies will be elected by the people.”

In May 2024 Vassilev became embroiled in a scandal revealed when someone leaked wiretaps of conversations that should have remained private.

== Other activities ==
- European Bank for Reconstruction and Development (EBRD), Ex-officio Member of the Board of Governors (since 2021)

=== Alleged Contacts with Persons Accused of Smuggling ===
In 2024, Assen Vassilev was accused of having been visited by Marin and Stefan Dimitrov, under investigation for smuggling tobacco products since 2023, on multiple occasions while in the office of Finance Minister. These accusations are based on statements by an employee of the Ministry's security firm and are not backed by official visitor logs or video evidence.

=== Lukoil refinery derogation ===
Finance Minister Assen Vassilev was the key figure who requested an EU derogation in 2022 allowing the Lukoil Neftohim Burgas refinery to continue processing Russian-origin oil and selling its products—under specific conditions—within the European Union. He threatened to veto the EU’s oil sanctions package unless Bulgaria secured this exemption, arguing it was essential for national energy security and ensured the refinery could operate smoothly.

In 2023, opposition leaders brought a case to the General prosecutor’s office over alleged bribe payments from the Russian oil company. In 2024 Parliament cut the derogation short.

=== Customs smuggling bribes ===
In November 2024, Petya Bankova, the former Customs Agency director, testified in court that Assen Vassilev, who was then finance minister, orchestrated smuggling operations and was the final recipient of large bribes of "hundreds of thousands of leva" from smugglers, including an alleged 120,000 leva per truck of 'vapes'.
