= Lazar Lazarov =

Bulgarian politician (born 1970)

- Лазар Лазаров
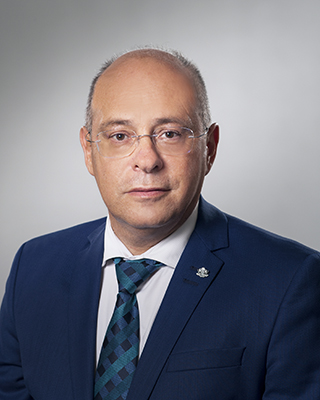
- Official portrait, 2022

Deputy Prime Minister of Bulgaria
- In office 2 August 2022 – 6 June 2023 Serving with Atanas Pekanov, Hristo Alexiev and Ivan Demerdzhiev
- Prime Minister: Galab Donev
- Preceded by: Assen Vassilev; Grozdan Karadjov; Korneliya Ninova; Kalina Konstantinova; Borislav Sandov
- Succeeded by: Mariya Gabriel

Minister of Labour and Social Policy
- In office 2 August 2022 – 6 June 2023
- Prime Minister: Galab Donev
- Preceded by: Georgi Gyokov
- Succeeded by: Ivanka Shalapatova

Personal details
- Born: 18 March 1970 (age 56) Sofia, PR Bulgaria
- Party: Independent
- Education: University of National and World Economy
- Occupation: Economist; politician

Lazar Manolov Lazarov is a Bulgarian politician who served as the Deputy Prime Minister and Minister of Labour and Social Policy in two consecutive caretaker governments from 2022 to 2023.

A political independent, he previously held various positions within the Ministry of Labour and Social Policy.
