= Kalina Konstantinova =

Bulgarian entrepreneur and politician

- Калина Константинова
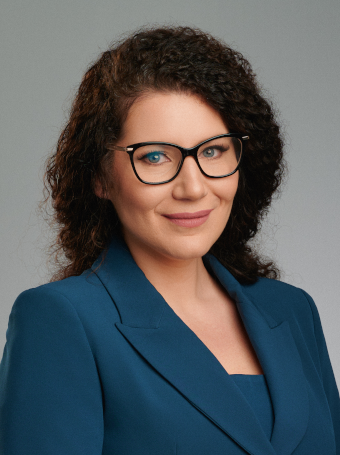
- Official portrait, 2023

Member of the National Assembly
- Incumbent
- Assumed office 19 October 2022
- Constituency: 25th MMC - Sofia

Deputy Prime Minister of Bulgaria
- In office 13 December 2021 – 2 August 2022
- Prime Minister: Kiril Petkov
- Preceded by: Galab Donev; Atanas Pekanov; Boyko Rashkov
- Succeeded by: Atanas Pekanov; Ivan Demerdzhiev

Deputy Minister of Economy and Industry
- In office 12 May 2021 – 16 September 2021
- Prime Minister: Stefan Yanev
- Minister: Kiril Petkov
- Preceded by: Lachezar Borisov
- Succeeded by: Ivelina Peneva

Personal details
- Born: Kalina Borislavova Konstantinova; 18 May 1984 (age 41) Sofia, PR Bulgaria
- Party: We Continue the Change
- Children: 1
- Education: Lycée Français de Sofia
- Alma mater: Bard College; London School of Economics
- Occupation: politician; economist; entrepreneur

Kalina Borislavova Konstantinova (Bulgarian: Калина Бориславова Константинова; born 18 May 1984) is a Bulgarian entrepreneur and politician. She was the Deputy Prime Minister for Good Governance.

== Biography ==
Kalina Kostantinova was born in Sofia, Bulgaria on 18 May 1984. She studied at Lycée Français de Sofia and after that graduated from Bard College specialising in Economics. Konstantinova holds a master's degree in Sustainable development from the London School of Economics.. Deputy Minister of Economy In office from 12 May 2021 – 16 September 2021 and Deputy Prime Minister for Effective Government in Government of Kiril Petkov from 13 December 2021 - 2 August 2022.
