= Georgi Klissurski =

Bulgarian politician (born 1991)

- Георги Клисурски
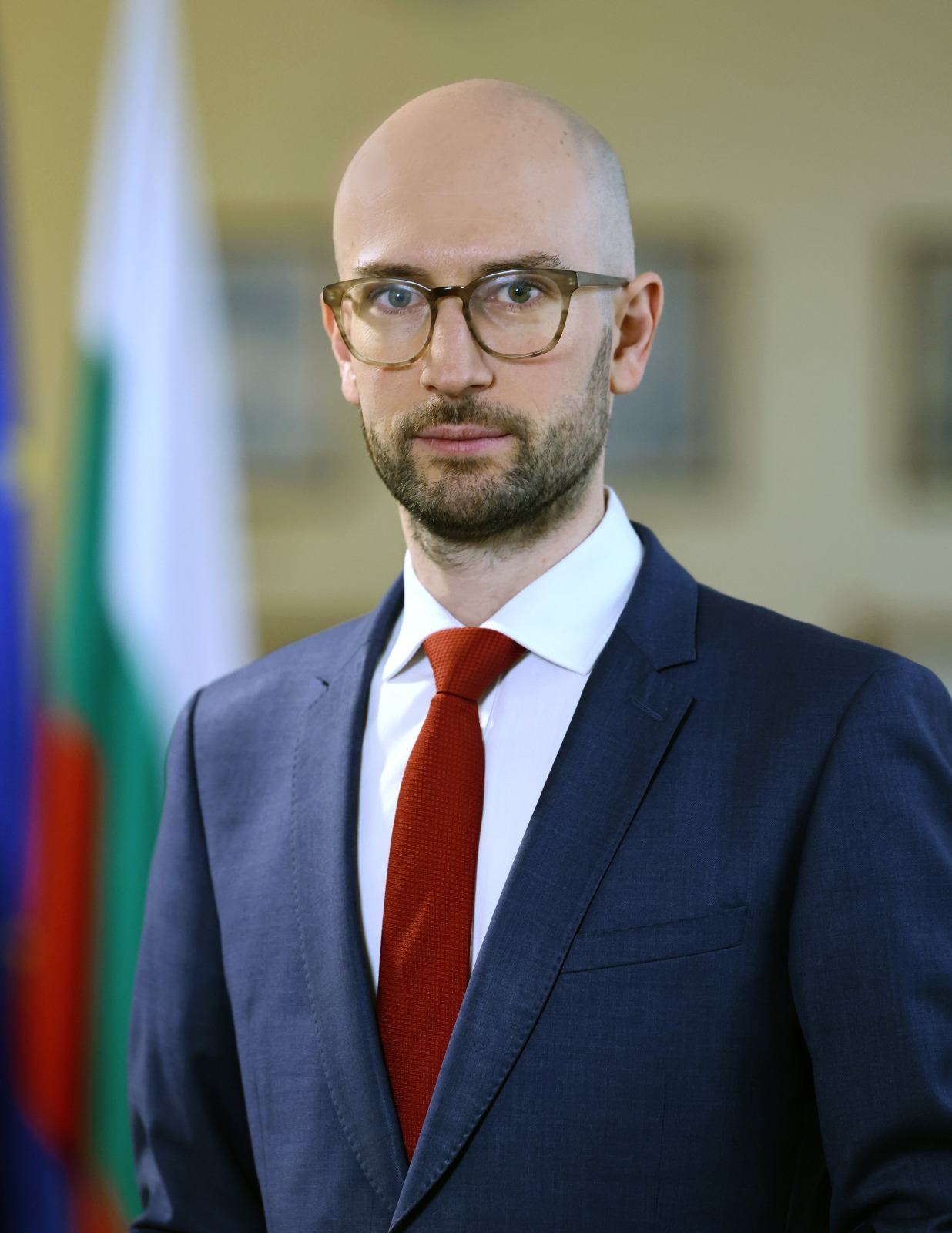
- Official portrait, 2026

Minister of Finance
- In office 19 February 2026 – 8 May 2026
- Prime Minister: Andrey Gyurov
- Preceded by: Temenuzhka Petkova
- Succeeded by: Galab Donev

Personal details
- Born: 17 January 1991 (age 35)
- Party: Independent
- Education: Dartmouth College (BA); Wharton School (MBA); Harvard Kennedy School (MPA)

Georgi Markov Klissurski (Bulgarian: Георги Марков Клисурски; born 17 January 1991) is a Bulgarian politician serving as minister of finance since 2026. From 2023 to 2024, he served as deputy minister of finance.
