= Lyudmila Petkova =

Bulgarian politician (born 1967)

- Людмила Петкова
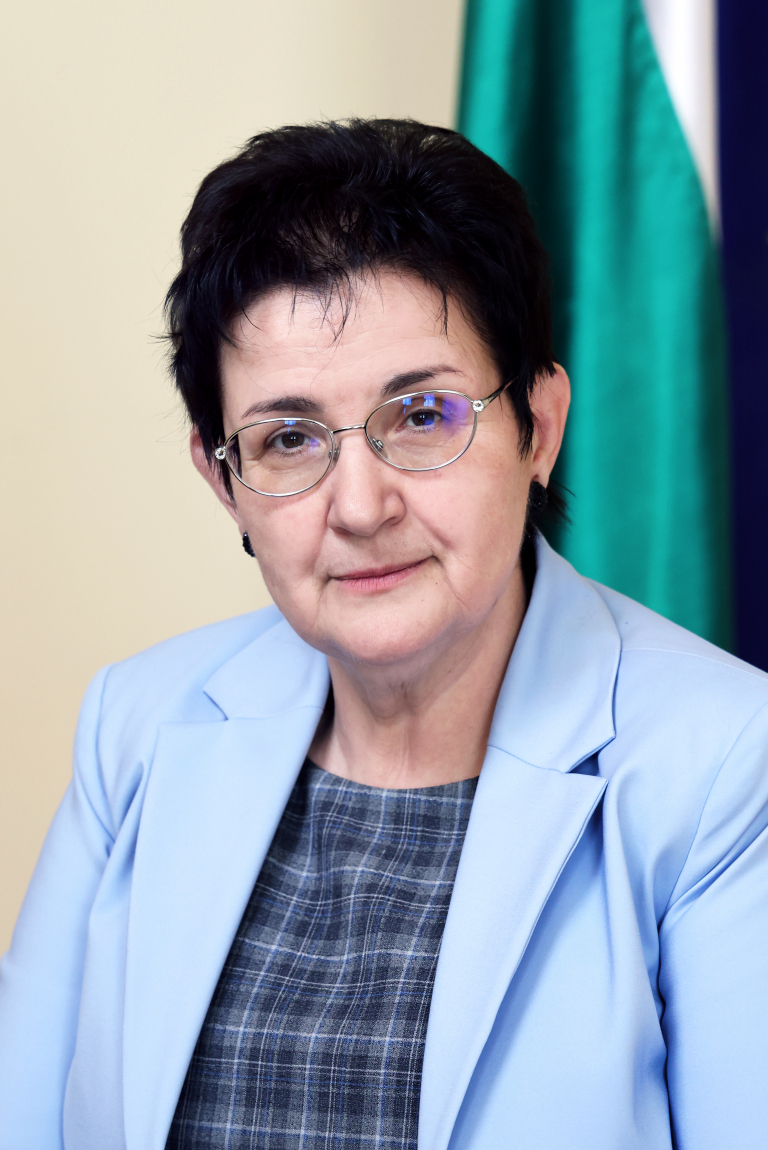
- Official portrait, 2024

Deputy Prime Minister of Bulgaria
- In office 9 April 2024 – 16 January 2025
- Prime Minister: Dimitar Glavchev
- Preceded by: Mariya Gabriel
- Succeeded by: Tomislav Donchev; Atanas Zafirov; Grozdan Karadzhov

Minister of Finance
- In office 9 April 2024 – 16 January 2025
- Prime Minister: Dimitar Glavchev
- Preceded by: Assen Vassilev
- Succeeded by: Temenuzhka Petkova

Personal details
- Born: Lyudmila Kostova Petkova; 28 September 1967 (age 58) Sofia, PR Bulgaria
- Party: Independent
- Education: Master's degree in Economics and Trade Management
- Alma mater: University of National and World Economy
- Occupation: Politician; economist

Lyudmila Kostova Petkova (Bulgarian: Людмила Костова Петкова, born 28 September 1967) is a Bulgarian economist and politician who served as Deputy Prime Minister and Minister of Finance from April 2024 to January 2025. A political independent, she is a professional economist, having worked in the public sector for more than 30 years.
