= Temenuzhka Petkova =

Bulgarian politician

- Теменужка Петкова
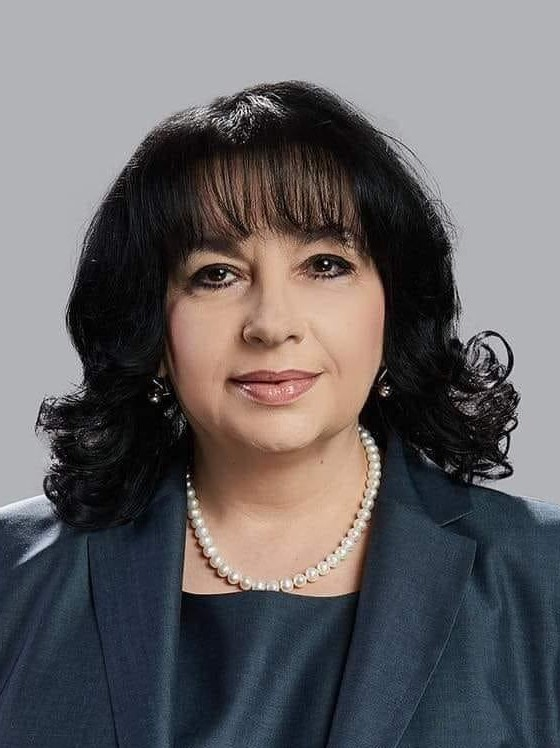
- Petkova in 2025

Minister of Finance
- In office 16 January 2025 – 19 February 2026
- Prime Minister: Rosen Zhelyazkov
- Preceded by: Lyudmila Petkova
- Succeeded by: Georgi Klissurski

Member of the National Assembly
- In office 21 July 2021 – 16 January 2025
- Constituency: 28th MMC - Targovishte

Minister of Energy
- In office 4 May 2017 – 12 May 2021
- Prime Minister: Boyko Borisov
- Preceded by: Nikolai Pavlov
- Succeeded by: Andrey Zhivkov
- In office 7 November 2014 – 27 January 2017
- Prime Minister: Boyko Borisov
- Preceded by: Vasil Shtonov
- Succeeded by: Nikolai Pavlov

Personal details
- Born: Temenuzhka Petkova Petkova; 18 January 1967 (age 59) Sofia, PR Bulgaria
- Party: GERB
- Education: University of National and World Economy
- Occupation: Politician; accountant

Temenuzhka Petkova (Bulgarian: Теменужка Петкова) is a Bulgarian politician who is currently the Minister of Finance of Bulgaria. A member of the GERB party, she previously served as the Minister of Energy from 2014 to 2017 and then from 2017 to 2021.

== Early life ==
Petkova was born on 18 January 1967 in the then People's Republic of Bulgaria. She first graduated from the University of National and World Economy with a master's degree in accounting and control. Afterward, she went through training in the field of international audits in the public sector through the Ministries of Finance of Ireland and Great Britain and state financial inspection through the Ministry of Finance of Portugal.

== Career ==
After completing her education, from 1992 to 2000 she held the positions of financial auditor and a financial expert in the Department of State Financial Control in Sofia. She then set up a company called ТЕМЕНУГА 2001 in May 2000 that was focused on accounting and consultancy to individuals and businesses. While doing this she also continued to work in the State Financial Control agency as a state international auditor. eventually in 2007, moving to the Public Financial Inspection Inspector. There, in 2007, she became director of the organization and performance of inspection activities for the directorate.

== Ministerial roles ==
During her mandate as Minister of Energy, she participated in the agreement of an extension of the TurkStream natural gas pipeline through Bulgaria. After signing it, the pipeline agreements fell apart after GERB and Boyko Borisov fell out of power, and the government under Kiril Petkov attempted to steer away from Russia.
