= Emil Dechev =

Bulgarian jurist and politician (born 1970)

- Емил Дечев
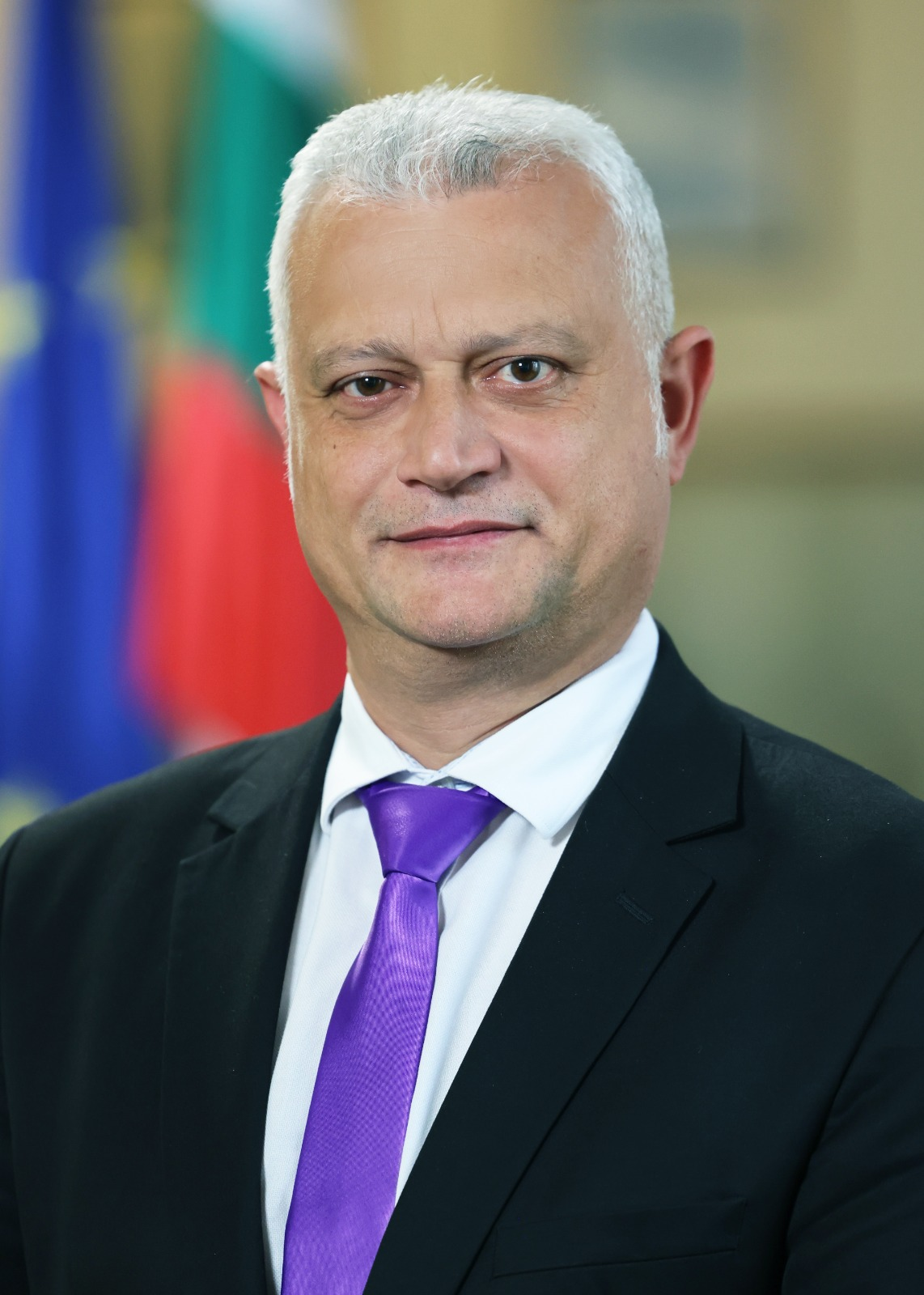
- Official portrait, 2026

Minister of Interior
- In office 19 February 2026 – 8 May 2026
- Prime Minister: Andrey Gyurov
- Preceded by: Daniel Mitov
- Succeeded by: Ivan Demerdzhiev

Personal details
- Born: Emil Ivanov Dechev; 5 May 1970 (age 56) Pleven, PR Bulgaria
- Party: Independent
- Education: Sofia University
- Occupation: Jurist; politician

Emil Ivanov Dechev (Bulgarian: Емил Иванов Дечев, born 5 May 1970) is a Bulgarian jurist and politician who served as Minister of Interior from February to May in 2026. A political independent, he previously served as deputy Minister of Justice from 2022 to 2023.

Dechev has had a longstanding career in criminal law, having served as a judge in the Pleven Regional Court, as well as both the Sofia Regional and City Court. In 2017, he also stood as a candidate for the Supreme Judicial Council of Bulgaria but was unsuccessful.
