= Nepokorna Bulgaria =

Centre-left Bulgarian political party

Defiant Bulgaria Непокорна България
- Abbreviation: NB / NDNB
- Chairperson: Korneliya Ninova
- Founded: 21 December 2024 (as a movement); 27 April 2025 (as a party)
- Split from: Bulgarian Socialist Party
- Political position: Centre-left
- National Assembly: 0 / 240

Website
- ndnb.bg

Nepokorna Bulgaria (NB) (Bulgarian: Непокорна България, romanized: Nepokorna Bŭlgariya (NB) lit. 'Defiant Bulgaria'), or the National Movement of Nepokorna Bulgaria, is a centre-left political party in Bulgaria led by Korneliya Ninova, a former Bulgarian Socialist Party (BSP) leader. Established in December 2024, it became a party in April 2025, when Ninova was elected as its leader, and was officially registered as a party on 18 June 2025.

== History ==
=== Background ===
Following poor performances for the Bulgarian Socialist Party (BSP) in the June 2024 Bulgarian parliamentary election and in the 2024 European Parliament election in Bulgaria held on the same day, Ninova announced on 11 June that she would resign her position as the leader of the party. In the run-up to the October 2024 Bulgarian parliamentary election, there was a dispute between Ninova as outgoing leader and the interim leaders, potentially stopping BSP from being able to partake in the elections. In September, the BSP national council voted to expel Ninova from the party alongside some of her allies. Bulgarian media noted the movement's name's similarity to Jean-Luc Mélenchon's La France Insoumise.

=== Foundation ===
Following her expulsion from the BSP, Ninova announced that she would be forming a new political party. On 21 December, Ninova announced on TV she would be founding a new centre-left movement with aspirations to turn it into a political party, possibly by spring 2025. She said the movement would be pro-European and advocate for family values. In February 2025, the movement announced it had launched a petition to get the 2,500 signatures required to form a political party. On 27 April 2025, the party was launched at a foundation meeting attended by over 570 delegates, who elected Ninova as chairperson of the party. They also elected a 15-member governing body, including former BSP MPs.

== Election results ==
=== National Assembly ===
Election	Leader	Votes	%	Seats	+/–	Status
2026	Korneliya Ninova	6,221	0.19 (#18)	0 / 240	New	Extra-parliamentary
