= Boyko Rashkov =

Bulgarian politician

- Бойко Рашков
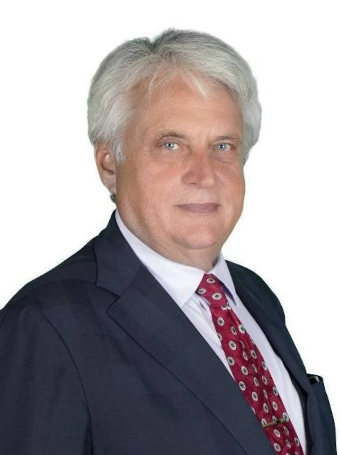

Member of the National Assembly
- Incumbent
- Assumed office 19 October 2022
- Constituency: 14th MMC - Pernik
- In office 5 July 2001 – 17 June 2005
- Constituency: 13th MMC - Pazardzhik

Minister of the Interior
- In office 12 May 2021 – 2 August 2022
- Prime Minister: Stefan Yanev; Kiril Petkov
- Preceded by: Mladen Marinov
- Succeeded by: Ivan Demerdzhiev

Deputy Prime Minister of Bulgaria
- In office 12 May 2021 – 13 December 2021 Serving with Galab Donev and Atanas Pekanov
- Prime Minister: Stefan Yanev
- Preceded by: Tomislav Donchev; Ekaterina Zakharieva; Krasimir Karakachanov
- Succeeded by: Assen Vassilev; Korneliya Ninova; Grozdan Karadjov; Borislav Sandov

Personal details
- Born: 28 September 1954 (age 72) Ognyanovo, PR Bulgaria
- Party: We Continue the Change
- Other political affiliations: BSP (2001-2009)
- Education: Sofia University
- Occupation: attorney • politician

Boyko Iliev Rashkov (Bulgarian: Бойко Илиев Рашков, born 28 September 1954 in Ognyanovo, Garmen Municipality) is a Bulgarian lawyer, state official and politician, deputy to the National Assembly in 2021, Deputy Prime Minister for Public Order and Security. He was Minister of the Interior in the first and second Stefan Yanev government and in the Kiril Petkov government.

== Curriculum vitae ==
In 1979, he graduated in law from the Sofia University. Later, he became a lecturer and associate professor at the University of National and World Economy, in 2016 he took over the department of criminal law. From 1981 to 1992 he was an investigator in the regional investigative service in Sofia, from 1995 to 2001 he headed the State Investigation Service (NSS) at the national level as deputy prosecutor general. In the years 2001–2005, he was a member of the National Assembly of the 39th term from the list of the Coalition for Bulgaria. From January 2008 to May 2009, he was deputy minister of justice, and returned to work at the NSS as department director. From 2013 to 2018, he was the director of the state office responsible for controlling the use of special measures in investigations (NBKSRS).

In May 2021, he was appointed to the offices of the deputy prime minister for public order and security and the minister of internal affairs in the transitional administration of Stefan Yanev. He remained in these positions in the second technical government of the same prime minister, created in September 2021. In December 2021, he left the position of deputy prime minister. In the government that was established at that time, Kiril Petkov maintained the position of Minister of the Interior (on the recommendation of the group We Continue the Change).
