= Valery Beltchev =

Bulgarian economist

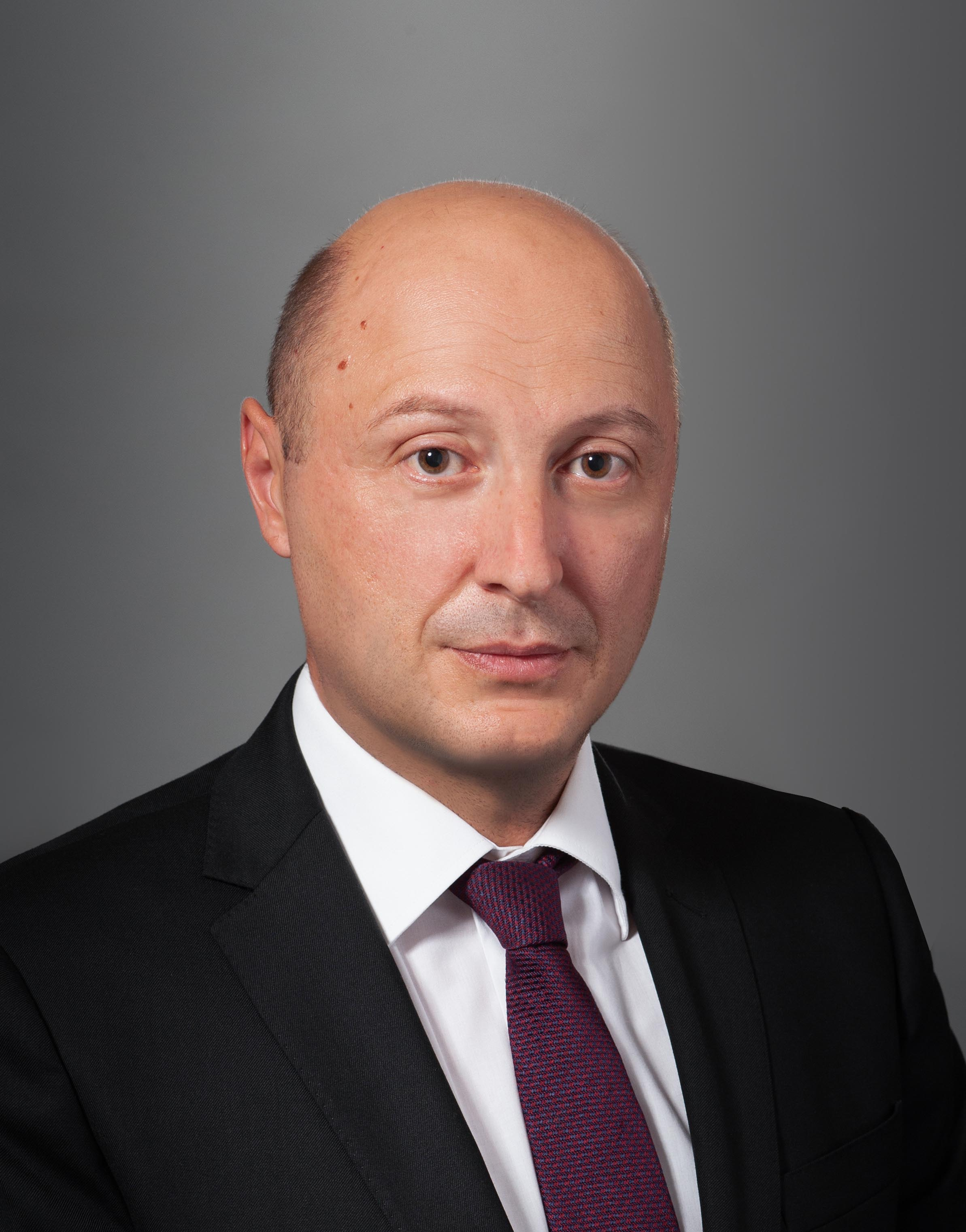

Minister of Finance
- In office 15 September 2021 – 13 December 2021
- President: Rumen Radev
- Preceded by: Assen Vassilev
- Succeeded by: Assen Vassilev

Personal details
- Born: 6 September 1974 (age 51)
- Education: Paris-Panthéon-Assas University (BA); University of National and World Economy (PhD); Harvard Kennedy School (MPA)

Valery Beltchev (born September 6, 1974) is a Bulgarian politician and government minister. He was the Minister of Finance from September 2021 to December 2021.

Political offices
Preceded by Assen Vassilev	Minister of Finance; 2021-2021	Succeeded by Assen Vassilev
