= Yanaki Stoilov =

Bulgarian politician

- Янаки Стоилов
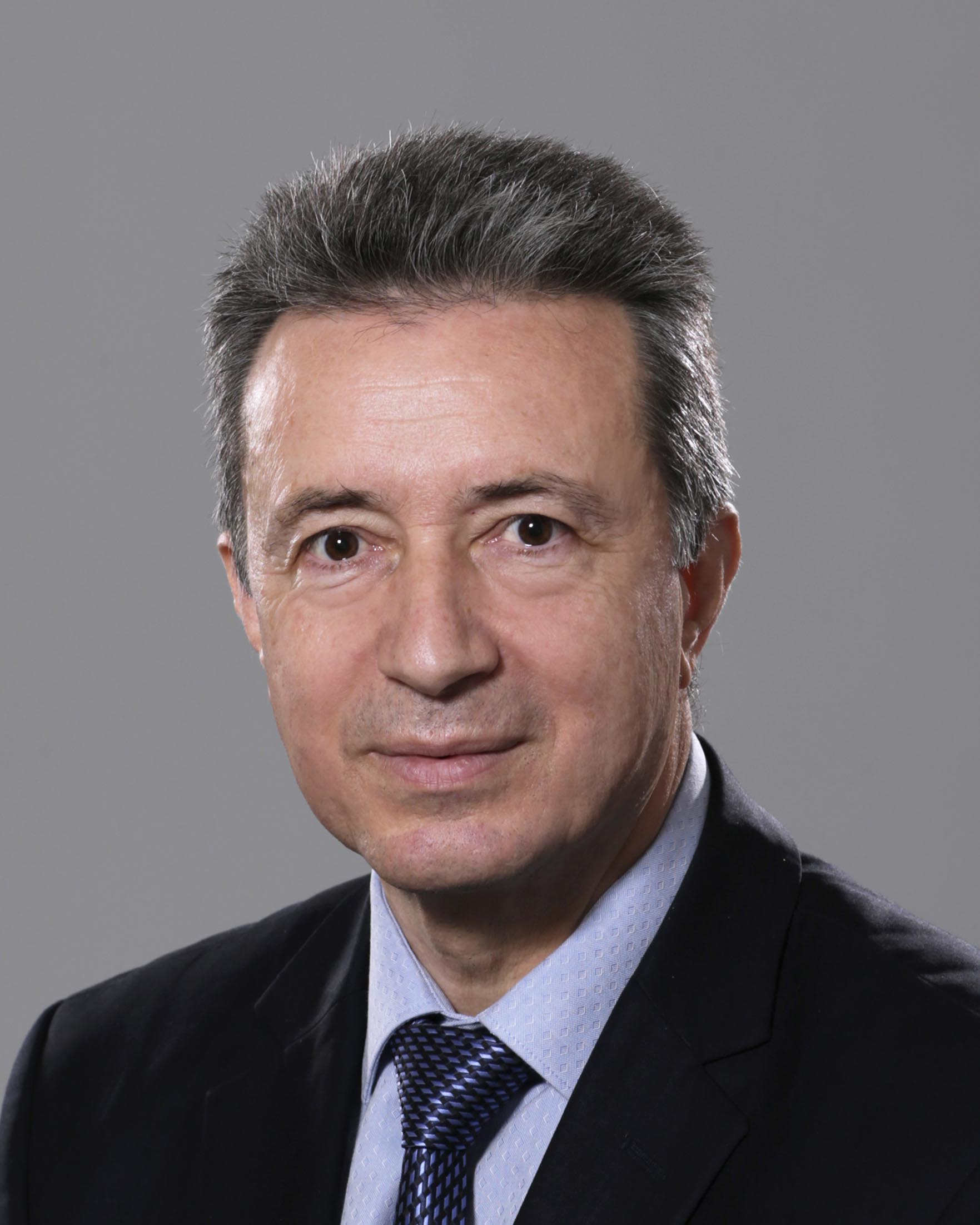
- Official portrait, 2021

Judge of the Constitutional Court
- Incumbent
- Assumed office 15 November 2021
- Appointed by: Rumen Radev
- Preceded by: Boris Velchev

Minister of Justice
- In office 12 May 2021 – 29 October 2021
- Prime Minister: Stefan Yanev
- Preceded by: Desislava Ahladova
- Succeeded by: Ivan Demerdzhiev

Member of the National Assembly
- In office 7 May 1997 – 27 January 2017
- Constituency: 11th MMC - Lovech (1997-2009); 12th MMC - Montana (2009-2013); 6th MMC - Vratsa (2013-2014); 13th MMC - Pazardzhik (2014-2017)
- In office 4 November 1991 – 17 October 1994
- Constituency: 11th MMC - Lovech

Member of the 7th Grand National Assembly
- In office 10 July 1990 – 2 October 1991

Personal details
- Born: 8 September 1958 (age 68) Veliko Tarnovo, PR Bulgaria
- Party: Bulgarian Socialist Party
- Education: Sofia University
- Occupation: politician; lecturer

Yanaki Boyanov Stoilov (Bulgarian: Янаки Боянов Стоилов) is a Bulgarian politician and university lecturer who is currently serving as one of the 12 Judges of the Constitutional Court of Bulgaria. He was previously a Member of the National Assembly and the Minister of Justice.

== Biography ==
Yanaki Stoilov was born on September 8, 1958, in Veliko Tarnovo. He graduated in law at Sofia University, where he was elected Associate Professor (2002) and Professor of Theory of Law and Political Science (September 2018). He lectures on General Theory of the State at Plovdiv University, where he was elected professor in January 2019. He is also a Doctor of Law with a dissertation on "Subjective Law (Nature, Action, Types)" (1990). His main theoretical work is "State Power".

Yanaki Stoilov was among the authors of the 1991 post-communist Constitution of Bulgaria.

As a member of the Bulgarian Socialist Party, he was a member of the VII Grand National Assembly, XXXVI National Assembly, XXXVIII National Assembly, XXXIX National Assembly, XL National Assembly, XLI [National Assembly for the total span of 27 years of public service in the legislative branch. He later on was appointed caretaker Minister of Justice by President Rumen Radev after the political parties in the National Assembly failed to form a government and served between May and October 2021. His governance was cut short after he was appointed again by President Rumen Radev to serve as a judge of the Constitutional Court of Bulgaria. He assumed office on November 15, 2021, with his term set to expire in 2030.
