= We Continue the Change =

Political party and electoral alliance in Bulgaria

We Continue the Change Продължаваме промяната
- Abbreviation: PP
- Leader: Assen Vassilev
- Founders: Kiril Petkov; Assen Vassilev
- Founded: 17 September 2021
- Registered: 15 April 2022
- Youth wing: Youth for the Change
- Women's wing: Her, the Change
- Membership (29 June 2025): 6,000+
- Ideology: Liberalism
- Political position: Centre
- National affiliation: PP–DB (2023–2026)
- European affiliation: Alliance of Liberals and Democrats for Europe Party
- European Parliament group: Renew Europe
- Colours: Blue; Yellow; Green
- National Assembly: 16 / 240
- European Parliament: 2 / 17
- Municipalities: 6 / 265
- Sofia City Council: 5 / 61

Website
- promeni.bg
- Politics of Bulgaria; Political parties; Elections; A: It has been also positioned as a centre-left or a centre-right party.

We Continue the Change (Bulgarian: Продължаваме промяната, romanized: Prodalzhavame promyanata; PP), sometimes translated as Change Continues or Let's Pursue Change, is a centrist, anti-corruption political party and formerly an electoral alliance in Bulgaria founded by Kiril Petkov and Assen Vassilev. It was founded ahead of the November 2021 election. The party was officially registered on 15 April. The party was a ruling party in Bulgaria during the periods of Kiril Petkov's government (December 2021–December 2022) and as part of the PP-DB alliance in the Nikolai Denkov government (June 2023–April 2024).

== History ==
=== Background and formation ===
2021–2023 party logo

The controversial third Borisov government, a coalition between the conservative GERB and the nationalist United Patriots alliance, with the support of the populist Volya Movement, sparked mass protests over corruption allegations, which led to the rise of several new parties and populist movements. At the end of the term of the National Assembly, a parliamentary election was held in April 2021, which saw the minor coalition partners fail to reach the 4% threshold. Instead, several anti-Borisov parties and electoral coalitions entered parliament (ITN, DB and IBG-NI), with a combined 92 seats. None of them were willing to form a government with any of the other “status quo” parties (BSP, GERB and DPS) and the BSP was unwilling to work with GERB. Thus, no government could be formed and a snap election was scheduled to take place in July. Bulgarian President Rumen Radev appointed an interim government.

Several ministers from the interim government became outspoken critics of Borisov and his allies. This included Interior minister Boyko Rashkov, Finance minister Assen Vassilev, Economy minister Kiril Petkov and Education minister Nikolai Denkov. The July 2021 election saw the three “protest parties” make gains to a total of 112 seats, and ITN surpassed GERB to become the winning party. However no government could be formed, and another snap election was scheduled to take place in November, alongside the presidential election. Three of the anti-Borisov interim ministers (Assen Vassilev, Kiril Petkov and Nikolai Denkov) had been offered to join ITN's government, however, they refused the offer.

Petkov and Vassilev stated that they would start their own political project that would be an alternative anti-corruption party which could be seen as a “uniting force” between the other parties. A new interim government was appointed by president Radev which did not include ministers Petkov and Vassilev. Their party was officially launched on 17 September 2021, following a month-long speculation about its creation. The two former ministers were coined the “Harvard boys” by the media, as both had been educated there.

=== November 2021 election ===
Since the party was created too late to have its own registration, it had to compete in the elections within an electoral coalition alongside one or more registered member parties. This was done through Volt Bulgaria and Middle European Class, with the former being a party that recently left the parliamentary coalition IBG-NI.

For the 2021 presidential election, Petkov and Vassilev declared their support for the incumbent President Rumen Radev. The party favoured working with the anti-establishment parties, not in a pre-electoral coalition, but instead in the form of an agreement of cooperation following the November election. There was speculation it may join a coalition with BSP for Bulgaria. It did not rule out working with GERB–SDS or DPS, but Petkov set out harsh conditions if they were to cooperate.

In the November election, the party came out on top with over 25% of the vote and 67 of the 240 seats. It was given the mandate to form a government on 13 December 2021, and formed a broad coalition between the anti-establishment parties There Is Such a People and Democratic Bulgaria, alongside the leftist BSP for Bulgaria. The government, led by Petkov, set out to remove corruption within the country and counter the problems faced by Bulgaria, including the energy crisis and COVID-19 pandemic.

=== Petkov government ===
The new government included five ministers from the interim governments that preceded it - Petkov, Vassilev, Rashkov, Denkov and former prime minister Stefan Yanev. Yanev was dismissed following his refusal to label the Russian invasion of Ukraine as a war. The government became a minority government on 8 June 2022, when ITN pulled out of it. Several weeks later, it became was the first government in Bulgarian history to lose a vote of confidence. As the largest party, they were given the first mandate to form another government. Their nominee was Assen Vassilev, who returned the mandate unfulfilled. No party was able to form another government and a new election was scheduled to take place.

During the period of the government, the party was officially registered, despite legal challenges regarding the party name.

=== 2022 parliamentary election ===
The new election saw PP fall to second place with 19.5% and 53 seats, behind GERB. As the second-largest party, they were given a mandate for government formation following the rejection of GERB's candidate by the National Assembly. Their candidate for Prime Minister was Nikolai Denkov, who did not receive a majority in Parliament. PP refused to join in talks with BSP, and new elections will be scheduled for Spring 2023.

=== 2023 parliamentary election onwards ===
We Continue the Change (PP) decided to contest the 2023 election together with the alliance Democratic Bulgaria. In the elections, PP won 36 seats as part of the coalition.

In June 2025, Petkov resigned as leader of PP, following one of the party's district mayors being accused of misuse of public procurement and the party's zero tolerance approach to corruption He also called on Boyko Borisov, the GERB leader, to resign.

== Ideology and platform ==
PP is a centrist party, although it has been also described as centre-left, or as centre-right. Ideologically, it has been described as a liberal, social-liberal, pro-European, and anti-corruption party. Economically, its main goals are to create a favourable economic and administrative environment for the free development of small and medium-sized businesses and to attract strategic high-tech investments and was called a Third Way for Bulgarian standards. On a more political level, they seek to stop corruption and misuse of state funds as well as uphold the rule of law. Priority for government formation is the access to quality education and healthcare for all Bulgarian citizens, modern infrastructure. They also stress social policy, in particular improving pensions for retired people.

For the 2021 parliamentary elections, the coalition campaigned on a vague platform to attract voters of different persuasions, with particular emphasis on the corruption of the former government of Boyko Borissov. Kiril Petkov and Assen Vassilev, both businessmen, were seen as pro-business and advocated anchoring Bulgaria in the European Union and NATO. The party is sometimes identified as having a centre-left and a centre-right wing, respectively led by Vassilev and Petkov. Following Petkov's resignation and the 2025 party congress that reelected Vassilev as the sole party leader, Nikola Minchev stated that he expected the party to shift towards the centre-left.

== National affiliation ==
=== 2021–2022 (We Continue the Change) ===
In 2021 and 2022, PP ran in a coalition of the same name, alongside two smaller "mandate carrier" parties, Volt Bulgaria, and Middle European Class (SEC), which surrendered their party lists up to the coalition to be used at the election. Additionally, for the November 2021 election, the Political Movement "Social Democrats" was a part of the electoral coalition and the Union of Free Democrats unofficially supported it.

Party	Leader	Ideology	Nov. 2021 result	2022 result
We Continue the Change (PP)	Kiril Petkov; Assen Vassilev	Centrism; Pro-Europeanism; Anti-corruption	61 / 240	47 / 240
Middle European Class (SEC)	Georgi Manev	Economic liberalism Burgas regionalism Pro-Europeanism	4 / 240	4 / 240
Volt Bulgaria (Volt)	Nastimir Ananiev	European federalism Social liberalism Progressivism	2 / 240	2 / 240
Political Movement "Social Democrats" (PDS)	Elena Noneva	Social democracy Pro-Europeanism	0 / 240	Not in alliance
Union of Free Democrats (SSD)	Milan Milanov	Conservatism	Support outside official registration	Not in alliance

=== 2023–present (PP–DB) ===
Ahead of the 2023 election PP merged with another anti-corruption coalition, DB. The two had worked closely together in the previous parliament. They were supported by other anti-corruption parties, some of which had been a part of IBG-NI.

Party	Leader	Ideology	Position	2023 MPs	Jun 2024 MPs	2024 MEPs	Oct 2024 MPs
We Continue the Change (PP)	Kiril Petkov; Assen Vassilev	Liberalism; Anti-corruption	Centre	36 / 240 (Note: During the term of the 49th National Assembly Radostin Vasilev left the PP-DB parliamentary group and founded MECh.)	22 / 240	2 / 17	19 / 240
Yes, Bulgaria! (DaB!)	Bozhidar Bozhanov; Ivaylo Mirchev	Liberalism; Anti-corruption	Centre to centre-right	13 / 240	9 / 240	0 / 17	12 / 240
Democrats for a Strong Bulgaria (DSB)	Atanas Atanasov	Liberal conservatism Economic liberalism	Centre-right	10 / 240	8 / 240	1 / 17	6 / 240
Volt Bulgaria (Volt) (Note: This party has left the alliance.)	Nastimir Ananiev	European federalism Social liberalism	Centre to centre-left	1 / 240	0 / 240	0 / 17	Not in alliance
Green Movement (ZD)	Toma Belev	Green politics Environmentalism; Liberalism	Centre to centre-left	3 / 240	Not in alliance (Note: Former ZD members who had left the party ran on PP-DB's lists and were elected to Parliament.)	Not in alliance	Not in alliance (Note: Former ZD members who had left the party ran on PP-DB's lists.)
Middle European Class (SEK)	Konstantin Bachiyski	Economic liberalism Burgas regionalism	Centre-right	1 / 240	Not in alliance	Not in alliance	Not in alliance
United Agrarians (OZ)	Petya Straleva	Agrarianism	Centre-right	0 / 240	Not in alliance	Not in alliance	Not in alliance

== European affiliation ==
In the European Committee of the Regions, We Continue the Change sits in the Renew Europe COR Group, with one full and one alternate members for the 2025-2030 mandate. Tsvetelina Simeonova-Zarkin is a member of the Renew Europe COR Bureau.

== Election results ==
The coalition took part in the November 2021 Bulgarian election, coming in first place with 25.67% of the vote and 67 seats. At the election, the coalition won 67 seats. 4 went to SEC and 2 seats were won by Volt. The main 'We Continue the Change' party won the rest of the seats. In 2022, the electoral coalition dropped down to second place behind GERB–SDS, with 53 seats overall.

=== National Assembly ===
National Assembly
Election	Leader	Votes	%	Alliance Seats	Party Seats	+/–	Government
Nov 2021 (Note: Run as part of the We Continue the Change coalition.)	Kiril Petkov; Assen Vassilev	673,170	25.32 (#1)	67 / 240	61 / 67	New	Coalition
2022	Kiril Petkov; Assen Vassilev	506,099	19.52 (#2)	53 / 240	47 / 53	▼14	Snap election
2023 (Note: Run as part of the PP–DB coalition.)	Kiril Petkov; Assen Vassilev	619,592	23.53 (#2)	64 / 240	36 / 64	▼11	Coalition
Jun 2024	Kiril Petkov; Assen Vassilev	307,849	13.92 (#3)	39 / 240	22 / 39	▼14	Snap election
Oct 2024	Kiril Petkov; Assen Vassilev	346,063	13.74 (#2)	36 / 240	19 / 36	▼3	Opposition
2026	Assen Vassilev	408,864	12.42 (#3)	37 / 240	16 / 37	▼3	Opposition

=== European Parliament ===
European Parliament
Election	List leader	Votes	%	Alliance Seats	Party Seats	+/–	EP Group
2024	Nikola Minchev	290,865	14.45 (#3)	3 / 17	2 / 3	New	RE

=== President ===
Presidential elections
Election	Candidate	First round			Second round		
Election	Candidate	Votes	%	Rank	Votes	%	Result
2021 (Note: Endorsed the independent candidacy of incumbent president Rumen Radev.)	Rumen Radev	1,322,385	49.42	1st	1,539,650	66.72	Won
2026	Andrey Gyurov	486,232	31.95	2nd	750,251	39.48	Lost
