= Atanas Pekanov =

Bulgarian politician

- Атанас Пеканов
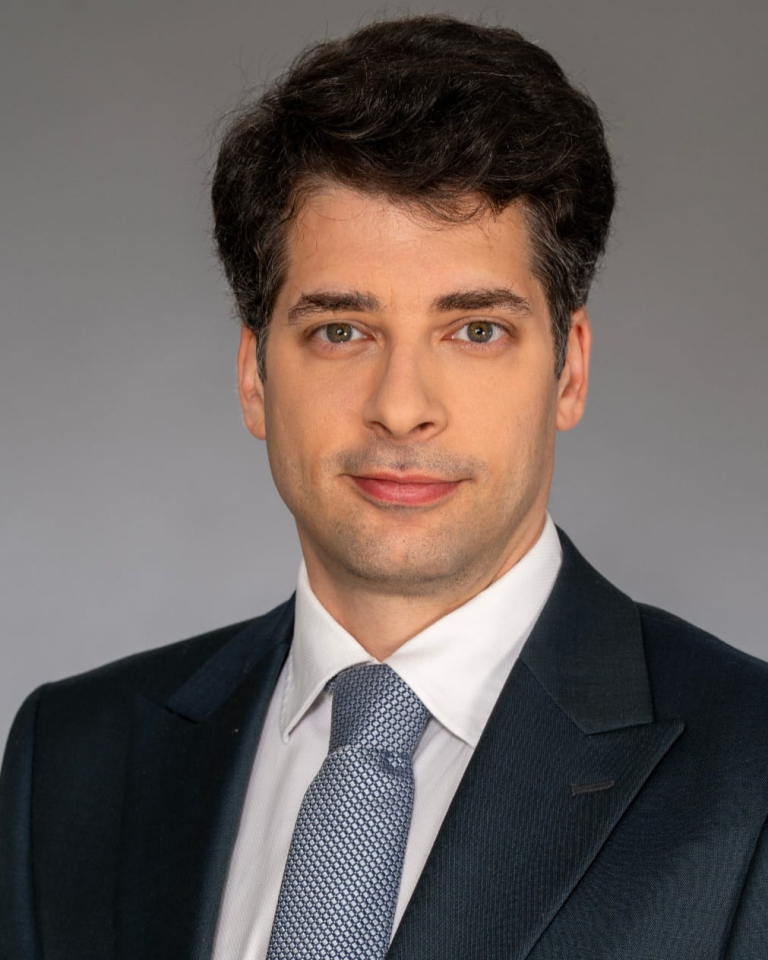
- Official portrait, 2026

Deputy Prime Minister of Bulgaria (Note: Alongside Galab Donev, Aleksandur Pulev and Ivo Hristov since 2026. Alongside Ivan Demerdzhiev, Lazar Lazarov and Hristo Alexiev from 2022 to 2023. Alongside Boyko Rashkov and Galab Donev in 2021.)
- Incumbent
- Assumed office 8 May 2026
- Prime Minister: Rumen Radev
- Preceded by: Andrey Yankulov (Note: Yankulov, alongside Maria Nedina.)
- In office 2 August 2022 – 6 June 2023
- Prime Minister: Galab Donev
- Preceded by: Assen Vassilev (Note: Vassilev, alongside Korneliya Ninova, Grozdan Karadjov, Kalina Konstantinova and Borislav Sandov.)
- Succeeded by: Mariya Gabriel
- In office 12 May 2021 – 13 December 2021
- Prime Minister: Stefan Yanev
- Preceded by: Tomislav Donchev (Note: Donchev, alongside Ekaterina Zakharieva, Krasimir Karakachanov and Mariyana Nikolova.)
- Succeeded by: Assen Vassilev (Note: Vassilev, alongside Korneliya Ninova, Grozdan Karadjov, Kalina Konstantinova and Borislav Sandov)

Personal details
- Born: Atanas Angelov Pekanov; 30 April 1991 (age 35) Athens, Greece
- Party: Independent
- Domestic partner: Anna-Maria Konova
- Children: 1
- Education: Vienna University of Economics (BSc); University College London (MSc)
- Occupation: Politician; economist

Atanas Angelov Pekanov (Bulgarian: Атанас Ангелов Пеканов, born April 30, 1991) is a Bulgarian economist and politician serving as Deputy Prime Minister since 2026, a position he previously held from 2022 to 2023 and briefly in 2021. A political independent, his portfolio is the management of funds by the European Union.

== Biography ==
He was born in 1991 in Athens, Greece. He graduated from a German language high school in Sofia, and then studied economics at the Vienna University of Economics and Business and achieved master's degree in economic policy at University College London.

Pekanov joined the European Central Bank in Frankfurt, Germany, in 2016.

Since 2017, he has been working at the Austrian Institute for Economic Research (WIFO) as an economist, focusing on macroeconomic, monetary, and fiscal policy, publishing research on topics related to with the Austrian and European economy. In this role, he actively participated in discussions regarding the European Monetary Union and the steps to complete its architecture. Since 2017, he has also been a doctoral candidate at the Vienna University of Economics, with the main topics of his scientific work being the monetary and fiscal policy in the Eurozone, the European Monetary Union, as well as the use of innovative macro models (HANK) using micro data for the economic behavior of households.

In 2015, he won the annual scholarship competition (master's degree) of the Bulgarian National Bank with an essay on the topic "Effects of economic sanctions" and developed a scientific paper on the topic "Use of the countercyclical capital buffer in the EU member states", later published as a commentary study by the ESRB. In 2019, he won the annual competition for scholarship holders (doctorate degree) of the BNB with an essay on equilibrium interest rates and, as part of the scholarship, developed a scientific study on the topic "Synchronization of the business cycle in the European Monetary Union".

In 2018, he won the annual Dissertation Fellowship for Young Scientists of the Austrian Economic Association, for ideas related to the use of data on the distributional effects of macroeconomic policy.

In the academic year 2019/2020, he is a scholar of the Fulbright research program and attends the Faculty of Economics of Harvard University. His research is focused on the new generation of macroeconomic models (Heterogeneous Agents, New Keynesian Macro), which examine the effects of fiscal and monetary policy on income distribution. Presents research in this field at conferences such as the 11th Conference on Macroeconomics and Survey Data, organized by the Ifo Institute in Munich; Workshop Empirical Monetary Economics, organized by OFCE and Sians Poe in Paris; Banque de France/SUERF Symposium 2019, and others.

Since the summer of 2020, he has participated together with the German Institute for Economic Research in a project in which he prepares research on the effects of current monetary policy within the framework of the Monetary Policy Dialogue of the European Parliament, the quarterly hearing of the President of the European Central Bank in the European Parliament. Two of his studies in this series have been published so far: "Side Effects of Negative Interest Rates" and "Effects of Pandemic-Induced Monetary Policy Uncertainty on Monetary Policy."

== Career and Research ==
Pekanov's academic career has been marked by notable accomplishments and research contributions. He has held various positions at prestigious institutions, including the Austrian Institute of Economic Research (WIFO) and the Vienna University of Economics and Business. His work has been published in several esteemed economic journals, such as the European Journal of Political Economy, the Journal of Economic Behavior & Organization, and the Journal of Public Economics.

One of Pekanov's most significant research contributions is the study on the impact of fiscal policies on income inequality and economic growth. In this research, he analyzed the role of government spending and taxation policies in fostering economic development and reducing income disparities. Through his work, Pekanov has provided valuable insights into the potential benefits of progressive taxation, social welfare programs, and other fiscal policy tools in promoting social equity and economic prosperity.

In addition to his academic career, Pekanov has also been an active participant in public policy discussions, often sharing his expertise on with policymakers and the public. He has participated in various conferences and seminars, sharing his knowledge and insights on topics such as tax policy, income distribution, and economic growth.

== See also ==
- Bulgarian Government
- Rumen Radev
