= Stefan Yanev =

Prime Minister of Bulgaria in 2021

- Стефан Янев
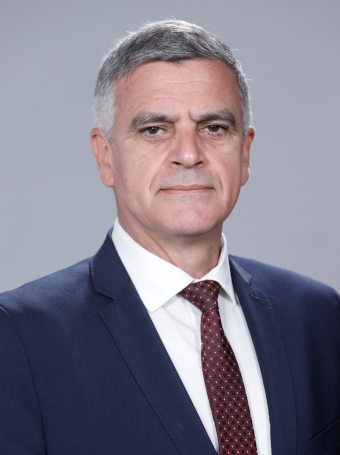
- Official portrait, 2022

Prime Minister of Bulgaria
- In office 12 May 2021 – 13 December 2021
- President: Rumen Radev
- Deputy: Atanas Pekanov; Boyko Rashkov; Galab Donev
- Preceded by: Boyko Borisov
- Succeeded by: Kiril Petkov
Post ministerial offices (2022–present)
Member of the National Assembly
In office 19 October 2022 – 3 February 2023
Constituency	24th MMC - Sofia
Leader of the Bulgarian Rise Party
Incumbent
Assumed office 5 May 2022
Preceded by	Position established
Ministerial offices (2017–2022)
Minister of Defence
In office 13 December 2021 – 1 March 2022
Prime Minister	Kiril Petkov
Preceded by	Georgi Panayotov
Succeeded by	Dragomir Zakov
In office 27 January 2017 – 4 May 2017
Prime Minister	Ognyan Gerdzhikov
Preceded by	Nikolay Nenchev
Succeeded by	Krasimir Karakachanov

Personal details
- Born: Stefan Dinchev Yanev; 1 March 1960 (age 66) Popovitsa, Plovdiv, PR Bulgaria
- Party: Bulgarian Rise (since 2022)
- Other political affiliations: Independent (until 2021); PP (2021–2022)
- Children: 2
- Education: Georgi Rakovski Military Academy
- Occupation: Politician; military general

Military service
- Allegiance: Bulgaria
- Branch/service: Bulgarian People's Army (until 1989); Bulgarian Land Forces (1989–2014)
- Years of service: 1979–2014
- Rank: Brigadier general
- Commands: Artillery division

Stefan Dinchev Yanev (Bulgarian: Стефан Динчев Янев; born 1 March 1960) is a retired Bulgarian brigade general and politician who served as Prime Minister of Bulgaria in 2021, leading a caretaker government. A political independent, he also served as Minister of Defence in 2017 and from 2021 to 2022. Yanev later founded the Bulgarian Rise party and served as Member of the National Assembly from 2022 to 2023.

== Early life ==
He was born on 1 March 1960 in the Popovitsa, Plovdiv Province. In 1979, he graduated from the Technical High School of Electrical Engineering in Plovdiv. Yanev graduated from the Georgy Dimitrov national military artillery school in Shumen (now a faculty of the Vasil Levski National Military University) and began building a career in the army in 1983, when he was appointed commander of an artillery platoon in Asenovgrad. During 1993 - 1996, he received education in Georgi Rakovski Military Academy.

== Military career ==
Yanev was a commander of rocket artillery division in the 4th Army Artillery Regiment in Asenovgrad (1993–1996).

Between 1996 and 1998 he was a senior expert in the International Cooperation Department of the Ministry of Defense. He worked as an analysis officer at the PfP Coordination Group's Planning and Programming Department in Belgium (1998–2000). From 2000 to 2001 he was a senior assistant chief in the Strategic Planning Department of the General Staff of the Bulgarian Army.

Between 2001 and 2002 he was a state expert in the Euro-Atlantic Integration Directorate in the Ministry of Defense. Until 2004 he was head of a department in the Euro-Atlantic Integration Directorate in the Ministry of Defense.

Yanev graduated from the National Defense University in Washington.

From 2005 to 2007, he was Head of the Transformation Department at the NATO Counter-Terrorism Center in Ankara.

From 2007–2010, he was the Director of the Defense Policy Directorate at the Ministry of Defense.

On 1 July 2009, he was appointed Director of the Security and Defense Policy Directorate and awarded the rank of Brigadier General.

On 3 May 2010 he was appointed Director of the Defense Policy Directorate, effective as of 25 May On 24 February 2011 he was relieved of his post, serving later as the military attaché to the United States.

On 2 May 2014, he became the head of the Vasil Levski National Military University. He was relieved on the ninth of the following month, as well as dismissed from military service, as of 9 June 2014.

== Political career ==
From 27 January to 4 May 2017 he was Deputy Prime Minister and Minister of Defense of the Republic of Bulgaria in the caretaker government of Ognyan Gerdzhikov, and subsequently Secretary of Security and Defense of President Rumen Radev.

=== Prime Minister (2021) ===
He was appointed to the post of Prime Minister of Bulgaria by President Rumen Radev on 12 May 2021, succeeding Boyko Borisov. He headed consequently two governments, the first from May to September and the second from September to December. He was succeeded by Kiril Petkov on 13 December 2021.

Stefan Yanev is the first caretaker Prime Minister in Bulgarian history to stay on in that role at the head of two consecutive caretaker governments. He also became the first Prime Minister in modern Bulgarian history to serve as the head of government for two consecutive terms, albeit in a caretaker capacity.

=== Defence Minister (2022) ===
Yanev was dismissed from his post as Minister of Defense by Petkov, because the latter had introduced a political taboo on the use of Russian narratives, including the "special operation" label favoured by Vladimir Putin to refer to the Russian invasion of Ukraine that escalated into full-scale war in 2022. Yanev, who declared following Putin that it is not "war" in Ukraine but a "military operation", was dismissed on 1 March, a week after the start of the invasion.

=== Bulgarian Rise ===
After being ousted as defence minister, Yanev became critical of the government and founded his own party named Bulgarian Rise on 5 May. He also assumed the role as leader of the party.

== Military ranks ==
- Lieutenant (1983)
- Senior Lieutenant (1985)
- Captain (1989)
- Major (1994)
- Lieutenant Colonel (1999)
- Colonel (2004)
- Brigadier General (2009)

Political offices
Preceded by Nikolay Nenchev	Minister of Defence; 2017	Succeeded by Krasimir Karakachanov
Preceded by Boyko Borisov	Prime Minister of Bulgaria; 2021	Succeeded by Kiril Petkov
Preceded by Georgi Panayotov	Minister of Defence; 2021–2022	Succeeded by Dragomir Zakov
Party political offices
New political party	Leader of Bulgarian Rise; 2022–present	Incumbent
