= Borislav Sandov =

Bulgarian politician

- Борислав Сандов
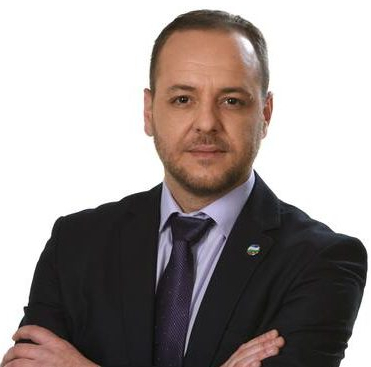

Minister of Environment and Water of Bulgaria
- In office 13 December 2021 – 2 August 2022
- Prime Minister: Kiril Petkov
- Preceded by: Asen Lichev

Personal details
- Born: Borislav Dimitrov Sandov; 16 December 1982 (age 43) Madan, Bulgaria
- Party: Democratic Bulgaria
- Education: Sofia University
- Occupation: Politician; ecologist

Borislav Sandov is a Bulgarian ecologist, politician and member of Bulgaria's 46th National Assembly. He is a member of the political committee of the union Democratic Bulgaria.

He is a co-founder of the Green Movement party and its co-chairperson for three years. Sandov is active in environmental campaigns, including protecting the Irakli beach, banning GMO in foods, moratoriums shale gas and following the laws regarding the Pirin National Park. In late 2015 he is elected as co-chairperson of the Balkan Greens.

== Member of Parliament (2021) ==
On 11 July 2021 he was elected as a deputy in Bulgaria's 46th National Assembly with 12.64% from the Democratic Bulgaria coalition, where he is among the co-chairpeople.

== Minister of Environment and Waters (2021) ==
On 13 December 2021 he was elected as Minister of Environment and Waters, as well as Deputy Prime Minister, in the government of Prime Minister Kiril Petkov.
