= Hristo Alexiev =

Bulgarian politician

Hristo Alexiev is a Bulgarian politician who served as the Minister of Transport and Communications in three caretaker governments between 2021 and 2023. He was also a Deputy Prime Minister from 2022 to 2023.

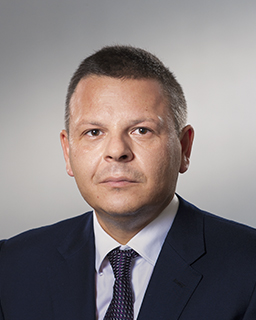
Official portrait, 2022
