= Galab Donev =

Prime Minister of Bulgaria from 2022 to 2023

- Гълъб Донев
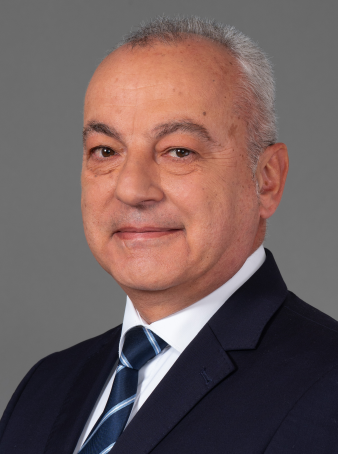
- Official portrait, 2026

Deputy Prime Minister of Bulgaria
- Incumbent
- Assumed office 8 May 2026 Serving with Aleksandur Pulev, Atanas Pekanov and Ivo Hristov
- Prime Minister: Rumen Radev
- In office 12 May 2021 – 13 December 2021 Serving with Atanas Pekanov
- Prime Minister: Stefan Yanev

Minister of Finance
- Incumbent
- Assumed office 8 May 2026
- Prime Minister: Rumen Radev
- Preceded by: Georgi Klisurski

Prime Minister of Bulgaria
- In office 2 August 2022 – 6 June 2023
- President: Rumen Radev
- Deputy: See list: Atanas Pekanov; Ivan Demerdzhiev; Lazar Lazarov; Hristo Alexiev
- Preceded by: Kiril Petkov
- Succeeded by: Nikolai Denkov

Minister of Labor and Social Policy
- In office 12 May 2021 – 13 December 2021
- Prime Minister: Stefan Yanev
- Preceded by: Denitsa Sacheva
- Succeeded by: Georgi Gyokov
- In office 27 January 2017 – 4 May 2017
- Prime Minister: Ognyan Gerdzhikov
- Preceded by: Zornitsa Rusinova
- Succeeded by: Biser Petkov

Personal details
- Born: Galab Spasov Donev; 28 February 1967 (age 59) Sofia, PR Bulgaria
- Party: Progressive Bulgaria
- Other political affiliations: Independent (until 2026)
- Children: 1
- Education: University of National and World Economy
- Occupation: Politician

Galab Spasov Donev (Bulgarian: Гълъб Спасов Донев, born 28 February 1967) is a Bulgarian politician serving as Deputy Prime Minister and Minister of Finance since 2026. Formerly an Independent politician, he previously served as Prime Minister of Bulgaria from 2022 to 2023, heading a caretaker government. Earlier, he held several posts in caretaker governments, including Minister of Labor and Social Policy in 2017 and 2021, as well as Deputy Prime Minister in 2021.

Donev is widely regarded as part of the inner circle to Prime Minister Rumen Radev. As president, the latter appointed the former in three separate caretaker governments. Donev also served as chief of staff to Radev, while he was president. Later, when Radev resigned the presidency and founded the Progressive Bulgaria party, Donev was one of the first people to join the newly-formed political project.

== Caretaker Minister of Labour and Social Policy (2021) ==
In May, 2021, Donev was appointed as Caretaker Minister of Labour and Social Policy in the first Yanev government.

=== Pension reform and Budget Actualization ===
In this role, Galab Donev oversaw the continued increase of state-issued pensions by 50 Leva per month during the Yanev government's tenure. During discussions over the actualization of the state budget, Donev submitted two proposals for the recalculation of pensions: one which would have involved an 'insurance' payment and another which would have raised the 'work experience' coefficient from 1.2 to 3.5, with Donev recommending the latter route.

In a special briefing on 22 July, Donev announced that all pensions will on average increase 12.5% after the 1st of October, and that social supports will be created to support pensioners whose current pension is below the poverty line. Donev further promised that there would not be any pensioners whose income will be below the poverty line, set at 411 Leva. Donev opposed the proposed increase of the minimum pension from 300 Leva to 370 Leva calling it unjust due to differing contributions to the Insurance Fund.

=== Action towards COVID ===
In August 2021, Donev confirmed that all measures previously implemented in other COVID-related lockdown periods will be retained. On 2 September, Donev confirmed that schools would return to physical in-classroom education, citing the need for at-risk youths to be retained within the school system. On 28 October, Donev confirmed that employees could not be terminated if they refused to be vaccinated, although employers were allowed to implement special measures meant to reduce the spread of COVID in the workplace.

== Prime Minister of Bulgaria (2022–2023) ==
=== Activity as Prime Minister (2022–2023) ===
Donev was officially appointed as Caretaker Prime Minister on 1 August, by President Rumen Radev, after all attempts at government formation failed after the successful fall of the Petkov Government in June 2022. During the official ceremony for the appointment, Donev outlined the main priorities of the incoming caretaker government: the organization of fair elections; restoring trust in institutions; finding pathways out of “inherited crises”; reducing political polarization and continued work on implementing laws to do with the European Plan for Recovery and Stability.

During the official handover ceremony with outgoing PM Kiril Petkov, Donev urged the incoming Caretaker Ministers to "dedicate 100% of their energy to finding creative solutions for Bulgarian citizens". On 3 August, one day after the appointment of the cabinet, Donev announced the formation of a Crisis-Management Team, headed by the Vice-Minister for the Economy, Hristo Aleksiev, to tackle issues with the supply of energy to the country. On 4 August, Donev chaired the first regular meeting of the Cabinet, during which he announced that the government was developing a plan to financially stabilise the primary Bulgarian energy supplier, Bulgargaz, and did not need "consultations".

On 11 August, Donev announced that Bulgargaz would receive an 800 million Leva loan to insure the security of gas deliveries throughout the winter months. During the National Consultation of the Ministry of Interior, on August 12, Galab Donev stated that "the state has declared war on the controlled and bought vote", and outlined the two main priorities of the Ministry of Interior as insuring fair elections and reducing road-related crime.

After the traffic disaster on the highway "Trakiya", Donev expressed the view that the Ministry of Interior must "do more" to prevent traffic incidents in the future. On 26 August, after the death of two police officers in clashes with human traffickers near the border with Turkey, Donev expressed his condolences with their families and promised a "swift response" to the recent increased migration pressure on the Bulgarian-Turkish border. His role as caretaker prime minister ended on 6 June 2023, when the National Assembly decided to vote on a proposal to authorize a cabinet headed by Nikolai Denkov.

Political offices
Preceded by Zornitsa Rusinova	Minister of Labor and Social Policy; 2017	Succeeded by Biser Petkov
Preceded by Denitsa Sacheva	Minister of Labor and Social Policy; 2021	Succeeded by Georgi Gyokov
Preceded by Kiril Petkov	Prime Minister of Bulgaria; 2022–2023	Succeeded by Nikolai Denkov
