= Border Police (Bulgaria) =

Directorate-General for Border Police Главна дирекция „Гранична полиция”
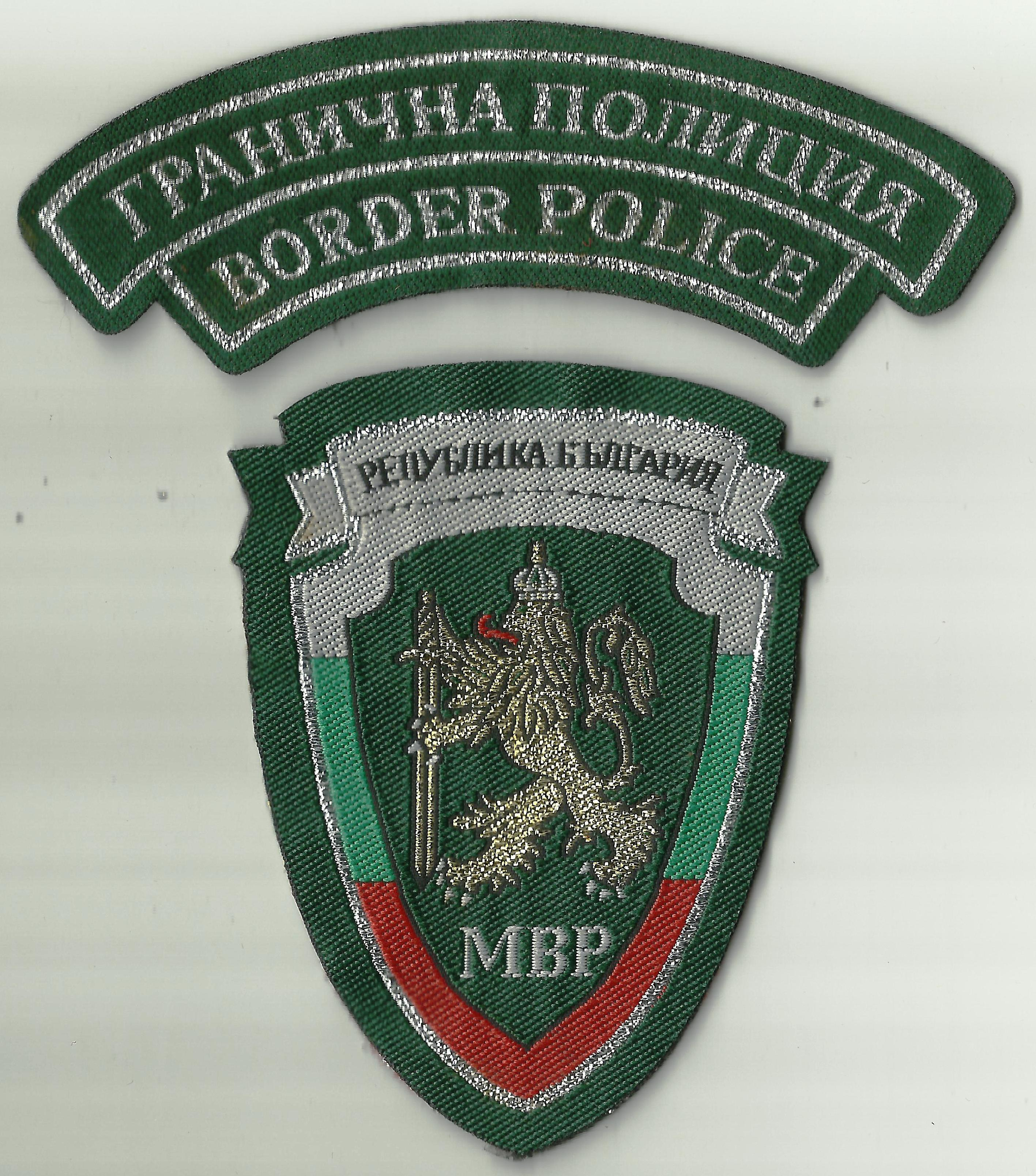
- Border Police Patch

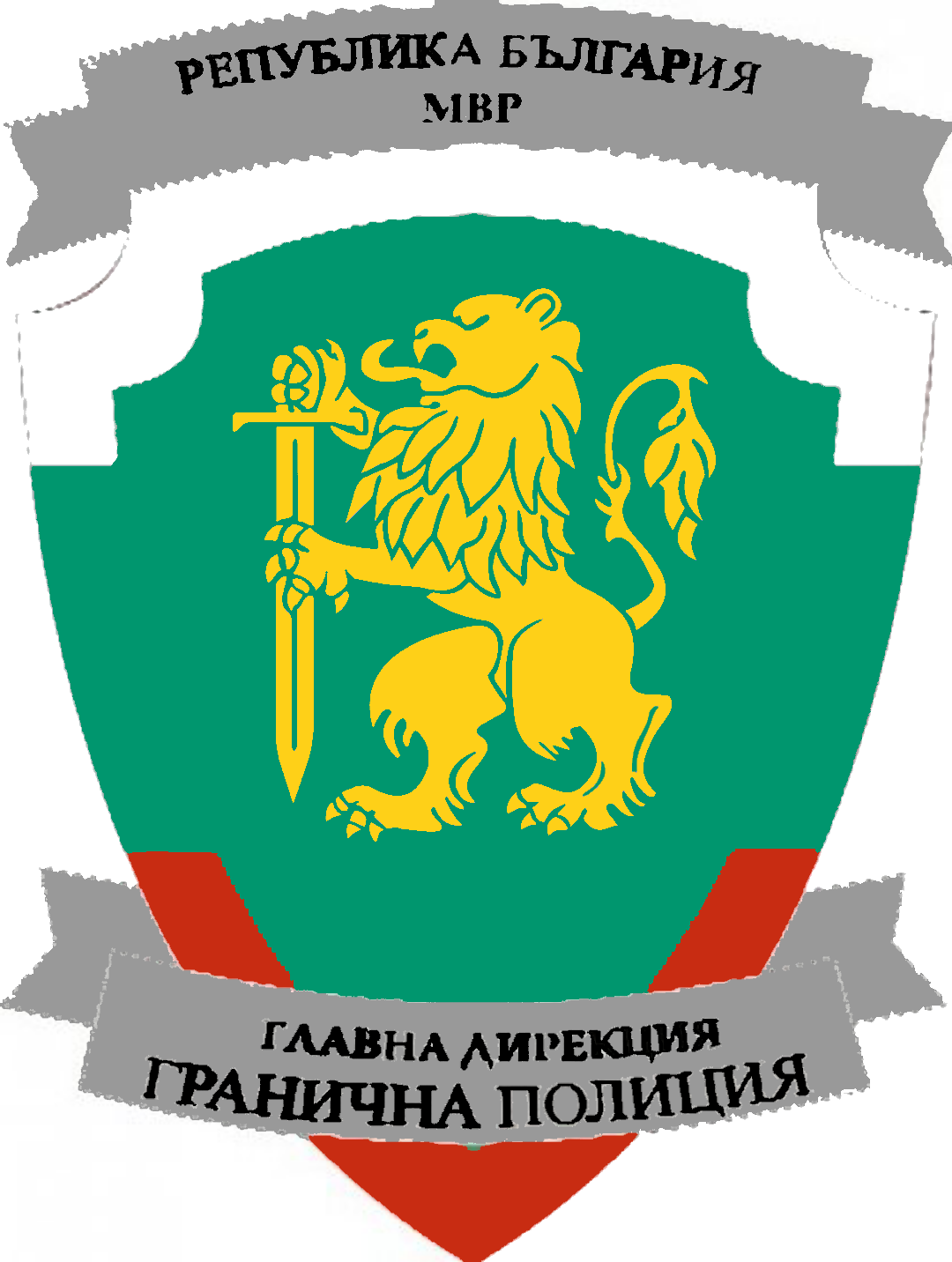
- Logo of Border Police

Jurisdictional structure
- Operations jurisdiction: Bulgaria
- General nature: Civilian police
- Specialist jurisdiction: National border patrol, security, integrity

Operational structure
- Elected officer responsible: Boyko Rashkov, Minister of Interior
- Agency executives: Rositsa Dimitrova, Director; Deyan Mollov, Deputy Director
- Parent agency: Ministry of Interior

Website
- www.mvr.bg/gdgp

The Directorate-General for Border Police (Bulgarian: Главна дирекция „Гранична полиция”) is part of the Bulgarian Ministry of the Interior that is responsible for maintaining border controls at the points of entry and security along the land, sea and riverine borders. It is one of the Ministry's five operational services (along with the Directorate-General for National Police, Directorate-General for Combating Organised Crime, Directorate-General for Fire Safety and Civil Protection and the Specialized Counter-Terrorism Force). The current director of the Border Police is Rositsa Dimitrova.

== Organization ==
Directorate-General for Border Police - the central management authority of the agency, including headquarters services and specialised services, such as intelligence and international coordination departments and training establishments.

- Regional Directorate "Border Police" - Airports (Регионална Дирекция "Гранична Полиция" - Аерогари)
  - Central Departments
  - 4 Border Police Headquarters: Sofia Airport, Plovdiv Airport, Varna Airport, Burgas Airport, provides security to the Bulgarian international airports (Gorna Oryahovitsa Airport also holds an international airport certificate, but since there are no regular scheduled flights to that airport, its security is provided by a gendarmerie detachment).
- Regional Directorate "Border Police" - Ruse (Регионална Дирекция "Гранична Полиция" - Русе), guards the whole northern border with Romania, including the Bulgarian section of the Danube River and the land border section in Dobrudja.
  - Central Departments
  - 7 Border Police Headquarters: Vidin, Kozloduy, Somovit, Svishtov, Ruse, Silistra and General Toshevo
  - "Border Police Ships" Base - Vidin (База "Гранични полицейски кораби" - Видин)

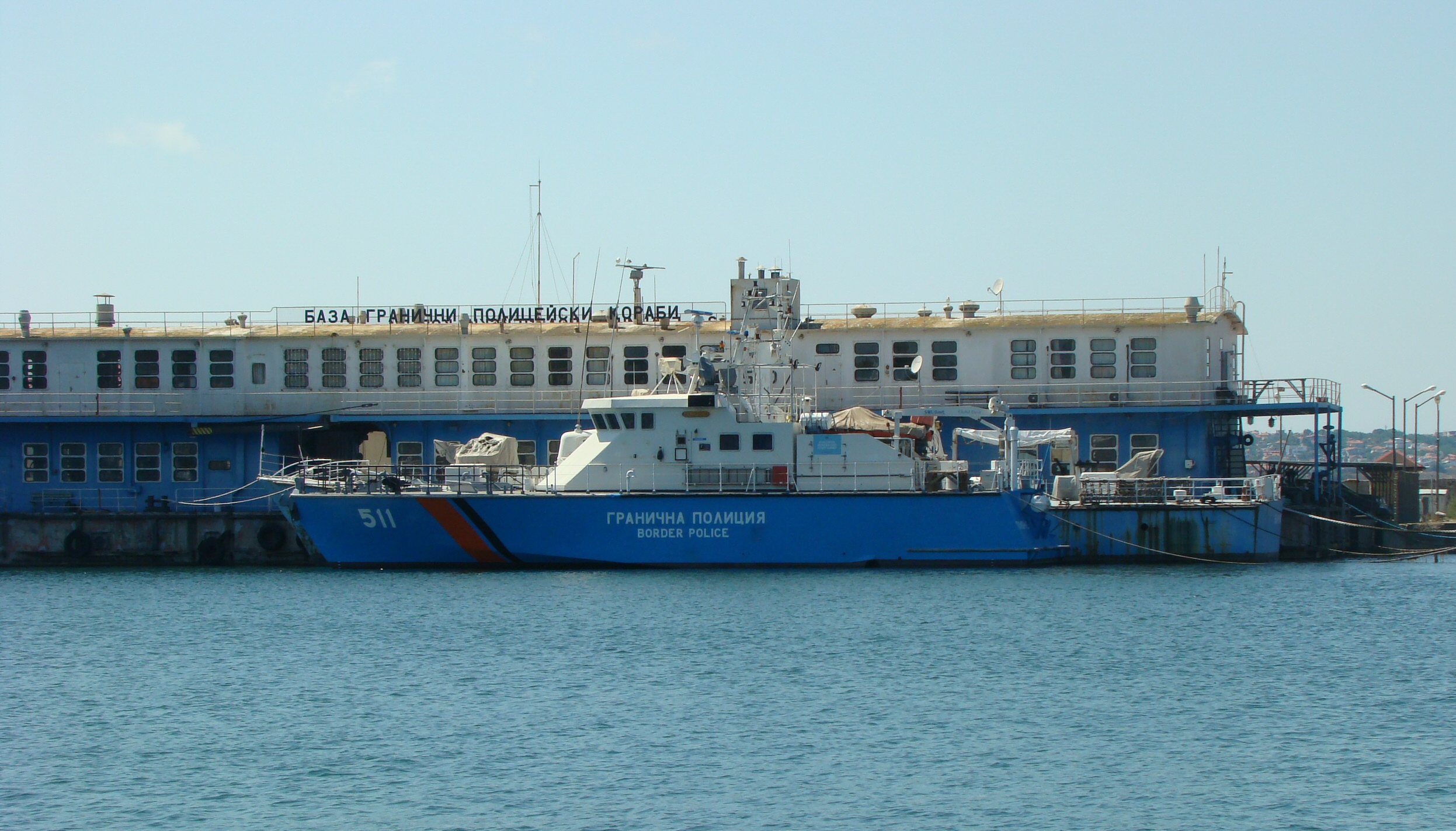
Border Police Ships' Base in Sozopol

- Regional Directorate "Border Police" - Burgas (Регионална Дирекция "Гранична Полиция" - Бургас), guards the whole eastern sea border.
  - Central Departments
  - 4 Border Police Headquarters: Kavarna, Varna, Burgas and Tsarevo
  - "Border Police Ships" Base - Sozopol (База "Гранични полицейски кораби" - Созопол)
- Regional Directorate "Border Police" - Elhovo (Регионална Дирекция "Гранична Полиция" - Елхово), guards the border with Turkey.
  - Central Departments
  - 5 Border Police Headquarters: Malko Tarnovo, Sredets, Bolyarovo, Elhovo and Svilengrad
- Regional Directorate "Border Police" - Smolyan (Регионална Дирекция "Гранична Полиция" - Смолян), guards the border with Greece
  - Central Departments
  - 9 Border Police Headquarters: Novo Selo, Ivaylovgrad, Krumovgrad, Momchilgrad, Zlatograd, Rudozem, Dospat, Gotse Delchev and Petrich
- Regional Directorate "Border Police" - Kyustendil (Регионална Дирекция "Гранична Полиция" - Кюстендил), guards the border with North Macedonia.
  - Central Departments
  - 3 Border Police Headquarters: Zlatarevo, Blagoevgrad and Gyueshevo
- Regional Directorate "Border Police" - Dragoman (Регионална Дирекция "Гранична Полиция" - Драгоман), guards the border with Serbia.
  - Central Departments
  - 6 Border Police Headquarters: Oltomantsi, Tran, Kalotina, Chiprovtsi, Belogradchik and Bregovo
- Specialised force "Aerial Surveillance" (Специализиран отряд "Въздушно наблюдение" - ГДГП), the helicopter squadron of the Border Police, flying 3 AgustaWestland AW109 and 1 AgustaWestland AW139.
  - Central Departments
  - Sofia (Aviation) Base, Bezmer (Aviation) Base
