= Gendarmerie (Bulgaria) =

Bulgarian Gendarmerie Жандармерия
- Insignia

Agency overview
- Formed: 1991
- Dissolved: 2014 (As independent agency)

Jurisdictional structure
- Operations jurisdiction: Bulgaria
- General nature: Gendarmerie; Civilian police

Operational structure
- Parent agency: Ministry of Interior (Bulgaria)

The Bulgarian Gendarmerie (Жандармерия – Zhandarmeriya) is part of the Bulgarian Ministry of Interior or "MoI"/"MVR". (Bulgarian: "Министерство на вътрешните работи" or "МВР", pronounced [mevere]). It forms part of the country's General Directorate "Gendarmerie, Special Operations and Counterterrorism".

It was a militarized special police force deployed to secure important facilities and buildings, respond to riots, and counter militant threats. Its agents were trained to operate in both urban and wilderness environments and carry out a wide range of duties. The Gendarmerie was meant to be a force structure intermediate between the army and the police, which had military status.

== History ==
The Gendarmerie originated from the Internal Troops of the MIA after the transition from a socialist regime to democracy between 1989 and 1991. It was organized as the "National Gendarmerie Service," equal in status and independent from the National Police Service.

The reform of the Ministry of Internal Affairs in 2012 has the service disbanded and its manpower and equipment absorbed into the Police with a change in the naming from Gendarmerie to Specialized Police Forces (Bulgarian: Специализирани полицейски сили, erroneously translated into English as Special Police Forces, which could be seen on some of the daily attire of its service members). The name change was reverted to Gendarmerie in 2014, but the service did not regain its separate status and it remained a part of the Main Directorate of National Police (Главна дирекция "Национална полиция"). As of 2023, it's a part of the General Directorate "Gendarmerie, Special Operations and Counterterrorism", under the Ministry of Interior.

== Organization ==
=== Current structure ===
After the latest reform of the service, its members no longer held military-style ranks, having transferred to the uniform ranking system of the police. At the head of the Gendarmerie is a director with the two-star rank of a senior commissioner, aided by a deputy director with the rank of a commissioner (corresponding to an army colonel).

- Central apparatus:
  - Administrative and Training Sector
  - Sector for Protection of Banking and High Security Institutions
  - Sector for Organization of Protective Measures
  - Commandature Sector
- Territorial organization. Each zone department is headed by a chief inspector (lieutenant-colonel equivalent). The only exception is the ZGD Sofia, as it manpower almost equals the other seven ZGDs combined and is therefore headed by a commissar (a colonel equivalent):
  - Zone Gendarmerie Department Sofia
  - Zone Gendarmerie Department Pleven
  - Zone Gendarmerie Department Plovdiv
  - Zone Gendarmerie Department Montana
  - Zone Gendarmerie Department Kardzhali
  - Zone Gendarmerie Department Burgas
  - Zone Gendarmerie Department Varna
  - Zone Gendarmerie Department Gorna Oryahovitsa

The Gendarmerie units are a high-readiness operational reserve of the Bulgarian police, held centrally under the command of the General Directorate "Gendarmerie, Special Operations and Counterterrorism" . Each of the provincial directorates of the National Police has a similarly equipped and tasked Specialized Police Forces unit and these number from over 530 (in Sofia's metropolitan police department SDVR) to as few as a squad of less than 10 people in most provincial ODMVR departments. These units are visually similar to the Gendarmerie and function in a similar manner, but locally for their respective territorial departments.

A 2020 reform plan of the government called for the integration of the Ministry's primary counter-terror unit – the SOBT and the Gendarmerie Directorate into a new General Directorate of Gendarmerie, Special Operations and Counterterrorism (Жандармерия, специални операции и борба с тероризма" - ГДЖСОБТ) (in a manner similar to the amalgamation of the French Gendarmerie's GIGN and territorial quick reaction units). The plan had encountered serious criticism from within and the Ministry of the Interior, from political parties and security, public order and counter-terror experts, but was nevertheless executed.

Since 2020, the Gendarmerie has been a part of the General Directorate "Gendarmerie, Special Operations and Counterterrorism" together with the SOBT.

=== Ranks ===
The service members had military-style ranks from sergeant to colonel, following a system not used throughout the Bulgarian police forces. The overall commander of the force was usually a Major General.

NATO code	OF-10	OF-9	OF-8	OF-7	OF-6	OF-5	OF-4	OF-3	OF-2	OF-1
Bulgarian Gendarmerie
Bulgarian Gendarmerie				Генерал-майор; General-mayor	Бригаден генерал Brigaden general	Комисар; Komisar	Главен инспектор Glaven inspektor	Старши инспектор Starshi inspektor	Инспектор I степен Inspektor I stepen	Инспектор II степен Inspektor II stepen	Инспектор III степен Inspektor III stepen

NATO code	OR-9	OR-8	OR-7	OR-6	OR-5	OR-4	OR-3	OR-2	OR-1
Bulgarian Gendarmerie
Bulgarian Gendarmerie			Командир на отделение Komandir na otdelenie	Полицай I степен Politsaĭ I stepen	Полицай II степен Politsaĭ II stepen	Полицай III степен Politsaĭ III stepen

== Equipment ==
For riot duty the gendarmerie officers are equipped with Makarov 9x18 pistols, protective gear, gas grenades, police batons and non-lethal weapons and ammunition. When performing high-risk tactical operations they are equipped with protective gear, helmets, Makarov or Glock handguns, stun grenades, MP5 sub-machine guns and 5.45x39mm AKS-74U rifles, which are specialized versions of the original Kalashnikov assault rifle. They also rarely utilize drones.

As for vehicles the Gendarmerie uses a number of Iveco VM92 APCs, Ford Transit vans and Haval H6 SUVs for day-to-day duties. They also use water cannons for riots and demonstrations and a small number of Audi vehicles for special events, to secure VIP transit and to protect the transportation of large amounts of government money and gold.

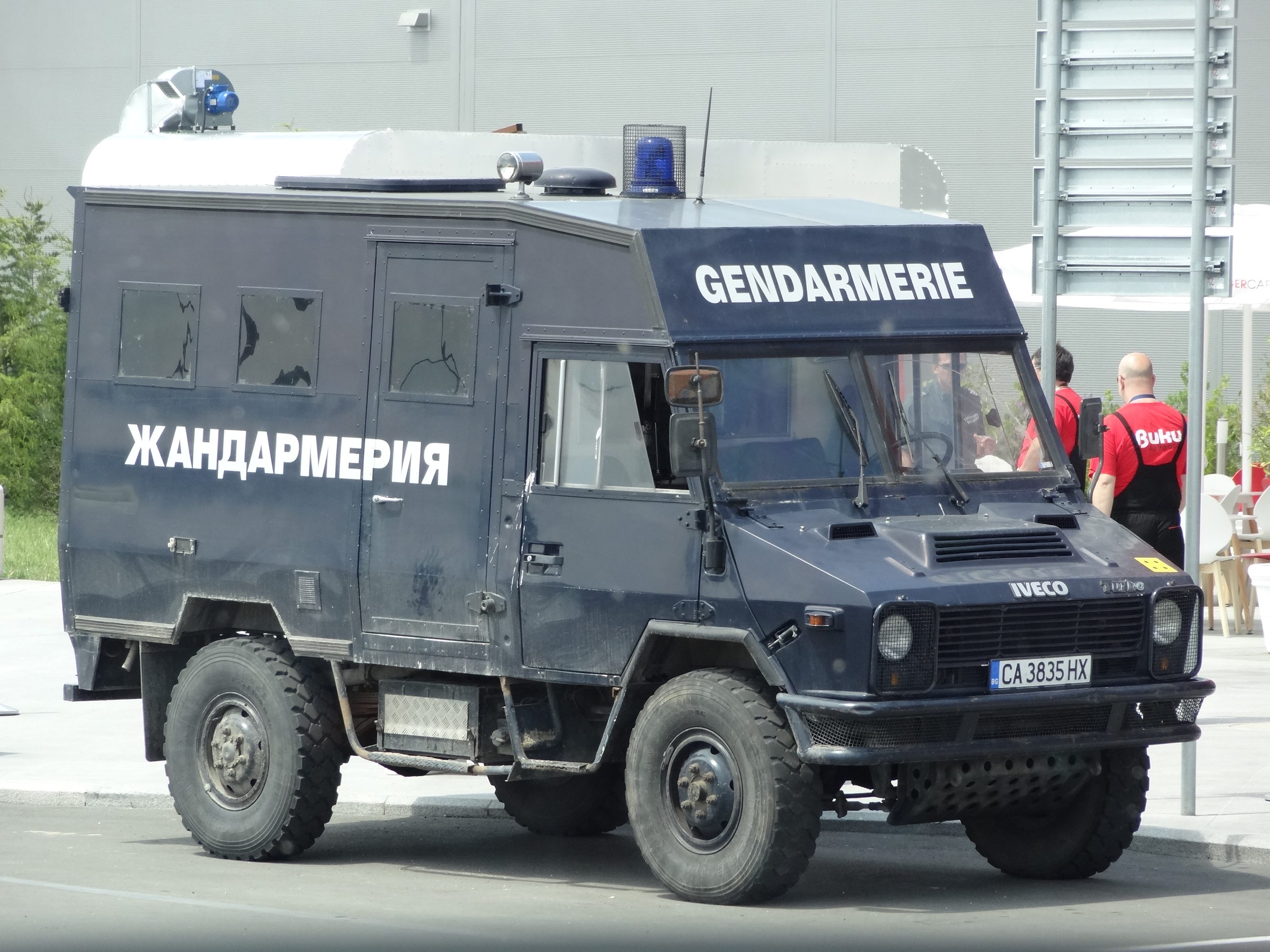
Gendarmerie Iveco VM92 APC
