= Law enforcement in Bulgaria =

Logo of the National Police of Bulgaria

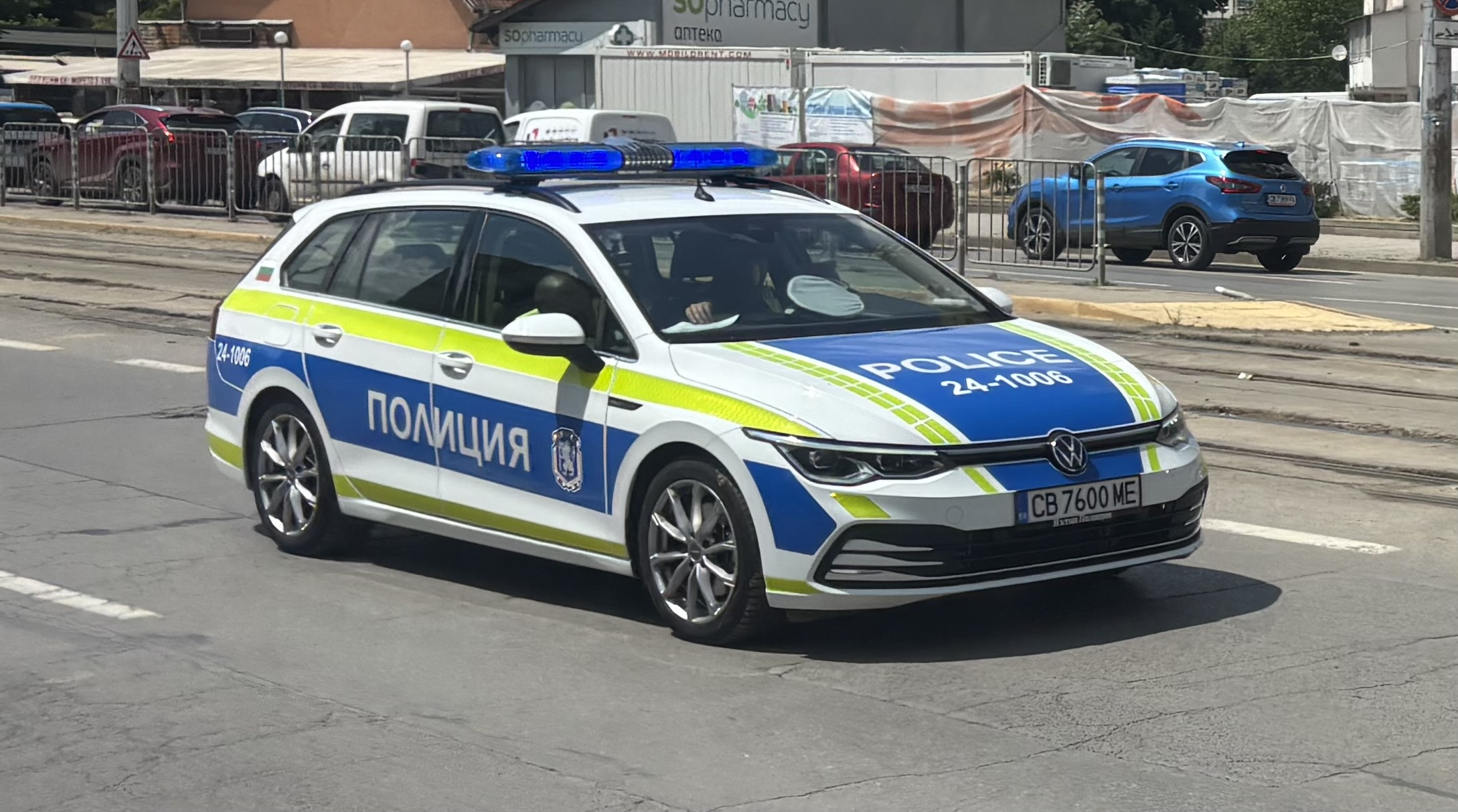
Police Car, Sofia, 2026

Bulgarian law enforcement organisations are mainly subordinate to the Ministry of Interior.

== Overall structure ==
The structure responsible for preservation of public order and citizens’ security and prevention of crime is the National Police Directorate-General in the Ministry of Interior.

The Directorate deals with activities related to protection of public order and providing security service. It also deals with VIP and goods protection outside and inside Bulgaria.

== Agencies and their roles ==
The National Police Service is responsible for combating general crime and supporting the operations of other law enforcement agencies, the National Investigative Service and the Central Office for Combating Organized Crime. The Police Service has criminal and financial sections and national and local offices.

The Central Office for Combating Organized Crime, also under the Ministry of Interior, collects information about national and international crimes involving criminal organizations, mainly trafficking, financial crimes, and domestic and international terrorism. The service also is a coordinating body for other police agencies.

The National Investigative Service, which is part of the judicial system and consists of investigating justices called "sledovateli" (inspectors, investigators), is the national investigative agency for serious crimes, responsible for preparing supporting evidence in criminal cases. In 2005 a new penal code shifted some of that service's caseload to the National Police Service.

The Ministry of Interior also heads the Border Police Service and the National Gendarmerie, a specialized branch for anti-terrorist activity, crisis management and riot control. In 2005 the Border Police, which underwent large-scale reform under European Union (EU) supervision in the early 2000s, had 12,000 personnel.

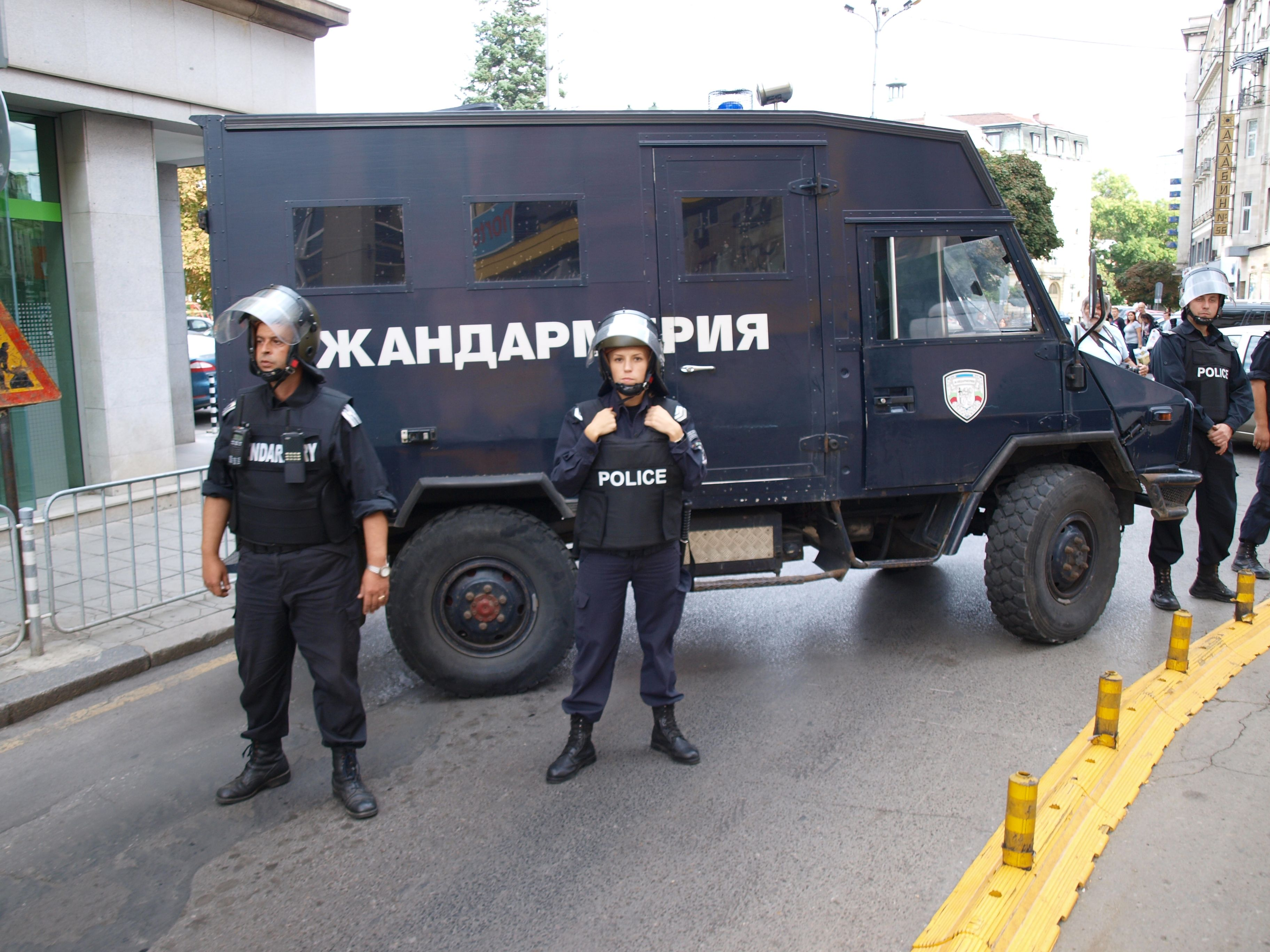
Riot police in Sofia

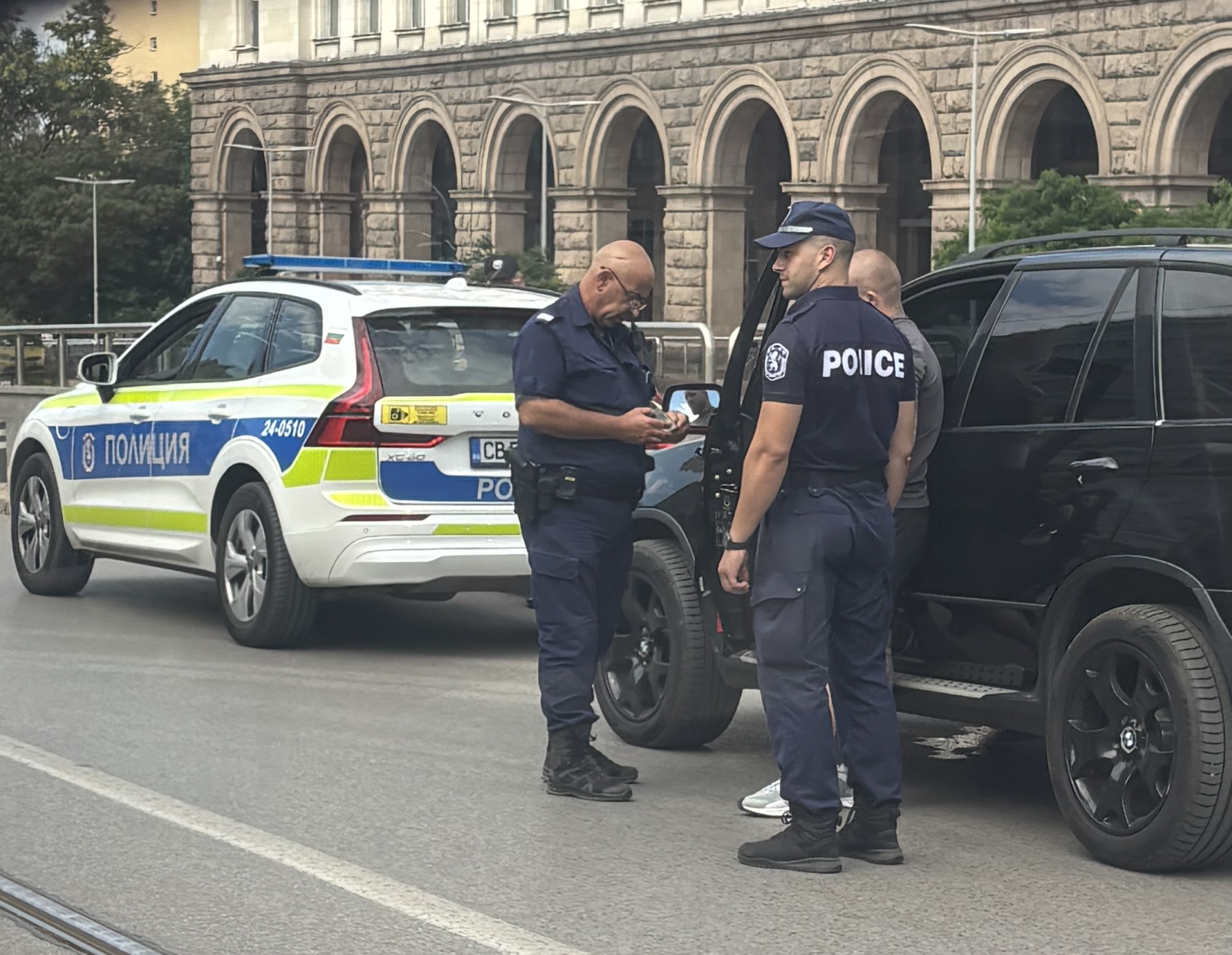
Police Stop in Sofia

== See also ==
- Crime in Bulgaria
- Law of Bulgaria
