= Crime in Varna =

Hub of Bulgarian organized crime

Varna was rumored to be the main hub for Bulgarian organized crime. Some sectors of the economy, including gambling, corporate security, tourism, real estate, and professional sports, are believed to be controlled in part by business groups with links to Communist-era secret services or the military; the TIM group, based in Varna, is one example.

In 2003, Iliya Pavlov, chairman of MG Holding (former Multigroup), owner of the St. Elias resort at Constantine and Helena and president of PFC Cherno more, was shot down in Sofia, as was Emil Kyulev, chairman of DZI Financial Group and owner of the stylish Holiday Club Riviera resort at Golden Sands, in 2005. The perpetrators are still unknown. Varna has also seen some bombings in the past, and is believed to be a hangout for Russian and Chechen mafias.

However, it is noted that in Varna, the mutri presence is by no means as visible as it is in smaller coastal towns and resorts. Over the last couple of years, crime has subsided, which is said to have contributed to Varna's naming as Bulgaria's Best City to Live In (2007); in 2007, the regional police chief was promoted to the helm of the national police service.

In January 2009, the Financial Times said that "communism [was] followed [by] a gritty transition period, including shootings of local mobsters in crowded seaside cafés. But, according to residents, a group of ex-Bulgarian marines nicknamed the Varna Seals eventually managed to expel members of the Russian, Chechen, Ukrainian and Georgian mafias vying for control of the port and the city's underground economy. And today 'you can stroll around the centre late at night without problems.'"

== See also ==
- Crime in Bulgaria
