= Operation Blackwrist =

2017 anti-CSAM police operation

- Operation name: Operation Blackwrist
- Type: Child pornography crackdown

Participants
- Executed by: United States, Bulgaria, New Zealand, Thailand, Australia
- No. of countries participating: 5+

Mission
- Target: boyxzeed.net, boyxzeed2.net

Timeline
- Date executed: 2017

Operation Blackwrist was launched in 2017 by Interpol investigators in Asia. Allegedly, the operation was named after a bracelet worn by one of the offenders. The operation was multinational, involving the United States, Bulgaria, and New Zealand. It was described as an "in-person" operation, in that there were investigators from law enforcement countries around the world working together in physical proximity as opposed to remotely. At the time, Interpol agents located child sexual exploitation material (CSAM) of children who appeared to be from Thailand that was depicted on several The Onion Router (TOR) websites where it was being distributed. The websites that were allegedly the primary focus of the operation were "boyxzeed.net," "boyxzeed," and "boyxzeed2.net."

== Results ==
The first victims were identified in November of 2017, leading to the simultaneous arrests two months later in early 2018 in Thailand and Australia. The main website administrator, based in Thailand, was apprehended, followed by another administrator in Australia. The operation resulted in the rescue of 11 boys in Thailand who were under the age of 13. In total, there were roughly 50 children that were rescued, but the governments' allege that there may have been 100 suspected of being abused. In addition to rescuing the children, the goals of the agencies were to identify the people who were producing and/or posting the materials to the websites. Prosecutions occurred in Thailand, Australia, and the United States.

The servers were located in Bulgaria, so the Bulgarian cybercrime investigators played a role in seizing the servers, which were copied and handed over to Interpol.

There were 9 US arrests related to the operation. Charles Orange was found guilty of possession of child pornography in the Eastern District of Texas.

== Participating law enforcement agencies ==
The participants were:

- Australia:
  - Australian Federal Police (AFP)
  - South Australia Police
- Bulgaria - Bulgaria’s Cybercrime Department at the General Directorate Combating Organized Crime
- Europol
- Interpol
- Thailand - Department of Special Investigations (DSI)
- United States:
  - Homeland Security Investigations (HSI)
  - National Center for Missing & Exploited Children*
- New Zealand - Department of Internal Affairs

* Non-law-enforcement NGO partner
