= 1939 Bulgarian Cup final =

Shipka Sofia	Levski Ruse
2	0
- Date: 3 October 1939
- Venue: Levski Playground, Sofia
- Referee: Dimitar Genchev (Sofia)
- Attendance: 4,000

The 1940 Bulgarian Cup final was the 2nd final of the Bulgarian Cup (in this period the tournament was named Tsar's Cup), and was contested between Shipka Sofia and Levski Ruse on 3 October 1939 at Levski Playground in Sofia. Shipka won the final 2–0 (walkover).

== Match ==
=== Details ===
3 October 1939

Shipka Sofia	2−0	Levski Ruse
Tashkov 18'; Petkov 40'

Levski Playground, Sofia
Attendance: 4,000
Referee: Dimitar Genchev (Sofia)

Shipka	Levski

GK	1	(Bulgaria) Todor Konov
DF	2	(Bulgaria) Stoyan Tanovski
DF	3	(Bulgaria) Kiril Iliev
MF	4	(Bulgaria) Boris Trankov
MF	5	(Bulgaria) Anton Kuzmanov
MF	6	(Bulgaria) Krastyo Konov
FW	7	(Bulgaria) Asen Pavlov
FW	8	(Bulgaria) Kostadin Dimitrov
FW	9	(Bulgaria) Krum Petkov (c)
FW	10	(Bulgaria) Dobromir Dobrev
FW	11	(Bulgaria) Stoyan Tashkov

GK	1	(Bulgaria) Marko Nikolov
DF	2	(Bulgaria) Prodan Novakov
DF	3	(Bulgaria) Borislav Peychev
MF	4	(Bulgaria) Konstantin Novakov (c)
MF	5	(Bulgaria) Ivan Mateev
MF	6	(Bulgaria) Boris Mitev
FW	7	(Bulgaria) Svetoslav Abadzhiev
FW	8	(Bulgaria) Todor Goranov
FW	9	(Bulgaria) Dimitar Nikolaev
FW	10	(Bulgaria) Shami Pinkas
FW	11	(Bulgaria) Nikola Nedev

== See also ==
- 1938–39 Bulgarian National Football Division
