= Ministry of Interior (Bulgaria) =

Government ministry of Bulgaria

Ministry of Internal Affairs of Bulgaria
- Mинистерство на вътрешните работи Ministerstvo na vatreshnite raboti
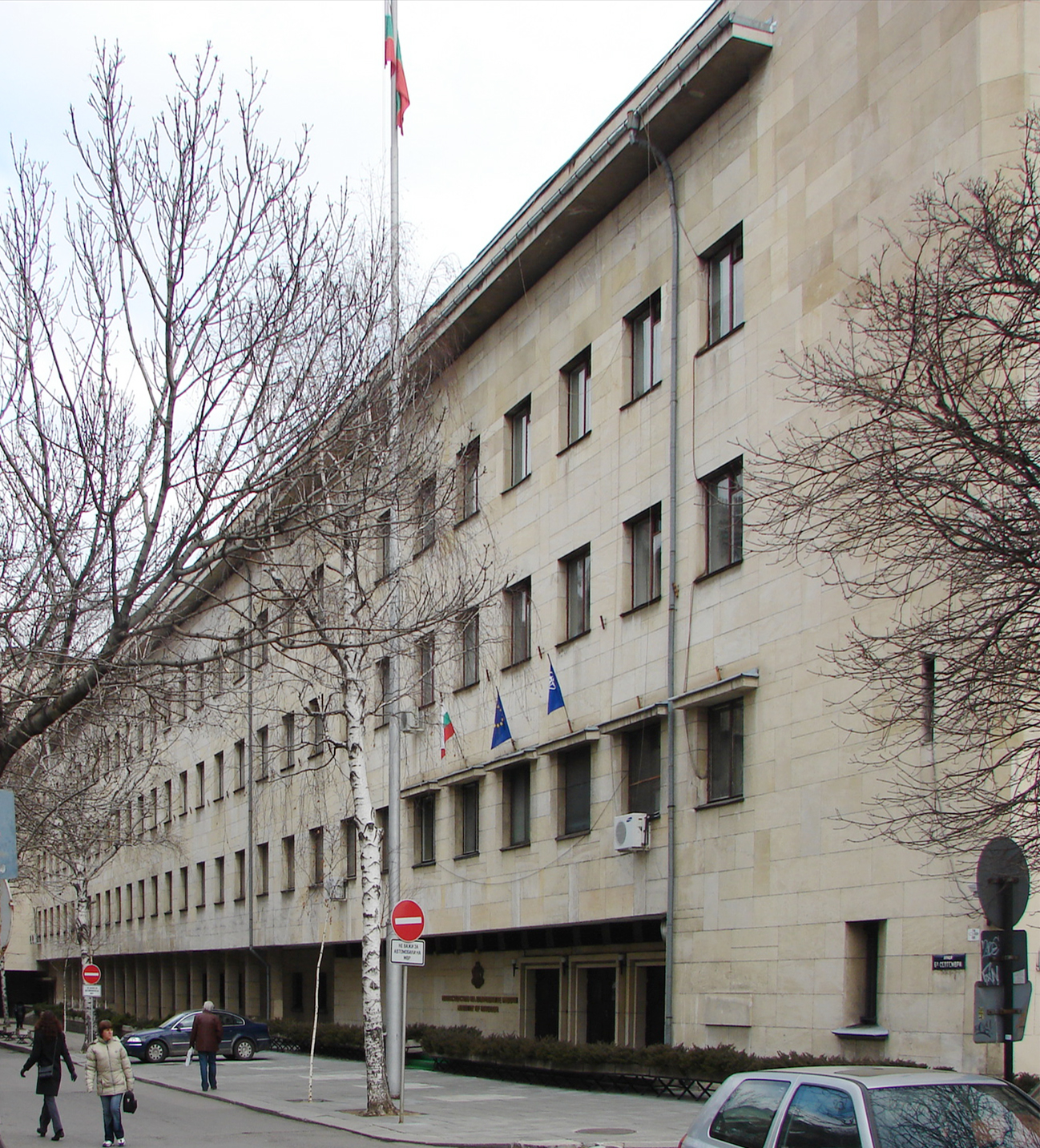
- Ministry of Internal Affairs building in Sofia

Agency overview
- Formed: 1879
- Jurisdiction: Government of Bulgaria
- Agency executive: Ivan Demerdzhiev, PB, Minister of Internal Affairs
- Website: www.mvr.bg/en

The Ministry of Interior (Bulgarian: Mинистерство на вътрешните работи, romanized: Ministerstvo na vatreshnite raboti, abbreviated МВР, MVR) of Bulgaria is the ministry charged with the national security and the upholding of law and order in the country.

The ministry was established in 1879 under Knyaz Alexander of Battenberg with the first prime minister and interior minister of what was then the autonomous Principality of Bulgaria being Todor Burmov.

The current interior minister is Ivan Demerdzhiev, since 8 May 2026.

== Border Troops ==
In the 1980s, the Border Troops (Гранични войски) were a paramilitary formation under the Interior Ministry tasked with guarding Bulgaria's borders. Heavily concentrated on Bulgaria's Iron Curtain border with NATO members Greece and Turkey the Border Troops would have come under the Ministry of People's Defence in times of war. However, the frontier with Romania was also actively defended. After the Cold War the border troops were reformed as the Border Police.

Until 1946 the Bulgarian border guard was a task of the regular army and each infantry regiment in proximity of the border had a border guard company. In 1946 the new Communist regime formed an independent service, dedicated to the border security on August 10, 1946, as the Border Militsiya, but this name lasted only until October 8, when it was renamed to Border Troops. The service initially numbered 8 Border Sectors (Гранични сектори (ГС)). The service was modeled on the Soviet Border Troops. Unlike them the Bulgarian Border Troops were not part of the State Security service, but subordinated to the Ministry of the Interior (between 1962 and 1972 to the Ministry of People's Defence). The internal structure of the troops was overhauled with ministerial order #44 from March 9, 1950, as follows:

- the highest formations (the Border Sectors) were renamed into Border Detachments (Гранични Отряди (ГО), an equivalent of a motorised rifle regiment in the army, but with a smaller manpower, and increased from 8 to 10)
- the battalion equivalents were renamed from Border Sections to Border Commandatures (Гранични Комендатури (ГК))
- the company equivalents were renamed from Border Subsections to Border Outposts (Гранични Застави (ГЗ))

As a military formation each Border Detachment had its Command, Staff and supporting units. The number of the detachments varied through the Communist Era from 8 sectors at the formation of the Border Troops, to 10 in 1950 and 17 at the height of the service's build-up, to 12 in 1989, of which 1 was a training formation. The organization of the Border Troops, as published by the Committee for Disclosing the Documents and Announcing Affiliation of Bulgarian Citizens to the State Security and Intelligence Services of the Bulgarian People's Army (A public commission, authorised by law of the Parliament to study the repressive apparatus of the Communist regime and to establish the connection of individuals to it) in a collection book of declassified documents, was as follows:

Directorate of the Border Troops (Управление на Гранични войски (УГВ))

- Headquarters (Щаб, with 11 departments, such as Operations; Combat Training; Communications; Engineering etc.)
- Intelligence Section (Разузнавателно отделение (РО))
  - Intelligence Desk (Разузнаване (Р))
  - Counter-Intelligence Desk (Контраразузнаване (К))
- Political Section (Политическо отделение (ПО), with 8 departments, such as Political Education; Editorial of the Border Troops official magazine; Technical Editorial; Library etc.)
- Rear (Тил, logistical services, 5 departments)
- Training Border Detachment (Учебен Граничен Отряд (УГО)) (Ivaylovgrad, former 18th Border Detachment)
- Sergeant School for Working Dog Handlers (Сержантска школа за инструктори на служебни кучета (СШИСК) (Berkovitsa)
- Supply and Support Battalion (Батальон за Обслужване и Осигуряване (БОО))
- Border Detachments:
  - 1st Border Detachment - Vidin (1ви Граничен Отряд – Видин (1 ГО))
    - including a Border Ships Division (Дивизион Гранични Кораби) for patrols on the Danube river
  - 2nd Border Detachment - Dragoman (2ри Граничен Отряд – Драгоман (2 ГО))
  - 11th Border Detachment - Kyustendil (11ти Граничен Отряд – Кюстендил (11 ГО))
  - 3rd Border Detachment - Petrich (3ти Граничен Отряд – Петрич (3 ГО))
  - 6th Border Detachment - Gotse Delchev (6ти Граничен Отряд – Гоце Делчев (16 ГО))
  - 4th Border Detachment - Smolyan (4ти Граничен Отряд – Смолян (4 ГО))
  - 5th Border Detachment - Momchilgrad (5ти Граничен Отряд – Момчилград (5 ГО))
  - 13th Border Detachment - Lyubimets (13ти Граничен Отряд – Любимец (13 ГО))
  - 6th Border Detachment - Elhovo (6ти Граничен Отряд – Елхово (6 ГО))
  - 7th Border Detachment - Malko Tarnovo (7ми Граничен Отряд – Малко Търново (7 ГО))
  - 8th Border Detachment - Burgas (8ми Граничен Отряд – Бургас (8 ГО))
    - including a Border Ships Division (Дивизион Гранични Кораби) for patrols on the Bulgarian Black Sea coastline

The border guards were conscripts, which underwent their training at the border detachment they were assigned to. After that those, who have displayed higher skills in the training process were sent to the Training Border Detachment for an NCO course. Of them small numbers were selected for training as working dog handlers at the K-9 Sergeant School. The officer candidates of the Border Troops studied at the Ground Forces Combined Arms Higher School in Veliko Tarnovo and the career development of Border Troops officers was carried out through courses at the Military Academy in Sofia and training institutes of the Soviet Border Troops in the Soviet Union.

=== Interior Troops ===
The Interior Troops (Bulgarian: Вътрешни Войски (ВВ)) did not exist throughout the whole period of Communist rule in Bulgaria. They were formed during two distinct periods in the presence of a significant organized paramilitary force in opposition to the regime. The first such threat was the Goryani movement. In a report to the Central Committee of the Bulgarian Communist Party dated from October 12, 1948, the at the time Minister of the Interior Anton Yugov informs that for combating the anti-communist partizans 13 special combat units with 1 350 men in total have been formed. He brings to the attention of the committee, that due to their composition of regular Militsioners, family men in their mid-30s and older, a rising tension and physical strain has been observed because of the long periods of patrolling and fighting in the mountains where the Goryanes were active. For that reason Yugov suggests that a specialized Interior Troops arm should be formed in order to facilitate the utilization of conscripts for the Ministry of the Interior with the same conditions of military service as the conscripts of the Bulgarian Army, but trained in the specific counter-insurgency skills needed for such operations. In his report the minister suggests that initially about 1 000 conscripts should be trained by the 13 special combat units in order to relieve their personnel, after which additional 3 000 should be inducted to boost their numbers, with the corresponding reduction in manpower of the regular Militsiya by 3 000 men. Later the numbers of the IT increased to a division and even after the Goryani movement was destroyed their build-up continued to over 12 000 in two divisions and two specialized brigades with their own tanks, artillery, AAA, combat engineers etc., before their abrupt disbandment in 1961.

The second installment of the Bulgarian Interior Troops is from 1985 in connection to the Revival Process. A wave of terror attacks in the first half of the 1980s, including a bomb attack on a special passenger train coach for mothers traveling with little children on March 9, 1985, at Bunovo railway station, organized by the Turkish National-Liberation Movement terror organization, called for the re-establishment of a dedicated counter-insurgency paramilitary force in the structure of the Ministry of the Interior, to deal with the internal terror threat in cooperation with the State Security (Държавна Сигурност (ДС)) and the People's Militsiya (Народна Милиция (НМ)). The Interior Troops were tasked with counter-insurgency in mountainous and woodland terrain, riot control and security of locations of particular and strategic importance. The force was reinstated in 1985 and at the Boyana Roundtable Conference in the first half of 1990 convened between the Bulgarian Communist Party (recently renamed to Bulgarian Socialist Party) and the Union of Democratic Forces to reach an agreement about the reform of the country in light of radical changes in Eastern Europe it was publicly made clear (in response to a question), that the Interior Troops number 2 000 men in 6 battalions, plus the SOBT. The latter however is incorrect. The Specialized Counter-Terrorism Force (abbreviated SOBT in Bulgarian) has from its formation to present day (2017) been the premier counter-terrorism unit of the country, strategically subordinated directly to the Minister of the Interior as an independent agency in its own right. The confusion comes from the fact, that a security regiment of the IT has been based in Vranya, near the former Vrana Palace in barracks recently vacated by the State Security's Fifth Department (Department for Safety and Protection) (Пето управление (Управление за безопасност и охрана (УБО)), the higher state functionaries' close protection service. Since the abolition of the Bulgarian monarchy the palace has been turned into an official residence with permanent presence from the Ministry of the Interior. The battalion in question was the quick reaction paramilitary force for the capital Sofia. In fact the Vranya Battalion and the SOBT are located in adjacent barracks, which causes the confusion. The Interior Troops battalions were organised as rifle battalions with BTR-60s, trucks, automatic rifles, machine guns, mortars and anti-tank rockets. In 1990-91 the Border and the Interior Troops were amalgamated into the Troops of the Ministry of the Interior (Войски на МВР), then separated again. In 1993 the Interior Troops were renamed into Gendarmery, the traditional name from the time of the monarchy, banned after that for their role in hunting down communist partizans. Recently the Gendarmery has been absorbed into the Ministry of the Interior's Main Directorate "National Police" and as of 2017 the former Interior Troops and Gendarmery after that exist in the form of Specialized Police Forces (Специализирани Полицейски Сили) within the National Police. In 1989 they consisted of:

- Interior Troops Directorate (Управление "Вътрешни войски") (Sofia) (Detachment 72300)
  - 1st Independent Operational Security Regiment (1ви Самостоятелен Оперативно-охранителен Полк) (Vrana Palace, Sofia) (Detachment 72345 (44270 before the establishment of the IT))
  - 1st Independent Operational Battalion (1ви Самостоятелен Оперативен Батальон) (Kardzhali) (Detachment 72350)
  - 2nd Independent Operational Battalion (2ри Самостоятелен Оперативен Батальон) (Razgrad) (Detachment 72355)
  - 3rd Independent Operational Battalion (3ти Самостоятелен Оперативен Батальон) (Dzhebel) (Detachment 72360)
  - 4th Independent Operational Battalion (4ти Самостоятелен Оперативен Батальон) (Novi Pazar) (Detachment 72365)
  - 5th Independent Operational Battalion (5ти Самостоятелен Оперативен Батальон) (Brezovo) (Detachment 72370)
  - 6th Independent Operational Battalion (6ти Самостоятелен Оперативен Батальон) (Burgas) (Detachment 72375)

== Organisation ==
The Ministry is headed by the Minister of Interior Affairs. The position is considered a power appointment and in the modern Bulgarian history (both during the Socialist period and in the post-1989 democratic period) the Minister is also a Deputy Prime Minister. The Deputy Ministers and a Parliament Secretary form his Political Cabinet along with the Chief of the Political Cabinet.

The professional head of the Ministry's operational agencies is the Chief Secretary of the Ministry of Interior (Bulgarian: Главен секретар на МВР). This is simultaneously a position and the highest officer rank within the Ministry. The role and rank of the Chief Secretary is similar to those of the Chief of Defence within the Bulgarian Ministry of Defence. Three times (and current as of 2019) Prime Minister Boyko Borisov has started his political career after his tenure as Chief Secretary. The head of the Ministry's civil servants is the Administrative Secretary of the Ministry of Interior (Bulgarian: Административен секретар на МВР), responsible for human resources, budget planning, real estates of the Ministry, public relations etc. The rest of organisations within the Ministry (the academy, the Medical Service, the Scientific Studies Institute of Criminology, the Institute of Psychology, the CIS Directorate, internal affairs, financial comptrollers, international cooperation etc.) are directly subordinated to the Minister.

Bulgaria is a unitary state composed of 28 provinces - the capital city of Sofia (an oblast in its own right) and 27 oblasts. The agencies within the Ministry (called Main Directorates and Directorates) are organised at national level under the Chief Secretary. There is also an Oblast Directorate of the Ministry of Interior Affairs (abbreviated ODMVR and followed by the name of the province) within each of the provinces (called oblasts). The only exception is the city of Sofia. Due to its status as the nation's capital, economic powerhouse, most highly and densely populated city and for traditional reasons the Sofia equivalent of the 27 ODMVRs is actually called SDVR, which stands for Capital Directorate for Interior Affairs. These regional departments are also ultimately subordinated to the Chief Secretary. The 27 ODMVRs range in manpower from about 400 (of ODMVR Silistra) to a little over 1 900 (of ODMVR Plovdiv) police officers and civil servants. They are dwarfed by the SDVR of the capital Sofia with its almost 5 100 police officers and civil servants (the ODMVR Sofia, which covers the province around, but excluding the city itself, counts a total of 1 030).

=== Operational agencies under the Chief Secretary ===
==== Main Directorate of Gendarmerie, Special Operations and Counter-Terror ====
A 2020 reform plan of the government called for the integration of the Ministry's primary counter-terror unit - the SOBT and the Gendarmerie Directorate into a new Main Directorate of Gendarmerie, Special Operations and Counter-Terror (Главна дирекция жандармерия, специални операции и борба с тероризма" - ГДЖСОБТ) (in a manner similar to the amalgamation of the French Gendarmerie's GIGN and territorial quick reaction units). The plan has encountered serious criticism from within and without the Ministry of the Interior, political parties and security, public order and counter-terror experts. Major reason for concern is the view, that this action is politically motivated. Bulgaria is a parliamentary republic and the Cabinet of Ministers is the executive power in the country. The security of all high ranking state officials of the legislature, executive and judiciary however was the exclusive jurisdiction of the National Close Protection Service. The NCPS is an agency subordinated to the Office of the President of the Republic of Bulgaria. In the Bulgarian political structure the President is not part of the executive and this is a source of ever present tension between him and the incumbent Prime Minister. In the middle of 2020 the Chief Public Prosecutor Ivan Geshev (by Constitution the Bulgarian State Prosecution is part of the legislature) broke the NCPS monopoly by waiving his protection detail by the service and forming a new one under the Protection Bureau (Бюро за охрана). The Bureau of less than a hundred employees acts as a witness protection service under direct subordination to the Main Prosecution (Главна прокуратура, the Office of the Chief Public Prosecutor). At the same time the parliamentary faction of the main ruling party motioned through parliament the project for the new agency with the significant addition of close protection of high ranking state officials to the missions already assigned to the SFCT and the Gendarmerie. The reform project passed through Parliament in the end of 2020 and took effect on January 1, 2021.

===== Specialised Unit for Combating Terrorism =====
The SOBT (Bulgarian: Специализиран отряд за Борба с тероризма, СОБТ) is the country's premier counter-terror unit. It consists of roughly 150 operatives and staff and support personnel. It is located near the former royal residence in the Vrana area at the outskirts of the capital Sofia. The Force is directly subordinated to the Minister and engages in the most complicated cases. Most of the other agencies within the ministry have their own SWAT teams and the occasions in which the SOBT has been deployed in operations have decreased in the 21st century. The Force trains regularly with the special forces of the Bulgarian Army, the SWAT teams of the Sofia Police Department (SDVR), the Main Directorate "Combat Against The Organised Crime" (GDBOP), the Gendarmery, the Border Police and teams of the Attorney General's Office, as well as similar foreign CT units, such as the French RAID, the German GSG 9 etc.

===== Directorate “Gendarmery” =====
The Gendarmery Directorate is the main militarised arm for riot control, security of critical infrastructure of national importance, such as nuclear power plants, ports, pipelines, foreign embassies and diplomatic missions in the Republic of Bulgaria. The National Police is organised in central departments under the Main Directorate in Sofia and 28 provincial departments. The Gendarmery does not follow that model, instead it is organised in a small central apparatus and 8 Zonal Gendarmery Departments, covering multiple provinces. Unlike classic examples such as the French Gendarmerie nationale, the Italian Carabinieri, the Turkish Jandarma or the Dutch Koninklijke Marechaussee the Bulgarian Gendarmery has no task to enforce military discipline in the Armed Forces. This is the jurisdiction of the Military Police Service under the Bulgarian Ministry of Defence.

- Director of Gendarmery
  - services directly subordinated to the Director
  - Zonal Gendarmery Department Sofia
  - Zonal Gendarmery Department Montana
  - Zonal Gendarmery Department Pleven
  - Zonal Gendarmery Department Gorna Oryahovitsa
  - Zonal Gendarmery Department Varna
  - Zonal Gendarmery Department Burgas
  - Zonal Gendarmery Department Plovdiv
  - Zonal Gendarmery Department Kardzhali

==== Main Directorate "National Police" ====
The Main Directorate "National Police" (Bulgarian: Главна дирекция "Национална полиция", ГДНП) is the nations's primary law enforcement organisation. It includes various services, such as Security Police, Criminal Police, Transport Police, Traffic Police etc. It also included the Gendarmery Directorate until January 1, 2021.

- Director of MDNP
  - "Criminal Contingent and Prevention" Sector
  - "Operational Analysis Centre" Sector
  - "Expert-Criminalistic Activities" Sector
- Deputy Director of MDNP in charge of
  - Criminal Police
  - Economic Police
- Deputy Director of MDNP in charge of
  - Investigative Department
  - Department for Methodic Guidance of Investigations
- Deputy Director of MDNP in charge of
  - Security Police
  - Traffic Police

==== Main Directorate "Combat Against The Organised Crime" ====
The Main Directorate is tasked with the prevention of serious crimes such as drug trafficking, human trafficking, abductions etc. Due to its purpose it is also colloquially known as the anti-Mafia service.

==== Main Directorate "Border Police" ====
The Main Directorate "Border Police" is responsible for the security of the border crossings and the prevention of illegal entering of the territory of the Republic of Bulgaria. The service does not carry law enforcement tasks in the interior of the country, however, operating highly sophisticated land-based surveillance equipment, helicopters and sea and riverine patrol craft, the Border Police is regularly engaged in search and rescue operations for missing persons and pursuit of dangerous criminals in a supporting capacity.

- Director of Border Police
  - services directly subordinated to the Director
  - Regional Directorate "Border Police" - Airports (Sofia)
    - Border Police HQ Sofia IAP
    - Border Police HQ Plovdiv IAP
    - Border Police HQ Varna IAP
    - Border Police HQ Burgas IAP
  - Regional Directorate "Border Police" - Ruse
    - Border Police Ships Base - Vidin
  - Regional Directorate "Border Police" - Burgas
    - Border Police Ships Base - Sozopol
  - Regional Directorate "Border Police" - Elhovo
  - Regional Directorate "Border Police" - Smolyan
  - Regional Directorate "Border Police" - Kyustendil
  - Regional Directorate "Border Police" - Dragoman
  - Specialised Aerial Surveillance Unit (Sofia IAP)
    - Sofia (Aviation) Base - 1 x AgustaWestland AW139, 3 x AgustaWestland AW109P
    - Bezmer (Aviation) Base - helicopters on temporary deployment from Sofia Base

==== Main Directorate "Fire Safety and Civil Protection" ====
The Main Directorate (Bulgarian: Главна дирекция "Пожарна безопасност и защита на населението") is responsible for fire-fighting, reaction to natural disasters, emergency situations and rescue operations. The Civil Protection portfolio was for a long time under the Ministry of Defence. The Stanishev Government has combined the MIA's fire-fighting service, the MoD's civil protection service and the wartime stocks agency of the Council of Ministers into a new "mega" Ministry of Emergency Situations. The new ministry was later dissolved, with the fire fighters returning under the MIA and the wartime stocks administration returning to the oversight of the Council of Ministers. Civil Protection was retained merged with the Fire Protection Service and joined the MIA. The Main Directorate consists of departments directly under the Director of the service and 28 territorial departments (the Capital Directorate for Fire Safety and Civil Protection in Sofia and 27 Regional Directorates for Fire Safety and Civil Protection in each of the 27 oblasts).

== List of ministers ==
No.	Portrait	Name (Birth–Death)	Took office	Left office	Political party	Cabinet
Ministers of Interior (1879–1912)
1		Todor Burmov (1834–1906)	17 July 1879	6 December 1879	Conservative Party	
2		Dimitar Grekov (1847–1901)	6 December 1879	11 December 1879	Conservative Party	
3		Vladimir Rogge (1843–1906)	11 December 1879	31 January 1880	Independent	
4		Todor Ikonomov (1835–1892)	31 January 1880	7 April 1880	Conservative Party	
5		Georgi Tishev (1848–1926)	7 April 1880	10 December 1880	Liberal Party	
6		Dragan Tsankov (1828–1911)	10 December 1880	29 December 1880	Liberal Party	
7		Petko Slaveykov (1827–1895)	29 December 1880	9 May 1881	Liberal Party	
8		Johann Casimir Ehrnrooth (1833–1913)	9 May 1881	13 July 1881	Imperial Russian Army	
9		Arnold Remlingen (1841–1900)	13 July 1881	12 January 1882	Imperial Russian Army	
10		Grigor Nachovich (1845–1920)	12 January 1882	5 July 1882	Conservative Party	
11		Leonid Sobolev (1844–1913)	5 July 1882	16 April 1883	Imperial Russian Army	
12		Nestor Markov (1836–1916)	16 April 1883	15 August 1883	Independent	
(11)		Leonid Sobolev (1844–1913) (2nd time)	15 August 1883	19 September 1883	Imperial Russian Army	
(6)		Dragan Tsankov (1828–1911) (2nd time)	19 September 1883	11 July 1884	Progressive Liberal Party	
(7)		Petko Slaveykov (1827–1895) (2nd time)	11 July 1884	12 February 1885	Liberal Party	
13		Nikola Suknarov (1849–1894)	12 February 1885	2 April 1885	Liberal Party	
14		Petko Karavelov (1843–1903)	2 April 1885	21 August 1886	Liberal Party	
(6)		Dragan Tsankov (1828–1911) (3rd time)	21 August 1886	24 August 1886	Progressive Liberal Party	
15		Vasil Radoslavov (1854–1929)	24 August 1886	10 July 1887	Liberal Party (Radoslavists)	
16		Georgi Stranski (1847–1904)	10 July 1887	1 September 1887	People's Liberal Party	
17		Stefan Stambolov (1854–1895)	1 September 1887	31 May 1894	People's Liberal Party	
18		Konstantin Stoilov (1853–1901)	31 May 1894	13 November 1896	People's Party	
19		Nayden Benev (1857–1909)	13 November 1896	30 January 1899	People's Party	
(15)		Vasil Radoslavov (1854–1929) (3rd time)	30 January 1899	10 December 1900	Liberal Party (Radoslavists)	
20		Racho Petrov (1861–1942)	10 December 1900	4 March 1901	Independent	
21		Mihail Sarafov (1854–1924)	4 March 1901	22 March 1902	Progressive Liberal Party	
22		Aleksandar Lyudskanov (1854–1922)	22 March 1902	18 May 1903	Progressive Liberal Party	
23		Dimitar Petkov (1858–1907)	18 May 1903	11 March 1907	People's Liberal Party	
24		Nikola Genadiev (1868–1923)	11 March 1907	16 March 1907	People's Liberal Party	
25		Petar Gudev (1862–1932)	16 March 1907	29 January 1908	People's Liberal Party	
26		Mihail Takev (1864–1920)	29 January 1908	18 September 1910	Democratic Party	
27		Nikola Mushanov (1872–1951)	18 September 1910	29 March 1911	Democratic Party	
(22)		Aleksandar Lyudskanov (1854–1922) (2nd time)	29 March 1911	14 January 1912	Progressive Liberal Party	
Ministers of Interior and Public Health (1912–1946)
(22)		Aleksandar Lyudskanov (1854–1922) (2nd time)	14 January 1912	14 June 1913	Progressive Liberal Party	
28		Mihail Madzarov (1854–1944)	14 June 1913	17 July 1913	People's Party	
(15)		Vasil Radoslavov (1854–1929) (4th time)	17 July 1913	4 October 1915	Liberal Party (Radoslavists)	
29		Hristo Popov (1858–1951)	4 October 1915	7 September 1916	Liberal Party (Radoslavists)	
(15)		Vasil Radoslavov (1854–1929) (5th time)	7 September 1916	21 June 1918	Liberal Party (Radoslavists)	
(26)		Mihail Takev (1864–1920) (2nd time)	21 June 1918	28 November 1918	Democratic Party	
(27)		Nikola Mushanov (1872–1951) (2nd time)	28 November 1918	7 May 1919	Democratic Party	
30		Krastyo Pastuhov (1874–1949)	7 May 1919	6 October 1919	Bulgarian Social Democratic Workers' Party (Broad Socialists)	
31		Aleksandar Dimitrov (1878–1921)	6 October 1919	24 June 1921	Bulgarian Agrarian National Union	
32		Konstantin Tomov (1888–1935)	24 June 1921	9 November 1921	Bulgarian Agrarian National Union	
33		Aleksandar Radolov (1883–1945)	9 November 1921	5 January 1922	Bulgarian Agrarian National Union	
34		Rayko Daskalov (1886–1923)	5 January 1922	9 February 1923	Bulgarian Agrarian National Union	
35		Aleksandar Obbov (1887–1975)	9 February 1923	12 March 1923	Bulgarian Agrarian National Union	
36		Hristo Stoyanov (1892–1970)	12 March 1923	9 June 1923	Bulgarian Agrarian National Union	
37		Ivan Rusev (1872–1945)	9 June 1923	4 January 1926	Democratic Alliance	
38		Andrey Lyapchev (1866–1933)	4 January 1926	29 June 1931	Democratic Alliance	
(27)		Nikola Mushanov (1872–1951) (3rd time)	29 June 1931	12 October 1931	Democratic Party	
39		Aleksandar Girginov (1879–1953)	12 October 1931	19 May 1934	Democratic Party	
40		Petar Midilev (1875–1939)	19 May 1934	22 January 1935	Zveno	
41		Krum Kolev (1890–1970)	22 January 1935	21 April 1935	Bulgarian Army	
42		Rashko Atanasov (1884–1945)	21 April 1935	23 November 1935	Independent	
43		Georgi Sapov (1873–1936)	23 November 1935	4 July 1936	Independent	
44		Ivan Krasnovski (1882–1941)	4 July 1936	24 January 1938	Independent	
45		Nikolay Nikolaev (1887–1961)	24 January 1938	14 November 1938	Independent	
46		Nikola Nedev (1886–1970)	14 November 1938	15 February 1940	Independent	
47		Petar Gabrovski (1898–1945)	15 February 1940	14 September 1943	Independent	
48		Docho Hristov (1895–1945)	14 September 1943	1 June 1944	Independent	
49		Aleksandar Stanishev (1886–1945)	1 June 1944	2 September 1944	Independent	
50		Vergil Dimov (1901–1979)	2 September 1944	9 September 1944	Bulgarian Agrarian National Union	
51		Anton Yugov (1904–1991)	9 September 1944	22 November 1946	Bulgarian Communist Party	
Ministers of Interior (1946–1968)
51		Anton Yugov (1904–1991)	22 November 1946	6 August 1949	Bulgarian Communist Party	
52		Rusi Hrizostov (1914–1990)	6 August 1949	6 January 1951	Bulgarian Communist Party	
53		Georgi Tsankov (1913–1990)	6 January 1951	17 March 1962	Bulgarian Communist Party	
54		Diko Dikov (1910–1985)	17 March 1962	27 December 1968	Bulgarian Communist Party	
Minister of Interior and State Security (1968–1969)
55		Angel Solakov (1922–1998)	27 December 1968	27 February 1969	Bulgarian Communist Party	
Ministers of Interior (1969–present)
55		Angel Solakov (1922–1998)	27 February 1969	9 July 1971	Bulgarian Communist Party	
56		Angel Tsanev (1912–2003)	9 July 1971	7 June 1973	Bulgarian Communist Party	
57		Dimitar Stoyanov (1928–1999)	7 June 1973	19 December 1988	Bulgarian Communist Party	
58		Georgi Tanev (born 1943)	19 December 1988	27 December 1989	Bulgarian Communist Party	
59		Atanas Semerdzhiev (1924–2015)	27 December 1989	2 August 1990	Bulgarian Communist Party	
60		Stoyan Stoyanov (born 1945)	2 August 1990	5 September 1990	Bulgarian Socialist Party	
61		Pencho Penev (born 1947)	5 September 1990	20 December 1990	Bulgarian Socialist Party	
62		Hristo Danov (1922–2003)	20 December 1990	8 November 1991	Independent	
63		Yordan Sokolov (1933–2016)	8 November 1991	30 December 1992	Union of Democratic Forces	
64		Viktor Mihaylov (born 1944)	30 December 1992	17 October 1994	Independent	Berov
65		Chavdar Chervenkov (born 1949)	17 October 1994	26 January 1995	Independent	Indzhova
66		Lyubomir Nachev (1954–2006)	26 January 1995	10 May 1996	Bulgarian Socialist Party	Videnov
67		Nikolay Dobrev (1947–1999)	10 May 1996	12 February 1997	Bulgarian Socialist Party	Videnov
68		Bogomil Bonev (born 1957)	12 February 1997	21 December 1999	Union of Democratic Forces	Sofiyanski; Kostov
69		Emanuil Yordanov (born 1960)	21 December 1999	24 July 2001	Union of Democratic Forces	Kostov
70		Georgi Petkanov (born 1966)	24 July 2001	17 August 2005	National Movement Simeon II	Sakskoburggotski
71		Rumen Petkov (born 1961)	17 August 2005	24 April 2008	Bulgarian Socialist Party	Stanishev
72		Mihail Mikov (born 1960)	24 April 2008	27 July 2009	Bulgarian Socialist Party	Stanishev
73		Tsvetan Tsvetanov (born 1965)	27 July 2009	13 March 2013	GERB	Borisov I
74		Petya Parvanova (born 1960)	13 March 2013	29 May 2013	Independent	Raykov
75		Tsvetlin Yovchev (born 1964)	29 May 2013	6 August 2014	Bulgarian Socialist Party	Oresharski
76		Yordan Bakalov (born 1960)	6 August 2014	7 November 2014	Independent	Bliznashki
		Yordan Bakalov (born 1960)	7 November 2014	11 March 2015	GERB	Borisov II
77		Rumyana Bachvarova (born 1959)	11 March 2015	27 January 2017	GERB	Borisov II
78		Plamen Uzunov (born 1972)	27 January 2017	4 May 2017	Independent	Gerdzhikov
79		Valentin Radev (born 1958)	4 May 2017	20 September 2018	GERB	Borisov III
80		Mladen Marinov (born 1971)	20 September 2018	23 July 2020	GERB	Borisov III
81		Hristo Terziyski (born 1968)	24 July 2020	12 May 2021	GERB	Borisov III
82		Boyko Rashkov (born 1954)	12 May 2021	2 August 2022	We Continue the Change	Yanev I Yanev II; Petkov
83		Ivan Demerdzhiev (born 1975)	2 August 2022	6 June 2023	Independent	Donev I Donev II
84		Kalin Stoyanov (born 1981)	6 June 2023	27 August 2024	Independent	Denkov; Glavchev I
85		Atanas Ilkov (born 1964)	27 August 2024	16 January 2025	Independent	Glavchev II
86		Daniel Mitov (born 1977)	16 January 2025	19 February 2026	GERB	Zhelyazkov
87		Emil Dechev (born 1970)	19 February 2026	8 May 2026	Independent	Gyurov
(83)		Ivan Demerdzhiev (born 1975)	8 May 2026	Incumbent	Progressive Bulgaria	Radev
