= Mladen Marinov =

Bulgarian politician (born 1971)

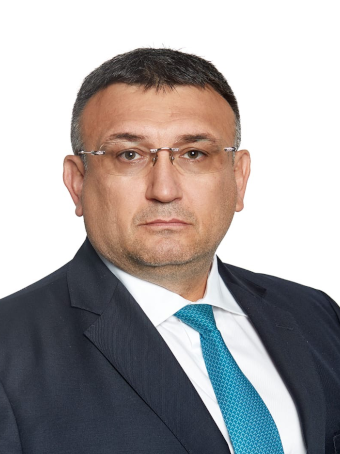
- Marinov in 2021

Member of the National Assembly
- Incumbent
- Assumed office 15 April 2021
- Constituency: Sofia Province

Minister of Interior
- In office 20 September 2018 – 24 July 2020
- Prime Minister: Boyko Borisov
- Preceded by: Valentin Radev
- Succeeded by: Hristo Terziyski

Personal details
- Born: 21 November 1971 (age 54)
- Party: GERB

Mladen Naydenov Marinov (Bulgarian: Младен Найденов Маринов; born 21 November 1971) is a Bulgarian politician serving as a member of the National Assembly since 2021. From 2018 to 2020, he served as minister of interior.
