= Crime in Bulgaria =

- Homicide: 1.2 (2024)
- Assault: 56.7 (2023)
- Burglary: 43.9 (2024)
- Theft: 364.2 (2024)
- Fraud: 40.7 (2024)
- Corruption: 7.7 (2024)
- Bribery: 1.2 (2024)
- Money laundering: 0.8 (2024)
- Rape: 1.1 (2023)
- Sexual violence: 9.2 (2023)
- reported per 100,000 inhabitants

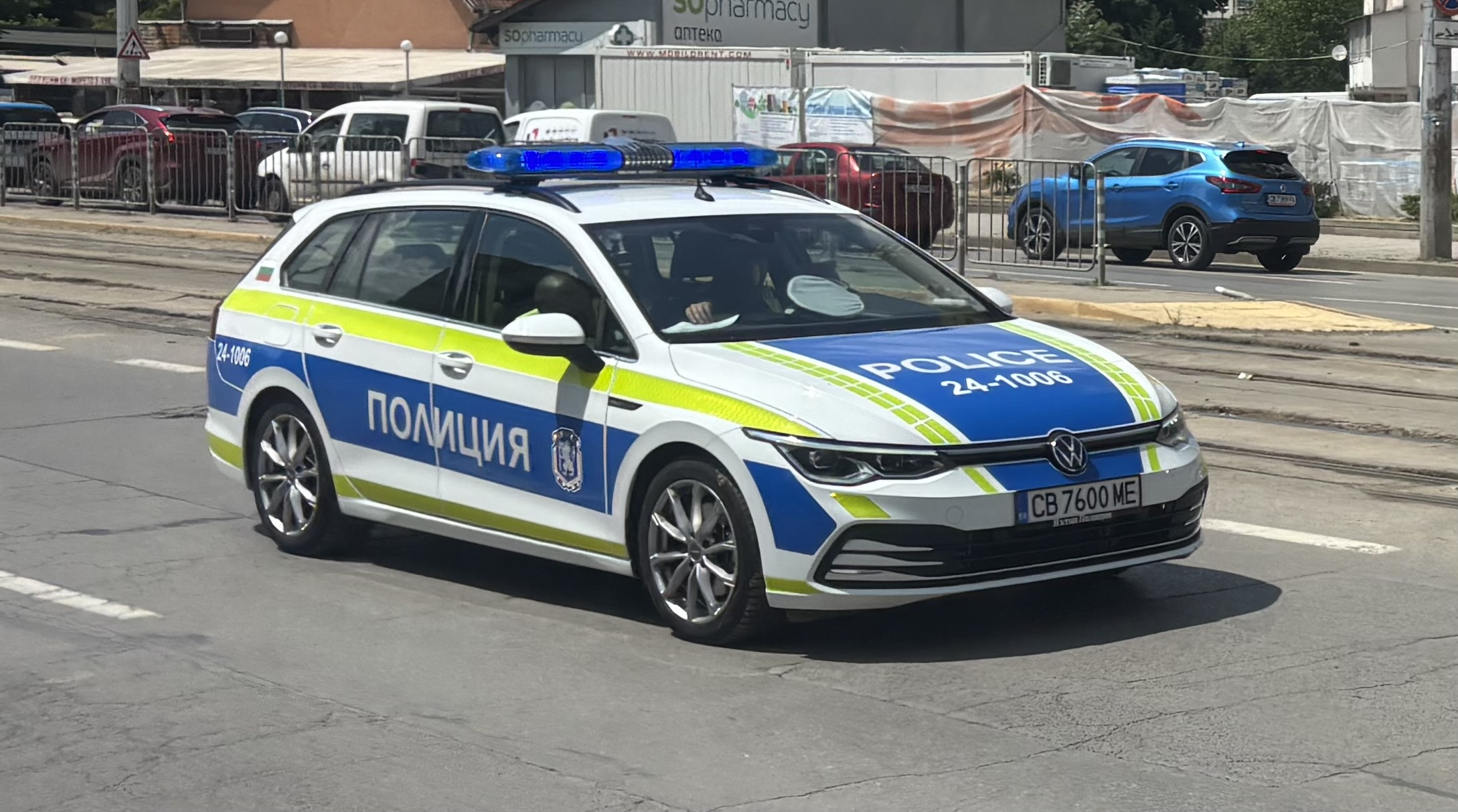
A new VW police car in Sofia 2026

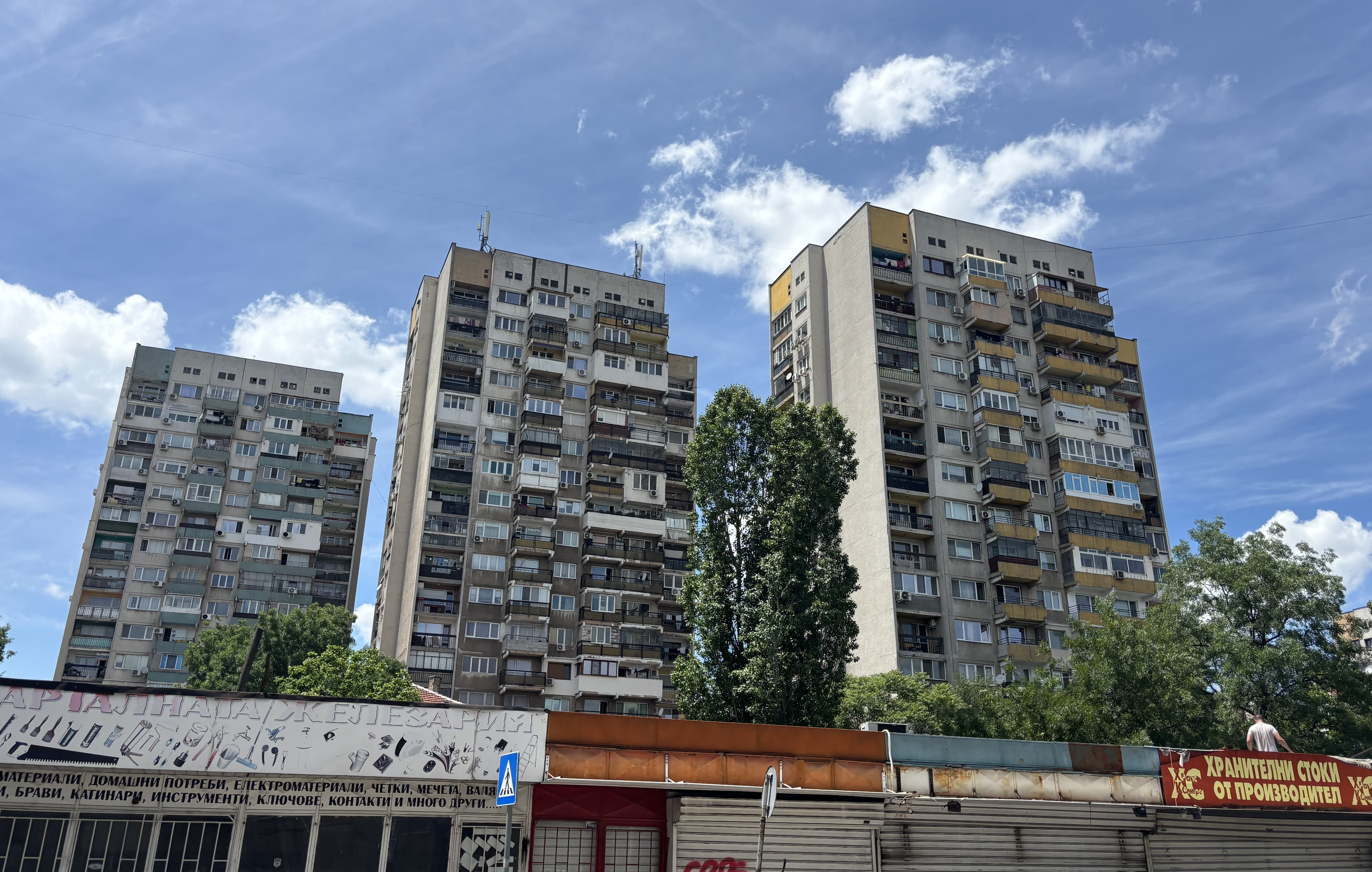
Socialist blocks, Bulgarian: панелки, in Krasno Polyana, Sofia, 2026.

Crime in Bulgaria is combated by the Bulgarian police and other agencies.

Bulgaria is generally considered to be a safe country within Europe. Crime levels in the country are generally lower than in several western European countries. Sofia is ranked at place 76 for how dangerous a European city is, that means 75 European cities are more dangerous, under it mostly western European cities like place 1 Marseille, place 2 Birmingham, and place 3 Grenoble.

Many visitors to Bulgaria may be under the impression that areas with more aging infrastructure and Soviet-era apartment blocks are inherently unsafe. Similar types of infrastructure are found in several other Western European countries, that are considered to be unsafe, or impoverished areas. However, these areas within Bulgaria are mostly ordinary residential areas that do not exhibit the same criminal activity or social problems as some of the more well known banlieues in France or disadvantaged areas in Scandinavian countries.

Although Bulgaria does experience issues relating to corruption and organized crime, these issues are typically related to the country’s political and economic elites, construction projects, business moguls, smuggling and the drug trade. These issues do not directly impact tourists or the general public within the country.

Like in any other country in the world, tourists should take normal precautions and to remain aware of their surroundings. Areas like Fakulteta in the capital city of Sofia have a relatively large population of Roma that reside in these communities. These districts are generally not of interest to the majority of Sofia’s residents. As such, tourists and visitors may encounter unusual reactions or even suspicions from the locals, which may sometimes lead to uncomfortable social interactions between the two groups. But since most tourists don't go in these areas its not so relevant.

The US Government ranks Germany as "Level 2 - Exercise increased caution" for terrorism, an ranks the UK Level 2 too but for unrest, crime and terrorism. Bulgaria gets ranked by the US Government as the safest Level (1) and is therefore considered safer than Germany and UK and France.

== Crime by type ==
=== Murder ===
In the recent rankings (2023) Bulgaria had a rate of 1.08. / 100.000 population. For comparison: USA: 5.76 and UK: 1.14, France: 1.33. and Germany: 0.91.

In comparison 1995, post-Communist Bulgaria's murder rate peaked at 5.83. (USA rate today). Contract killings aimed at bosses of organized crime groups were a problem but these mostly decreased following the arrest of five “Killers” gang members starting in 2010. In 2014, another “Killers” group was suspected of being responsible for the contract killing of customs officers in 1998. In 2014, four contract murders that targeted criminals were reported.

However, from 2020 onward, mafia-related incidents have risen again and contract killings have been both carried out and unsuccessfully attempted. Racketeering amongst most Bulgarian businesses has remained a problem throughout the country.

=== Corruption ===
Corruption is a big problem in Bulgaria. In 2011, a survey showed that one out of every four Bulgarians who dealt with university exams, school authorities, doctors, police officers, customs officials or judges offered money, a gift or a favour to see their problems solved.

In 2006 the European Commission established goals for Bulgaria to improve its fight against corruption and organised crime. In the 2011 Corruption Perceptions Index, Bulgaria ranked 86th out of 182 countries. They scored a 3.3 with 10 the highest possible.

Corruption is viewed as an obstacle to doing business in Bulgaria. Kickbacks and bribes are a norm in the public procurement sector, a practice which decreases opportunities for foreign investors. Domestic companies sometimes face demands for payments or bribes when they register their business or try to get access to public utilities.

Bulgaria's criminal code outlaws many types of corruption, but enforcement of the laws is weak.

Bulgaria's voters voted in a parliamentary election on March 26, 2017. This was the country's third major election since 2013. According to Transparency International Bulgaria, “Bulgarian citizens are disappointed with the functioning of institutions.”

==== Vote buying ====
International election observers have repeatedly raised concerns about allegations of vote-buying and controlled voting in Bulgaria. In its report on the June 2024 parliamentary elections, the OSCE Office for Democratic Institutions and Human Rights (ODIHR) called for allegations to be addressed and for voter education in communities vulnerable to vote-buying. The report also cautioned that public debate had portrayed Roma as the source of the problem, reinforcing stereotypes, and said that some enforcement measures in Roma neighbourhoods could adversely affect participation. During the campaign for the April 2026 parliamentary election, caretaker prime minister Andrey Gurov argued that high voter turnout could make vote-buying schemes ineffective.

==== Corruption Perceptions Index ====
The Corruption Perceptions Index, published by Transparency International, scores countries on how corrupt their public sectors are viewed. Countries are ranked from 0 (highly corrupt) to 100 (very clean). Bulgaria's 2025 score was 40. Among the 176 countries scored, Bulgaria was ranked number 84 like Hungary.

The table shows Bulgaria's scores 2025, 2020, and between 2012 and 2015:

Year	Score
2025	40
2020	44
2015	41
2014	43
2013	41
2012	41

==== European Commission Bulgarian corruption benchmarks ====
In 2006 the European Commission established goals for Bulgaria to improve its fight against corruption and organised crime. These goals were based on the Treaty on European Union, the Treaty of Accession of the Republic of Bulgaria and Romania, and opinions expressed by EU member states. The Commission noted specific problematic areas in the accountability and efficiency of the judicial and law enforcement systems.

The European Commission adopted a series of specific benchmarks for Bulgaria to reach:

1. “Adopt constitutional amendments removing any ambiguity regarding the independence and accountability of the judicial system.”
2. “Ensure a more transparent and efficient judicial process by adopting and implementing a new judicial system act and the new civil procedure code. Report on the impact of these new laws and of the penal and administrative procedure codes, notably on the pre-trial phase.”
3. “Continue the reform of the judiciary in order to enhance professionalism, accountability and efficiency. Evaluate the impact of this reform and publish the results annually.”
4. “Conduct and report on professional, non-partisan investigations into allegations of high-level corruption. Report on internal inspections of public institutions and on the publication of assets of high-level officials.”
5. “Take further measures to prevent and fight corruption, in particular at the borders and within local government.”
6. “Implement a strategy to fight organised crime, focusing on serious crime, money laundering as well as on the systematic confiscation of assets of criminals. Report on new and ongoing investigations, indictments and convictions in these areas.”

==== Corporate raiding ====
Corporate raiding is the practice of illegally taking over a company via manipulation of government power. It has three main components:

1. A corrupt judiciary that fabricates (makes up) criminal charges against the victim;
2. A corrupt media that, in coordination with the government, runs a “black PR” campaign, which spreads lies about the victim's company (usually causing a panic among the company's customers);
3. Corrupt regulatory officials who use government power to seize the target's asset and distribute them to the criminals.

In 2014, Corporate Commercial Bank—the country's fourth largest bank whose financial portfolio made up ten percent of Bulgaria's GDP—was hit by a bank run after prosecutors and the media televised a raid of the bank's offices. Soon thereafter, criminal charges were filed against the bank's owner, Tzevetan Vassilev. Many officials believe the bank run was organized by a group of senior-level government officials. After the bank run, the bank collapsed, “causing a financial crisis in the country and widespread economic hardship for Bulgarian citizens.”

According to Balkan Business Wire, “Between 2013 and 2014, the country of Bulgaria saw one of its largest and most successful banks demolished by a trio of a corrupt judiciary, corrupt media, and corrupt government officials in a classic corporate raiding scheme.”

Corporate Commercial Bank's financial portfolio made up ten percent of the Bulgaria's GDP. After the corporate raiding scheme was carried out, the bank was shut down, its assets were stolen, and depositors lost their savings.

=== Organised crime ===
Bulgarian organised crime groups are involved in a wide range of activities, including drug trafficking, cigarette smuggling, human trafficking, prostitution, illicit antiquities trafficking, extortion (often under the cover of ostensible security and insurance companies) and the arms trade. They appear to have connections with the Russian Mafia, Serbian Mafia, and the Italian Cosa Nostra.

=== Human trafficking ===
Bulgaria is a source and, to a lesser extent, a transit and destination country for women and children who are subjected to trafficking in persons, specifically forced prostitution and men, women, and children subjected to conditions of forced labor.

=== Violence against women ===
Bulgaria is part of the paradox of many Eastern European societies: a long tradition of involvement of women in public working life, and high professional status for women; but at the same time leniency towards domestic violence. A 1996 report stated: "Society recognizes women's intellectual abilities. For fifty years now, women constitute half of the labour force in the country. The situation in the family is different. The relationship model is a patriarchal one."

In the 21st century, with the entry in the EU, Bulgaria has revised its policy on family violence, particularly by enacting its first domestic violence law, the 2005 Protection against Domestic Violence Act. In 2015, Bulgaria repealed Article 158 of the Penal Code, which stated that a perpetrator of several sexual offences could escape prosecution by marrying the victim.

== By location ==
=== Varna ===
The city of Varna is known to be the main hub for Bulgarian organized crime. Some sectors of the economy, including gambling, corporate security, tourism, real estate, and professional sports, are believed to be controlled in part by business groups with links to Communist-era secret services or the military; the TIM group, based in Varna, is one example.
