= Angel Solakov =

Bulgarian politician (1922–1998)

- Ангел Иванов Солаков

Minister of Interior of Bulgaria
- In office 27 December 1968 – 9 July 1971
- Preceded by: Diko Dimitrov Dikov (15.10.1910 Berkovitsa, Kingdom of Bulgaria - 14.04.1985 Sofia, People's Republic of Bulgaria)
- Succeeded by: Angel Minev Tsanev (01.11.1912 Varna, Kingdom of Bulgaria - 10.04.2003 Sofia, Republic of Bulgaria)

Personal details
- Born: 22 July 1922 Sofia, Bulgaria
- Died: 1998 (aged 75–76) Sofia, Bulgaria
- Political party: Bulgarian Communist Party

Military service
- Rank: General
- Commands: Committee for State Security

Angel Ivanov Solakov (Bulgarian: Ангел Иванов Солаков; 22 July 1922 – 1998) was a Bulgarian Communist politician and statesman who served as the Minister of Interior and chairman of the Committee for State Security.

== Biography ==
Solakov was born in Sofia and joined the Workers' Youth League at the age of 16 in 1938 and the Bulgarian Communist Party in 1942.

During the war, Solakov led communist partisan detachments against the regime. He was arrested and sentenced to 15 years in prison. Solakov was released in 1944 after the Soviet army invaded Bulgaria.

Solakov was active in the Dimitrov Communist Youth Union and was secretary of the Central Committee of the union from 1951 to 1958. After power was solidified in the hands of Todor Zhivkov, Solakov quickly rose in the hierarchy of the Bulgarian People's Republic. He was co-opted into the Central Committee of the BCP and was appointed deputy Interior Minister.

In 1965 he took an active part in the suppression of the 1965 coup d'état attempt, after which the dictator Zhivkov made him chairman of the State Security Committee, separated from the Ministry of Interior, and after the KDS was merged with the Ministry in 1968, he received the rank of minister.

In the 1971 he started to fall out of favor with the BCP leadership, particularly Zhivkov himself and subsequently he was removed from his office. One reason for the removal was Solakov's involvement in football conflicts. Solakov pointedly gave preference to FC Levski-Spartak and allegedly was involved in creating hooligan groups for the club. Another reason was Zhivkov's concern was that the Ministry of Interior was becoming too powerful under Solakov and its increasing surveillance over party officials.

Another possible reason was his conflicts with Soviet officials: as an historian, Solakov stated in such contacts that in the Russian-Turkish and World War II the Bulgarian people liberated themselves primarily on their own, while the support of the Russian Empire and the Soviet Union played a secondary role. The worst of these conflicts happened during a toast with general Semyon Tsvigun.

Solakov criticized himself, emphasized his personal loyalty to Zhivkov, and agreed to be removed from the government. Zhivkov accepted the apologies and the case ended with the removal of Angel Solakov from the ministry and the Central Committee of the Bulgarian Communist Party.

Angel Solakov became the Chairman of the Bulgarian Rowing Federation in 1963 and from 1971 to 1990 he was the Deputy Chairman of the Bulgarian Olympic Committee.
