= National Police Service (Bulgaria) =

National Police Service Национална служба „Полиция“
- Logo of the National Police
- Common name: Полиция / Police
- Abbreviation: GDNP

Agency overview
- Formed: 1925
- Preceding agency: People's Militia
- Employees: 53114 officers
- Annual budget: $1,103,492,490

Jurisdictional structure
- Operations jurisdiction: Bulgaria
- General nature: Civilian police

Operational structure
- Headquarters: Sofia, Bulgaria
- Elected officer responsible: Daniel Mitov, Minister of Interior
- Agency executive: Senior Commissioner Zahari Vaskov, Director
- Parent agency: Ministry of Interior
- Child agency: Security Police, Traffic Police, local Specialized Police Forces and other smaller agencies

Facilities
- Stations: More than 180

Website
- www.mvr.bg/gdnp

The National Police Service (Bulgarian: Национална служба „Полиция“), also known as the General Directorate "National Police" (Главна дирекция "Национална полиция", ГДНП) is an independent agency of the Ministry of the Interior responsible for general law enforcement in Bulgaria.

== History ==
=== Directorate for Police and State Security (1925–1944) ===
With the creation of the Law for Administration and Police in 1925 was established the Police and State Security Directorate.

Its duties included enforcing laws and ensuring the safety of the country. It continued to function until 1944 with the creation of the People's Militia.

=== Militia (1944–1989) ===
The People's Militia (Bulgarian: Народна милиция) was established by the Council of Ministers with Decree No. 1 on 10 September 1944 (one day after the communist coup).

The Directorate of the People's Militia was structured into two departments: State Security and People's Militia.

On April 1, 1947, the Main Directorate of the People's Militia was established, which included the Directorate of State Security and the Directorate of the People's Militia.

The militia functioned as a basic police force, but also acted as an intelligence agency and spied on both its own and foreign citizens, secretly gathering information for the communist party.

With the democratic changes of 1991, the People's Militia was replaced by the National Police.

=== General Directorate of the National Police (1991–present) ===
With the fall of communism in 1991 was established the National Police Directorate and later, in 1993 was accepted the new law for the national police.

In 2008 the national police numbered 47000 officers and 5000 administrative workers. In 2022 a total of 53114 officers and ~4000 civilian workers served under the GDNP.

== Directors ==
- Encho Staykov (September 1944)
- Radenko Vidinsky (September – November 1944)
- Rusi Hristozov (November 1944 – April 1947)
- Blagoi Penev (January 10, 1948 – April 20, 1950)
- Major General Georgi Krastev (March – October 1963)
- Colonel Petko Stoyanov (1953 – May 1954; 1957 – 1963)
- Grigor Shopov (June 18, 1963 – ?)
- Major General Georgi Krastev (? – April 1966)
- Lieutenant General Nikola Angelov (April 1966 – December 1969)
- Major General Kostadin Iliev (July 17, 1972 – October 22, 1981)
- Major General Ivan Dimitrov (October 22, 1981 – February 21, 1990)
- Colonel Hristo Velichkov (1990)
- Colonel Viktor Mihailov (1990 – December 1992)
- Major General Hristo Marinski (January 3 – February 19, 1997)
- Colonel Slavcho Bosilkov (February 19, 1997 – December 3, 1998)
- Major General Vasil Vasilev (December 3, 1998 – December 15, 2003)
- Major General Ilia Iliev (December 15, 2003 – September 21, 2005)
- Lieutenant General Valentin Petrov (September 21, 2005 – November 28, 2007)
- Chief Commissioner Veselin Petrov (November 28, 2007 – July 1, 2008)
- Chief Commissioner Krasimir Petrov (July 1, 2008 – November 25, 2013)
- Chief Commissioner Todor Grebenarov (November 25, 2013 – February 24, 2015)
- Chief Commissioner Hristo Terziyski (February 24, 2015 – July 24, 2020)
- Senior Commissioner Nikolay Hadzhiev (July 24, 2020 – June 8, 2021)
- Chief Commissioner Stanimir Stanev (June 8, 2021 – January 4, 2022)
- Senior Commissioner Atanas Ilkov (January 4, 2022 – January 7, 2022)
- Chief Commissioner Vencislav Kirchev (January 7, 2022 – August 9, 2022)
- Atanas Ilkov (since August 9, 2022 – current director of the National Police)

== Structure ==
The National Police has the following structure:

- General Directorate "National Police"
- Director
  - departments and sectors directly subordinated to the Director
  - Deputy Director
    - Criminal Police Department
    - Economic Police Department
  - Deputy Director
    - Department for Investigations
    - Department for Methodic Supervision of Investigations
    - independent sectors
  - Deputy Director
    - Public Order and Territorial Police Department – Security Police, Traffic Police
    - Specialized Police Forces

== Ranks and insignia ==
Rank group	General / flag officers			Senior officers			Junior officers
(Bulgaria) National Police Service
(Bulgaria) National Police Service	Главен секретар	Главен комисар	Старши комисар	Комисар	Главен инспектор	Старши инспектор	Инспектор I-ва степен	Инспектор II-ра степен	Инспектор III-та степен
(Bulgaria) National Police Service	Glaven sekretar	Glaven komisar	Starshi komisar	Komisar	Glaven inspektor	Starshi inspektor	Inspektor I-va stepen	Inspektor II-ra stepen	Inspektor III-ta stepen

Others

Rank group	Policemen
(Bulgaria) National Police Service
(Bulgaria) National Police Service	Главен полицай	Полицай I-ва степен	Полицай II степен	Полицай III степен
(Bulgaria) National Police Service	Glaven politsaĭ	Politsaĭ I-va stepen	Politsaĭ II stepen	Politsaĭ III stepen

== Locations ==
The National Police Service of Bulgaria operates more than 180 police stations. These facilities are organized under the jurisdiction of the Ministry of the Interior and are distributed across 28 Regional Directorates of the Ministry of Interior, which oversee policing and law enforcement operations throughout the country. 27 of the directorates are to be found named as ODMVR (Oblastna Direkciya na MVR, Regional Directorate of the Ministry of Interior), while the Directorate for Sofia is to be named SDVR (Stolichna Direkciya na Vatreshnite Raboti, Directorate of the Ministry of Interior for Stolichna Municipality).

National Police Service of Bulgaria stations and substations
Province	Directorate	Town Station	Count
Blagoevgrad Province	ODMVR Blagoevgrad	Blagoevgrad	2*
Blagoevgrad Province	ODMVR Blagoevgrad	Razlog	1
Blagoevgrad Province	ODMVR Blagoevgrad	Bansko	1
Blagoevgrad Province	ODMVR Blagoevgrad	Gotse Delchev	1
Blagoevgrad Province	ODMVR Blagoevgrad	Petrich	1
Blagoevgrad Province	ODMVR Blagoevgrad	Sandanski	1
Burgas Province	ODMVR Burgas	Burgas	4*
Burgas Province	ODMVR Burgas	Aitos	1
Burgas Province	ODMVR Burgas	Karnobat	1
Burgas Province	ODMVR Burgas	Malko Tarnovo	1
Burgas Province	ODMVR Burgas	Nessebar	1
Burgas Province	ODMVR Burgas	Primorsko	1
Burgas Province	ODMVR Burgas	Pomorie	1
Burgas Province	ODMVR Burgas	Ruen	1
Burgas Province	ODMVR Burgas	Sozopol	1
Burgas Province	ODMVR Burgas	Sredets	1
Burgas Province	ODMVR Burgas	Sungurlare	1
Burgas Province	ODMVR Burgas	Tsarevo	1
Varna Province	ODMVR Varna	Varna	5*
Varna Province	ODMVR Varna	Aksakovo	1
Varna Province	ODMVR Varna	Devnya	1
Varna Province	ODMVR Varna	Provadiya	1
Veliko Tarnovo Province	ODMVR Veliko Tarnovo	Veliko Tarnovo	1*
Veliko Tarnovo Province	ODMVR Veliko Tarnovo	Gorna Oryahovitsa	1
Veliko Tarnovo Province	ODMVR Veliko Tarnovo	Elena	1
Veliko Tarnovo Province	ODMVR Veliko Tarnovo	Pavlikeni	1
Veliko Tarnovo Province	ODMVR Veliko Tarnovo	Svishtov	1
Vidin Province	ODMVR Vidin	Vidin	3*
Vidin Province	ODMVR Vidin	Belogradchik	2
Vidin Province	ODMVR Vidin	Kula	1
Vratsa Province	ODMVR Vratsa	Vratsa	2*
Vratsa Province	ODMVR Vratsa	Mezdra	1
Vratsa Province	ODMVR Vratsa	Byala Slatina	1
Vratsa Province	ODMVR Vratsa	Kozloduyi	1
Vratsa Province	ODMVR Vratsa	Oryahovo	1
Gabrovo Province	ODMVR Gabrovo	Gabrovo	1*
Gabrovo Province	ODMVR Gabrovo	Sevlievo	1
Gabrovo Province	ODMVR Gabrovo	Dryanovo	1
Gabrovo Province	ODMVR Gabrovo	Tryavna	1
Dobrich Province	ODMVR Dobrich	Dobrich	2*
Dobrich Province	ODMVR Dobrich	Tervel	1
Dobrich Province	ODMVR Dobrich	Balchik	1
Dobrich Province	ODMVR Dobrich	General Toshevo	1
Dobrich Province	ODMVR Dobrich	Shabla	1
Dobrich Province	ODMVR Dobrich	Krushari	1
Kyustendil Province	ODMVR Kyustendil	Kyustendil	1*
Kyustendil Province	ODMVR Kyustendil	Dupnitsa	1
Kyustendil Province	ODMVR Kyustendil	Bobov Dol	1
Kyustendil Province	ODMVR Kyustendil	Rila	1
Kardzhali Province	ODMVR Kardzhali	Kardzhali	2*
Kardzhali Province	ODMVR Kardzhali	Momchilgrad	1
Kardzhali Province	ODMVR Kardzhali	Dzhebel	1
Kardzhali Province	ODMVR Kardzhali	Kirkovo	1
Kardzhali Province	ODMVR Kardzhali	Ardino	1
Kardzhali Province	ODMVR Kardzhali	Krumovgrad	1
Lovech Province	ODMVR Lovech	Lovech	1*
Lovech Province	ODMVR Lovech	Troyan	1
Lovech Province	ODMVR Lovech	Teteven	1
Lovech Province	ODMVR Lovech	Lukovit	1
Lovech Province	ODMVR Lovech	Ugarchin	1
Lovech Province	ODMVR Lovech	Yablanitsa	1
Montana Province	ODMVR Montana	Montana	1*
Montana Province	ODMVR Montana	Lom	1
Montana Province	ODMVR Montana	Berkovitsa	1
Pazardzhik Province	ODMVR Pazardzhik	Pazardzhik	1*
Pazardzhik Province	ODMVR Pazardzhik	Velingrad	1
Pazardzhik Province	ODMVR Pazardzhik	Panagyurishte	1
Pazardzhik Province	ODMVR Pazardzhik	Peshtera	1
Pazardzhik Province	ODMVR Pazardzhik	Septemvri	1
Pernik Province	ODMVR Pernik	Pernik	2*
Pernik Province	ODMVR Pernik	Radomir	1
Pernik Province	ODMVR Pernik	Breznik	1
Pernik Province	ODMVR Pernik	Tran	1
Pleven Province	ODMVR Pleven	Pleven	2*
Pleven Province	ODMVR Pleven	Cherven Bryag	1
Pleven Province	ODMVR Pleven	Levski	1
Pleven Province	ODMVR Pleven	Nikopol	1
Pleven Province	ODMVR Pleven	Dolni Dubnik	1
Pleven Province	ODMVR Pleven	Dolna Mitropolia	1
Pleven Province	ODMVR Pleven	Knezha	1
Plovdiv Province	ODMVR Plovdiv	Plovdiv	6*
Plovdiv Province	ODMVR Plovdiv	Asenovgrad	1
Plovdiv Province	ODMVR Plovdiv	Karlovo	1
Plovdiv Province	ODMVR Plovdiv	Hisar	1
Plovdiv Province	ODMVR Plovdiv	Stamboliiski	1
Plovdiv Province	ODMVR Plovdiv	Rakovski	1
Plovdiv Province	ODMVR Plovdiv	Parvomai	1
Plovdiv Province	ODMVR Plovdiv	Trud	1
Razgrad Province	ODMVR Razgrad	Razgrad	1*
Razgrad Province	ODMVR Razgrad	Isperih	1
Razgrad Province	ODMVR Razgrad	Kubrat	1
Ruse Province	ODMVR Ruse	Ruse	2*
Ruse Province	ODMVR Ruse	Byala	1
Ruse Province	ODMVR Ruse	Betovo	1
Ruse Province	ODMVR Ruse	Dve Mogili	1
Ruse Province	ODMVR Ruse	Slivo Pole	1
Silistra Province	ODMVR Silistra	Silistra	1*
Silistra Province	ODMVR Silistra	Tutrakan	1
Silistra Province	ODMVR Silistra	Dulovo	1
Sliven Province	ODMVR Sliven	Sliven	1*
Sliven Province	ODMVR Sliven	Nova Zagora	1
Sliven Province	ODMVR Sliven	Kotel	1
Sliven Province	ODMVR Sliven	Tvarditsa	1
Smolyan Province	ODMVR Smolyan	Smolyan	1*
Smolyan Province	ODMVR Smolyan	Chepelare	1
Smolyan Province	ODMVR Smolyan	Devin	1
Smolyan Province	ODMVR Smolyan	Madan	1
Smolyan Province	ODMVR Smolyan	Zlatograd	1
Sofia City Province	SDVR	Sofia	9*
Sofia Province	ODMVR Sofia	Botevgrad	1
Sofia Province	ODMVR Sofia	Elin Pelin	1
Sofia Province	ODMVR Sofia	Etropole	1
Sofia Province	ODMVR Sofia	Ihtiman	1
Sofia Province	ODMVR Sofia	Kostenets	1
Sofia Province	ODMVR Sofia	Kostinbrod	1
Sofia Province	ODMVR Sofia	Pirdop	1
Sofia Province	ODMVR Sofia	Pravets	1
Sofia Province	ODMVR Sofia	Samokov	1
Sofia Province	ODMVR Sofia	Svoge	1
Sofia Province	ODMVR Sofia	Slivnitsa	1
Stara Zagora Province	ODMVR Stara Zagora	Stara Zagora	2*
Stara Zagora Province	ODMVR Stara Zagora	Kazanlak	1
Stara Zagora Province	ODMVR Stara Zagora	Chirpan	1
Stara Zagora Province	ODMVR Stara Zagora	Galabovo	1
Stara Zagora Province	ODMVR Stara Zagora	Radnevo	1
Targovishte Province	ODMVR Targovishte	Targovishte	1*
Targovishte Province	ODMVR Targovishte	Popovo	1
Targovishte Province	ODMVR Targovishte	Omurtag	1
Haskovo Province	ODMVR Haskovo	Haskovo	1*
Haskovo Province	ODMVR Haskovo	Dimitrovgrad	1
Haskovo Province	ODMVR Haskovo	Svilengrad	1
Haskovo Province	ODMVR Haskovo	Harmanli	1
Haskovo Province	ODMVR Haskovo	Topolovgrad	1
Haskovo Province	ODMVR Haskovo	Ivailovgrad	1
Shumen Province	ODMVR Shumen	Shumen	1*
Shumen Province	ODMVR Shumen	Veliki Preslav	1
Shumen Province	ODMVR Shumen	Novi Pazar	1
Shumen Province	ODMVR Shumen	Kaolinovo	1
Yambol Province	ODMVR Yambol	Yambol	1*
Yambol Province	ODMVR Yambol	Tundzha	1
Yambol Province	ODMVR Yambol	Straldzha	1
Yambol Province	ODMVR Yambol	Elhovo	1

* denotes Regional Police Stations, which is higher in the hierarchy. Plain numbers denote Police Stations.

== Inventory ==
=== Small arms ===
Name	Origin	Type	Notes
Makarov	Bulgaria	Semi-automatic pistol	Locally produced at the Arsenal plant in Kazanlak. Most popular pistol in the Bulgarian Police.
Walther PDP	Germany	Semi-automatic pistol	Bought in bulk since 2020. Second most popular handgun, though mostly used in the bigger cities and by higher ranked police in the countryside.
Glock 17	Austria	Semi-automatic pistol	Used by ГДБОП and СОБТ they are used for years and still using them

=== Submachine gun ===
Name	Origin	Type	Notes
Brügger & Thomet MP9	Switzerland	Submachine gun	Used by СДВР (Столична дирекция на вътрешните работи)
Heckler & Koch MP5	Germany	Submachine gun	Used by СДВР,ГДБОП,СОБТ

=== Vehicles ===
The vehicle fleet of the National Police Service construes of a wide variety of different models. The police cars of Bulgaria could be both marked and unmarked. The marked police cars could be colored in the older Bulgarian police livery, which is a white-painted body with two blue stripes, Police written in Bulgarian along with the National Police Service's logo. Some vehicles are featuring a slight variation of this livery, being colored in either red, or dark blue. Recently, a newer livery was introduced, featuring a color scheme with a white-blue livery and prominent neon yellow reflective stripes for high visibility in an effort to unify the color palette of the marked police cars and make it consistent with the style used in various other European countries.

National Police Service of Bulgaria's vehicles
Make	Model	Details	Photo	Note
Skoda	Kodiaq			New livery.
Volkswagen	Golf	Variant		New livery.
Volvo	XC60	PHEV		New livery.
BMW	3 Series	330d Touring		New livery. Mostly used as Highway Police
Ford	Tourneo			New livery.
Kia	Ceed			Usually featuring the old livery.
Skoda	Rapid			Usually featuring the old livery.
Volkswagen	Tiguan			Featuring armored elements; usually using the old livery.
SsangYong	Tivoli			Used mostly as Municipal Police in Sofia. Could be seen in both the new livery, but also in the traditional Bulgarian police-car colors.
Great Wall	H6			Old livery.
Opel	Astra	1.6 Classic		This is the longest-standing horse of the Bulgarian National Police Service. Used for many years; featuring the old livery, and could also be seen in red and blue. After many years of faithful service, fewer and fewer Opel Astras are to be spotted patrolling.
Citroen	Xsara	Picasso		Old livery. In the past it was also heavily used by the Bulgarian Border Police.
Ford	Ranger	Pick-up (with a hard top)		Old livery.
Ford	Transit			Old livery - Featuring armored elements.
Volkswagen	T5		VW Police 2026	Old livery.

Motorbikes

== See also ==
- Ministry of Justice
- Law enforcement in Bulgaria
