= Anton Kuzmanov =

Bulgarian footballer (born 1918)

Personal information
- Full name: Anton Kuzmanov
- Date of birth: 28 March 1918
- Place of birth: Bulgaria
- Position: Defender

Senior career*
Years	Team	Apps	(Gls)
1938–1939	Shipka Sofia		
1939–1941	Jedinstvo Belgrade		

International career
1938	Bulgaria	1	(0)
- * Club domestic league appearances and goals

Anton "Donyo" Kuzmanov (Bulgarian: Антон Кузманов 'Доньо', born 28 March 1918) was a Bulgarian footballer.

== Club career ==
Donyo Kuzmanov played in a prestigious Bulgarian club FC Shipka Sofia reaching with them the third place in the 1937–38 Bulgarian championship. After winning the 1939 Bulgarian Cup Final he moved to Yugoslavia and joined Serbian club SK Jedinstvo Beograd. He was registered for Jedinstvo in November 1939. He was coached by Bane Sekulić. He also played with Jedinstvo in the 1940–41 Serbian League scoring one goal.

== International career ==
On 2 October 1938, in Sofia, he played for the Bulgaria national team in a friendly match against Germany.
