= National Investigative Service (Bulgaria) =

National Investigative Service Национална следствена служба

Agency overview
- Formed: 2002

Jurisdictional structure
- Operations jurisdiction: Bulgaria

Operational structure
- Headquarters: Sofia 1797, G. M. Dimitrov Street 42
- Agency executives: Borislav Sarafov, Director; Yuliana Katsarova-Chorbadzhieva, Deputy Director; Ivelina Hristova, Director

Website
- www.nsls.justice.bg

The National Investigative Service (Bulgarian: Национална следствена служба) is the national investigation agency of Bulgaria for serious crimes and cooperation in international investigations. It was established in 2002, replacing the Specialized Investigation Service, which was founded in 1998. The National Investigative Service is currently headed by Borislav Sarafov, a former head of the Specialized Prosecutor's Offices of Appeals.

== Director of the service ==
The director of the Service is appointed by the Supreme Judicial Council for a five-year term with the possibility of being selected again. He is the deputy of the Prosecutor General of Bulgaria in investigations by law.

The director is also deputy chief prosecutor.
