= TIM (Bulgaria) =

Organized crime syndicate

- Type: Holding company
- Founded: 1990s
- Founders: Tihomir Mitev, Ivo Kamenov, Marin Mitev
- Headquarters: Varna, Bulgaria
- Key people: Tihomir Mitev, Ivo Kamenov, Marin Mitev

TIM
- Territory: Bulgaria
- Membership: 3 bosses, hundreds members and associates
- Activities: smuggling, control of prostitution, drug trafficking, gambling, car theft

TIM is an organized crime syndicate incorporated as a holding company based in Varna, Bulgaria. The company is controlled by three veterans of an elite communist-era military unit: Tihomir Mitev, Ivo Kamenov, and Marin Mitev. The abbreviation TIM stands for the first letters of each of the owners' first names.

According to a leaked diplomatic cable, TIM has been engaged in organized criminal activities. As chronicled by German journalist Jan Puhl in an article for Der Spiegel, TIM started out as a private security firm in 1990s, whose starting capital was acquired through smuggling, prostitution, gambling, car theft, and drug trafficking. Subsequently, TIM invested its money in various legal ventures and grew into a holding company employing over 30,000 people, making it the largest and most influential employer in Varna.

== Notes ==
- Betty Ganeva: Pik-Dame und ihre erste private Stadt. Bulgarisches Wirtschaftsblatt, 2012-12-3
- Bulgarian who set himself on fire new symbol of protests. Agence France-Presse, 2013-3-5
