= Nikola Nedev =

Bulgarian Major general, politician and military historian

General Nikola Nedev
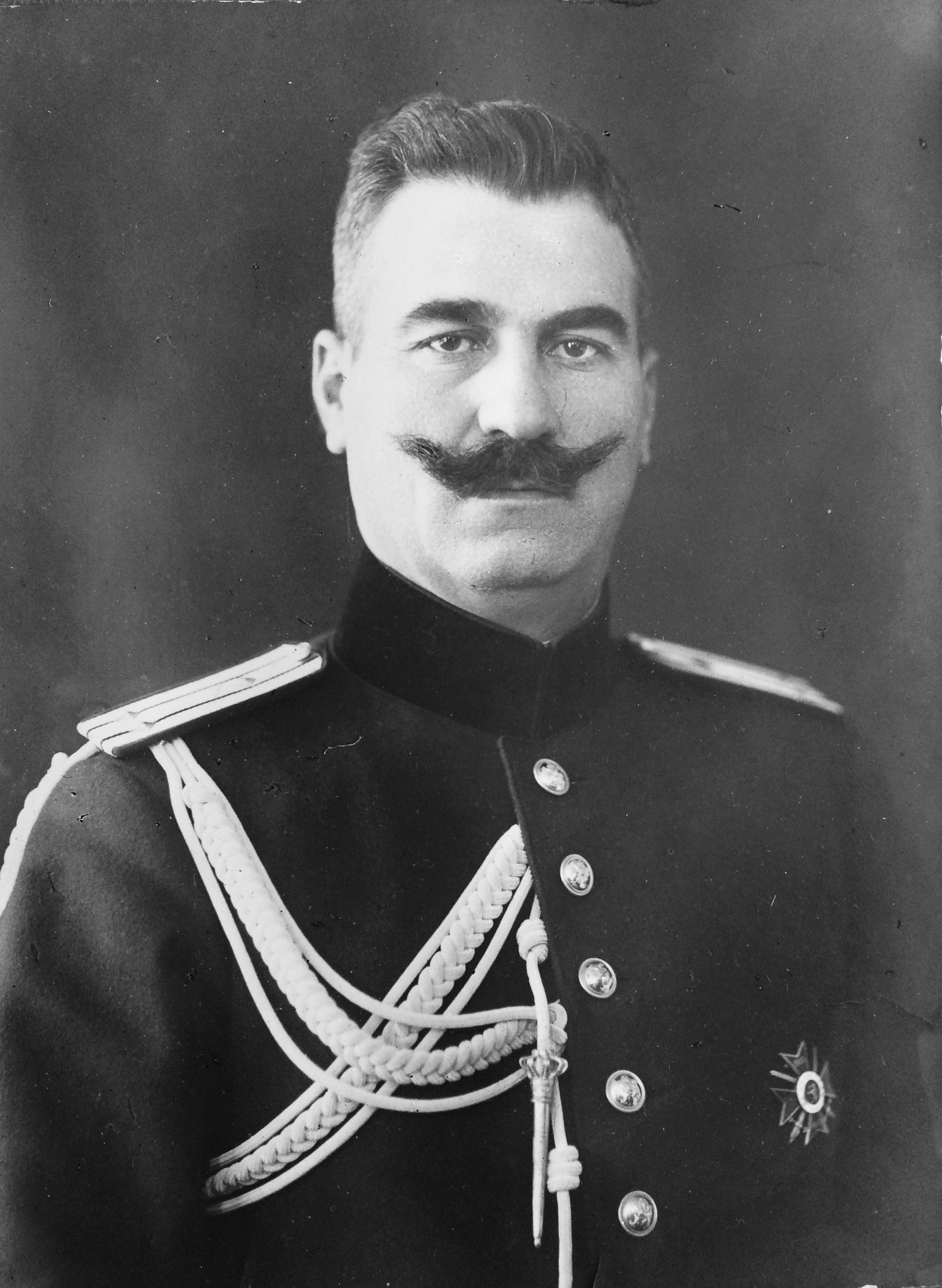
- Bulgarian military officer and politician
- Born: 7 July 1886
- Died: 27 April 1970 (aged 83); Sofia
- Military career
- Service years: Chairman of the Military History Commission; chairman of the cycling Union (1936) 14 November 1938 – 23 October 1939 – Minister of the Interior affairs and public Health in the cabinet of Georgi Kyoseivanov /the 3rd cabinet/ 23 October 1939 – 15 October 1940 – Minister of the Interior affairs and public Health in the cabinet of Georgi Kyoseivanov /the 4th cabinet/
- Rank: Lieutenant /04.09.1910/ Captain /01.11.1913/ Major /01.01.1918/ Lieutenant Colonel /30.01.1923/ Colonel /26.03.1928/ Major General /06.06.1935/
- Awards: Erinnerungskreuz für die Unabhängigkeit Bulgariens (1910) Order of Bravery IV grade, 1st class (1917); Order of Military Merit, II grade Order of St Alexander Iron Cross, II class (1917/)

Nikola Dimitrov Nedev (July 7, 1886 – April 27, 1970) was a Bulgarian Major general, politician and military historian. He was the Minister of Interior affairs and Public Health in the third and fourth cabinets of Georgi Kyoseivanov (November 1938 to February 1940).

His first cousins were Lieutenant General Nikola Mihov and Major General Ivan Ivanov – descendants of the great Mollov's family. Nedev was a friend of Petar Danov (also known by the name Beinsa Douno, and often called Master by his followers) who was a Bulgarian philosopher and spiritual teacher of the Universal White Brotherhood. Nedev was a follower of the Danov's teachings.

== Biography ==
=== Early years ===
Nikola Nedev was born on 7 July 1886 (20 July 1886 – new style) in Veliko Tarnovo, Bulgaria into a family of intellectuals. After graduating from high school, he continued his education at the Higher Military School.

=== Career ===
On 15 August 1907 Cadet Nedev graduated with excellence from the artillery class of the Higher Military School. As Second Lieutenant he began his career as platoon commander of the 5th artillery regiment in Shoumen, and on 1 January 1908, Second Lieutenant Nedev was promoted to platoon commander of the Sofia Fortress Battalion.

During his career as an officer, Nikola Nedev was promoted to the following ranks: Lieutenant, 4 September 1910, Captain 1 November 1913, Major 1 January 1918, Lieutenant Colonel 30 January 1923, Colonel 26 March 1928, and Major General 6 June 1935. In 1936 he retired from the army.

In 1911 Nedev was awarded an excellent mark in the entrance exam at the Higher Military Academy Еcole de guerre in Brussels, Belgium. During that time he served in the artillery arsenal and the coastguard. The same year, he married Tzvetanka Grozdanova (1892–1984). They had two children—daughter Rousska Nedev Koutzouglou (1915–2010), and son Dimitar Nedev (1916–1980).

==== Participation in the Balkan War ====
The war began after the controversy between the allied Balkan countries Bulgaria, Serbia, Montenegro, Greece and the Ottoman Empire could not be resolved by political and diplomatic means. From 17 September 1912, the Bulgarian army mobilized about 600,000 people and 700 guns. The mobilized army of Serbia, Montenegro and Greece totaled 295,000 people and 648 guns. Many artists, sculptors, writers and actors joined the Bulgarian army as volunteers. Part of it was merged with 14,760 troops from Macedonia and Eastern Thrace.

The Balkan war began on 5 October 1912. Captain Nedev was the commander of the 3rd battery of slight siege department of the Sofia fortress battalion. This artillery regiment was part of the Second Bulgarian Army, which besieged Edirne fortress whose defender was the "Feric" (Iron) Mehmed Shukri Pasha.

The commanders of the Second Bulgarian Army– Lieutenant General Nikola Ivanov, Major General George Vazov, Colonel Nikola Zhekov, Major Ivan Valkov, and the commander of the First Bulgarian Army Lieutenant General Basil Koutinchev, considered that an open assault against Edirne would be the successful tactic. The chief commanders, General Mihail Savov, General Ivan Fichev, and General Radko Dimitriev, believed the town would be forced to surrender from the effects of the resulting famine. The Bulgarian and Serbian army, commanded by Major General Vladimir Vazov, carried out this tactic between 11 and 13 March 1913. Colonel Nedev was General Vazov's adjutant. The tacti was successful and on 13 March 1913 the Edirne fortress capitulated; Shukri Pasha was imprisoned. This was one of the happy and unique moment for Nikola Nedev and the Bulgarian soldiers during the Balkan war. There were many articles in the world press about the success of the Bulgarian army, and especially its military tactics.

==== To Brussels and back ====
After the war Nedev returned to Brussels to continue his education. When the Great War began, he returned to Bulgaria and was chosen to be the battery commander in the Shumen fortress battalion. In the spring of 1915 he was appointed as vice chairman of the new Military Historical Commission to the Staff of the Army.

==== The First World War ====
World War I began in 1914 between the Entente (France, Great Britain, Russian Empire, Serbia), and the Triple Alliance (Germany, Austro-Hungary, Ottoman Empire) and from 14 October 1915, Bulgaria. The war ended on 11 November 1918 with the capitulation of the Triple Alliance. On 23 September 1915 the mobilization in Bulgaria began. On 14 October 1915 Bulgaria declared war against Serbia. Bulgaria kept fighting with the French and English army in Macedonia throughout the entire war. The war between Bulgaria and the Romanian Kingdom and her ally the Russian Empire began on 1 September 1916. Bulgaria surrendered on 29 September 1918. The Neuilly Peace Treaty was signed on 27 November 1919, and ratified on 9 August 1920. 105,000 Bulgarian soldiers were killed, 150,000 were wounded, and 60,000 were disabled. Financial and physical losses amounted to 7 billion leva, economic losses and debts equaled 100 billion leva.

In September 1915 Captain Nedev was appointed procurement officer on the staff of the 8th Division in Stara Zagora. During the war he served at the division's headquarters. In the battles for Tutrakan he was the battery commander. In July 1916 he was the commander of the new howitzer battery, part of the 2nd heavy artillery regiment, fighting in Dobrudja. In 1917 Captain Nedev was the operational head of section to the staff of the army. As adjutant in the 9th Pleven's infantry division he fought at the military positions for Dojran until the end of the war in 1918.

==== After the First World War ====
On 16 June 1919 Major Nedev was appointed as vice-chairman of the historical department to the staff of the army. This post was very close to his calling; at this point he collected the historical material for the books he would later write.

At the beginning of 1920 Nedev was the cabinet's delegated military representative to the Occupying Commission in Bulgaria. Its task was to control the provisions of the Neuilly Peace Treaty, defining the territory, borders, reparations, and demilitarization. The government chose Nedev for his reputation as a truly loyal, brave, military patriot, fluent French, Italian and German. Thanks to his tact and diplomatic skills, and granted favorable conditions, he managed to negotiate a small territorial benefit; the southern border was moved a few kilometers into Greece's territory.

In 1922 Nedev along with those who had not graduated from the Higher Military Schools in Saint Petersburg defended his doctoral thesis and was declared graduated from the Ecole de guerre. In the same year he was appointed to the headquarters of the army and lectured on military history in the Sofia Military School.

Between 25 August 1923 and 13 September 1924 Lieutenant Colonel Nedev was the commander of the 18th Infantry Battalion in Veliko Tarnovo. In September 1924 he was commander of the tactical training on the staff of the 1st Infantry Battalion in Sofia. and in 1927 he became chief of staff.

From 1925 until 1928 Lieutenant Colonel Nedev was the head of the Military Intelligence in Bulgaria.

==== Literary activity ====
While defending Dojran, Nedev came up with the idea to record the bravery of the Bulgarian soldiers of Pleven's regiment. In 1921 he wrote the book The Dojran epic – 1915–1918. It tells of the victory of Plevan's 9th infantry division, commanded by Major General Vladimir Vazov. The army fought on the southern front from 1915 to 1918 against French, English, Serbian, Russian and Greek soldiers. The book presents a number of battles, including that of 16 June 1917 between the 9th Pleven's infantry division and the 22nd, 26th, and 30th English divisions. The English army advanced with 160 cannons, 11 mortars and 440 guns. Over the course of four days the British fired over 100,000 shells, but the results on their side were disappointing, keeping them from further advancement. The Bulgarian offence was so effective that the enemy's army suffered heavy casualties.

In 1927 Nedev published his second book Bulgaria in the World War – 1915–1918 a historical review, dedicated to "those who would continue the deeds of the whole Bulgarian nation". It book was reissued in 2001. In 1928 Nedev published the book The Liberation of Sofia a review of this unusual military operation in the winter of 1877.

In 1929 Nedev published his fourth book The Wars of Liberation – 1877–1878, 1885, 1912–1913, 1915–1918, where he wrote a thorough review of the wars of the third Bulgarian Kingdom.

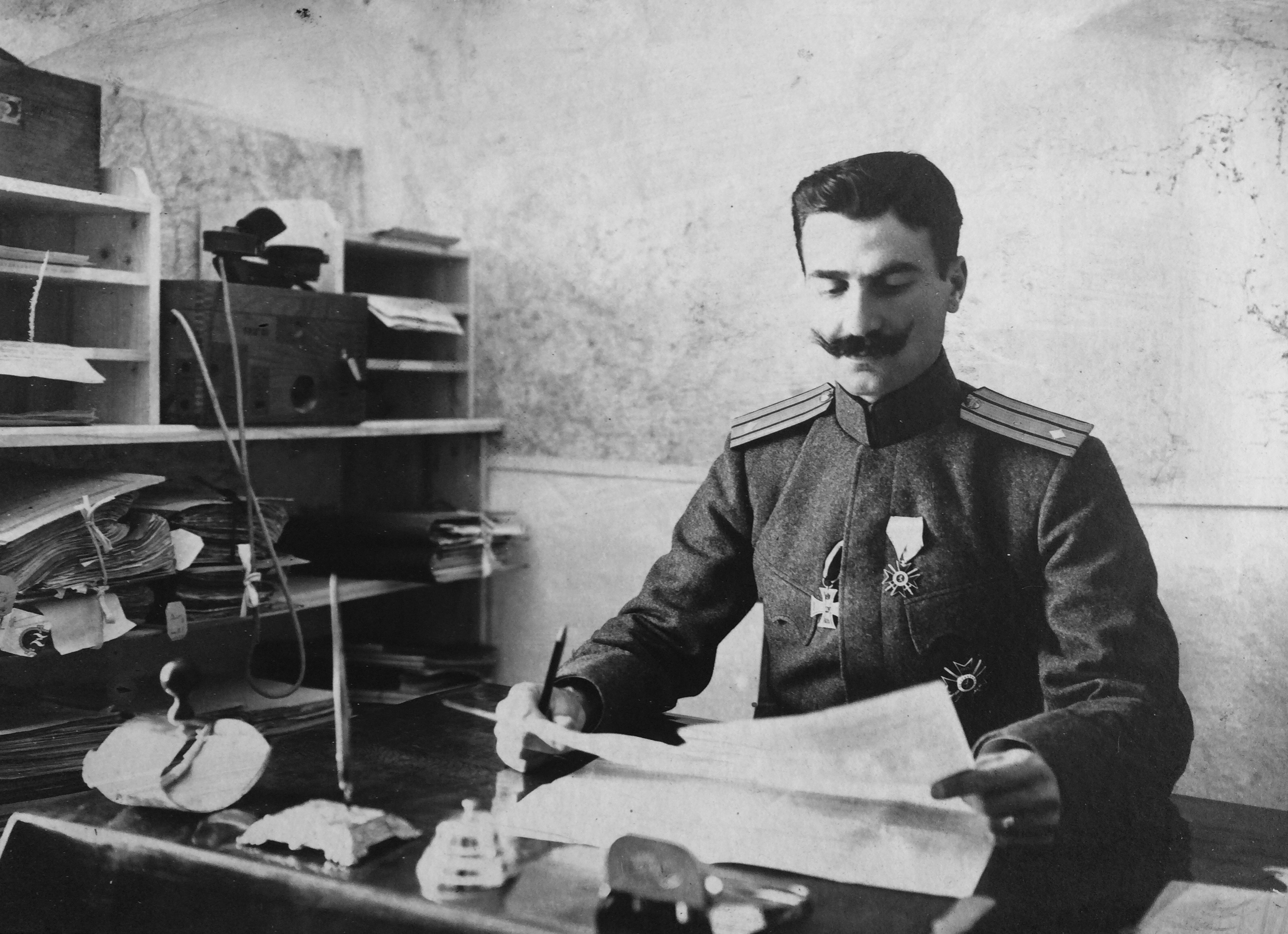

==== Military attache in Rome, Ankara and Athens ====
In 1930, Nedev was commander of the Juncer battalion of the Higher Military School. The same year he was nominated as military attache in Rome, Ankara and Athens (the headquarters were in Rome). He discovered that the Ottoman Empire had sold its barred record. Nedev knew that it contained very important documents about Bulgaria's history. This archive was bought by the Bulgarian government following Nedev's advice. Thus Levsky's case (the most celebrated national hero) was brought back to Bulgaria.

After his return from Rome in 1932 Nikola Nedev was appointed commander of the 14th Macedonian Infantry Regiment in Gorna Dzhumaya. In 1934 he was commander of the 8th Infantry Division in Stara Zagora. There, on 6 May 1936, he was promoted to the rank of major general. At the time in the 12th Infantry Regiment in Stara Zagora, forty young soldiers were accused of communist activity. The Judge Advocate demanded that they be sentenced to death. Nedev stood by his men and said that he as general, would die with his soldiers, showing the world that people could be sentenced to death for their beliefs. The punishment was cancelled.

At the end of 1935 General Nedev was commander of Pleven's Garrison. He also led the 4th Military engineering group in Pleven. At the end of 1936 he retired from the army. He was appointed chairman of the Military History Commission, as well as chairman of the cycling Union. At this point he had a chance to collect documents for his future books.

==== Minister in Kyoseivanov's cabinets ====
From 14 November 1938 Nedev was Minister of Interior Affairs and Public Health in the cabinet of Georgi Kyoseivanov. He held this office from 23 October 1939 until 15 October 1940.

In November 1936, Germany, Italy and Japan signed a treaty agreeing to a common foreign policy. On 11 March 1938 Germany occupied Austria. On 30 September 1939 Germany occupied the Sudetenland, and six months later she invaded Czechoslovakia. In 1939 Italy occupied Albania. On 23 August the Ribentrop-Molotov Treaty was signed. Poland was divided between Germany and the USSR, and on 1 September WWII began. Bulgarian society was divided in two parts; those supporting Great Britain, France and USA, and those supporting Germany, Italy and Japan. The cabinet of Georgi Kyoseivanov remained neutral until 15 September. On 31 July 1938 Bulgaria signed the Balkan Pact – its neighbors gave up the military restrictions of the Neuilly Treaty. Tsar Boris III disbanded Parliament.

At Hitler's insistence, Bulgaria began its genocide of Jews in 1939. Nedev twice requested an audience with Tsar Boris III and insisted that no Jewish men who risked their lives for Bulgaria's freedom be sentenced to death. Thanks to his efforts a sailing vessel transporting Jews was not sunk in the Black sea.

Nikola Nedev was procurator of the Takvorian Tobacco Company for a year from 1 July 1941.

==== After World War II ====
After World War II, the new political forces in Bulgaria determined Major General Nikola Nedev to be a patriot and a humanist who typified the feats of the Bulgarian army. Despite that assessment, the communist government arrested him in 1951. His family was not informed of his whereabouts for four months. Nedev was held in a concentration camp along with the members of Bulgaria's intelligencia – politicians, senior members of the military, ministers, and intellectuals. In 1954 he was released after three years of hard labor and deprived of his title and pension. Nedev kept his dignity; he thanked God he was alive, and forgave the communists "as they did not know what they had been doing".

== Awards ==
– Erinnerungskreuz für die Unabhängigkeit Bulgariens – 1910

– Order of Bravery IV grade, 1st Class – 1917

– Order of Military Merit, II Grade

– Order of St Alexander

– Iron Cross, II Class – 1917

== Writings ==
– 1921 – The Dojran epic – 1915–1918

– 1927 – Bulgaria in the World War – 1915–1918

– 1928 – The Liberation of Sofia

– 1929 – The Wars of Liberation – 1877–1878, 1885, 1912–1913, 1915–1918

== Sources ==
- Private archive of Nikola Nedev, Veliko Tarnovo
- Memoir by Rousska Nikolova Nedeva-Koutzouglou – daughter of Nikola Nedev
- Prof., Dr. Dimitar Kolev, memoir
- Archives of the Ministry of Interior Affairs
