= SOBT =

Military unit

Specialized Counter Terrorism Unit
- Специализиран отряд за борба с тероризма (Bulgarian)
- Active: 14 December 1978 - present
- Country: Bulgaria
- Agency: Ministry of Interior
- Type: Police tactical unit
- Operations jurisdiction: National
- Part of: Main Directorate of Gendarmerie, Special Operations and Counter-Terror (Главна дирекция Жандармерия, специални операции и борба с тероризма}
- Abbreviation: SOBT

Structure
- Officers: 152

Commanders
- Notable commanders: Lt. Vasil Velkov

The Directorate "Special Operations and Counter Terrorism" (Bulgarian: Специални Операции и Борба с Тероризма) is the tier one police tactical unit of the Ministry of Internal Affairs of Bulgaria (MVR).

== History ==
After the Bulgarian Communist Party (BKP) came to power on September 9, 1944, one of its first acts was to form a new law enforcement agency (LEA) - the People's Militia (Bulgarian: Народна милиция).

Terrorism was understood to be acts of industrial sabotage and ideological subversion by small groups organized and infiltrated by the countries of the capitalist world - the Socialist Bloc's main adversary during the Cold War.

As such, the main counterterrorism and hostage rescue force of the People's Republic of Bulgaria was the Internal Troops of the Ministry of the Interior. They were organized similarly to the Soviet Union's Interior Troops as a light infantry military force.

As such, they were deemed inadequate to provide the Ministry of the Interior with the rapid and flexible response needed to counter the highly trained terror organizations that emerged in the global terror wave of the 1970s.

=== SOMP era ===
The Minister of the Interior at that time Colonel General Dimitar Stoyanov issued an order on December 14, 1978, for the formation of a Specialized Operational Militia Unit, which is the forerunner of the SOBT.

The unit was based in Sofia and was subordinated to the regional Sofia City Headquarters of the People's Militia (the police department of the capitol).

The SOMP was organized into 3 assault companies, a signals platoon, and a support group (combining combat and combat service support specialists such as snipers, sappers, martial arts instructors, paratroopers, repair technicians, etc.).

=== SPBT era ===
In May 1986 the unit was reorganized. The name was changed from SOMP to the SUCT (Specialized Unit for Combating Terrorism).

It was also taken out of the regional militia department of Sofia and subordinated to the Department "Terror", 6th Directorate of the Committee for State Security. The internal structure was also overhauled.

The previous 3 assault companies, 1 signals platoon, and 1 support group were reshuffled into 4 identical operational combat detachments. Each detachment was made up of 3 sections and each section was made up of 12 operatives.

This new internal organization enabled the continuous readiness of the unit. Under the new operational regimen, the detachments rotated in 24-hour shifts. A stand-by shift was followed by 48 hours of rest and recuperation and a training shift of 24 hours after which the detachment went into a 24-hour stand-by shift and so on.

After the Communist regime came down, the Committee for State Security was disbanded and its directorates became separate services for intelligence, counterintelligence, combating organized crime, and close protection service for the state officials, etc. The unit was placed directly under the subordination of the Minister of the Interior.

== Duties ==
Its main task is to react against critical acts of terrorism, conduct hostage rescues, and apprehend high-value targets.

== Name changes ==
Era	English full name	Bulgarian full name	English abbreviation	Bulgarian abbreviation
1978 - 1986	Specialized Operational Militia Unit	Специално оперативно милиционерско поделение	SOMP	СОМП
1986 - 2003	Specialized Unit for Combating Terrorism	Специално поделение за борба с тероризма	SUCT	SPBT
2003 - 2020	Specialized Counter Terrorism Unit	Специализиран отряд за борба с тероризма	SCTU	СОБТ
2020 - present	Special Operations and Counter Terrorism	Специални Операции и Борба с Тероризма	SOCT	СОБТ

== Structure ==
- Headquarters
- Office
- Planning Group
- Logistics Department
  - Transportation and vehicles
  - Communication
  - Armory
  - Economic base
- Operations and Missions Department
  - Headquarters
  - Defence and tactical security
  - 4 Commando groups/ Sectors 01-04
    - Group leader
    - 3 Teams
  - Sector "Training and Education"
    - Fitness and martial arts
    - Group "Combat and Para"
    - Group "Tactical Training"
    - Group "Strategic Training"
    - Group "Pyrotechnics and Demolitions"

== Training and selection ==
When there are vacant slots within SOBT, or new roles must be filled, the MVR releases dates for a selection exam on its official website.

This examination lasts 2 days, during which volunteers are expected to demonstrate an adequate level of physical conditioning and undergo a brief psychological test in the form of a one hour interview.

There is no requirement for previous experience with firearms.

After successfully passing selection, fresh units undergo heavy training for about 6 months. That is usually enough time for the men to go through all of the training to be assigned to a unit and be ready for deployment.

The entry examination is not overly selective with the goal of having the 6 month training period act as the main filter.

Naturally, daily rigorous training and exercises continue even after these 6 months. To be a team leader requires extensive training that could mean at least one more year of training though some train for three additional years.

After around a year of being in the unit, operators can be selected for a more specific role, such as bomb disposal, CBRN defense, communications, executive protection, field intelligence gathering, irregular warfare, parachuting, sniper, tactical diving, tactical emergency medical, underwater demolition, etc.

The selection for these roles is done by the SOBT instructors and current manpower needs.

The SOBT has conducted training exercises with respected foreign police tactical unit and special forces teams, such as the French RAID.

Around the year 2016, SOBT appears to have collaborated with a US special forces Liaison element, during which both equipment and new, extensive tactical knowledge was acquired by SOBT.

According to an interview with a lead SOBT instructor, the positive results of this collaboration were clear in the 2018 ATLAS exercise.

== Inventory ==
=== Armor ===
The SOBT uses armored vehicles to get around and a body armor superior in ballistic characteristics to the standard Kevlar Vest. They also use other heat and fire-resistant clothing as well as various weather-proof clothes.

=== Small arms ===
Model	Origin	Type	Caliber
Glock 17	Austria	Semi-automatic pistol	9×19mm
Arsenal Shipka	Bulgaria	Submachine gun	9×18mm Makarov; 9×19mm Parabellum
Heckler & Koch MP5	Germany	Submachine gun	9×19mm
Mossberg 590	United States	Shotgun	12 gauge
AR-M1	Bulgaria	Assault rifle	5.56×45mm NATO
AR-M4SF	Bulgaria	Assault rifle	5.56×45mm; 7.62×39mm
AKS-74U	Bulgaria	Assault rifle	5.45×39mm
PWS MK114	United States	Assault rifle	.223 Remington

=== Vehicles ===
Model	Origin	Type	Notes	References
IAG Guardian	BulgariaUnited Arab Emirates	MRAP		
Plasan Sand Cat	Israel	MRAP		
ZIL-131	Soviet Union	Utility vehicle		
Volkswagen Transporter	Germany	Utility vehicle	Unmarked	
Mercedes-Benz Vito	Germany	Utility vehicle	Unmarked	
Mercedes-Benz Sprinter	Germany	Utility vehicle	Unmarked	
Mi-2	Soviet Union	Helicopter		
Mi-8	Soviet Union	Helicopter		

== Known operations ==
=== SOMP era ===
Shortly after the formation of the unit, it was deployed on May 24, 1981, when a Turkish McDonnell Douglas DC-9 airliner on a regular flight from Ankara to Istanbul was hijacked by four Turkish nationals and forced to land at the Burgas Airport. In the combined assault mounted by Bulgarian and Turkish commandos, one hijacker was shot dead and the other three were arrested with no casualties among the hostages.

On March 7, 1983, four Bulgarian nationals hijacked a Balkan Bulgarian Airlines Antonov An-24 on a scheduled flight from Sofia to Varna and demanded for the airplane to be diverted to Vienna. The Bulgarian authorities ordered the pilots to fly to Varna while assuring the hijackers that their demands were met and they were en route to the Austrian capital. In the meantime, a Yakovlev Yak-40 business jet with an assault group of the SOMP took off from Sofia and overtook the An-24 landing at the final destination ahead of it. As the flight took place at night, the local police authorities shut down the electricity in the city during the approach of the hijacked airplane to make it harder for the terrorists on board to spot the Black Sea - a highly observable indicator that this was not Vienna. In the subsequent assault, the hijackers were apprehended and the hostages were freed unharmed.

On October 3, 1986, the SOMP joined the list of the few counterterrorism and hostage rescue units worldwide that successfully executed operations abroad. A group of 86 Iranians, including women and children (still more than half of them are well-built men of military age), fled the general mobilization for the Iran–Iraq War. They first arrived in Turkey, where they contracted a local travel agency to organize a vacation to East Berlin, chartering a Balkan Bulgarian Airlines Tupolev Tu-154 from Burgas Airport. They planned to flee to West Berlin, seeking political asylum. When they arrived at Berlin Schönefeld Airport, however their plan was thwarted as the West Berlin authorities refused to admit them on their territory without proper visas. The East German border control officials at the airport collected their passports and refused to let them off the airplane to contain a rising international scandal.

The frustrated passengers took the pilots and the air hostesses of the flight and cabin crew hostages and demanded that the airplane be re-fueled and diverted to Sweden. The Bulgarian government was informed and on the following morning the commander of SOMP, Lt-col. Vasil Velkov, flew off to Berlin together with the ready assault group under Captain Dimitar Stefanov. The assault group consisted of 5 squads of 3 master sergeants for a total of 17 people. To deceive the hijackers, the East German authorities informed them that the Swedish government accepted the flight, but the Bulgarian Tupolev Tu-154 was unavailable for boarding so the group needed to board another airplane. The Bulgarian commandos devised a plan in which they hid in the Ikarus bus sent under that pretext to approach the airliner covertly. Once the ladders were in place and the doors were opened, the assault would force their way from the pilot cabin to the back of the plane.

Although the assault group was heavily armed with AK-74s, machine guns, sniper rifles, pistols, stun, tear gas, and smoke grenades, a decision was made that the assault group should leave all their firearms and combat knives behind and use only hand-to-hand combat to overwhelm the hijackers and to not endanger the hostages. Four of the five 3-men squads breached into the airliner with the fifth squad in reserve. The Iranians were quickly overwhelmed. The Bulgarian commandos were unharmed, and some of the Iranians suffered minor injuries.

The plane was refueled and took off to return to Burgas. Shortly after the plane was airborne, the hijackers rioted when they found out the destination. They were again rapidly subdued but out of desperation, some of them committed suicide by cutting their wrists with shattered glass from beverages. Once the airliner landed, the Iranians onboard were transported to the border and turned over to the Turkish authorities.

During the 1980s, the Bulgarian Communist government started a process of forceful assimilation of the Turkish minority, known as the "Revival Process", which triggered a series of terror acts in the whole country. The SOMP was directly involved in countering them and apprehending the perpetrators.
