= Kiril Petkov =

Prime Minister of Bulgaria from 2021 to 2022

- Кирил Петков
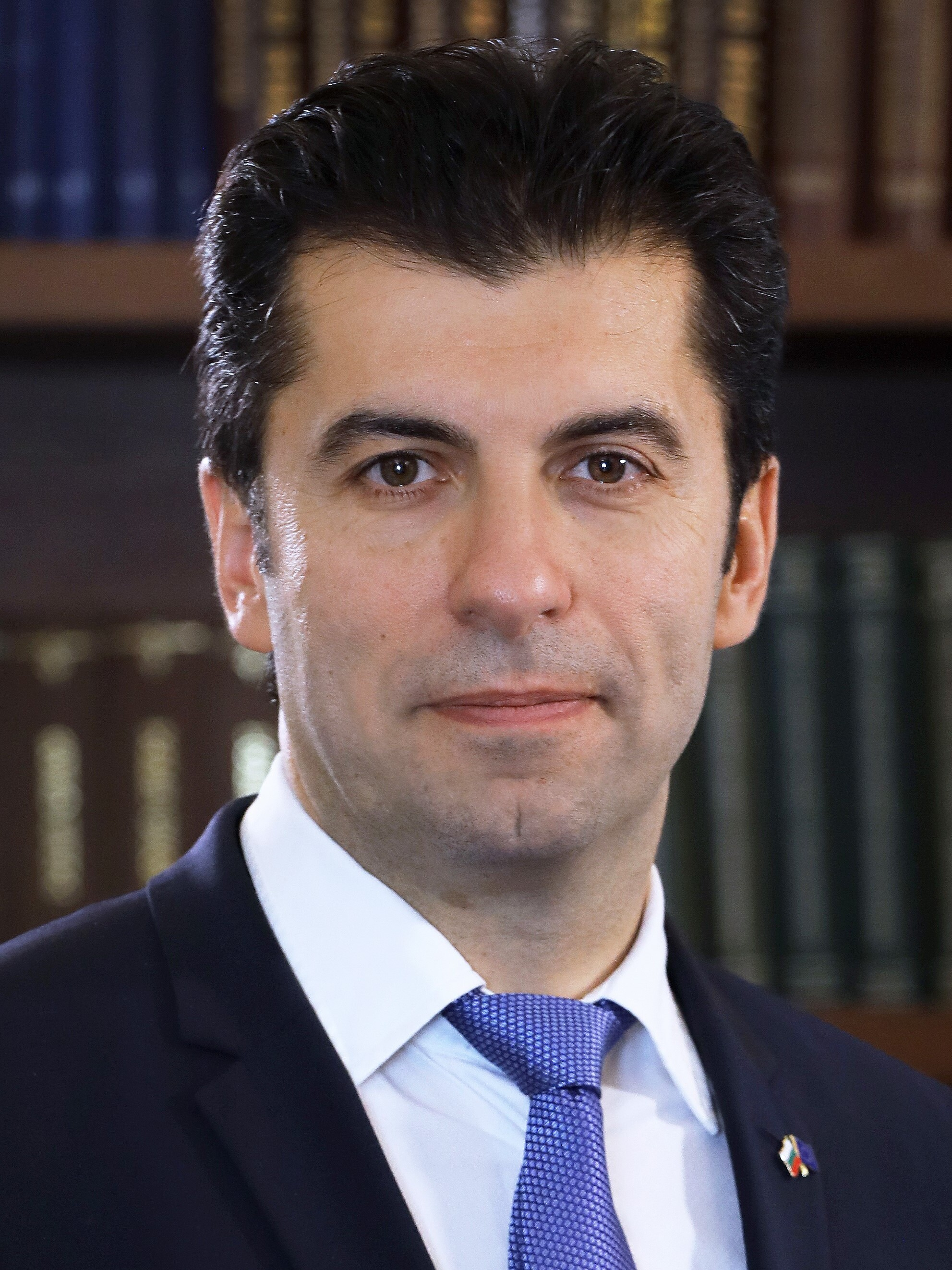
- Official portrait, 2021

Prime Minister of Bulgaria
- In office 13 December 2021 – 2 August 2022
- President: Rumen Radev
- Deputy: Assen Vassilev; Korneliya Ninova; Borislav Sandov; Grozdan Karadjov; Kalina Konstantinova
- Preceded by: Stefan Yanev
- Succeeded by: Galab Donev

Member of the National Assembly
- In office 19 October 2022 – 3 July 2025
- Constituency: 23rd MMC - Sofia

Leader of We Continue the Change
- In office 19 September 2021 – 25 June 2025 Serving with Assen Vassilev
- Preceded by: Position established
- Succeeded by: Assen Vassilev

Minister of Economy and Industry
- In office 12 May 2021 – 16 September 2021
- Prime Minister: Stefan Yanev
- Preceded by: Lachezar Borisov
- Succeeded by: Daniela Vezieva

Personal details
- Born: Kiril Petkov Petkov; 17 April 1980 (age 46) Plovdiv, PR Bulgaria
- Citizenship: Bulgarian; Canadian (until 2021)
- Party: PP (since 2021)
- Other political affiliations: DaB (2017–2021)
- Spouse: Linda Petkova (m. 2000)
- Children: 3
- Education: University of British Columbia (BCom); Harvard University (MBA)
- Occupation: Politician; economist; entrepreneur

Kiril Petkov Petkov (Bulgarian: Кирил Петков Петков; born 17 April 1980) is a Bulgarian politician, economist, and entrepreneur, who served as Prime Minister of Bulgaria from December 2021 to August 2022. He was the co-founder of We Continue the Change, a political party, alongside Assen Vassilev.

Petkov was born in Plovdiv, but grew up in Sofia and was educated by his parents, who were both teachers. He grew up with grandparents from different parts of his family. He holds a Bachelor of Commerce degree in finance from the University of British Columbia and a Master of Business Administration degree from Harvard University.

Petkov and Vassilev stated that they would start their own political project that would be an alternative anti-corruption party which could be seen as a "uniting force" between the other parties. Petkov, together with Assen Vassilev, they both formed the coalition We Continue the Change in late September 2021. Beforehand, they held temporary ministerial posts in Stefan Yanev's government. Stopping corruption, creating more possibilities for small and medium-sized firms, and luring high-tech investments have been the party's top concerns.

He became prime minister after the 2021 Bulgarian general election, which his party reached a deal to form a coalition with the left-wing Bulgarian Socialist Party (BSP), the populist There is Such a People (ITN) and the liberal Democratic Bulgaria, united under the motto "zero tolerance to corruption", for a four-year term Together, they have 134 seats in Bulgaria's 240-seat parliament. During his tenure, he opted for real diversification "tr" by constructing a gas interconnector from Komotini to Stara Zagora together with Kyriakos Mitsotakis, which Azeri gas would pass through. In foreign policy, Petkov advocated his support for Ukraine during the Russian invasion of Ukraine and anonymously supplied it because of the pro-Moscow politicians in government. His coalition government collapsed in June 2022 and put the blame on Russia and the Bulgarian mafia.

== Early life, family and education ==
Petkov was born on 17 April 1980, in Plovdiv. Both his parents were teachers, as his father taught biology, while his mother taught literature. He grew up spending time with his grandparents from the villages Sokolovo, Lovech Province, and Gramade, Kyustendil Province, which belong to different sides of his family. He holds a Bachelor of Commerce degree in finance from the University of British Columbia in Vancouver and a Master of Business Administration degree from Harvard Business School, where he was ranked in the top 10% of his class. One of his lecturers was Michael Porter, with whom he specialized in the development of cluster strategies. Petkov is one of the founders of the Center for Economic Strategies and Competitiveness at Sofia University (affiliated with Harvard University), where he has taught classes in economic development and microeconomics of competitiveness.

Kiril Petkov's father, Petko Petkov, was born in Sofia on 13 June 1958. He was a very low-income student who hardly completed his secondary school. After being turned down for admission to Sofia University, he applied for a biology degree at Plovdiv University during his second year of living in the barracks. His colleague from the barracks took the entrance exam instead of him, as military books are easy to forge. So he was accepted as a student at Plovdiv University. In the first year of his studies he met Kiril's mother - Veneta Petkova from Dupnitsa. During his student years between 1979 and 1983, Petko developed an attraction to sports like skiing and sailing, and from 1979 to 1983, he studied martial arts.

His mother, Veneta Petkova, taught Bulgarian language and literature before moving overseas with her family. Her birthplace is Plovdiv. Between 1977 and 1982, she completed her studies in Bulgarian Philology with a focus on Linguistics and Literature at Plovdiv University. While she was a student, she gave birth to her only son, Kiril Petkov.

== Business career ==
From 2001 to 2005, Petkov worked for the Canadian food company McCain Foods as a corporate development manager. Since 2007, he has been developing projects in the field of high value-added innovation, and his company ProViotik holds several patents in biotechnology in the United States. He oversees ProViotik, which is a Bulgarian business that has found success in the American, European, and Asian markets by developing cutting-edge bioproducts in collaboration with experts from across the globe. He developed a probiotic based on the Bulgarian strain of Lactobacillus bulgaricus, which is extracted from snowdrops and is then cultivated in carrot juice rather than milk.

== Political career ==
=== Early political career ===
On 11 January 2017, Petkov was elected in the executive board of the newly formed political party Yes, Bulgaria!.

=== Minister of Economy ===
From 12 May to 16 September 2021, Petkov served as Minister of Economy in the caretaker government of Stefan Yanev. Petkov succeeded Lachezar Borisov at the ministry today during a formal ceremony. In a discussion, the two talked about the difficulties confronting the Bulgarian economy and the steps made to support Bulgarian companies operating inside the Ministry's system during a difficult time. In order to maintain the stability of the Bulgarian economy, he stated that he will strive for transparency, professionalism, and responsible conduct in the upcoming months. Petkov, together with Assen Vassilev, proposed a scheme at the beginning of the COVID-19 pandemic to enable firms to continue operating, with employees undergoing testing on a regular basis to prevent the need to close. The health officials ruled it out as medically unnecessary, but during that time, when the pandemic continued, Petkov had to deal with economic difficulties. In his first television appearance as a minister, Petkov revealed that the state-controlled Bulgarian Development Bank had distributed 500 million euros in loans to just eight companies owned by four businessmen. He condemned the practice as 'outrageous' and initiated an audit of how loans had been allocated.

=== Party foundation and November 2021 election ===
On 19 September 2021, Petkov and Assen Vassilev launched their political project We Continue the Change (PP), an anti-corruption party seeking to be the uniting force that could bring all the other like-minded parties together to form a government. Both had been popular ministers in the Yanev caretaker government, but originally met while studying at Harvard Business School.

On 27 October 2021, the Constitutional Court of Bulgaria retroactively overturned the decree appointing Petkov as Minister of Economy due to his status as a dual citizen, as the Constitution of Bulgaria states that ministers must only be Bulgarian citizens. Although the position was retracted from him, his actions in the role were not nullified. Political opponents of Petkov, which included Lozan Panov, a presidential candidate and chairman of the Supreme Court of Cassation of Bulgaria, called for action to be taken on the issue. Petkov was previously a citizen of Canada, and stated that he had renounced his citizenship in April 2021, but Canadian government documents showed that the procedure was not officially completed until August 2021.

The party We Continue the Change had to run in the elections as part of an electoral coalition with one or more registered member parties because it was founded too late to get its own registration. Volt Bulgaria and Middle European Class, the former of which just departed the legislative alliance IBG-NI, were the means via which this was accomplished. The coalition is in agreement that the state's governance reforms should continue, adhering to the zero corruption concept and halting the opaque leaking of public funds. The coalition's primary objectives are to establish an economic climate that facilitates the unrestricted growth of small and medium-sized enterprises, draw in high-tech, strategic investments, distribute public resources fairly and equitably, and uphold the rule of law. The statement stated that the union will prioritise funding for high-quality education, the creation of more accessible and inexpensive health care, contemporary infrastructure, and social policies that guarantee adequate incomes for the elderly.

The November elections showed that PP had come first but without a majority of seats. Petkov announced that his party would work will all parties who were willing to fight corruption in the country. He later said he wanted to pursue "transparent" coalition negotiations with Democratic Bulgaria (DB) and There Is Such a People (ITN), and that he would be PP's nomination for prime minister, and wished to exclude DPS and GERB.

A series of talks on 18 policy areas were held between 23 November and 27 November, between the representatives of PP, the Bulgarian Socialist Party (BSP), ITN and DB. On 10 December, the leaders of the four parties confirmed that they had reached a coalition agreement, and would form Bulgaria's first regular government since the election in April 2021. Shortly after, President Rumen Radev announced that he had given the mandate to form a government to Petkov. On 12 December, Petkov presented the composition of the incoming government, which was approved by the National Assembly on 13 December 2021.

=== Prime Minister of Bulgaria ===
Petkov was elected prime minister of Bulgaria in the Parliament of Bulgaria on 13 December 2021, with 134 votes in favour and 104 against, and his new government was appointed on the same day by President Rumen Radev.

Portfolio	Minister	Took office	Left office	Party
Prime Minister	Kiril Petkov	13 December 2021	2 August 2022	PP
Deputy Prime Minister for EU funds Minister of Finance	Assen Vassilev	13 December 2021	2 August 2022	PP
Deputy Prime Minister for Good Governance	Kalina Konstantinova	13 December 2021	2 August 2022	PP
Deputy Prime Minister for Economy and Industry; Minister of Economy and Industry	Korneliya Ninova	13 December 2021	2 August 2022	BSPzB
Deputy Prime Minister for Regional Development and Public Works; Minister of Regional Development and Public Works	Grozdan Karadjov (Note: Proposed by ITN)	13 December 2021	2 August 2022	Independent
Deputy Prime Minister for Climate Policies; Minister of Environment and Water	Borislav Sandov	13 December 2021	2 August 2022	DB
Minister of Education and Science	Nikolai Denkov (Note: Proposed by PP)	13 December 2021	2 August 2022	Independent
Minister of Interior	Boyko Rashkov	13 December 2021	2 August 2022	Independent
Minister of Defense	Stefan Yanev	13 December 2021	1 March 2022	Independent
Minister of Defense	Dragomir Zakov	1 March 2022	2 August 2022	PP
Minister of Health	Asena Serbezova	13 December 2021	2 August 2022	PP
Minister of Transport and Communications	Nikolai Sabev	13 December 2021	2 August 2022	PP
Minister of Innovation and Growth	Daniel Lorer	13 December 2021	2 August 2022	PP
Minister of Culture	Atanas Atanasov	13 December 2021	2 August 2022	PP
Minister of Labour and Social Policy	Georgi Gyokov	13 December 2021	2 August 2022	BSPzB
Minister of Agriculture	Ivan Ivanov	13 December 2021	2 August 2022	BSPzB
Minister of Tourism	Hristo Prodanov	13 December 2021	2 August 2022	BSPzB
Minister of Foreign Affairs	Teodora Genchovska	13 December 2021	2 August 2022	ITN
Minister of Energy	Alexander Nikolov	13 December 2021	2 August 2022	ITN
Minister of Youth and Sports	Radostin Vassilev	13 December 2021	2 August 2022	ITN
Minister of Justice	Nadezhda Yordanova	13 December 2021	2 August 2022	DB
Minister of Electronic Governance	Bozhidar Bozhanov	13 December 2021	2 August 2022	DB

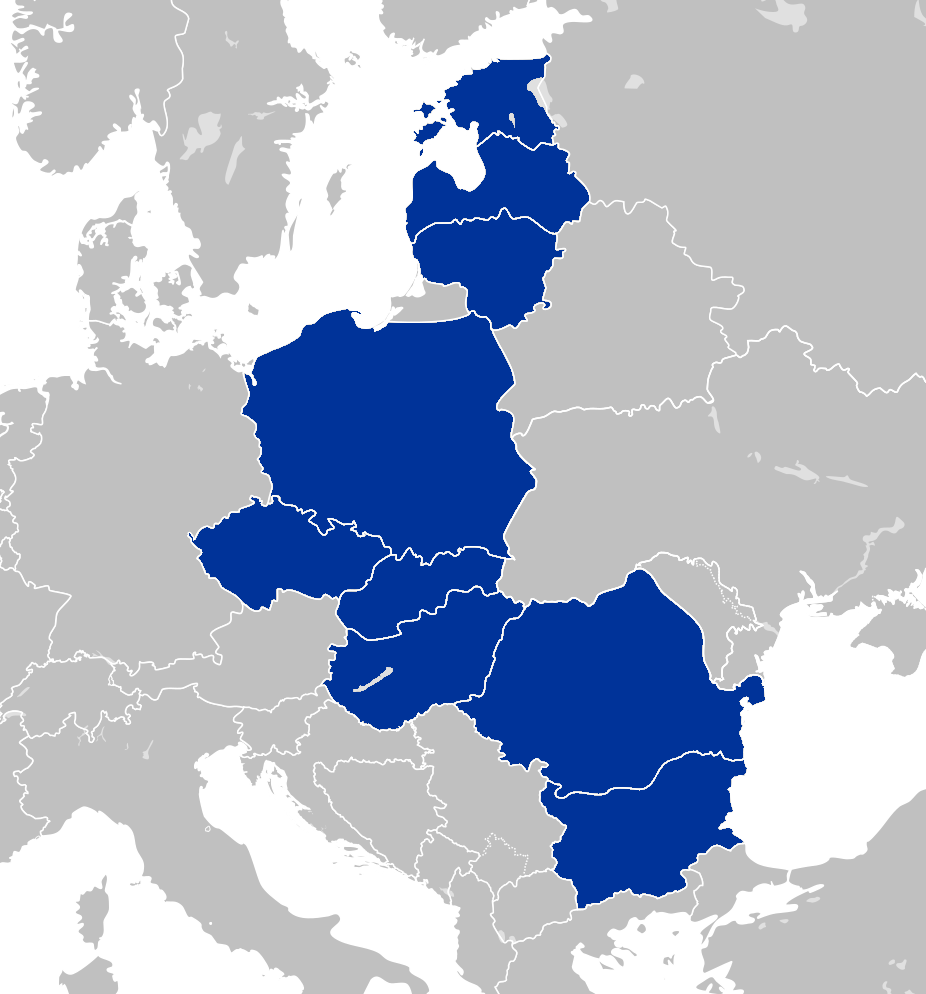
The B9 format countries, all the eastern front NATO allies.

On 19 March, Petkov was joined by US Secretary of Defense Lloyd J. Austin to announce that the Port of Varna and Port of Constanța would be joined by road and railroad connections as well as by energy infrastructure, in an effort to increase military mobility in the region. He said: "There will be a bridge over the Danube River... Logistics is just as important as military equipment... We can have really a working defense along the eastern flank [of NATO]."

In early June, Petkov's coalition partner, There Is Such a People, which had called for energy cooperation with Russia even after Gazprom cut off supplies to Bulgaria, withdrew from the coalition. On 22 June, the government faced a motion of no confidence, which it lost. Petkov formally resigned from his position as prime minister on 27 June, and was tasked by President Rumen Radev to form a new government.

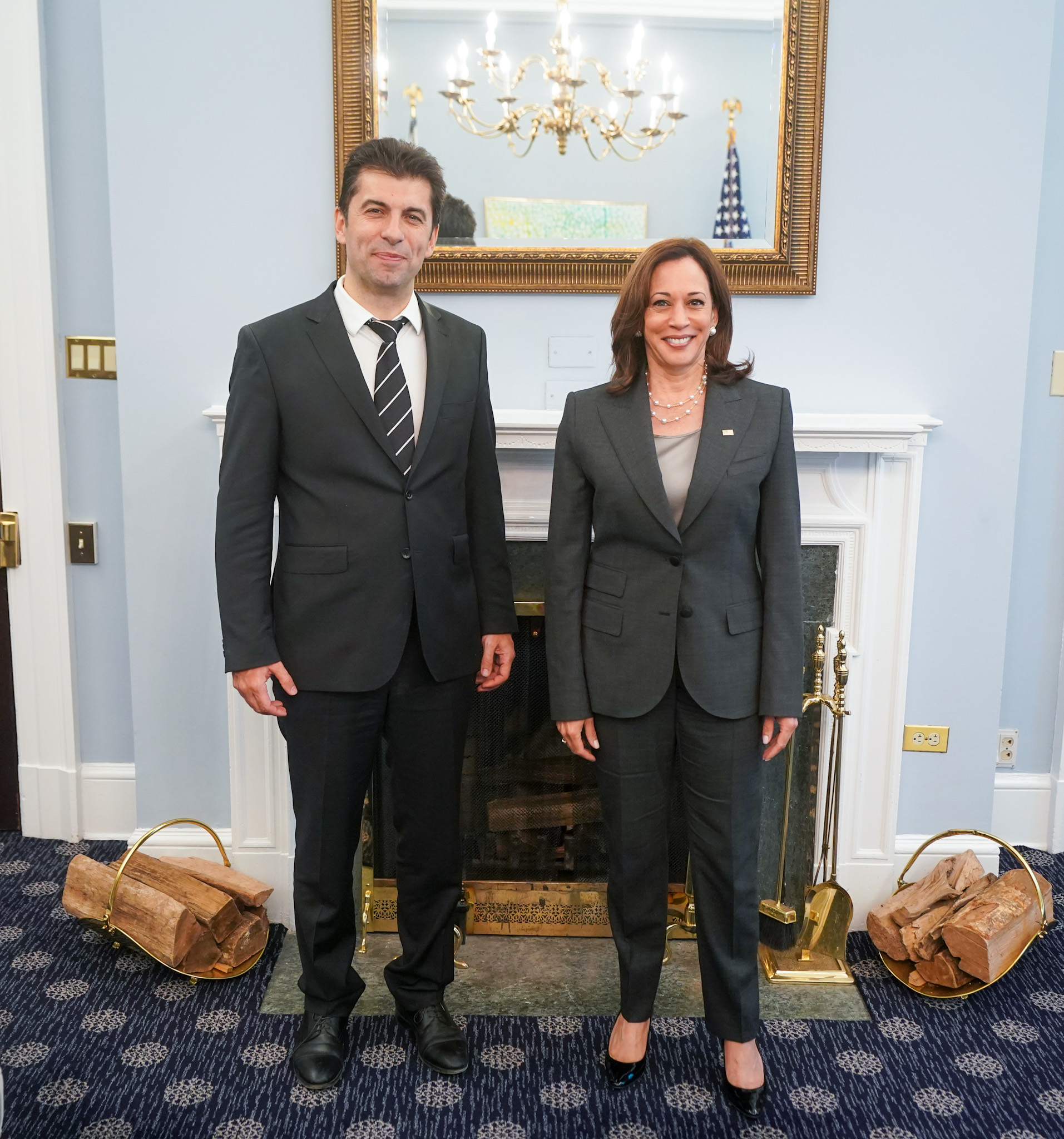
Petkov with US Vice President Kamala Harris on 10 May 2022

Petkov's coalition collapsed in June 2022 after his government lost a vote of no confidence. He left office on 2 August and was succeeded by the former minister of labor Galab Donev, in a caretaker government. President Radev subsequently called for a snap election to be held on 2 October.

==== Response to the 2022 Russian invasion of Ukraine ====
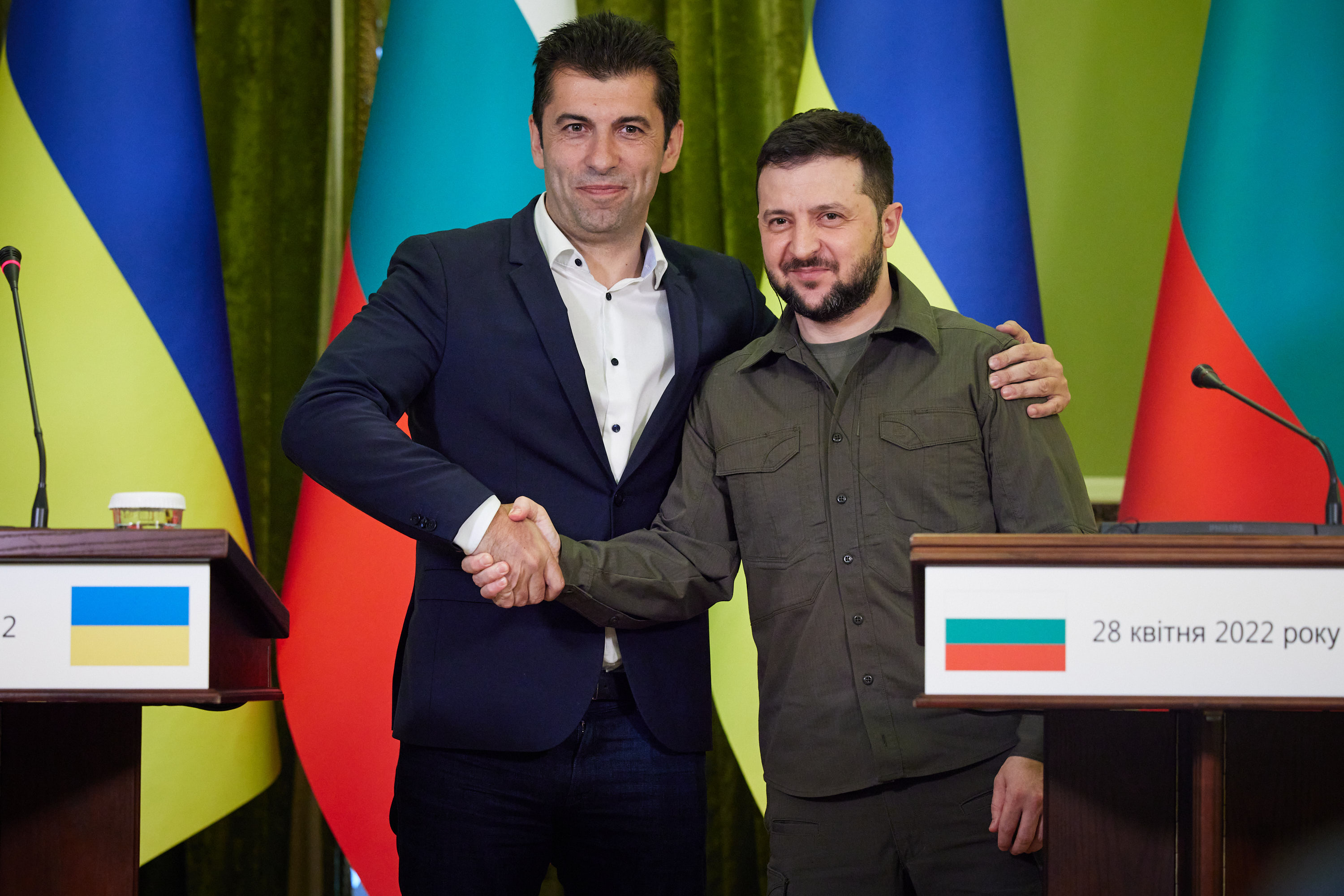
Petkov with Ukrainian president Volodymyr Zelenskyy on 28 April 2022

In the first week following the 2022 Russian invasion of Ukraine, Petkov announced that Bulgaria would welcome Ukrainian refugees. He stated, "These are not the refugees we are used to; these people are Europeans. These people are intelligent. They are educated people...This is not the refugee wave we have been used to, people we were not sure about their identity, people with unclear pasts, who could have been even terrorists." Later Petkov clarified, " I want to say very clearly, so as not to be misunderstood - the only thing I meant was that the Ukrainian refugees, some of them are also with a Bulgarian minority, they speak the language, they are much closer to us in terms of integration opportunities, but Bulgaria is absolutely open and does not have any discriminatory policies between different types of refugees."

In February, Petkov called for the resignation of Stefan Yanev from his position as Minister of Defense, after Yanev declined to use the word "war" in reference to Russia's invasion of Ukraine, instead referring to it as a "special operation", echoing language used by Russian president Vladimir Putin. Yanev was dismissed at the beginning of March. In May, Petkov recalled Bulgaria's ambassador to Russia, after Russian ambassador to Bulgaria Eleonora Mitrofanova drew a comparison between the war in Ukraine and Bulgaria's liberation from the Ottoman Empire.

In early 2022, Petkov secretly agreed to supply arms and fuel to the Ukrainian forces, but kept this secret whilst in government due to opposition among his governing coalition. On 4 May, the parliament approved the continuation of repairs for damaged Ukrainian military equipment, and announced that Bulgaria would continue to support Ukraine's membership in the EU, as well as Ukrainian refugees, who numbered more than 56,000 as of 7 June. Petkov noted Bulgaria's espousal of all sanctions against Russia, and would allow the use of the Port of Varna to transship goods that had been stifled by the Russian blockade of Odesa.

On 27 June, the Russian embassy in Sofia launched a charity appeal for Bulgarians to support the Russian invasion of Ukraine. One day later, Petkov announced the expulsion of 70 Russian diplomats over concerns of espionage. The Ministry of Foreign Affairs announced that Bulgaria would be temporarily closing down its diplomatic mission in Yekaterinburg and expected Russia to temporarily halt the activities of its own mission in Ruse, Bulgaria.

=== Return to opposition ===
The October 2022 election saw Petkov's coalition lose its majority and no coalition could be formed. This led to another snap election in April 2023, which saw similar results and no obvious governing coalition possible. Petkov's party came in second place, despite exit polls forecasting them as the winners. Kiril Petkov then stated on 8 July 2022, that his centrist party would probably have to abandon its intentions to present a new administration due to its inability to get a legislative majority.

Petkov, who heads the parliamentary EU, Schengen, and Eurozone committee, described Bulgaria's position on Schengen entrance, stressing requirements above a set date. Petkov emphasised during a news conference held at the National Assembly that Bulgaria is seeking admission without requiring a fresh vote in the European Council and that the country is concentrating on creating the circumstances necessary for automatic inclusion.

In 2024, his speech to the World Economic Forum in Davos, Kiril Petkov stressed that cooperative infrastructure development may help Bulgaria, Romania, and Greece attain the highest GDP growth in Europe. During a conversation hosted by "Greek House Davos" with the topic "Rethink the Ports as Hubs: The Strategic importance for Greece, Balkans and Europe," Petkov emphasised the need of interconnected infrastructure in promoting prosperity and economic independence. He also emphasised Bulgaria's accomplishment of reducing its 95% reliance on Russian gas to 0%, noting a variety of energy sources as a crucial element in attaining political and economic independence and claiming that the Balkans might achieve the highest GDP growth in Europe with the construction of vital infrastructure.

=== Rotation coalition government of GERB and PP–DB ===
Prior to the snap 2023 election, Petkov's PP merged with DB to form a joint electoral list. The election resulted in no clear outcome. After several rounds of discussions, GERB and PP–DB agreed upon a rotation government, claimed to be a "non-coalition", where PP–DB's Nikolai Denkov would start with the premiership, with GERB's Mariya Gabriel serving as Deputy Prime Minister, and after nine months, they would switch positions. This however, failed to materialize, leading to another snap election the following year.

=== Resignation ===
Petkov announced he would step down as MP and co-leader of PP–DB in June 2025, citing responsibility for personnel misjudgments at the level of district mayors. He was officially dismissed as an MP on 3 July.

== Notes ==
Political offices
Preceded by Lachezar Borisov	Minister of Economy; 2021	Succeeded by Daniela Vezieva
Preceded by Stefan Yanev	Prime Minister of Bulgaria; 2021–2022	Succeeded by Galab Donev
Party political offices
New political party	Co-Leader of We Continue the Change; 2021–2015; Served alongside: Assen Vassilev	Incumbent
