= Beloslav =

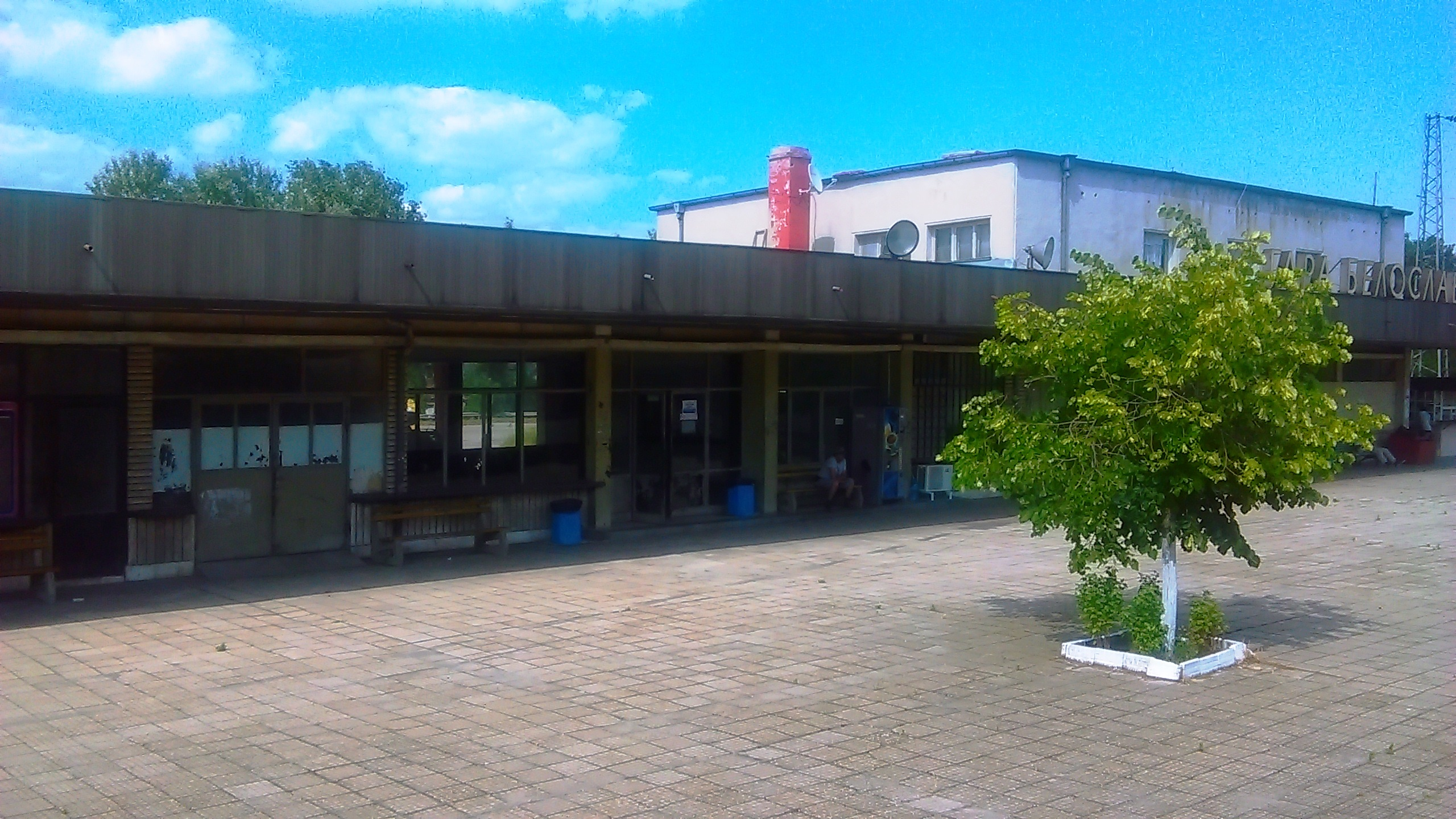

- Location of Beloslav
- Coordinates: 43°11′N 27°42′E
- Country: Bulgaria
- Provinces (Oblast): Varna

Government
  - Mayor: Deyan Ivanov
- Elevation: 74 m (243 ft)

Population (31.12.2009)
  - Total: 7,937
- Time zone: UTC+2 (EET)
  - Summer (DST): UTC+3 (EEST)
- Postal Code: 9178
- Area code: 05112

Beloslav (Bulgarian: Белослав [bɛɫoˈsɫaf]) is a small industrial town in Varna Province, Northeastern Bulgaria, located 19 km away to the west from Varna downtown and Bulgarian Black Sea coast. It is the administrative centre of the homonymous Beloslav Municipality. As of December 2009, the town had a population of 7,937. Beloslav is located along the eastern edge of Lake Beloslav and on both sides of the canal connecting it with Lake Varna. The two parts of town are connected by a vehicle and passenger ferry across the canal. A road bridge is to be built in the near future over the canal east of town carrying a bypass of the E87 international highway now passing through downtown Varna via the Asparuhov most bridge.

Beloslav is an ancient settlement populated probably about 12,000 years ago. The first settlers inhabited the cave near today's town, where 12,000-year-old items were found. Around the 5th century BC the Thracians settled in the region. The town was also known as Krushevo, Gebedzhe (Turkish: Gebece), Belovo, and Belevo. The Ottoman name is still used today in certain situations.

Beloslav is a transportation and industrial hub of national significance, part of the Varna-Devnya Industrial Complex. Transportation facilities include the railway and ro-ro ferry terminal with lines to Ukraine, Russia and Georgia served by the Sindel-razpredelitelna marshalling yard, the seaports of Varna Power Plant and LesPort of the Port of Varna complex, and a couple of railway stations. The largest (1320 MW capacity plus an 880 MW natural gas-fueled installation under development) thermal power plant in the nation, TEC Varna, part of the CEZ Group, and the Terem Flotski Arsenal shipbuilding/repair yard, comprising also an Oceanic-Creations facility, are located just east of town. TEC Varna materialized the largest cash privatization deal in the nation after 1989.

Beloslav is an old centre of artistic glassblowing and fireproof glassmaking and currently supplies glass vials to international pharmaceutical companies. In 2007, development of a new business and logistics centre started on the site of a former glass factory; it will also include two new manufacturing facilities and a port terminal for handling natural gas condensate, and will create a total of 2,000 jobs. The northeastern industrial park also contains several construction operations.

Beloslav is the seat of a municipality, which also includes the following villages:

- Ezerovo
- Razdelna
- Strashimirovo
