= Organization of the Jews in Bulgaria =

The Organization of the Jews in Bulgaria (OJB), "Shalom", coordinates the different Jewish communities in Bulgaria, a country where about 8000 Jews live. This organization organizes programs and projects. The tasks of Shalom – OJB are mainly:

- Keeping up and promoting the Jewish values and traditions regarding ethnological, linguistic and cultural aspects
- Defending the constitutional rights of its members as well as of all Jews in Bulgaria against the state, its organs and other public and political facilities of the state
- Supporting the reduction of racism, totalitarianism, antidemocratical tendencies, fascism, anti-Semitism and national chauvinism in any kind
- Cooperating with any societies and organizations at home and abroad which correlate to the principles of democracy and human rights
- Organizing seminars, academic facilities and other training centers
- Marketing and popularization of the Jewish values
- Promoting education and culture
- Organizing concerts, stage plays and book presentations
- Building up data archives
- Maintaining the historical sites (synagogues, graves, memorials etc.)

== Combating hate speech ==
In February 2026, the OJB welcomed a final ruling by Bulgaria's Supreme Administrative Court, which upheld a 2023 decision by the Commission for Protection Against Discrimination (affirmed by lower courts, including the Varna Administrative Court in 2025). The ruling found that local politician Kostadin Kostadinov had engaged in harassment and discriminatory speech against Member of Parliament Daniel Lorer on grounds of religion, ethnicity, and origin through a series of Facebook posts from 2022–2023. The OJB described the decision as an important step toward public responsibility and intolerance of hate speech, stating that rhetoric addressing individuals "on the basis of their Jewish or any other origin" undermines the fundamental principles of the rule of law, and emphasized the need for accountability from those in high office.
