= List of ports in Bulgaria =

This list of Ports and harbours in Bulgaria details the ports, harbours around the coast of Bulgaria.

== List of ports and harbours in Bulgaria ==
Port/Harbour name	Districts	Town name	Coordinates	UN/Locode	Max. draught (m)	Max. deadweight (t)	Remarks
Port of Varna	Varna Province	Varna	43°11′N 27°54′E	BGVAR	11.1	82056	Large-sized port on the coast of Varna Bay.
Port of Burgas	Burgas Province	Burgas	42°27′N 27°29′E	BGBOJ	12	115812	Medium-sized port on the coast of the Gulf of Burgas.
Burgas Rosenetz	Burgas Province	Burgas	42°27′N 27°32′E	BGBOJ			Oil terminal 3.5km SE of Port of Burgas
Port of Balchik	Dobrich Province	Balchik	43°24′N 28°09′E	BGBAL	5.7	21955	Medium-sized port
Port of Ruse	Ruse Province	Ruse	43°50′N 25°56′E	BGRDU	3.3	9084	Medium-sized port on the right bank of the Danube.
Port of Sozopol	Burgas Province	Sozopol	42°25′N 27°41′E	BGSOZ	2.4	100	Medium-sized port
Port of Pomorie	Burgas Province	Pomorie	42°33′N 27°37′E	BGPOR	1.6		Medium-sized port
