= Petar Dilov =

Bulgarian politician (born 1984)

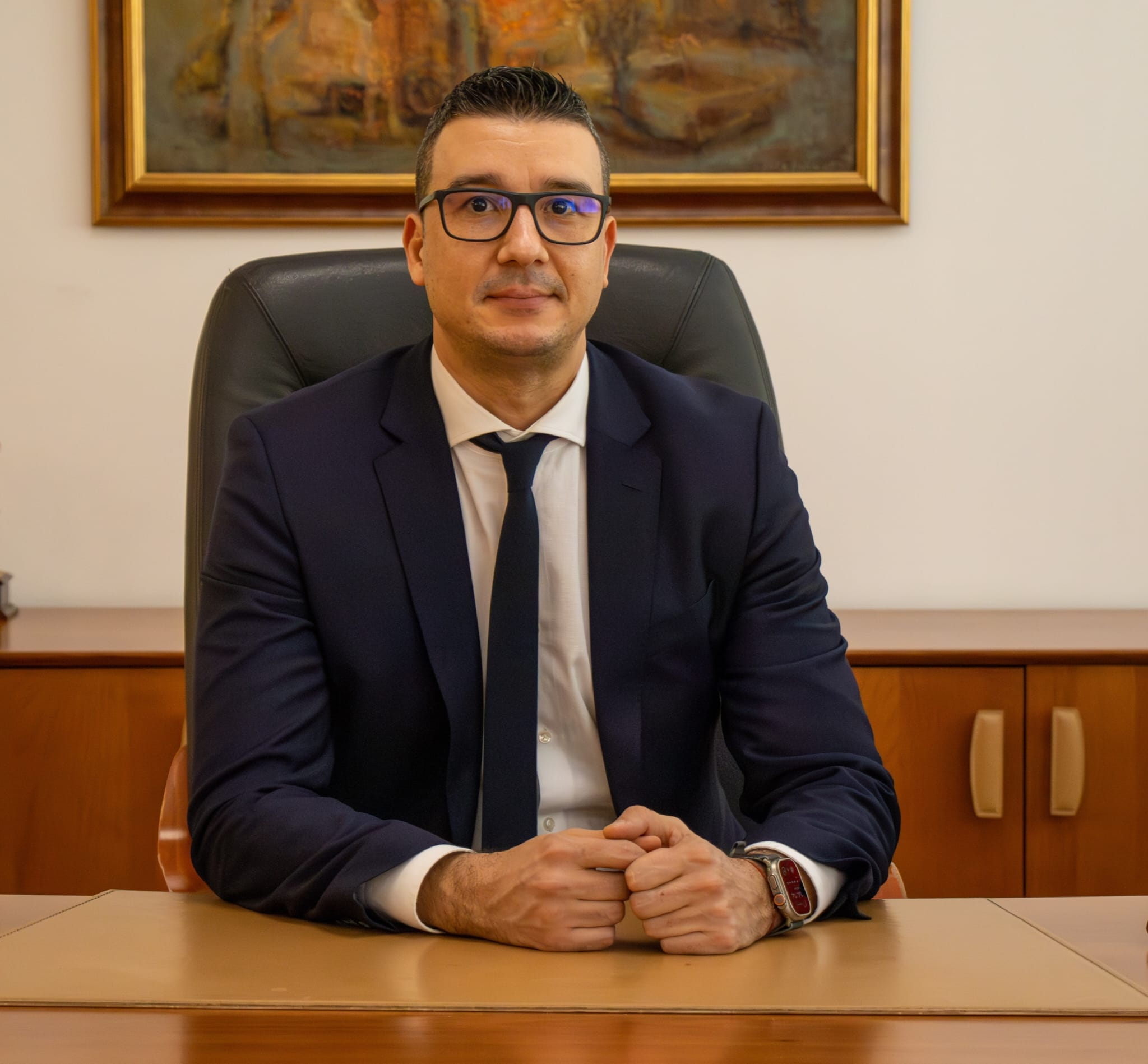

Minister of Economy and Industry
- In office 16 January 2025 – 19 February 2026
- Prime Minister: Rosen Zhelyazkov
- Preceded by: Petko Nikolov
- Succeeded by: Irina Shtonova (acting)

Personal details
- Born: 1985 (age 40–41)
- Party: Independent

Petar Dilov (Bulgarian: Петър Дилов; born 1985) is a Bulgarian politician who served as minister of economy and industry between 2025 and 2026. From 2011 to 2025, he worked for the Bulgarian National Bank.
