= Ezerovo =

Ezerovo may refer to the following places in Bulgaria:

- Ezerovo, Plovdiv Province
- Ezerovo, Varna Province, a village in Beloslav Municipality
- Ezerovo, a village merged with Ustovo and Raykovo in 1960 to form the town of Smolyan
