= Irena Mladenova =

Bulgarian economist, professor and politician

- Ирена Младенова
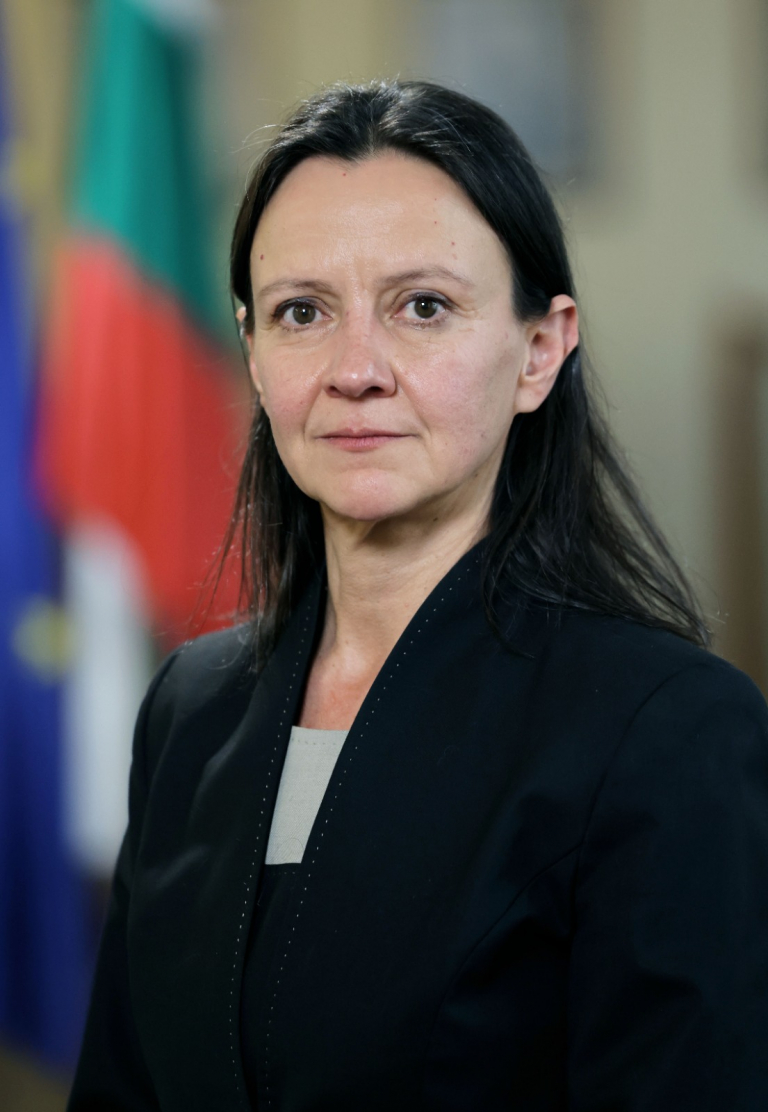
- Official portrait, 2026

Acting Minister of Innovation and Growth
- In office 19 February 2026 – 8 May 2026
- Prime Minister: Andrey Gyurov
- Preceded by: Tomislav Donchev
- Succeeded by: Ivan Vasilev

Personal details
- Education: Sofia University; University of Udine

Irena Mladenova (Bulgarian: Ирена Младенова) is a Bulgarian economist, professor and politician, who served as acting Minister of Innovation and Growth of Bulgaria in 2026. She previously served as acting Deputy Minister of Economy in 2013, 2014 and 2021.

== Education ==
Mladenova obtained a master's degree in strategic management from Sofia University, where she also obtained a PhD in business administration with the thesis Organizational capacity for change, adaptability and organizational performance, and a master's degree in banking and entrepreneurship through a program at the University of Udine.

== Career ==
She has developed a career in the private sector at national and international companies such as Kearney and PwC, being consultor and working in the fields of finance sector, european integration and entrepreneurship, and in academic research on business development, entrepreneurship, management, and marketing and holds management positions at the Faculty of Economics and Business Administration of the Sofia University, where she is also a professor.

She has also been an adviser at the Ministry of Economy since 2011 and was acting Deputy Minister of Economy in 2013, 2014 and 2021. Mladenova also worked at the administration of President of Bulgaria and headed the Economic Policy Institute.

On 18 February 2026 Mladenova was announced as the new Minister of Innovation and Growth of the caretaker cabinet of Prime Minister Andrey Gyurov and was sworn in on 19 February 2026.
