= Atanas Atanasov (politician, born 1990) =

Bulgarian politician from the Yes Bulgaria (born 1990)

- Атанас Атанасов
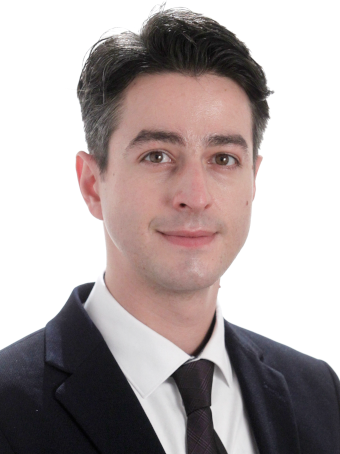
- Official portrait, 2021

Member of the Haskovo City Council
- Incumbent
- Assumed office 10 November 2023

Minister of Culture
- In office 13 December 2021 – 2 August 2022
- Prime Minister: Kiril Petkov
- Preceded by: Velislav Minekov
- Succeeded by: Velislav Minekov

Personal details
- Born: April 3, 1990 (age 36) Haskovo, Bulgaria
- Party: We Continue the Change
- Education: Whitman College (BA)
- Occupation: politician; activist

Atanas Petrov Atanasov is a Bulgarian politician and activist who served as the Minister of Culture between 2021 and 2022 in the Petkov Government and is currently a Member of the Haskovo City Council.

== Early life and education ==
Atanas Atanasov was born on April 3, 1990 in Haskovo, Bulgaria. After graduating from high school, he earned a BA degree in Theatre Arts from Whitman College in the United States, where he was accepted on a full scholarship and graduated in the top 3% of his class.

== Political career ==
At the parliamentary elections in November 2021, Atanasov was elected MP from the newly formed We Continue the Change party.

On 13 December 2021 he was nominated and sworn in as Minister of Culture in the Petkov Government. A successful vote of no confidence against the government was cast on June 22, 2022, marking an end to Atnasov's rather short governance.

At the 2023 Bulgarian local elections, Atanasov was elected to serve as a Member of the Haskovo City Council.
