= Aleksandar Pulev =

Bulgarian politician

- Александър Пулев
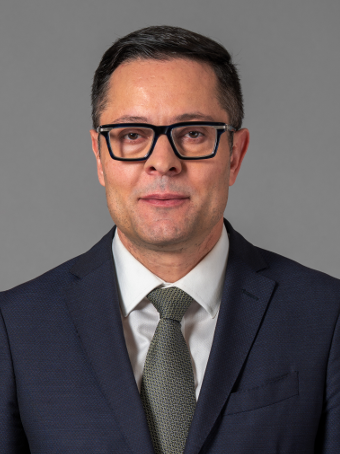
- Official portrait, 2026

Deputy Prime Minister of Bulgaria (Note: Serving alongside Galab Donev, Atanas Pekanov and Ivo Hristov.)
- Incumbent
- Assumed office 8 May 2026
- Prime Minister: Rumen Radev
- Preceded by: Andrey Yankulov (Note: Yankulov, alongside Maria Nedina.)

Minister of Economy, Investment and Industry
- Incumbent
- Assumed office 8 May 2026
- Prime Minister: Rumen Radev
- Preceded by: Irina Shtonova

Minister of Innovation and Growth
- In office 2 August 2022 – 6 June 2023
- Prime Minister: Galab Donev
- Preceded by: Daniel Lorer
- Succeeded by: Milena Stoycheva

Personal details
- Born: Aleksandar Georgiev Pulev; 5 February 1981 (age 45) Plovdiv, PR Bulgaria
- Party: Progressive Bulgaria
- Other political affiliations: Independent (until 2026)
- Education: University of Maine; Oxford University
- Occupation: Politician; economist

Aleksandar Georgiev Pulev (Bulgarian: Александър Георгиев Пулев, born February 5, 1981) is a Bulgarian politician serving as Deputy Prime Minister and Minister of Economy, Investment and Industry. A member of Progressive Bulgaria, he previously served as Minister of Innovation and Growth from 2022 to 2023.
