= Beloslav Municipality =

Beloslav Municipality Община Белослав
- Municipality
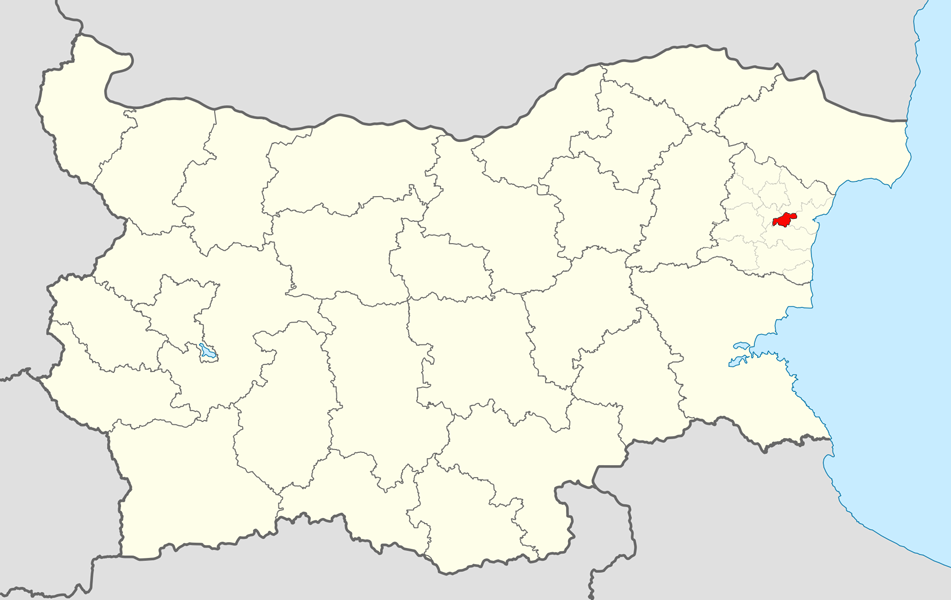
- Beloslav Municipality within Bulgaria and Varna Province.
- Coordinates: 43°10′N 27°41′E
- Country: Bulgaria
- Province (Oblast): Varna
- Admin. centre (Obshtinski tsentar): Beloslav

Area
  - Total: 91.3 km^{2} (35.3 sq mi)

Population (December 2009)
  - Total: 11,257
  - Density: 123/km^{2} (319/sq mi)
- Time zone: UTC+2 (EET)
  - Summer (DST): UTC+3 (EEST)

Beloslav Municipality (Bulgarian: Община Белослав) is a municipality (obshtina) in Varna Province, Northeastern Bulgaria, not far from the Bulgarian Black Sea Coast. It is named after its administrative centre - the town of Beloslav.

The municipality embraces a territory of 91.3 km^{2} (35.3 sq mi) with a population, as of December 2009, of 11,257 inhabitants.

== Settlements ==
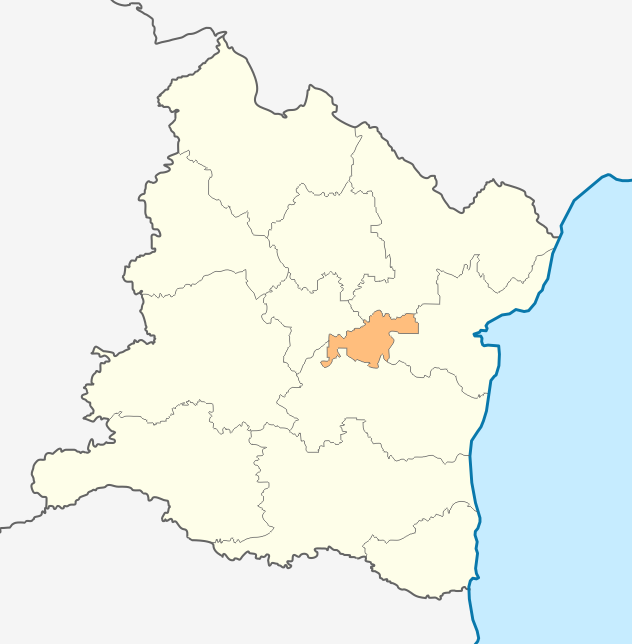
Beloslav Municipality within Varna Province

Beloslav Municipality includes the following 4 places (towns are shown in bold):

Town/Village	Cyrillic	Population (December 2009)
**Beloslav**	**Белослав**	7,937
Ezerovo	Езерово	1,845
Razdelna	Разделна	537
Strashimirovo	Страшимирово	938
Total		11,257

== Demography ==
The following table shows the change of the population during the last four decades.

Beloslav Municipality
**Year**	1975	1985	1992	**2001**	2005	2007	2009	**2011**
**Population**	13,502	12,687	11,079	11,131	11,195	11,309	11,257	...
Sources: Census 2001, Census 2011, „pop-stat.mashke.org“,

=== Religion ===
According to the latest Bulgarian census of 2011, the religious composition, among those who answered the optional question on religious identification, was the following:

Religious composition of Beloslav Municipality
Orthodox Christianity	82.5%
Catholicism	0.4%
Protestantism	0.7%
Islam	4.8%
No religion	5.4%
Prefer not to answer, others and indefinable	6.2%

An overwhelming majority of the population of Beloslav Municipality identify themselves as Christians. At the 2011 census, 82.5% of respondents identified as Orthodox Christians belonging to the Bulgarian Orthodox Church.

== See also ==
- Provinces of Bulgaria
- Municipalities of Bulgaria
- List of cities and towns in Bulgaria
