= Varna Power Plant =

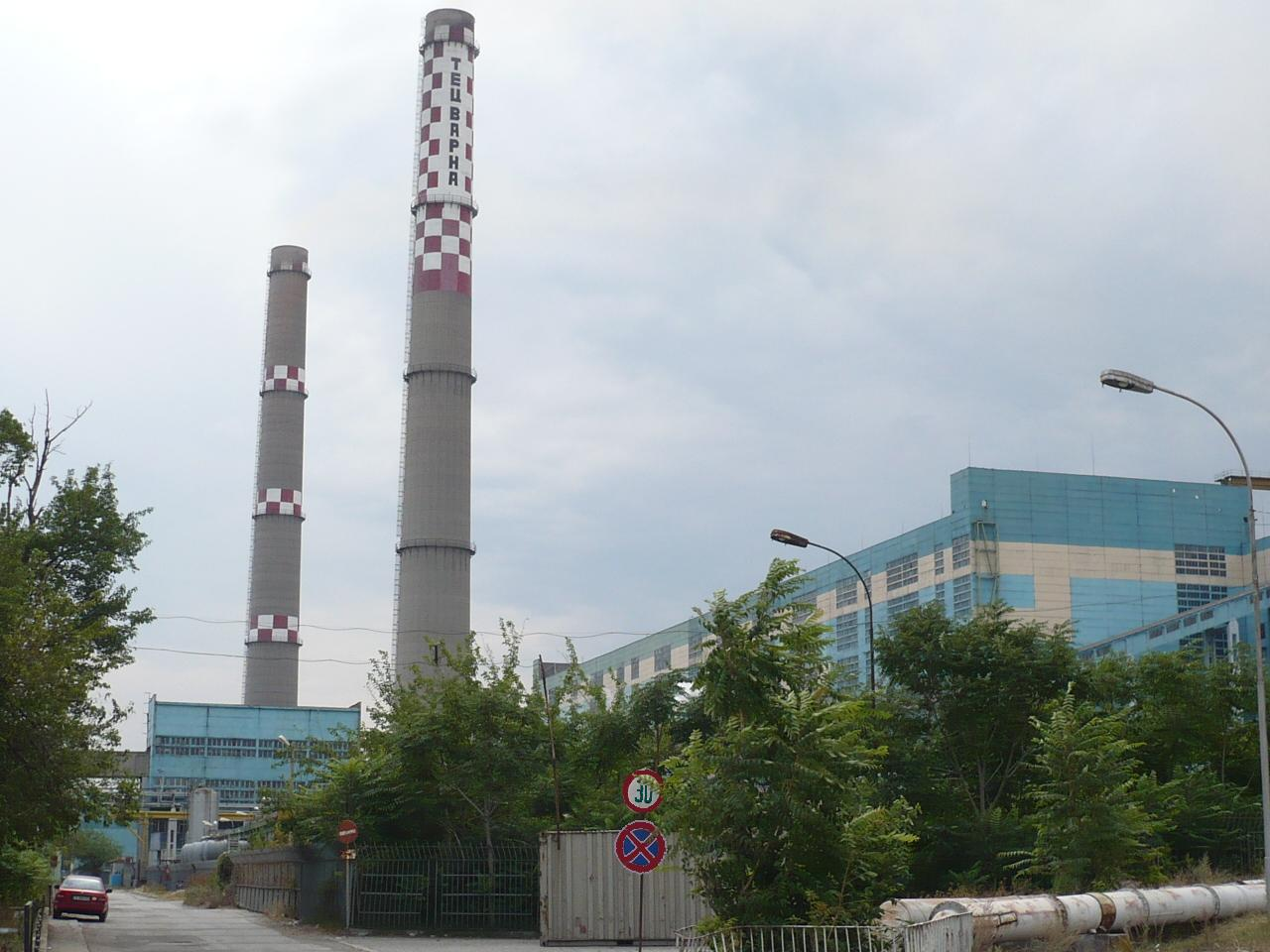
- Varna TPP
- Country: Bulgaria
- Location: Ezerovo, near Varna
- Coordinates: 43°12′2″N 27°47′10″E
- Status: Operational
- Commission date: 1969
- Owner: CEZ

Thermal power station
- Primary fuel: Fossil gas or Coal

Power generation
- Units operational: 6
- Nameplate capacity: 1260 MW

External links
- Website: varna-tpp.com
- Commons: Related media on Commons

Varna Thermal Power Plant is a coal or gas-fired power plant located on the northern shore of the Lake Varna near the village of Ezerovo at 12 km to the west of Varna, eastern Bulgaria. It was bought by the Czech energy company CEZ Group.

The plant was constructed at that location because it works with anthracite coal imported mainly from Ukraine. There is a coal port built nearby with room for three ships - two for ships up to 12,000 t and one for ships up to 55,000 t.

The plant has 6 turbines with installed power of 210 MW which makes a total of 1,260 MW. It has two chimneys, each with a height of 150 metres. Varna TPP is the second largest coal power plant in the Balkan Peninsula after Maritsa Iztok 2 which is also situated in Bulgaria. In 2006, it produced 3 billion kWh electricity. Varna TPP has 900 employees. The income from the sold electrical energy is worth of 173,000,000 BGN or approximately €80,000,000.

Two turbines working with gas with installed power of 440 MW each are planned to be constructed by 2012 as a part of the company's strategy to reduce pollution.

== See also ==
- Energy in Bulgaria
