= Dragomir Zakov =

Bulgarian politician

- Драгомир Заков
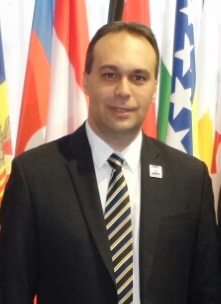

Minister of Defence
- In office 1 March 2022 – 2 August 2022
- Prime Minister: Kiril Petkov
- Preceded by: Stefan Yanev
- Succeeded by: Dimitar Stoyanov

Permanent Representative of Bulgaria to NATO
- In office 25 March 2019 – 1 March 2022

Personal details
- Born: 24 July 1975 (age 51) Sofia, Bulgaria
- Party: Independent
- Children: 2
- Education: University of National and World Economy (MIB)
- Occupation: Politician; diplomat

Dragomir Zakov (Bulgarian: Драгомир Заков; born 24 July 1975) is a Bulgarian politician and diplomat, who served as the Minister of Defense in the Petkov Government from March to August 2022. He served as head of the Permanent Delegation of the Republic of Bulgaria to NATO from 25 March 2019 to 1 March 2022.

== Personal life and education ==
Zakov was born on 24 July 1975 in Sofia. He completed his secondary education at the 9th French Language School "Alphonse de Lamartine". He went on to complete a Bachelor of International Economic Relations in 1998 and a Master of International Business in 1999 from the University of National and World Economy.

He is married and has 2 children. He can speak 4 languages; Bulgarian, French, Russian and English.

== Diplomatic career ==
Zakov served in the NATO Attaché from March 2002 to February 2004. In the same year he became the third secretary of the permanent delegation of Bulgaria to NATO.

In 2008 he held the position of Second Secretary in the Directorate of the Ministry of Foreign Affairs, responsible for policy and security and the Organization for Security and Cooperation in Europe.

In the period of 2011 to 2014 he was the first secretary of the Bulgarian delegation to the United Nations. In the next two years he was an advisor and head of various departments of the Ministry of Foreign Affairs. Between 2015 and 2016 he specialized at the European Security and Defense College. In August 2016, he returned to NATO as an advisor. In February 2017, he again took a role in the Ministry of Foreign Affairs, with the rank of Minister Plenipotentiary.

He served as head of the Permanent Delegation of the Republic of Bulgaria to NATO from 25 March 2019 to 1 March 2022.

== Political career ==
Zakov was proposed by prime minister Kiril Petkov on 1 March 2022 to succeed Stefan Yanev. He was approved as Minister of Defense by the 47th National Assembly, with the support of 184 members of the 240-seat parliament, no votes against and 33 abstentions.

Solomon Passy, the former foreign minister, praised the appointment and said that, "Zakov is the right man for the chair of military minister." He added, "I think this is one of the finest diplomats that can be selected for this job, and I think that his coming from NATO to take over the MoD is very significant, very crucial. I congratulate the Prime Minister for the extremely good choice."

== Honours and awards ==
- Silver medal of honour of the Minister of Foreign Affairs of Bulgaria
- Certificate awarded by the US Army in recognition for the support to Operation Joint Guardian in Kosovo

Political offices
Preceded by Stefan Yanev	Minister of Defence of Bulgaria; 1 March 2022 – 2 August 2022	Succeeded by Dimitar Stoyanov
