= Daniel Lorer =

Bulgarian politician

- Даниел Лорер
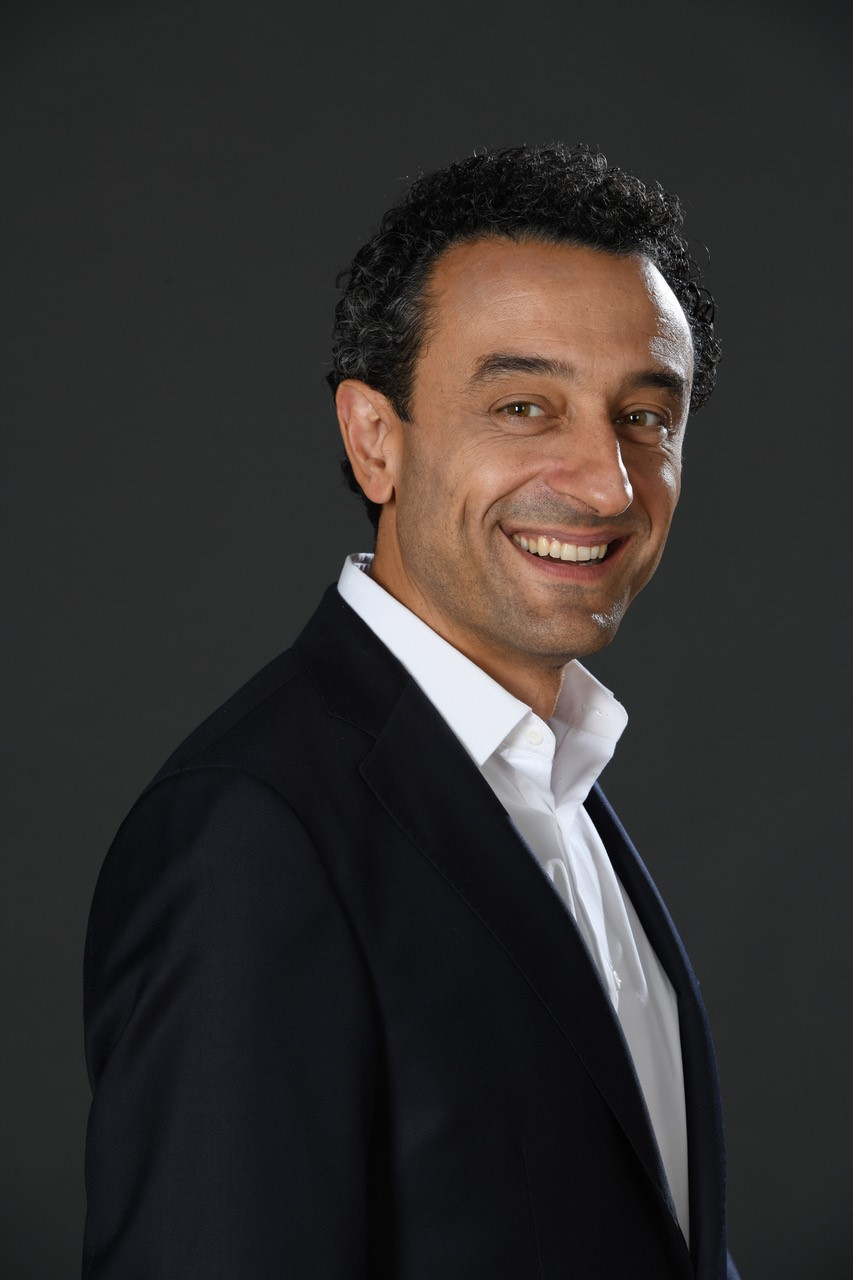
- Lorer in 2021

Member of the National Assembly
- Incumbent
- Assumed office 19 October 2022
- Constituency: 3rd MMC - Varna

Minister of Innovation and Growth
- In office 13 December 2021 – 2 August 2022
- Prime Minister: Kiril Petkov
- Preceded by: Position established
- Succeeded by: Aleksandur Pulev

Personal details
- Born: Daniel Maksim Lorer; 28 May 1976 (age 50) Sofia, PR Bulgaria
- Party: Independent (since 2024); PP (2021-2024)
- Other political affiliations: PP-DB (since 2023)
- Children: 3
- Education: Tel Aviv University
- Occupation: Politician; businessman

Daniel Maksim Lorer (Bulgarian: Даниел Лорер; born 28 May 1976) is a Bulgarian politician who served as the first Minister of Innovation and Growth of Bulgaria in the Petkov Government and is currently a Member of the National Assembly of Bulgaria.

== Early life and education ==
Daniel Lorer graduated from the First English Language School. His mother is a microelectronics engineer and a European bridge champion, while his father is a mathematician, lecturer at Sofia University and entrepreneur.

He graduated in computer science and business administration from Tel Aviv University. He has worked and lived in Sofia, Tel Aviv, Brussels, Zürich and Barcelona and speaks English, Hebrew, French, Russian and some German.

== Political career ==
From 1995 to 1998 he participated in the youth movement of the Israeli Labor Party.

In 2013, he was an advisor to the Minister of Electronic Governance in Bulgaria in the caretaker government of Marin Raykov (13 March - 29 May 2013), appointed by President Rosen Plevneliev.

In 2021, he became an advisor of the caretaker Minister of Economy Kiril Petkov in the first caretaker government of Stefan Yanev, appointed by President Rumen Radev.

He was elected as a member of the 47th National Assembly in the 2021 Bulgarian general election and served for 10 days before becoming minister in the Petkov Government.

He served as the first Minister of Innovation and Growth in the Petkov Government (13 December 2021 - 2 August 2022).

He was re-elected as a representative both in the 48th and the 49th National Assemblies. He is currently a member of the Foreign Policy committee and the Economic Policy and Innovation committee.

=== Discrimination case ===
In February 2026, Bulgaria's Supreme Administrative Court issued a final ruling, upholding a 2023 decision by the Commission for Protection Against Discrimination (affirmed by lower courts, including the Varna Administrative Court in 2025), finding that politician Kostadin Kostadinov had engaged in harassment and discriminatory speech against Lorer on grounds of religion, ethnicity, and origin. The ruling stemmed from a series of Facebook posts by Kostadinov between 2022 and 2023 that referred to Lorer as a "foreigner", "national traitor", "foreign agent", and "anti-human", likened him to a reptile, and suggested he wished for Bulgarians and the Bulgarian state to disappear. The court ordered Kostadinov to remove six specific posts from his account and filter offensive comments, citing Bulgarian anti-discrimination law and the European Convention on Human Rights.
