= Ivo Hristov =

Bulgarian politician (born 1970)

- Иво Христов
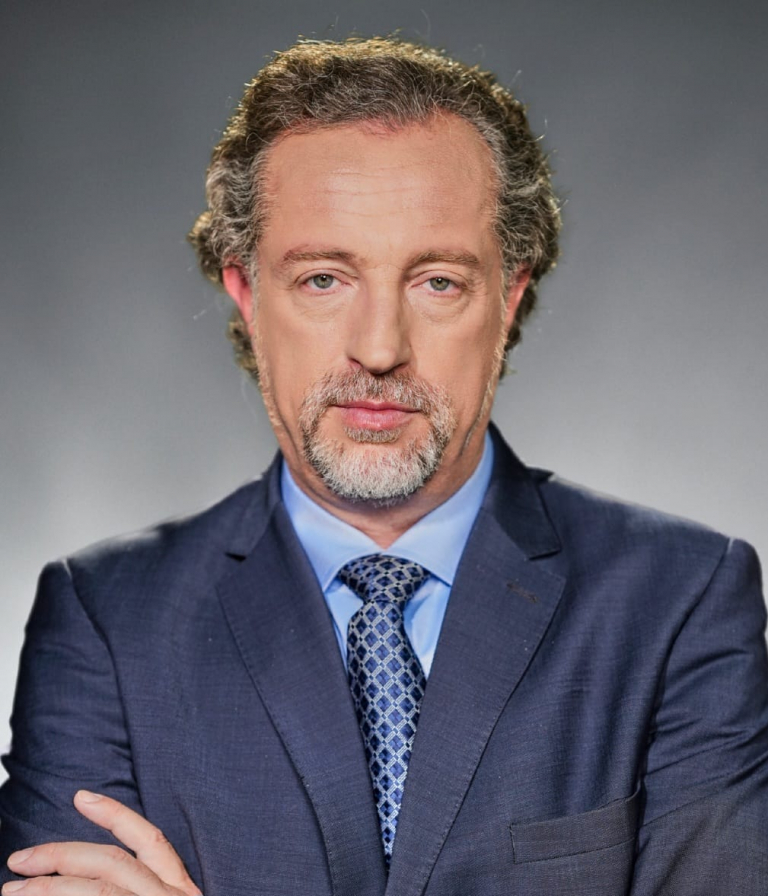
- Official portrait, 2026

Deputy Prime Minister of Bulgaria
- Incumbent
- Assumed office 8 May 2026 Serving with Galab Donev, Atanas Pekanov and Aleksandur Pulev
- Prime Minister: Rumen Radev

Member of the European Parliament for Bulgaria
- In office 2 July 2019 – 15 July 2024

Personal details
- Born: 8 October 1970 (age 56) Istanbul, Turkey
- Party: PB (since 2026)
- Other political affiliations: BSP (until 2026)
- Education: Sofia University
- Occupation: Journalist • Translator • Politician

Ivo Hristov (Bulgarian: Иво Христов Петков, born 8 October 1970) is a Bulgarian politician who is a Deputy Prime Minister of Bulgaria since May 2026. He previously served as a Member of the European Parliament from 2019 to 2024. In 2022, he joined the Committee of Inquiry to investigate the use of Pegasus and equivalent surveillance spyware.
