= St. Nikolai, Varna =

Coordinates: 43°13′N 27°55′E

The end pier of Varna's harbour, Varna, Bulgaria.

Saint Nicholai's icon (Holy image) labels the light house at the tip of the outskirt pier of the Port of Varna. Saint Nicholai (see also Saint Nicholas) is patron saint of sailors, fishermen, ships and sailing. In centuries of Greek folklore, Nicholas was seen as "The Lord of the Sea", often described by modern Greek scholars as a kind of Christianised version of Poseidon (after the advent of Christianity).

== Historical leads ==
- St. Nicholas of Myra
- St. Nicholas tomb in Myra and Normans' domination in sea
- St. Nicholas born in Turkey and become bishop of Myra
- The Church of St. Nicholas (Aya Nicola Kilisesi), (also ancient Myra - port of Adriake, Demre River)
- The Church of St. Nicholas in Demre (about 50 km or 30 miles from Kaṣ)
- In the First Crusade, year 1100, the Venetians on the way to Jaffa steal the body of St. Nicholas from a monastery
- 'War of relics' - The importance of the cult of saints who specialized in the protection of maritime adventures in the creation of the Venetian self-image. Sailors from Bari managed to gain possession of some relics of St. Nicholas and returned to their city with them
- St. Nicholas (d. 350), Bishop of Myra in Lycia, one of the most popular Greek saints but also much venerated in the West. He is said to have been imprisoned by Diocletian but afterwards released. He is known for his good deeds. Justinian built the first church known to be dedicated to him, the church of Priscus and St. Nicholas, in Constantinople. The popularity of St. Nicholas caused the sailors of Bari to cross over to Myra to capture his remains from the infidel and rebury them in their native town, where they have since rested.
- St. Nicholas has been venerated in Germany since 12th century. St. Nicholas was 4th century Bishop of Myra in Asia Minor, revered for his generosity and worshiped by sailors for miracles at sea in harbour. He also helped poor girls by providing their dowries. Hung by the fire to dry, stockings were miraculously filled with gold so the girls could marry. St. Nicholas is said to have brought back to life three children who had been murdered and stored as pickled meat in the house of a wicked butcher. The children carried out church duties thereafter and were rewarded with small gift on December 6. Thomas Nast (1840–1902), who came to America from Germany as a child created the white-bearded Santa Claus with a pack on his back, combining St. Nicholas and Knecht Ruprecht.

== See also ==
- St. Nikolai, Hamburg
