= Nikolay Sabev =

Bulgarian politician

Minister of Transport and Communications
- In office December 13, 2021 – 2 August 2022
- Preceded by: Hristo Aleksiev

Personal details
- Born: Николай Йорданов Събев; September 24, 1960 (age 65) Ruse, Bulgaria
- Occupation: politician

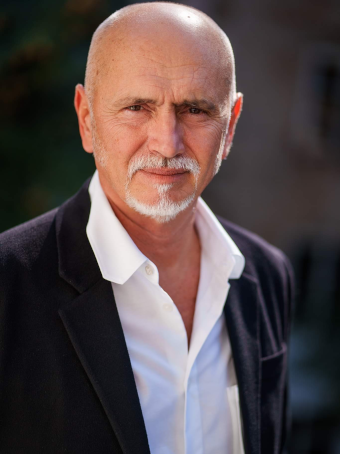
Nikolay Yordanov Sabev

Nikolay Yordanov Sabev (Bulgarian: Николай Йорданов Събев, born September 24, 1960, in Ruse) is a Bulgarian businessman and politician. He was minister of transport and communications in the Petkov government.

== Curriculum vitae ==
Sabev is a graduate of the operation and management of the fleet and ports at the Nikola Vaptsarov Naval Academy in Varna. He also graduated in economics and transport management at the University of National and World Economy in Sofia. He worked for ten years in a river shipping company. In the first half of the 1990s, he started running his own business, founded the Ekont Trans (1993) shipping company and the Ekont Ekspres (1997) courier company, which became the largest company of this type in Bulgaria. Later, he withdrew from day-to-day management and in 2018 he moved to Sofia, where he set up a business laboratory.

In 2021, he joined the group We Continue the Change, founded by Kiril Petkov and Assen Vassilev. In November of that year, on his behalf, he was elected a representative to the National Assembly of the 47th term.

In December 2021, he was appointed Minister of Transport and Communications in the newly formed government of Kiril Petkov.
