= Petkov Government =

Government of Bulgaria (2021–2022)

- 99th Cabinet of Bulgaria
- 2021–2022
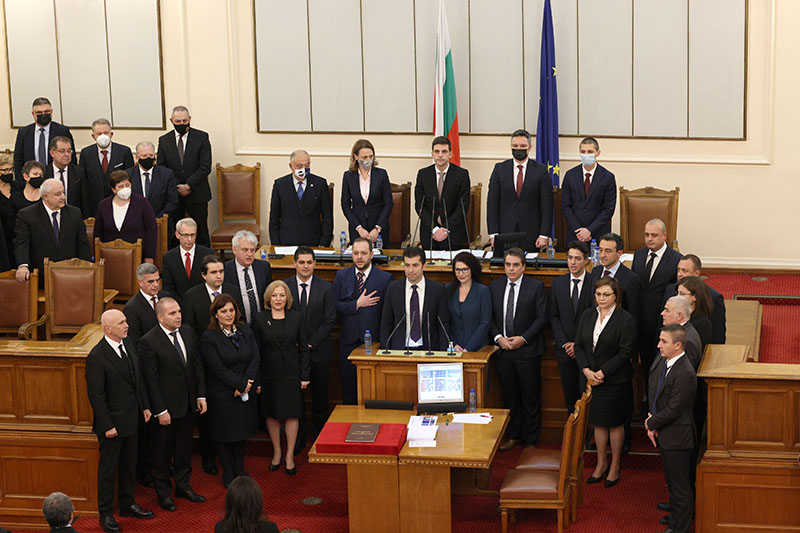
- The government takes the oath in the National Assembly
- Date formed: 13 December 2021
- Date dissolved: 2 August 2022

People and organisations
- President: Rumen Radev
- Prime Minister: Kiril Petkov
- Deputy Prime Ministers: Assen Vassilev, PP; Kalina Konstantinova, PP; Korneliya Ninova, BSP; Grozdan Karadzhov, ITN; Borislav Sandov, DB
- No. of ministers: 21
- Member parties: We Continue the Change (PP); BSP for Bulgaria (BSP); There Is Such a People (ITN) (Note: There Is Such a People (ITN) pulled out of the coalition on 8 June 2022); Democratic Bulgaria (DB)
- Status in legislature: Majority (coalition); Minority coalition (from 8 June 2022)
- Opposition parties: GERB–SDS; DPS; ITN (from 8 June); Revival

History
- Election: November 2021
- Legislature term: 47th National Assembly
- Predecessor: Second Yanev Government
- Successor: First Donev Government

The Petkov Government, known as the Four-party coalition cabinet, was the ninety-ninth cabinet of Bulgaria. Chaired by prime minister Kiril Petkov, it was approved by the National Assembly on 13 December 2021 after the government formation as a result of the November 2021 parliamentary election. It was a Vivaldi coalition. The government became a Minority government on 8 June 2022, when ITN pulled out of the government, and its mandate ended in late June 2022. It was the first government in modern Bulgarian history to lose a vote of confidence. On 1 July, Bulgarian President Rumen Radev asked Assen Vassilev to form a new government, which Vassilev failed to do and new elections were scheduled to take place.

== Cabinet ==
Portfolio	Minister	Took office	Left office	Party
Prime Minister	Kiril Petkov	13 December 2021	2 August 2022	PP
Deputy Prime Minister for EU funds Minister of Finance	Assen Vassilev	13 December 2021	2 August 2022	PP
Deputy Prime Minister for Good Governance	Kalina Konstantinova	13 December 2021	2 August 2022	PP
Deputy Prime Minister for Economy and Industry; Minister of Economy and Industry	Korneliya Ninova	13 December 2021	2 August 2022	BSPzB
Deputy Prime Minister for Regional Development and Public Works; Minister of Regional Development and Public Works	Grozdan Karadjov (Note: Proposed by ITN)	13 December 2021	2 August 2022	Independent
Deputy Prime Minister for Climate Policies; Minister of Environment and Water	Borislav Sandov	13 December 2021	2 August 2022	DB
Minister of Education and Science	Nikolai Denkov (Note: Proposed by PP)	13 December 2021	2 August 2022	Independent
Minister of Interior	Boyko Rashkov	13 December 2021	2 August 2022	Independent
Minister of Defense	Stefan Yanev	13 December 2021	1 March 2022	Independent
Minister of Defense	Dragomir Zakov	1 March 2022	2 August 2022	PP
Minister of Health	Asena Serbezova	13 December 2021	2 August 2022	PP
Minister of Transport and Communications	Nikolai Sabev	13 December 2021	2 August 2022	PP
Minister of Innovation and Growth	Daniel Lorer	13 December 2021	2 August 2022	PP
Minister of Culture	Atanas Atanasov	13 December 2021	2 August 2022	PP
Minister of Labour and Social Policy	Georgi Gyokov	13 December 2021	2 August 2022	BSPzB
Minister of Agriculture	Ivan Ivanov	13 December 2021	2 August 2022	BSPzB
Minister of Tourism	Hristo Prodanov	13 December 2021	2 August 2022	BSPzB
Minister of Foreign Affairs	Teodora Genchovska	13 December 2021	2 August 2022	ITN
Minister of Energy	Alexander Nikolov	13 December 2021	2 August 2022	ITN
Minister of Youth and Sports	Radostin Vasilev	13 December 2021	2 August 2022	ITN
Minister of Justice	Nadezhda Yordanova	13 December 2021	2 August 2022	DB
Minister of Electronic Governance	Bozhidar Bozhanov	13 December 2021	2 August 2022	DB

=== Changes ===
==== From 1 March 2022 ====
On 1 March 2022 the defence minister Stefan Yanev resigned, and his resignation was approved by the National Assembly. Dragomir Zakov was appointed as the new defence minister.

==== From June 2022 ====
On 8 June the leader of ITN Slavi Trifonov aired a television announcement that his party is leaving the coalition, and thus turning the Petkov Government into a minority government.

== Removal ==
After ITN left the government, GERB tabled a vote of no confidence in the government, which was scheduled for 22 June 2022. 6 ITN deputies left the party to support the government. Several rallies in support of the government, as well as protests against it were held in the days coming up to the vote.

On 22 June, the vote was held, with 123 votes against the government and 116 for it. All three remaining parties in the coalition, the six ITN defectors, and by mistake one DPS MP voted for the government, with all other MPs voting against it.
