= Assena Serbezova =

Bulgarian politician

Asena Serbezova
- Асена Сербезова
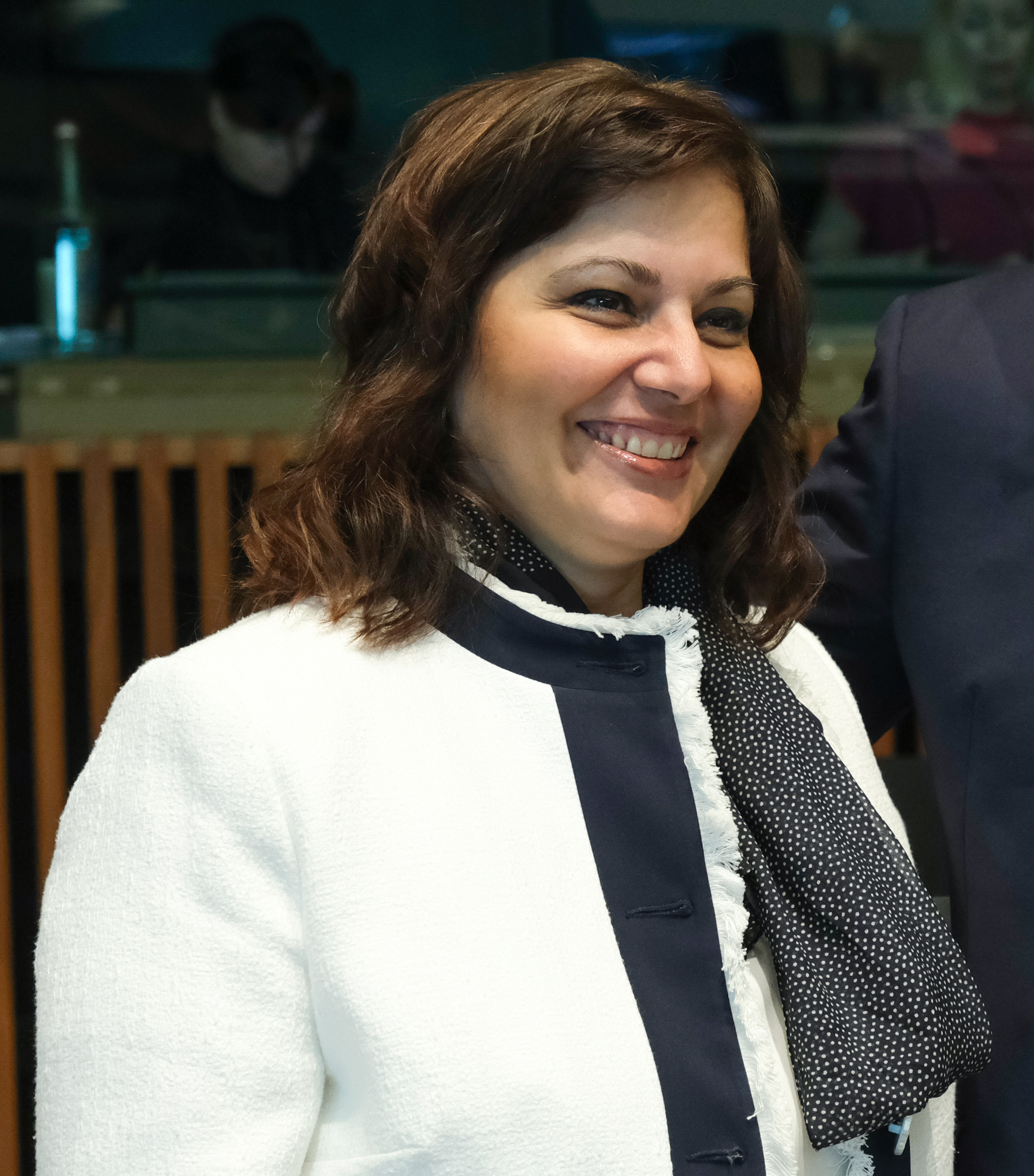
- Asena Serbezova in 2022

Minister of Health
- In office 13 December 2021 – 2 August 2022
- Preceded by: Stoicho Katsarov
- Succeeded by: Asen Medzhidiev

Personal details
- Born: 30 March 1973 (age 52)
- Children: 2
- Occupation: politician

Asena Serbezova (Cyrillic script: Асена Сербезова, born 30 March 1973) is a Bulgarian pharmacist and university teacher, minister of health under the government of Kiril Petkov from 2021 to 2022.

== Biography ==
In 1996, she graduated in pharmacy from the Medical University of Sofia. She obtained a master's degree in health service organization at her alma mater, health policy and pharmacoeconomics at Pompeu Fabra University and psychology at the Veliko Tarnovo University. Saints Cyril and Methodius. Professionally associated with the pharmaceutical industry, she worked in drug distribution companies and in institutions responsible for clinical trials. As an academic teacher associated with the Medical University of Sofia, where she took a professorship. She was chairman of the quality committee of the Bulgarian pharmaceutical association BFS (2007–2010) and vice-chairman of that organization (2010–2013). From 2014 to 2018, she was the executive director of the Medicines Executive Agency at the Minister of Health, and was also a member of the management of the European Medicines Agency. In 2020, elected president of the BFS.

In December 2021, on the recommendation of the group We Continue the Change, she took the position of health minister in the newly formed government of Kiril Petkov.
