= Irina Shtonova =

Bulgarian economist and politician

- Ирина Щонова
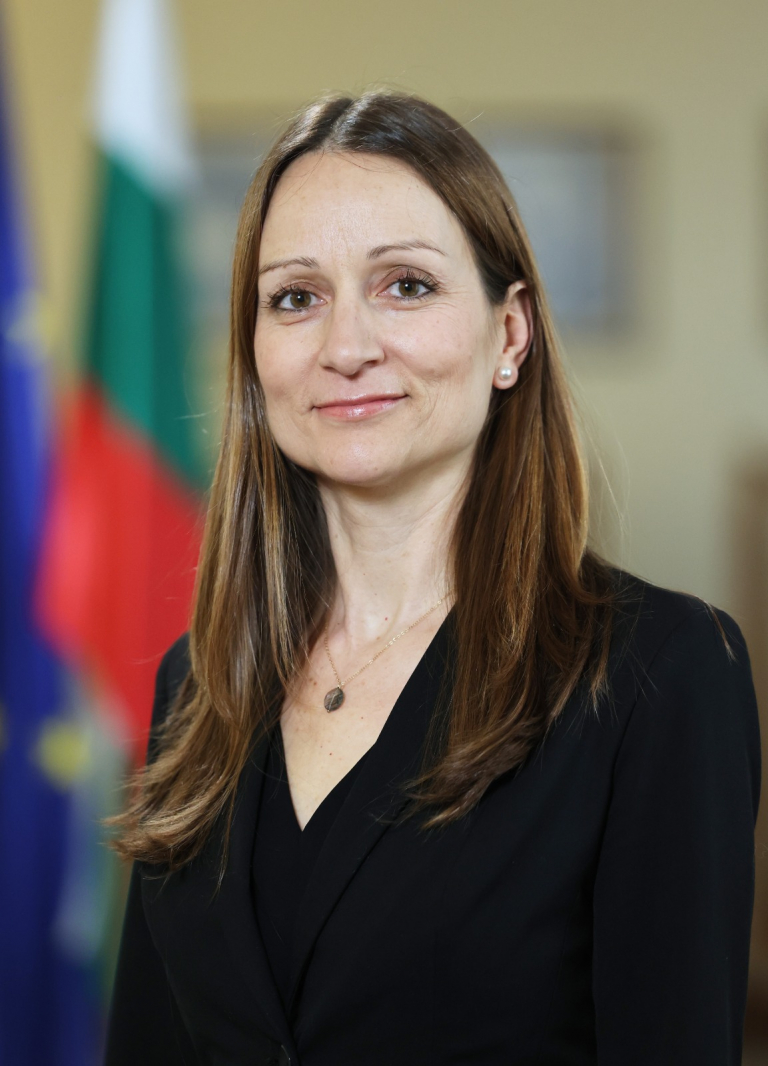
- Shtonova in 2026

Acting Minister of Economy and Industry
- In office 19 February 2026 – 8 May 2026
- Prime Minister: Andrey Gyurov
- Preceded by: Petar Dilov
- Succeeded by: Aleksandar Pulev

Personal details
- Education: Stanford University; University of Sofia; St. Olaf College

Irina Rumenova Shtonova (Bulgarian: Ирина Руменова Щонова) is a Bulgarian economist and politician. She served as the acting Minister of Economy and Industry of Bulgaria in 2026. She previously served as Deputy Minister of Economy and Industry between 2022 and 2024.

== Education ==
Shtonova got a degree in economics from St. Olaf College in the United States and a master's degree in business administration from Stanford University, before going on to obtain a PhD in economics from Sofia University.

== Career ==
She has spent her professional career as a manager in large companies such as McKinsey & Company in Bulgaria. She has also worked in several American telecommunications companies as vice president of marketing and strategy at AT&T and as a director at DirecTV. Between August 2022 and April 2024, she served as Deputy Minister of Economy and Industry.

On 18 February 2026 Shtonova was announced as the new Minister of Economy and Industry of the caretaker cabinet of Prime Minister Andrey Gyurov and was sworn in on 19 February 2026. She stated that one of her main objectives was to develop measures to curb price increases.
