= Deputy Prime Minister of Bulgaria =

Deputy Head of Government of Bulgaria

- Заместник министър-председател на България

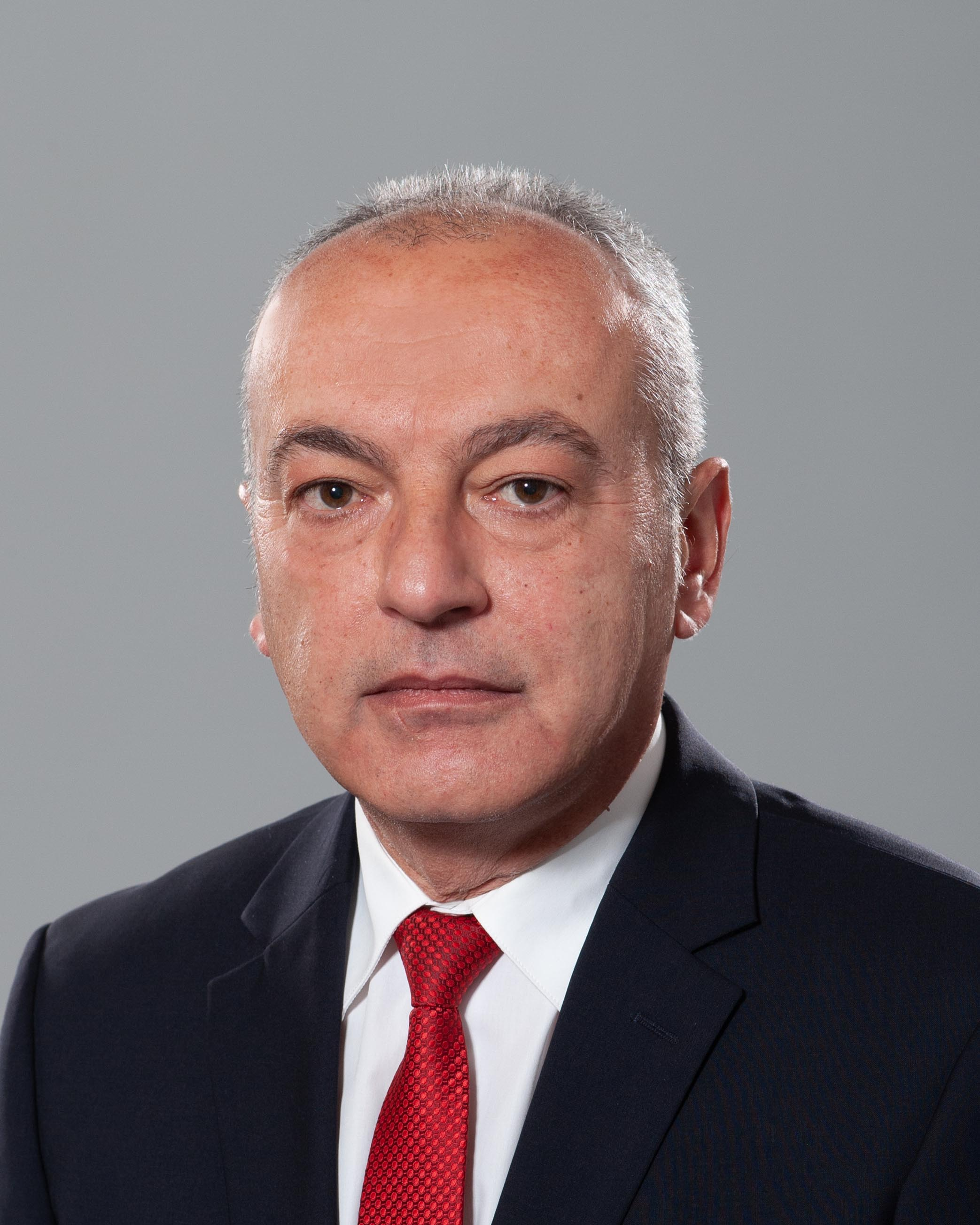
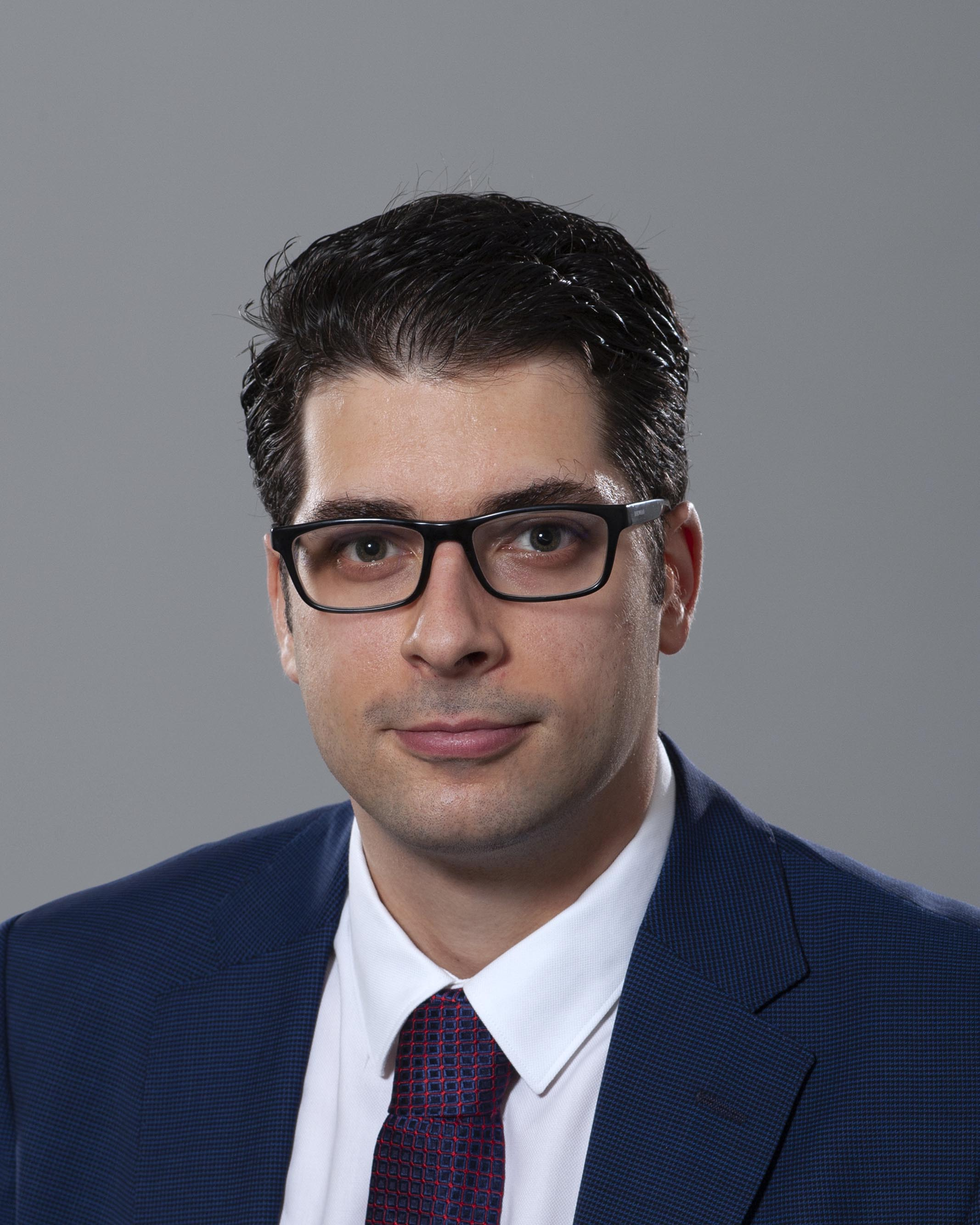
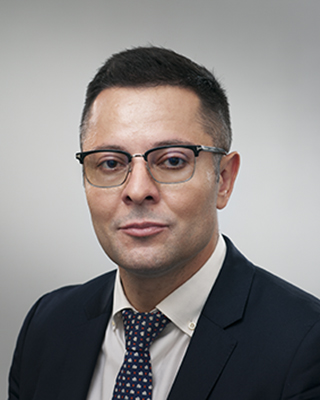
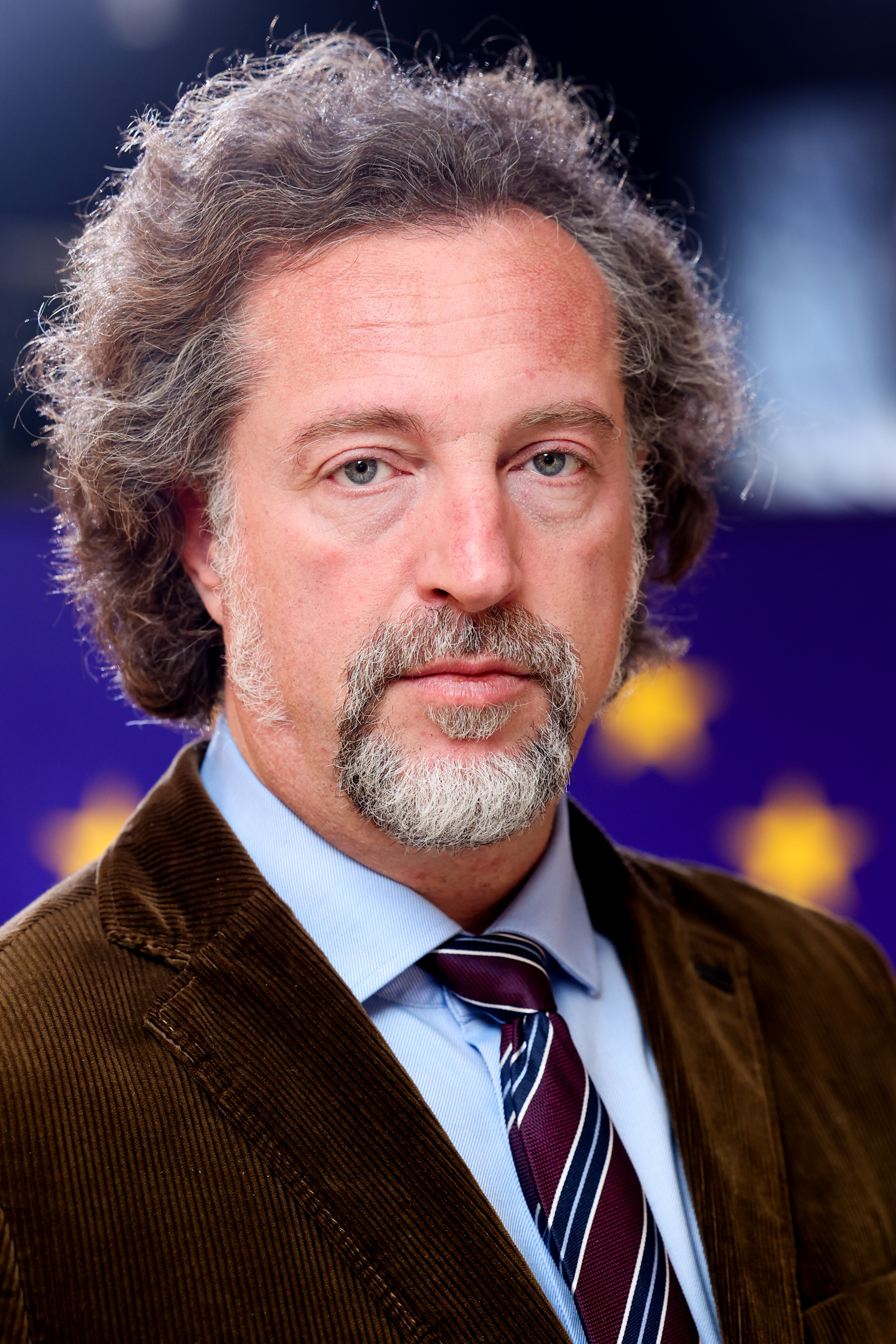
- Incumbent; Galab Donev, Atanas Pekanov, Aleksandur Pulev and Ivo Hristov since 8 May 2026
- Member of: Government of Bulgaria
- Reports to: Prime Minister
- Appointer: National Assembly of Bulgaria
- Term length: 4 years, renewable
- Formation: 1946
- First holder: Traicho Kostov
- Salary: €4,600 per month
- Website: www.government.bg

The Deputy Prime Minister of Bulgaria (Bulgarian: Заместник министър-председател на България) is the deputy of the Prime Minister of Bulgaria and a member of the Government of Bulgaria. They can also be one of the Ministers of Bulgaria. The position is oftentimes held by multiple people at once. The current Deputy Prime Ministers are Galab Donev, Atanas Pekanov, Aleksandur Pulev and Ivo Hristov.

== See also ==
- Government of Bulgaria
- History of Bulgaria
- Politics of Bulgaria
- List of Bulgarian monarchs
- List of heads of the state of Bulgaria
- List of presidents of Bulgaria (1990–present)
