= Razdelna, Varna Province =

Razdelna Разделна
- Village
- Location in Bulgaria
- Coordinates: 43.161°N 27.635°E
- Country: Bulgaria
- Province: Varna Province
- Municipality: Beloslav Municipality

Population (2015-09-15)
  - Total: 524
- Postal code: 9181

View of Petrich Kale near Razdelna, Varna Province, Bulgaria.

Razdelna (Bulgarian: Разделна) is a village in Beloslav Municipality, Varna Province, north-eastern Bulgaria.

As of September 2015 the village had a population of 524.
