= Haskovo Municipality =

Haskovo Municipality Община Хасково
- Municipality
- Location within Bulgaria
- Coordinates: 41°56′N 25°34′E
- Country: Bulgaria
- Province: Haskovo
- Municipality: Haskovo

Area
  - Total: 739.8 km^{2} (285.6 sq mi)

Population (1-Feb-2011)
  - Total: 94,156
  - Density: 127.3/km^{2} (329.6/sq mi)
- Time zone: UTC+2 (EET)
  - Summer (DST): UTC+3 (EEST)
- Website: www.haskovo.bg

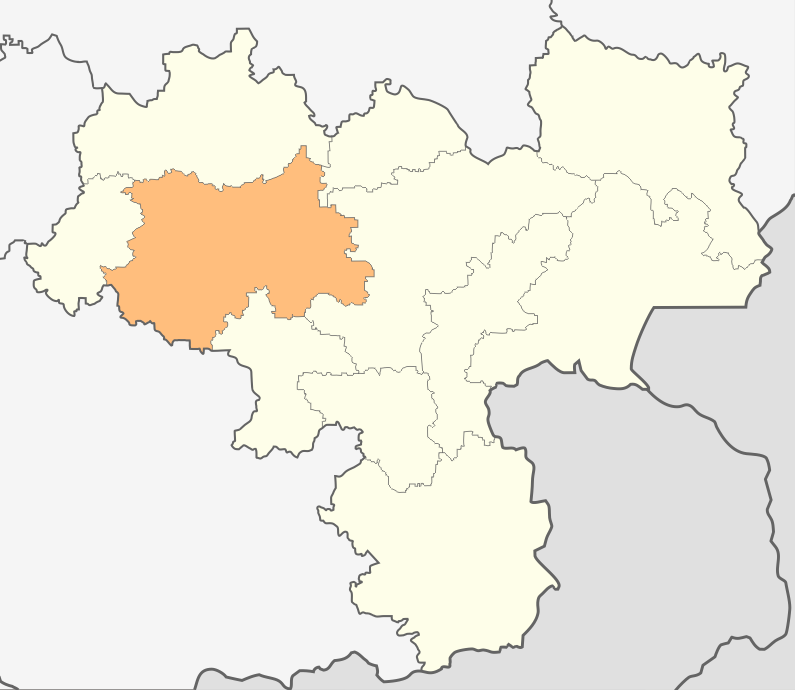
Haskovo municipality within Haskovo Province

Haskovo Municipality is a municipality in Haskovo Province, Bulgaria. The administrative centre is Haskovo.

== Demography ==
=== Religion ===
According to the latest Bulgarian census of 2011, the religious composition, among those who answered the optional question on religious identification, was the following:

Religious composition of Haskovo Municipality
Orthodox Christianity	71.2%
Catholicism	0.3%
Protestantism	0.8%
Islam	18.2%
No religion	2.5%
Prefer not to answer, others and indefinable	7.0%
