= Ministry of Innovation and Growth =

- Министерство на иновациите и растежа

Agency overview
- Formed: 2021
- Jurisdiction: Government of Bulgaria
- Headquarters: Knyaz Aleksandar I Street 12, Sofia
- Annual budget: 22 Million leva (2022)
- Minister responsible: Irena Mladenova
- Website: www.mig.government.bg

The Ministry of Innovation and Growth of Bulgaria (Bulgarian: Министерство на иновациите и растежа Ministerstvo na inovatsiite i rastezha) is a government institution in the country as part of the Government of Bulgaria. It is also the newest ministry in the country, established alongside the Petkov Government in 2021.

== History ==
The department was established on 13 December 2021 with the inauguration of the Petkov Government by the newly elected National Assembly. Under its jurisdiction are structures such as the European Funds for Competitiveness, the Bulgarian Development Bank, the Bulgarian Investment Agency and the Executive Agency for the Promotion of Small and Medium Enterprises.

== List of ministers ==
No.	Name (Birth–Death)	Portrait	Took office	Left office	Political party	Government
1	Daniel Lorer (1976-)		13 December 2021	2 August 2022	We Continue the Change	Petkov Government
2	Aleksandur Pulev (1981-)		2 August 2022	6 June 2023	Independent	First Donev Government; Second Donev Government
3	Milena Stoycheva (1977-)		6 June 2023	9 April 2024	Independent	Denkov Government
4	Rosen Karadimov (1963-)		9 April 2024	16 January 2025	Independent	Glavchev Government
