= Ezerovo, Varna Province =

Ezerovo Езерово
- Village
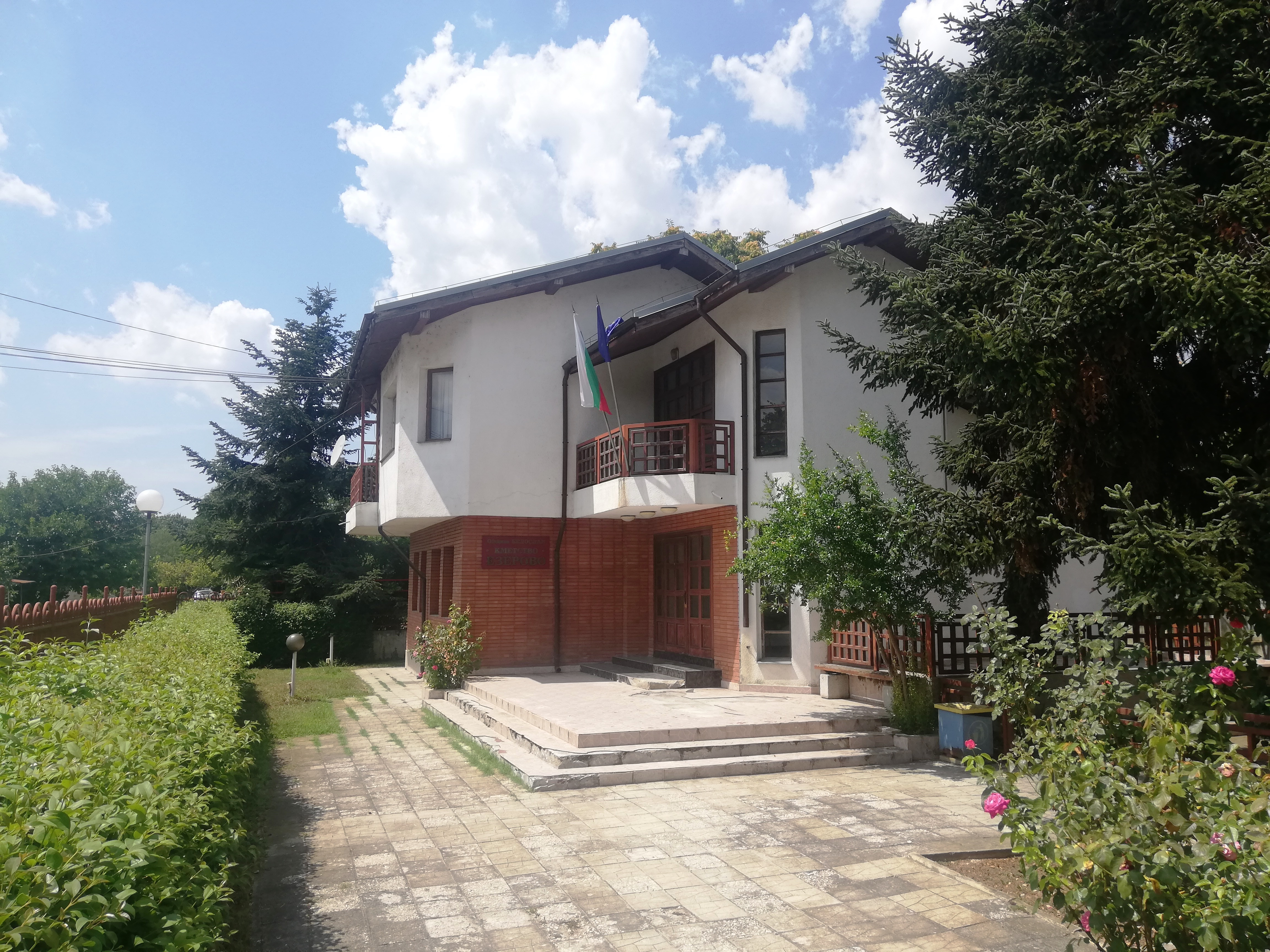
- Village hall

- Location within Bulgaria
- Coordinates: 43°12′N 27°46′E
- Country: Bulgaria
- Province: Varna Province
- Municipality: Beloslav Municipality

Area
  - Total: 9.299 km^{2} (3.590 sq mi)
- Elevation: 12 m (39 ft)

Population (2021)
  - Total: 1,544
- Time zone: UTC+2 (EET)
  - Summer (DST): UTC+3 (EEST)
- Postal code: 9168

Ezerovo (Bulgarian: Езерово) is a village in Beloslav Municipality, Varna Province, north-eastern Bulgaria. It is the largest village in the municipality. The village is situated at an elevation of 12 metres in the Varna Lowland, on the western shore of Lake Varna and approximately 10 km (6.2 mi) west of Varna. Its former name was Malak Aladŭn (Малък Аладън). The village borders the territories of Topoli to the east, Ignatjevo to the north, Strashimirovo to the west, and Konstantinovo to the south, across Lake Varna.

== History ==
The village bore the name Malak Aladŭn until the first half of the 20th century. Between 1895 and 1906, at the end of Lake Varna before its connection with Lake Beloslav, a stone quarry called "Malak Aladŭn" was built near the village, together with a railway station. They carried out the extraction and transport of stone materials needed for the various structures during the construction of the Port of Varna. According to Karel Škorpil, some of the stones were extracted from a surviving Roman structure whose foundations contained large worked stone blocks. According to interpretations of these findings, the extraction was carried out from the so-called Justinianic fortress, known as Theodoriada.

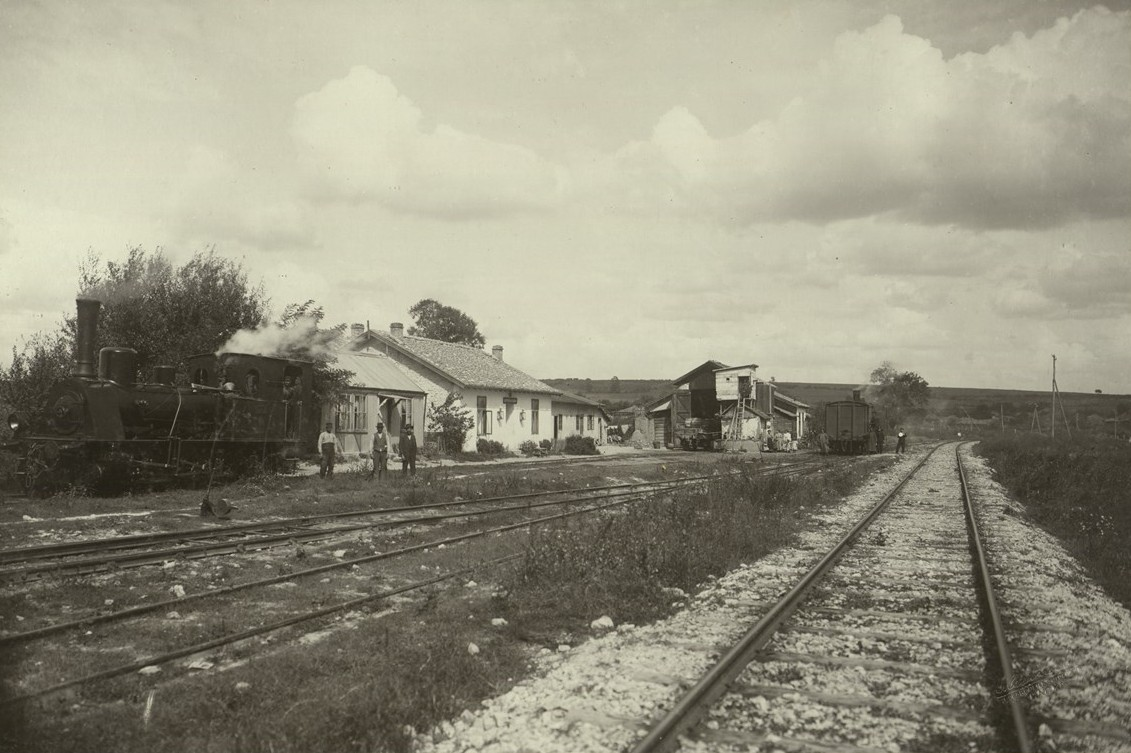
The railway station for stone blocks at the quarry, c. 1900

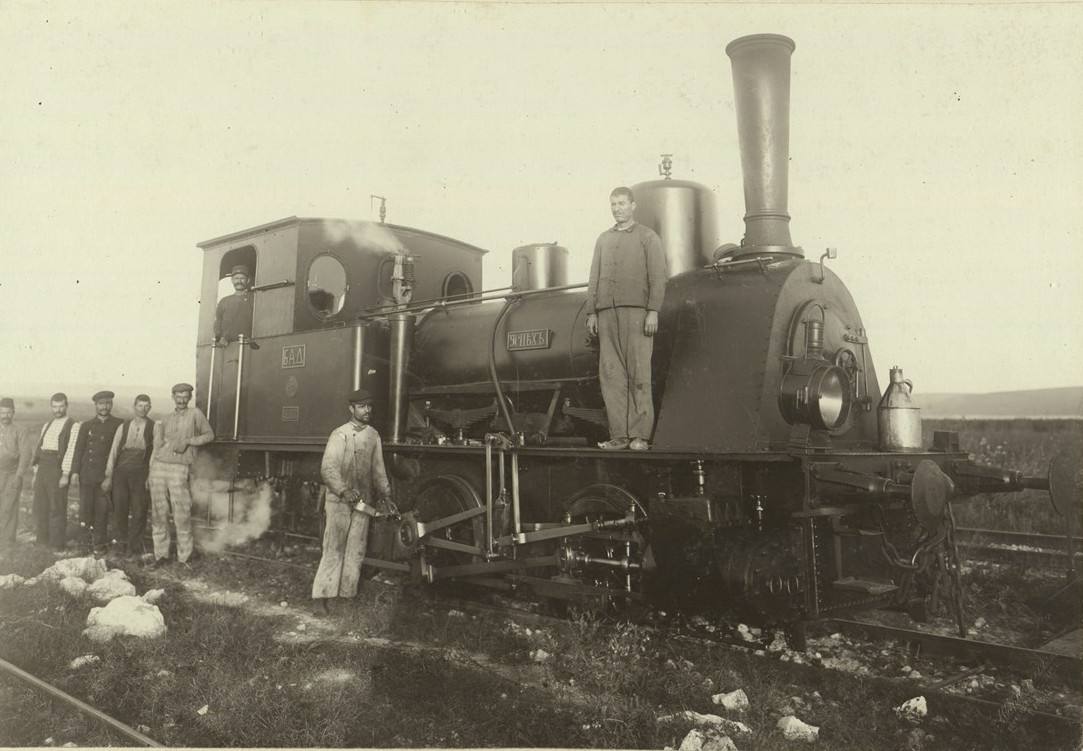
Workers with the locomotive Uspeh (Success) for manoeuvring in the quarry

== Population ==
As of September 2015 the village has a population of 1843.

Population of Ezerovo according to census data:

Historical population

Year	Pop.	±%
1934	350	—
1946	238	−32.0%
1956	284	+19.3%
1965	693	+144.0%
1975	1,931	+178.6%

Year	Pop.	±%
1985	1,595	−17.4%
1992	1,643	+3.0%
2001	1,666	+1.4%
2011	1,771	+6.3%
2021	1,544	−12.8%

=== Ethnic composition ===
Population by ethnic group according to the 2011 census:

	Population	Share (%)
Total	1,771	100.00
Bulgarians	876	49.46
Turks	622	35.12
Roma	—	—
Others	—	—
Not self-identified	—	—
Did not respond	259	14.62

== Economy ==
Several enterprises operate in the village, including ТЕЦ Варна (Varna Thermal Power Plant), Energoremont Varna, the MTG Delfin shipyard, and various construction and industrial companies.

== Infrastructure ==
Railway line 2 (Sofia–Varna) passes through Ezerovo, which has both a stop east of the village and a station to the west, near the Varna Thermal Power Plant. Ezerovo and Somovit (Pleven Province) are the only villages in Bulgaria with both a railway station and a port. Republican road III-2008, which follows the northern shore of Lake Varna from Devnya to Varna, also passes through the village.

The village has one school, the Ss. Cyril and Methodius primary school.

== Culture ==
Ezerovo, the largest village in Beloslav Municipality, has an active church, a mosque, and a community centre (chitalishte).

The church is dedicated to St. George the Victorious, and accordingly St. George's Day is the village's feast day. The church was consecrated in 1997; it was originally planned to be dedicated to the Forty Martyrs of Sebaste, but at the insistence of the residents, St. George the Victorious was chosen as patron.

Construction of the mosque began in 2002. The mosque has been in active use since 2016.

The community centre "Iskra" was founded in 1936. It currently operates a children's dance ensemble, a folklore group, and a museum collection.

== Notable people ==
- Aleksandar Mutafchiyski (born 1972), artist-soloist at the Stefan Makedonski Musical Theatre, Sofia

== See also ==
- Port of Varna
