= Strashimirovo =

Strashimirovo Страшимирово
- Village
- Location in Bulgaria
- Coordinates: 43.195°N 27.735°E
- Country: Bulgaria
- Province: Varna Province
- Municipality: Beloslav Municipality

Population (2015-09-15)
  - Total: 946
- Postal code: 9179

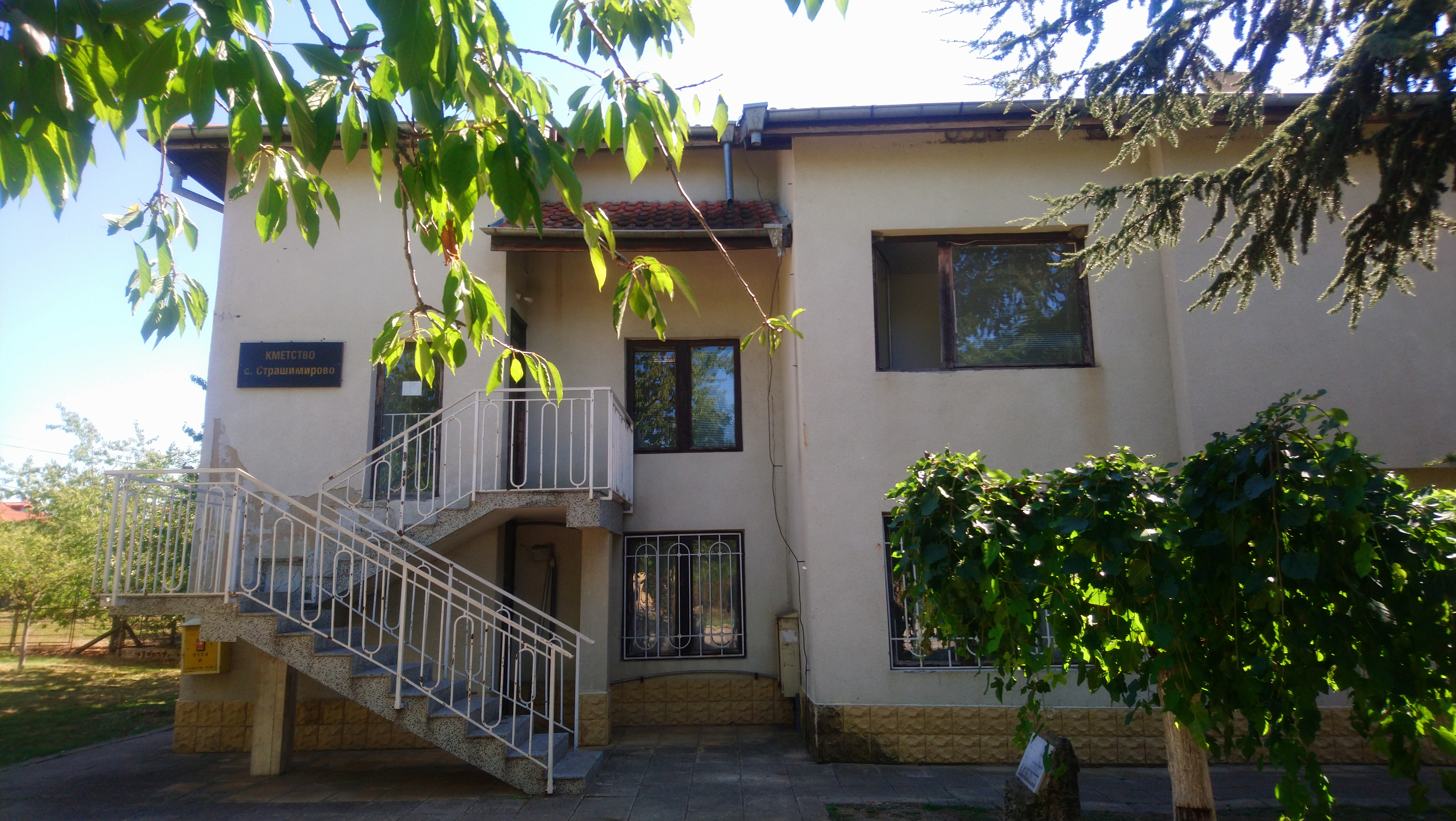
The Town Hall of the village of Strashimirovo, Beloslav Municipality

Strashimirovo (Bulgarian: Страшимирово) is a village in north-eastern Bulgaria. It is located in the municipality of Beloslav, Varna Province.

As of September 2015 the village has a population of 946.
