= Commission for Protection against Discrimination =

National equality body of Bulgaria

Commission for Protection against Discrimination (CPD)
- Formation: 2005
- Location: Sofia, Bulgaria
- Chairperson: Anna Jumalieva
- Website: www.KZD-NonDiscrimination.com

Commission for Protection against Discrimination (CPD; Bulgarian: Комисия за защита от дискриминация, romanized: Komisiya za zashtita ot diskriminatsiya, KZD) is the national equality body of Bulgaria. It was created in April 2005 under the Law for Protection against Discrimination with a main objective “to prevent discrimination, to protect against discrimination and to ensure equal opportunities”. The Commission functions in compliance with the Paris Principles and issues legally binding decisions. It can impose fines and compulsory administrative measures.

CPD is member of Equinet and holds class B accreditation by International Coordinating Committee of National Human Rights Institutions.
