= Port of Varna =

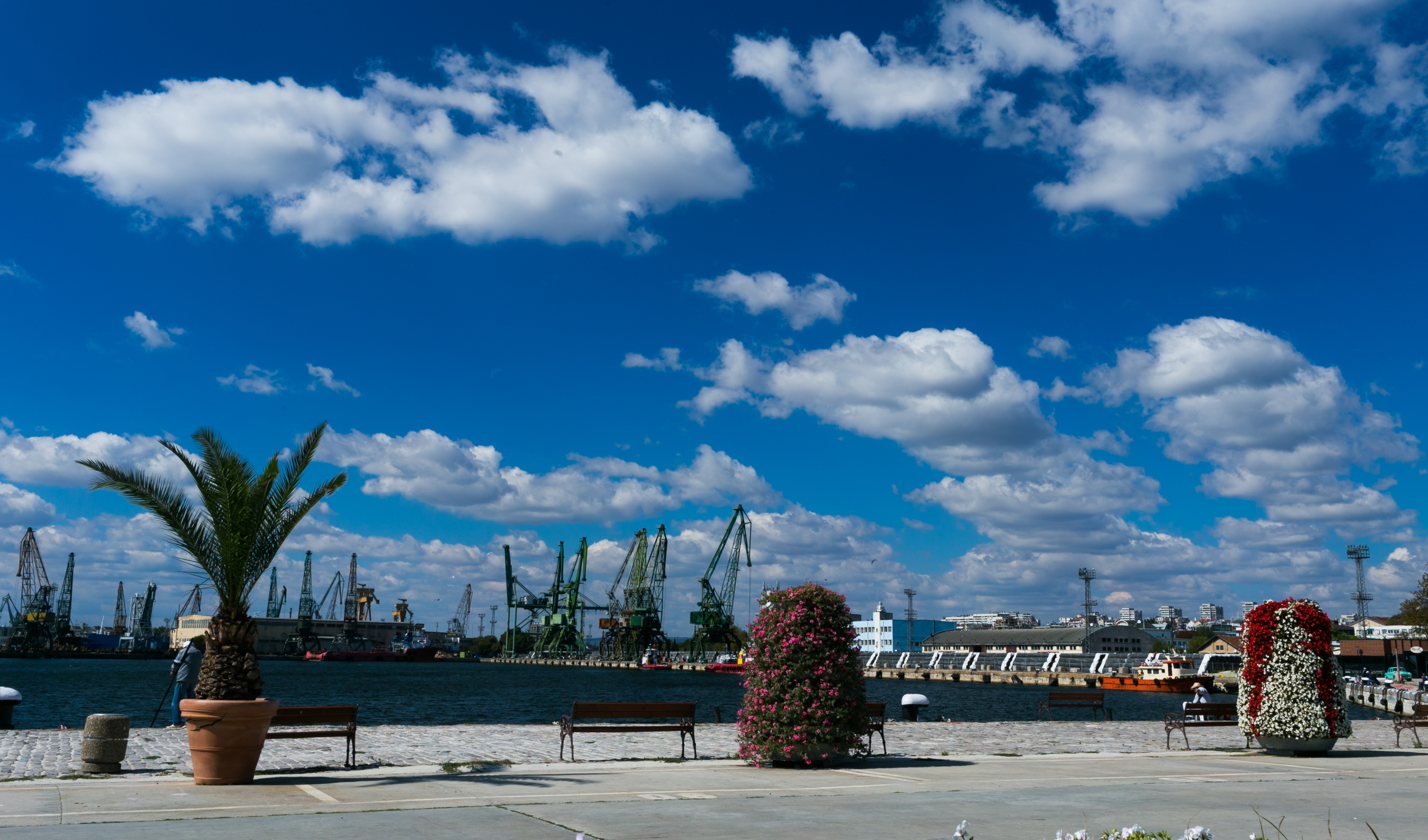
- Port of Varna
- Interactive map of Port of Varna

Location
- Country: Bulgaria
- Location: Varna
- Coordinates: 43°11′32″N 27°54′26″E
- UN/LOCODE: BGVAR

Details
- Opened: 1906 (Varna-East), 1976 (Varna-West)
- Type of Harbor: Natural/Artificial
- No. of berths: freight: 19 (Varna-West), 13 (Varna-East); passenger: 1 (Varna-East)
- max. draft: 11.2 m (Varna-West), 11.5 m (Varna-East)
- max. air-draft: 41.5 m. (Varna-West), unlimited (Varna-East)

Statistics
- Annual cargo tonnage: 7,100,000 tonnes (2020)
- Annual container volume: 160,000 TEU's (Varna-West, 2018)
- Annual revenue: EUR 26 million (2020)
- Website; Port-Varna.bg

Port of Varna (Bulgarian: Пристанище Варна, Pristanishte Varna) (map) is the largest seaport complex in Bulgaria. Located on the Black Sea's west coast on Varna Bay, along Lake Varna and Lake Beloslav, it also comprises the outlying port of Balchik. It has a significant further development potential with 44 km (27 mi) of sheltered inland waterfront on the lakes alone, easily accessible by road and railroad and adjacent to Varna International Airport.

== Overview ==
There are two anchorages at Varna roadstead: summer and winter. If violent northeasterly wind and wave conditions make the anchorages hazardous, a foul weather anchorage is available west of the 70 m (230 ft) high Cape Kaliakra 26 nautical miles (48 km) east-northeast of Varna.

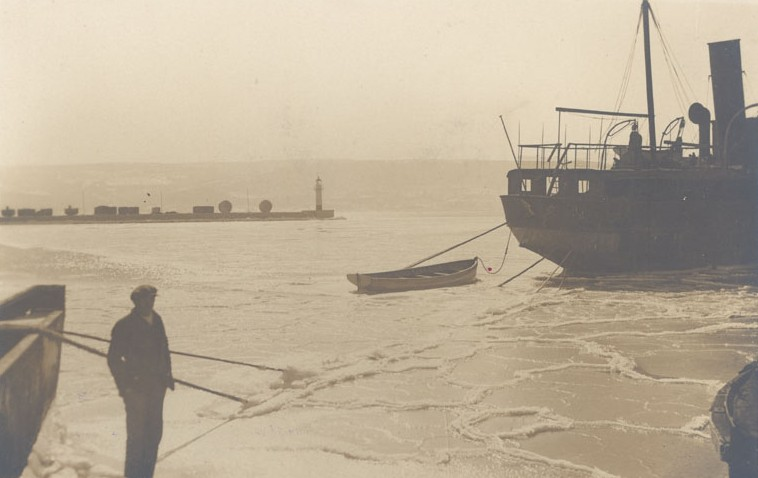
Frozen sea in Varna (1929)

Two inland canals connect the sea and Port of Varna East with Lake Varna, Lake Beloslav and Port of Varna West: Channel 1 with draft 11.5 m and Channel 2 with draft 11.0 m. The canals form an island (Острова) on which a deepwater oil terminal, among other port facilities, is currently located. The depths of the ship berths and the approaches allow the handling of vessels of capacity up to 50,000 gross tons. In view of the stated safe canal depths, only vessels of draft less than 9.9 m (32 1/2 ft) and aircraft up to 46 m (151 ft) are allowed to Varna West. Vessels with load over 200 m, beam over 26 m, or over 20,000 gross tons are required to pass the channels during daylight hours only. The largest vessel handled (as of 2006) is the Norwegian Dream cruise ship (220 m in length, 50,700 gross tons).

Port of Varna offers full service: loading, discharging, stevedoring, freight forwarding, storage and various intermodal services.

East terminal

- 14 berths
- 2,345 m berth
- 97,600 m2 open storage
- 41,258 m2 covered storage

West terminal

- 22 berths
- 3,430 m berth
- 346,393 m2 open storage
- 37,806 m2 covered storage
- 10,000 m3 liquid storage

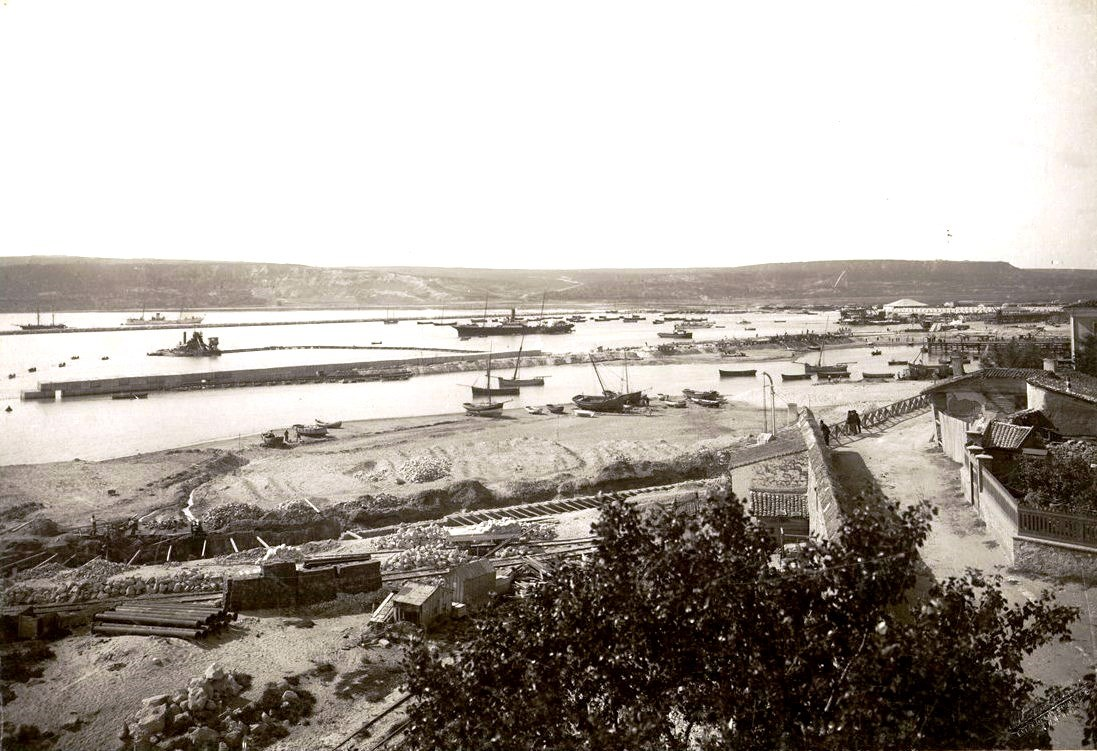
The port under construction (view south, around 1900)

It has a well-forked railway and road network. The existing port facilities allow the handling of practically all kinds of solid bulk, break-bulk, containerized and some liquid-bulk cargoes.

Principal exports include urea, soda ash, cement, clinker, silica, fertilisers, grain, containers and ro-ro. Principal imports are coal, metals, ores and ore concentrates, oil, phosphates, timber, molasses, containers and ro-ro.

Since 2006, Port of Varna serves as a hub for BP and German wind turbine manufacturer Saga.

In 2008, the port posted a 57% growth in overall tonnage handled, and at times in late summer it was stretched beyond capacity, due to redirected cargo from striking ports in the region and the year's record export of wheat from northeastern Bulgaria.

== Future plans ==
The updated general plan for the Port of Varna to 2020 was approved in 1999. Major projects for new construction, reconstruction and modernization include: a deepwater container terminal and a ro-ro terminal on the island under the Asparuhov most bridge, a grain terminal on the north shore of Lake Varna south of the Dry Port storage base, a liquid chemicals terminal and a cement and clinker terminal at Varna West, and modernization of the passenger and ro-ro terminals at Varna East.

In 2007, new plans were disclosed to relocate the container terminal from Varna East to a new larger basin on the northeastern shore of Lake Varna and to redevelop old port Varna East, located in the city centre, into a large marine attractions zone with a new cruise terminal, yacht marina, apartments, hotels, restaurants, museums, exhibitions, shopping, and other tourist facilities.

In 2008, plans were disclosed for another deepwater container terminal on the south side of the island for vessels carrying over 2500 twenty-foot equivalent units (TEU).

A liquified petroleum gas terminal is also being developed at Beloslav. Amidst the gas crisis of early 2009, discussions started of a new liquified natural gas terminal on 30 hectares (74 acres), possibly on the northwestern shore of Lake Varna at Ezerovo.

Also in 2008, discussions were resumed (suspended in 1981) for a 192 km long navigable canal Rousse–Varna connecting the lower river Danube with the Varna lakes and the Black Sea, but this enterprise is still considered economically unfeasible and utopian by many.

Other existing port terminals include the Cruise Terminal; Petrol, LesPort, and Varna Thermal Power Plant (handling oil, timber, and coal respectively); the Railroad Ferry Terminal, which is not part of the complex, is located on the south shore of Lake Beloslav opposite Varna West.

In June 2023 the European Investment Bank signed an agreement with Logistic Centre Varna EAD for a €50 million loan to co-finance a new grain terminal at the Black Sea port of Varna, expected to be operational in 2026.

== See also ==
- Varna
- St. Nikolai, Varna
- July Morning, a tradition among young Bulgarians that originated from Port of Varna
