= Ministry of Economy and Industry (Bulgaria) =

Government ministry of Bulgaria

- Министерство на икономиката и индустрията
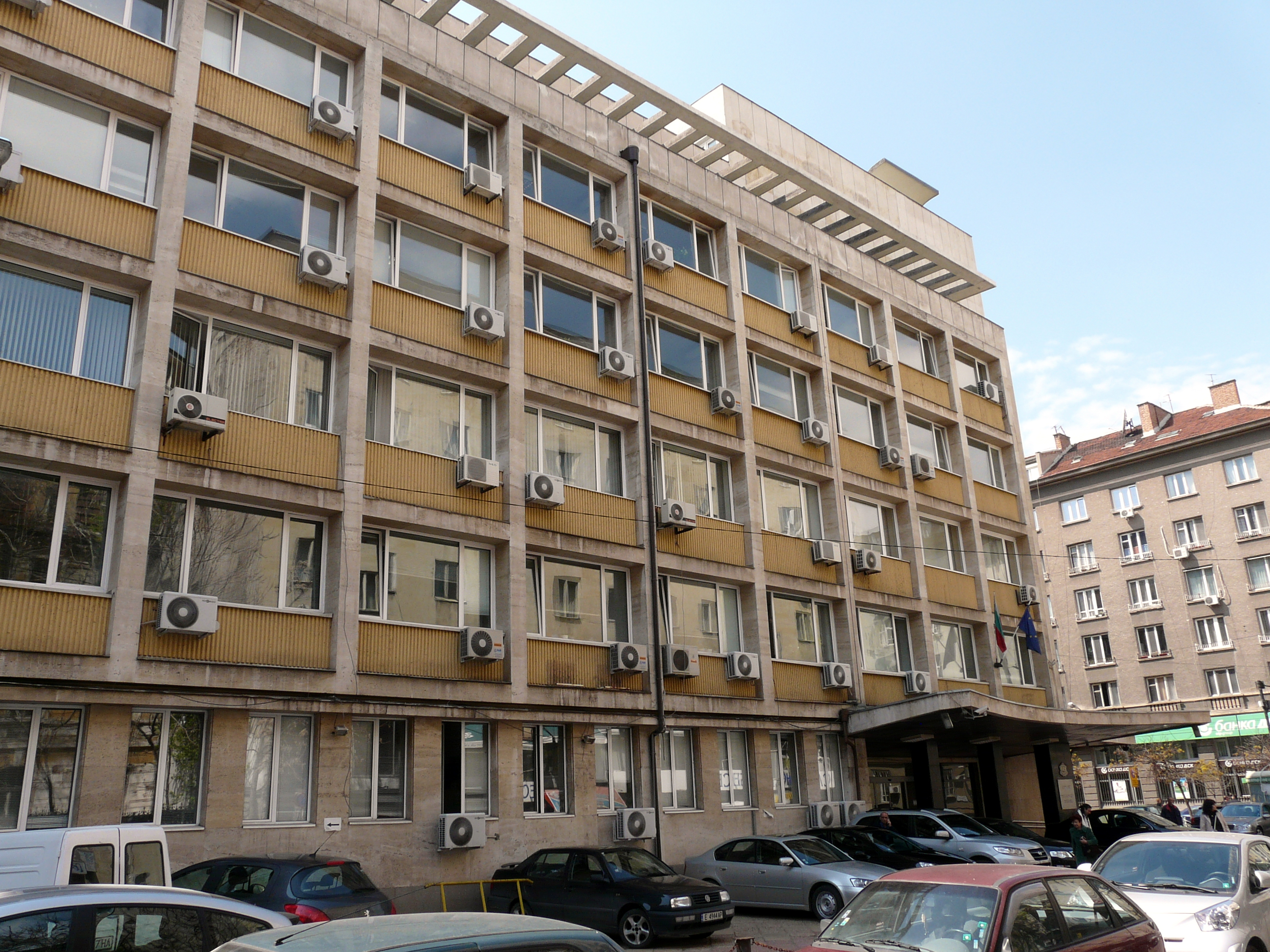
- Building of the Ministry

Agency overview
- Formed: 1999
- Jurisdiction: Bulgaria
- Headquarters: Sofia, Bulgaria
- Minister responsible: Irina Shtonova (acting)
- Website: mi.government.bg

The Ministry of Economy and Industry (Bulgarian: Министерство на икономиката и индустрията, romanized: Ministerstvo na ikonomikata i industriyata) of Bulgaria is the ministry charged with regulating the economy and energy policy of the country. The Ministry of Economy was founded in December 1999 through the merger of the Ministry of Industry and the Ministry of Commerce and Tourism. In August 2005 was formed the current Ministry of Economy and Energy through the merger of the former Ministry of Economy and Ministry of Energy and Energy Resources.

In August 2005, the Minister of Economy and Energy was Rumen Ovcharov of the Bulgarian Socialist Party, with Deputy Ministers Lachezar Borisov, Valentin Ivanov, Yordan Dimov, Nina Radeva, Korneliya Ninova, Galina Tosheva and Anna Yaneva.

In March 2012, the Minister of Economy, Energy, and Tourism switched to Delyan Dobrev.
