= Kostadin Kostadinov (roboticist) =

Professor of robotics (born 1955)

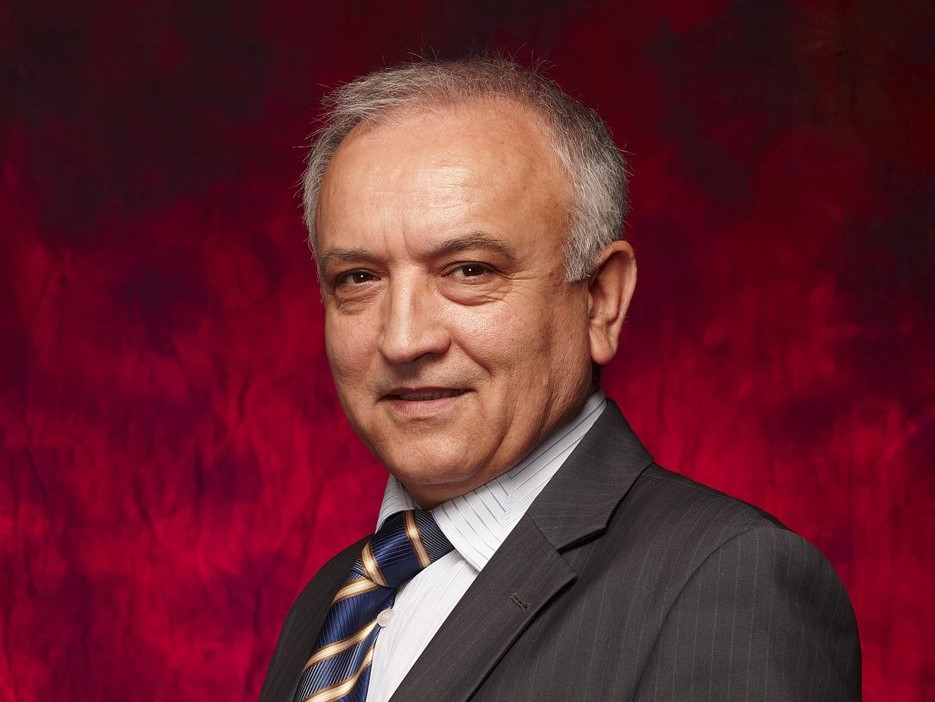
- Kostadinov in 2019
- Born: Kostadin Grozev Kostadinov; 27 November 1955 (age 70); Svilengrad, PR Bulgaria
- Education: Technical University, Sofia; Bulgarian Academy of Sciences (PhD)
- Occupations: Professor of Robotics and Mechatronics

Kostadin Grozev Kostadinov (Bulgarian: Костадин Грозев Костадинов; born 27 November 1955) is a professor of robotics at the Bulgarian Academy of Sciences and former Deputy Minister for Education in Bulgaria.

== Biography ==
Kostadin Kostadinov was born on 27 November 1955 in Svilengrad, Bulgaria. He acquired a Master’s degree in both Electrical engineering and in Robotics at the Technical University of Sofia in the period 1976 – 1983. In 1994 he finished his PhD in Applied mechanics at the Bulgarian Academy of Sciences (BAS). He has since participated in many scientific forums across Europe. He became a full-time professor at BAS in 2008 and currently works at its Institute of Mechanics.

== Political career ==
After the collapse of communism in Bulgaria, professor Kostadinov became co-founder of a political party in 1990, called Conservative Party in Bulgaria (Bulgarian: Консервативна партия в България). The party did not survive the next decade and in 2006 Kostadinov participated in the foundation of GERB – a political party which would go on to win successive parliamentary elections from 2009 onward. Kostadinov became advisor to Minister of Education Yordanka Fandakova (GERB) in August 2009 and held this position till January the following year. From November 2014 till March 2016 Kostadin Kostadinov was Deputy Minister for Education in the second cabinet of Prime-Minister Boyko Borissov. He was part of the team of Minister of Education Todor Tanev, who was a member of the Reformist Bloc – a constituent party of the then-ruling coalition, led by GERB. After GERB formed their third government in 2017, Kostadinov again became advisor to the Minister of Education, Krasimir Valchev (GERB).

== Notable works ==
- Kostadinov, Kostadin (December 1997). Mechatronics: An approach to go inside. Universitatea "Dunărea de Jos".
- Kostadinov, Kostadin (October 2006). Impedance Scalling Approach For Teleoperation Robot Control.
- Kostadinov, Kostadin. Hydro-MiNTS Approach for Development of Integrated Microrobotic System for Innovative Micro &Nano Biomedical Applications. XII Int. Conference on Systems, Automatic control and Measurements. pp. 17–24.
- Kostadinov, Kostadin. "Hydro-Mina Robot Technology for Micro and Nano Manipulation in Manufacturing of Micro Products". Mobile Intelligent Autonomous Systems. pp. 409–420.
- Kostadinov, Kostadin (November 2007). Impedance Approach For Conceptual Design Of Mechatronic Systems.
- BG 110763, Kostadinov, Kostadin; Ranchev, Sergey & Tyankov, Tihomir, "Vacuum gripping device"
- BG 110652, Kostadinov, Kostadin; Konstantinov, Spiro & Genova, Penka et al., "Bioreactor device"
- BG 110645, Kostadinov, Kostadin; Ranchev, Sergey & Tyankov, Tihomir, "A device for control of chips"
- BG 110597, Kostadinov, Kostadin; Genova, Penka & Tyankov, Tihomir et al., "Micro electric-mechanical device for manipulators"
- BG 110436, Kostadinov, Kostadin; Al-Ouahab, Mohamed & Schryeder, Joachim, "Micromanipulator"
- BG 112430, Kostadinov, Kostadin; Koseva, Neli & Petrov, Petar, "Method for neutron detection and neutron detector"
