= Ministry of Justice (Bulgaria) =

Government ministry of Bulgaria

- Министерство на правосъдието
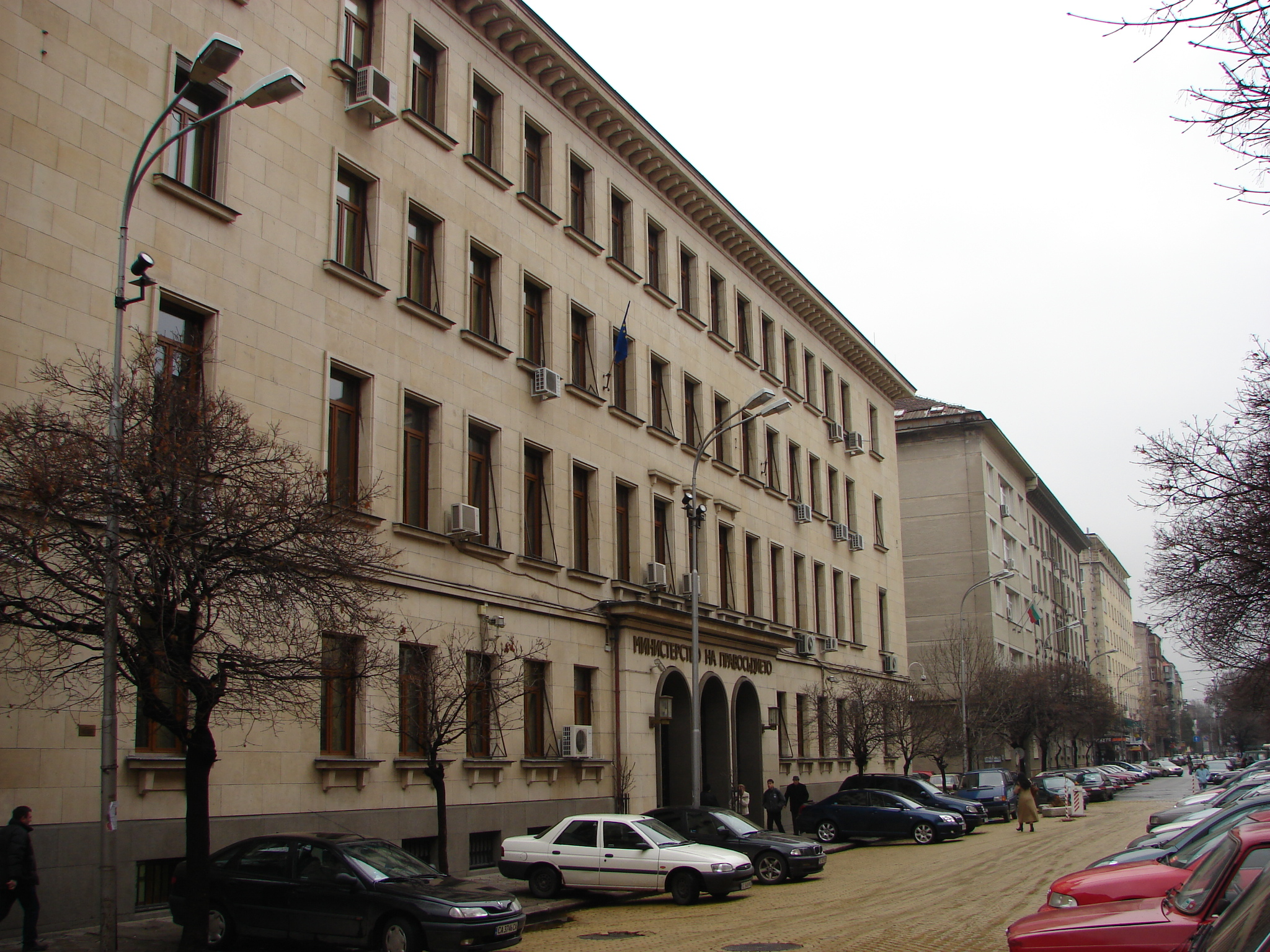
- Ministry of Justice building in Sofia

Agency overview
- Formed: 5 July 1879
- Jurisdiction: Government of Bulgaria
- Headquarters: Sofia, 1 Slavyanska Str
- Agency executive: Atanas Slavov, Minister of Justice
- Website: justice.government.bg

Established by Decree No 1 of July 5, 1879, the Ministry of Justice of Bulgaria (Bulgarian: Министерство на правосъдието на България, romanized: Ministerstvo na pravosadieto na Bǎlgariya) is the link between the executive and judicial branches of power in Bulgaria. It directs the writing of new laws related to the judiciary and offers feedback on laws prepared by other government organizations.

== List of ministers ==
=== Minister of Justice (1879–1997) ===
Government	Name	Dates	Party
1	Dimitar Grekov	July 5, 1879 – November 24, 1879	Conservative Party
2	Dimitar Grekov	November 24, 1879 – March 26, 1880	Conservative Party
3	Hristo Stoyanov	March 26, 1880 – November 28, 1880	non-Party
4	Petko Karavelov	28 November 1880 – 27 April 1881	Liberal Party
5	Porphyry Stamatov	April 27, 1881 – July 1, 1881	non-Party
6	Georgi Teoharov	July 1, 1881 – June 23, 1882	non-Party
7	Dimitar Grekov	June 23, 1882 – March 3, 1883	Conservative Party
7	Georgi Teoharov	3 March 1883 – 23 June 1883	non-Party
7	Hristo Stoyanov	June 23, 1883 – September 7, 1883	non-Party
8	Konstantin Stoilov	September 7, 1883 – December 31, 1883	Conservative Party
9	Konstantin Potyanov	1 January 1883 – 29 June 1884	Progressive Liberal Party
10	Vasil Radoslavov	June 29, 1884 – July 15, 1886	Liberal Party
10	Gavril Oroshakov	July 15, 1886 – August 9, 1886	Liberal Party
11	Vasil Radoslavov	9 August 1886 – August 12, 1886	Liberal Party
12	Gavril Oroshakov	12 August 1886 – August 16, 1886	Liberal Party
13	Dimitar Tonchev	16 August 1886 – 26 August 1886	Liberal Party (Radoslavists)
13	Konstantin Stoilov	26 August 1886 – 28 June 1887	Conservative Party
14	Konstantin Stoilov	June 29, 1887 – August 20, 1887	Conservative Party
15	Konstantin Stoilov	20 August 1887 – 12 December 1888	Conservative Party
15	Dimitar Tonchev	December 12, 1888 – September 20, 1891	Liberal Party (Radoslavists)
15	Dimitar Grekov	September 20, 1891 – February 13, 1892	National Liberal Party
15	Ivan Salabashev	13 February 1892 – 12 December 1892	National Liberal Party
15	Panayot Slavkov	12 December 1892 – 19 November 1893	National Liberal Party
15	Konstantin Potyanov	19 November 1893 – 19 May 1894	National Liberal Party
16	Vasil Radoslavov	19 May 1894 – 17 September 1894	Liberal Party (Radoslavists)
16	Peter Peshev	17 September 1894 – 9 December 1894	Liberal Party (Radoslavists)
17	Dimitar Mincevic	December 9, 1894 – November 13, 1895	People's Party
17	Konstantin Stoilov	November 13, 1895 – February 10, 1896	People's Party
17	Theodor Teodorov	10 February 1896 – 26 August 1897	People's Party
17	Georgi Zgurev	26 August 1897 – 18 January 1899	People's Party
18	Peter Peshev	19 January 1899 – 1 October 1899	Liberal Party (Radoslavists)
19	Peter Peshev	1 October 1899 – 27 November 1900	Liberal Party (Radoslavists)
20	Peter Danchov	November 27, 1900 – January 12, 1901	non-Party
21	Peter Danchov	12 January 1901 – 20 February 1901	non-Party
22	Alexander Radev	20 February 1901 – 21 December 1901	Progressive Liberal Party
23	Alexander Radev	21 December 1901 – 4 November 1902	Progressive Liberal Party
24	Hristo Todorov	4 November 1902 – 18 March 1903	Progressive Liberal Party
25	Hristo Todorov	March 18, 1903 – May 6, 1903	Progressive Liberal Party
26	Nikola Genadiev	May 6, 1903 – January 30, 1904	National Liberal Party
26	Peter Staikov	January 30, 1904 – August 18, 1905	National Liberal Party
26	Konstantin Panayodov	18 August 1905 – 22 October 1906	National Liberal Party
27	Konstantin Panayodov	October 23, 1906 – February 26, 1907	National Liberal Party
28	Konstantin Panayodov	27 February 1907 – 3 March 1907	National Liberal Party
29	Konstantin Panayodov	March 3, 1907 – January 16, 1908	National Liberal Party
30	Todor Krastev	January 16, 1908 – September 5, 1910	Democratic Party
31	Hristo Slaveykov	September 5, 1910 – March 16, 1911	Democratic Party
32	Peter Abrashev	March 16, 1911 – June 1, 1913	Progressive Liberal Party
33	Peter Abrashev	June 1, 1913 – July 4, 1913	Progressive Liberal Party
34	Peter Peshev	July 4, 1913 – September 23, 1913	Liberal Party (Radoslavists)
34	Hristo Popov	September 23, 1913 – December 23, 1913	Liberal Party (Radoslavists)
35	Hristo Popov	December 23, 1913 – June 21, 1918	Liberal Party (Radoslavists)
36	Joseph Fedenhecht	June 21, 1918 – October 17, 1918	Radical Democratic Party
37	Alexander Malinov	October 17, 1918 – November 28, 1918	Democratic Party
38	Peter Djidrov	November 28, 1918 – May 7, 1919	BRDS
39	Venelin Ganev	May 8, 1919 – October 6, 1919	Radical Democratic Party
40	Marko Turlakov	6 October 1919 – 21 February 1920	BANU
40	Alexander Radolov	21 February 1920 – 9 November 1921	BANU
40	Peter Yanev	9 November 1921 – 9 February 1923	BANU
41	Peter Yanev	9 February 1923 – 14 March 1923	BANU
41	Spas Duparinov	March 14, 1923 – June 9, 1923	BANU
42	Boyan Smilov	June 9, 1923 – September 22, 1923	National Liberal Party
43	Yanko Stoyanchov	September 22, 1923 – January 29, 1924	Democratic conspiracy
43	Rashko Madzharov	January 29, 1924 – November 3, 1924	Democratic conspiracy
43	Tsvyatko Boboshevski	November 3, 1924 – January 4, 1926	Democratic conspiracy
44	Todor Kulev	4 January 1926 – 12 September 1928	Democratic conspiracy
45	Todor Kulev	September 12, 1928 – May 15, 1930	Democratic conspiracy
46	Kancho Milanov	15 May 1930 – 29 June 1931	Democratic conspiracy
47	Dimitar Varbanov	June 29, 1931 – October 12, 1931	National Liberal Party
48	Dimitar Varbanov	October 12, 1931 – September 7, 1932	National Liberal Party
49	Dimitar Varbanov	September 7, 1932 – December 31, 1932	National Liberal Party
50	Nikola Mushanov	December 31, 1932 – January 19, 1933	Democratic Party
50	Jordan Kachakov	19 January 1932 – 19 May 1934	National Liberal Party
51	Peter Midilev	May 19, 1934 – May 23, 1934	non-Party
51	Kimon Georgiev	May 23, 1934 – January 22, 1935	Unit
52	Mihail Kalenderov	January 22, 1935 – January 29, 1935	non-Party
52	Lyuben Dikov	January 29, 1935 – April 21, 1935	non-Party
53	Angel Karagyozov	April 21, 1935 – November 23, 1935	non-Party
54	Dimitar Peshev	November 23, 1935 – July 4, 1936	non-Party
55	Angel Karagyozov	July 4, 1936 – May 21, 1937	non-Party
55	Alexander Ognyanov	May 21, 1937 – January 28, 1938	non-Party
55	Ilia Kozhuharov	January 28, 1938 – November 14, 1938	non-Party
56	Nikola Yotov	November 14, 1938 – October 23, 1939	non-Party
57	Vasil Mitakov	23 October 1939 – 15 February 1940	non-Party
58	Vasil Mitakov	15 February 1940 – 11 April 1942	non-Party
59	Konstantin Partov	April 11, 1942 – September 14, 1943	non-Party
60	Konstantin Partov	September 14, 1943 – June 1, 1944	non-Party
61	Rousse Russev	1 June 1944 – 12 June 1944	non-Party
61	Alexander Staliiski	June 12, 1944 – September 2, 1944	non-Party
62	Boris Pavlov	September 2, 1944 – September 9, 1944	Democratic Party
63	Mincho Neychev	9 September 1944 – 31 March 1946	BRP (k)
64	Luben Kolarov	31 March 1946 – 22 November 1946	BANU
65	Radi Naydenov	November 23, 1946 – December 11, 1947	BANU
66	Radi Naydenov	December 12, 1947 – July 20, 1949	BANU
67	Radi Naydenov	July 20, 1949 – January 20, 1950	BANU
68	Radi Naydenov	January 20, 1950 – January 20, 1954	BANU
69	Radi Naydenov	January 20, 1954 – April 18, 1956	BANU
70	Radi Naydenov	April 18, 1956 – January 15, 1958	BANU
71	Radi Naydenov	15 January 1958 – 17 March 1962	BANU
72	Peter Tanchev	March 17, 1962 – November 27, 1962	BANU
73	Peter Tanchev	27 November 1962 – 12 March 1966	BANU
74	Svetla Daskalova [1st female]	12 March 1966 – 9 July 1971	BANU
75	Svetla Daskalova	July 9, 1971 – June 17, 1976	BANU
76	Svetla Daskalova	June 17, 1976 – June 18, 1981	BANU
77	Svetla Daskalova	18 June 1981 – 19 June 1986	BANU
78	Svetla Daskalova	19 June 1986 – 8 February 1990	BANU
79	Pencho Penev	8 February 1990 – 5 September 1990	BANU
79	Angel Djambazov	5 September 1990 – 21 September 1990	BSP
80	Angel Djambazov	September 21, 1990 – December 20, 1990	BSP
81	Pencho Penev	22 December 1990 – 8 November 1991	BSP
82	Svetoslav Luchnikov	8 November 1991 – 30 December 1992	UDF
83	Misho Valchev	30 December 1992 – 23 June 1993	non-Party
83	Peter Kornajev	23 June 1993 – 17 October 1994	BSDP
84	Theodore Chipev	17 October 1994 – 25 January 1995	non-Party
85	Mladen Chervenyakov	25 January 1995 to 12 February 1997	BSP
86	Haralambi Anchev	12 February 1997 – 21 May 1997	non-Party

=== Minister for Justice and Legal European Integration (1997–1999) ===
Government	Name	Dates	Party
87	Vasil Gotsev	21 May 1997 – 21 December 1999	Democratic Party

=== Minister of Justice (1999–present) ===
Government	Name	Dates	Party
87	Theodosius Simeonov	21 December 1999 – 24 July 2001	SDS
88	Anton Stankov	24 July 2001 – 17 August 2005	NDSV
89	Georgi Petkanov	17 August 2005 – 19 July 2007	NDSV
89	Miglena Tacheva	19 July 2007 – 27 July 2009	NDSV
90	Margarita Popova	July 27, 2009 – November 30, 2011	GERB
90	Diana Kovacheva	30 November 2011 – 13 March 2013	GERB
91	Dragomir Yordanov	March 13, 2013 – May 29, 2013	Independent
92	Zinaida Zlatanova	May 29, 2013 – August 6, 2014	Independent
93	Hristo Ivanov	6 August 2014 – 7 November 2014	Independent
94	Hristo Ivanov	7 November 2014 – 18 December 2015	Independent
94	Ekaterina Zaharieva	December 18, 2015 – January 27, 2017	GERB
95	Maria Pavlova	January 27, 2017 – May 4, 2017	Independent
96	Tsetska Tsacheva	May 4, 2017 – April 5, 2019	GERB
96	Danail Kirilov	April 5, 2019 – September 3, 2020	GERB
96	Desislava Akhladova	September 3, 2020 – May 12, 2021	GERB
97	Yanaki Stoilov	May 12, 2021 - September 16, 2021	BSP
98	Yanaki Stoilov	September 16, 2021 - October 29, 2021	BSP
98	Ivan Dermendzhiev	October 29, 2021 - December 13, 2021	Independent
99	Nadezhda Yordanova	December 13, 2021 - August 2, 2022	DB
100	Krum Zarkov	August 2, 2022 - February 2, 2023	Independent
101	Krum Zarkov	February 2, 2023 - June 6, 2023	Independent
102	Atanas Slavov	June 6, 2023 - April 9, 2024	PP-DB

== See also ==
- Justice ministry
- Министър на правосъдието на България (Minister of Justice of Bulgaria)
- Politics of Bulgaria
