= Nikolai Denkov =

Prime Minister of Bulgaria from 2023 to 2024

- Николай Денков
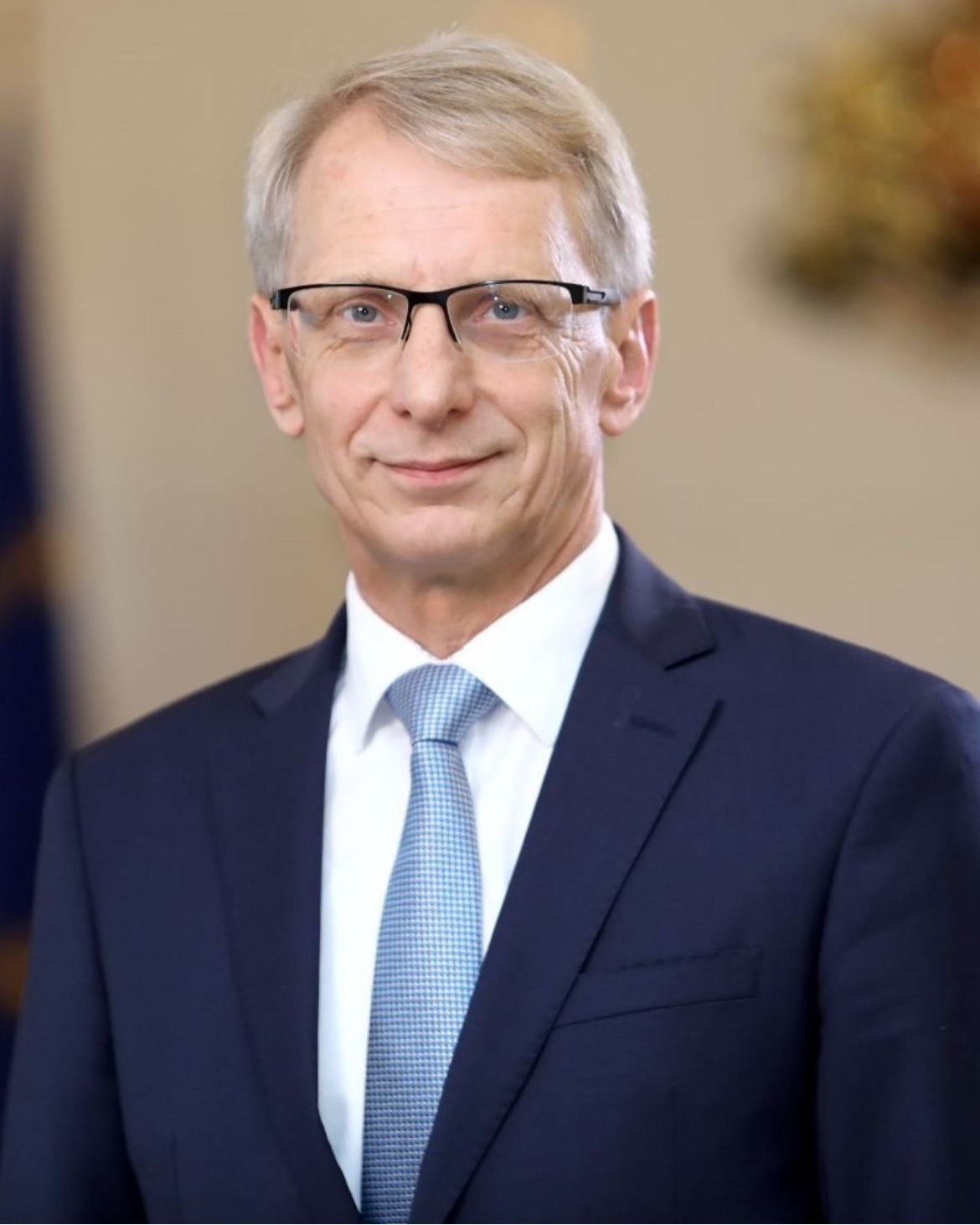
- Official portrait, 2023

Prime Minister of Bulgaria
- In office 6 June 2023 – 9 April 2024
- President: Rumen Radev
- Deputy: Mariya Gabriel
- Preceded by: Galab Donev
- Succeeded by: Dimitar Glavchev (caretaker)

Member of the National Assembly
- Incumbent
- Assumed office 9 April 2024
- Constituency: See list: 30th MMC – Shumen (2024-2024) 2nd MMC - Burgas (2024-2024) 25th MMC - Sofia (2024-present)
- In office 19 October 2022 – 6 June 2023
- Constituency: 30th MMC – Shumen

Minister of Education and Science
- In office 12 May 2021 – 2 August 2022
- Prime Minister: Stefan Yanev; Kiril Petkov
- Preceded by: Krasimir Valchev
- Succeeded by: Sasho Penov
- In office 27 January 2017 – 4 May 2017
- Prime Minister: Ognyan Gerdzhikov
- Preceded by: Meglena Kuneva
- Succeeded by: Krasimir Valchev

Deputy Minister of Education and Science
- In office 12 August 2014 – 5 April 2016
- Prime Minister: Boyko Borisov
- Minister: Todor Tanev; Meglena Kuneva

Personal details
- Born: Nikolai Denkov Denkov; 3 September 1962 (age 63) Stara Zagora, PR Bulgaria
- Party: We Continue the Change (since 2022)
- Other political affiliations: Independent (until 2022)
- Education: Sofia University
- Occupation: Politician; chemist; physicist

Nikolai Denkov Denkov (Bulgarian: Николай Денков Денков, born 3 September 1962) is a Bulgarian politician who served as Prime Minister of Bulgaria from 2023 to 2024. A member of the PP party, he previously served as Member of the National Assembly from 2022 to 2023 and as Minister of Education and Science in 2017 and from 2021 to 2022. Denkov is a physicist, physical chemist and chemist. He is a member of the Bulgarian Academy of Sciences and was a lecturer at the University of Sofia.

== Early life ==
Nikolai was born on 3 September 1962, in Stara Zagora, Bulgaria. After elementary school, he moved to the Bulgarian capital Sofia, where he graduated from the National Gymnasium for Science and Mathematics in 1980. In the same year he was a participant at the 12th International Chemistry Olympiad in Linz (Austria) he won a silver medal.

This was followed by a master's degree in chemistry and pharmacy at the St. Kliment-Ohridski University in Sofia, which he completed in 1987. In 1993, he defended his dissertation and obtained his doctorate.

For the early part of his career, Denkov worked as visiting researcher in JRDC (Japan), senior researcher in Rhone-Poulenc R&D (France), lead scientist in Unilever R&D (USA), and guest professor in France (ESPCI-Paris and Univ. Lille).

== Academic career ==
Denkov has been an adjunct lecturer since 1997 and professor of physical chemistry at the University of Sofia since 2008. Between 2008 and 2015 he was head of the faculty for technical chemistry and director of the master's course Disperse Systems in Chemical Technologies. He has been a doctor of chemistry since 2007. He specialized in Japan and at Uppsala University in Sweden and worked as a senior scientist in the research institutes of private companies such as Unilever (USA) and Rhône-Poulenc (France).

In 2010 he was awarded the highest national award "Pythagoras" for scientific achievements by the Bulgarian Ministry of Education and Science. In 2013 he received the Medal of Honor with Blue Ribbon from the University of Sofia.

Between 2012 and 2013, Denkov was a member of various working groups in the Ministry of Education and Science and in the Council of Ministers. He actively participated in the development of the concept of the Operational Program Science and Education for Smart Growth and in the discussions for the Partnership Agreement for 2013–2020 between the Republic of Bulgaria and the European Commission.

== Civil service career ==
From August 2014 to April 2016, Denkov was Deputy Minister of Education and Science in the Borisov II government, responsible for higher education and the European Structural Funds, including the implementation of the Operational Program Science and Education for Smart Growth. From 27 January 2017, to 4 May 2017, he was Interim Minister for Education and Science in Gerdzhikov's interim government.

In 2019, Denkov was awarded the Solvay Prize of the European Colloid and Interface Society (ECIS) for his research achievements and he was elected a full member of the Academia Europaea.

== Political career ==
=== Education minister (2021–2022) ===
Between 12 May 2021, and 13 December 2021, he was again interim minister for education and science in the acting governments of Yanev I and Yanev II during the COVID-19 pandemic. When after the general election in November 2021 that We Continue the Change (PP) had the largest congressional faction was and could form a coalition capable of governing, Denkov became the education minister in the Cabinet of Kiril Petkov.

=== Prime Minister of Bulgaria (2023–2024) ===
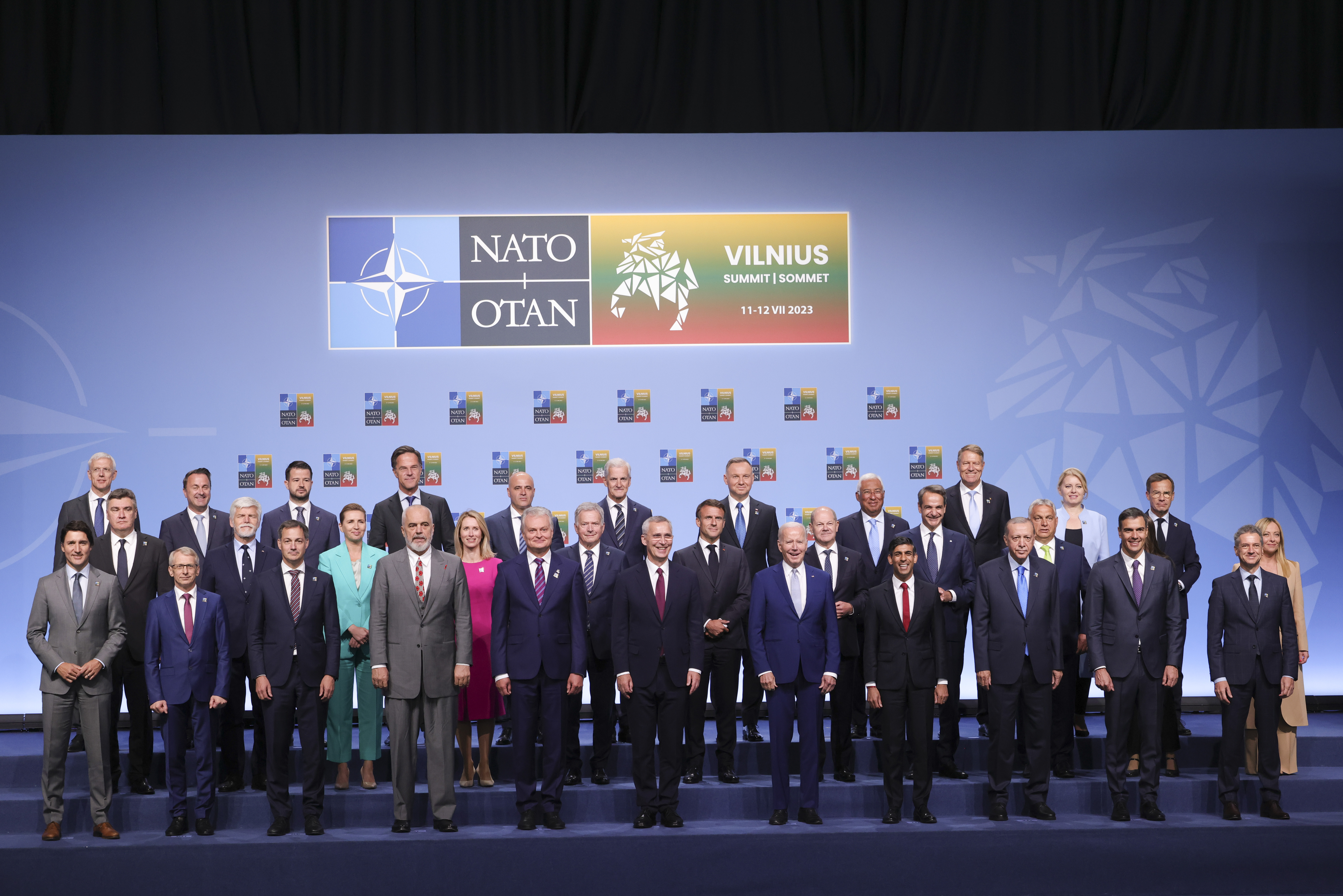
Nikolai Denkov at the NATO 2023 Vilnius summit (Bottom Left next to Justin Trudeau)

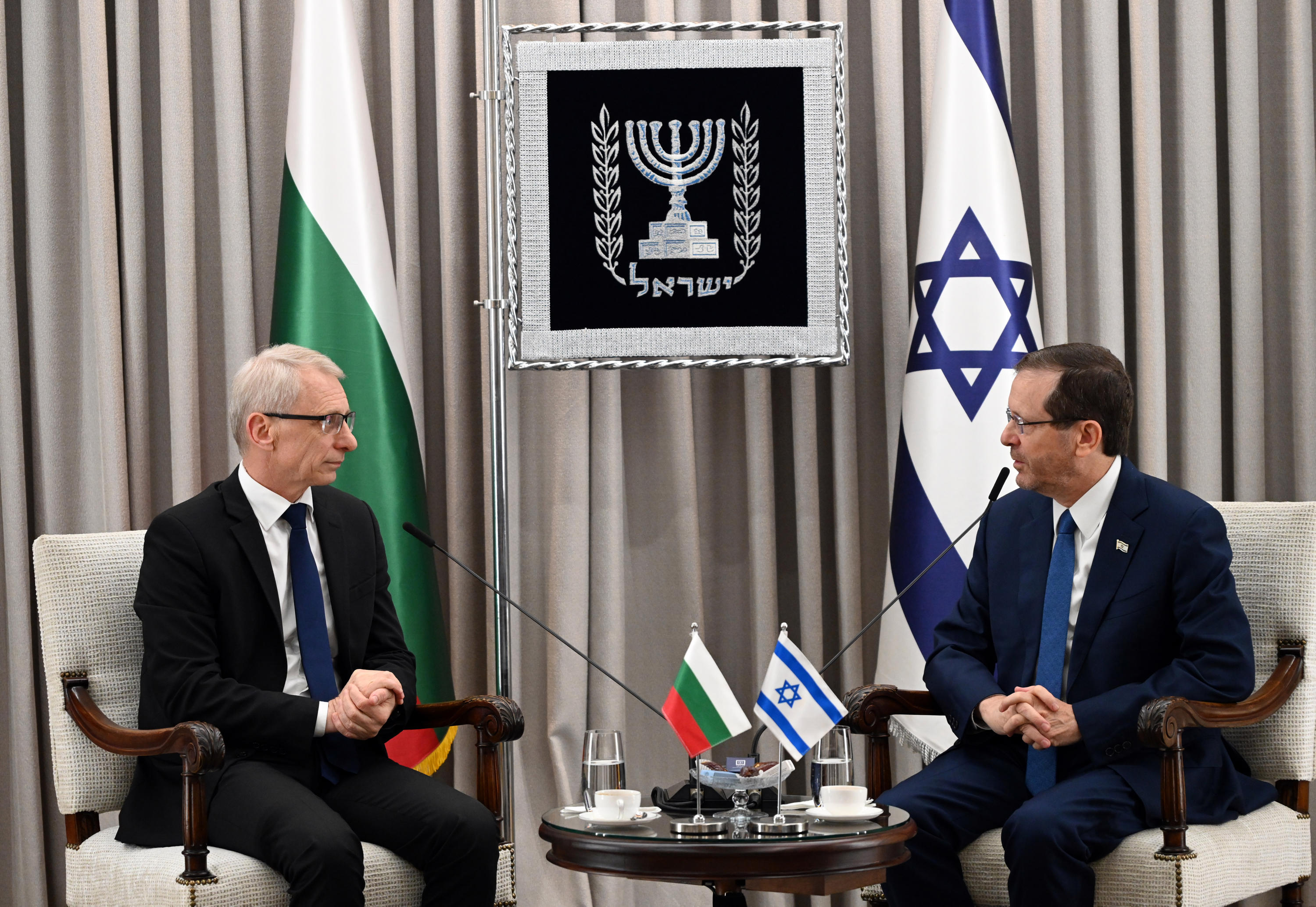
Denkov with Israeli President Isaac Herzog in Jerusalem, Israel, 6 November 2023

Following the outcome of the Bulgarian parliamentary elections held in April 2023, on 22 May Denkov was projected to become Prime Minister of Bulgaria as part of a power-sharing agreement between the two most-voted coalitions, GERB—SDS and PP–DB. The deal implied that Denkov would lead the new government for the following nine months, before switching positions with Mariya Gabriel.

Following extensive talks between the two coalitions involved, as well as the Movement for Rights and Freedoms, an official agreement on the composition of the Denkov-Gabriel cabinet was reached on 2 June. On 6 June, the 49th National Assembly of Bulgaria voted in Denkov's new government, with 132 votes in favor and 69 against. The new government will focus on fighting Russian influence in Bulgaria's security sector and obtaining membership in the Schengen Area and the eurozone. A political crisis prompted Bulgaria to postpone adopting the euro until 2025. In December 2022, Austrian and Dutch opposition blocked Bulgaria and Romania from becoming members of the Schengen Area.

In September 2023, Denkov called Azerbaijan a "valuable partner" of Bulgaria. Denkov condemned Hamas' actions during the Gaza war and expressed his support to Israel.

On 30 December 2023, it became clear that Denkov's cabinet had secured membership for Bulgaria in the Schengen Area by air and sea. Although further negotiations in 2024 would be required to lift border controls by land, this was a major diplomatic success for the Denkov-Gabriel cabinet, which aimed for а positive decision regarding Schengen Area membership by the end of 2023 as part of the five government priorities stated in July of the same year.

Denkov resigned on 6 March 2024 as part of the power-sharing agreement with Gabriel. However, on 25 March, Gabriel withdrew her nomination for prime minister after announcing that negotiations on forming a new government with PP-DB had failed, and said that new elections would be held.

=== Post premiership (2024–present) ===
On the evening of 1 December 2025 amidst large anger in Sofia over the 2026 Budget proposal that exacerbated the 2025 Bulgarian budget protests, Denkov said that 'Provocateurs with masks cannot replace the peaceful protest!' Denkov also said that the 2 reasons why they were protesting was because 'the people had been really fed up with the lies and that there were a number of lies related to the Budget that was discussed at the 1st or 2 December 2025.' And the other reason Denkov believes why the Protests have started was because 'The people who are Governing Bulgaria right now were Characterised with a-lot of arrogance and brutal force that they will impose their will which also included the Budget and that the reason for the protests wasn't just the Budget but also because the people were really fed up with it and that they want to say: "stop! It is not working this way!".'

Political offices
Preceded by Todor Tanev	Minister of Education and Science; 2017	Succeeded by Krasimir Valchev
Preceded by Krasimir Valchev	Minister of Education and Science; 2021–2022	Succeeded by Sasho Penov
Preceded by Galab Donev	Prime Minister of Bulgaria; 2023–2024	Succeeded by Dimitar Glavchev
