= Gerdzhikov Government =

Government of Bulgaria (Jan–May 2017)

- 95th Cabinet of Bulgaria
- 27 January 2017–4 May 2017
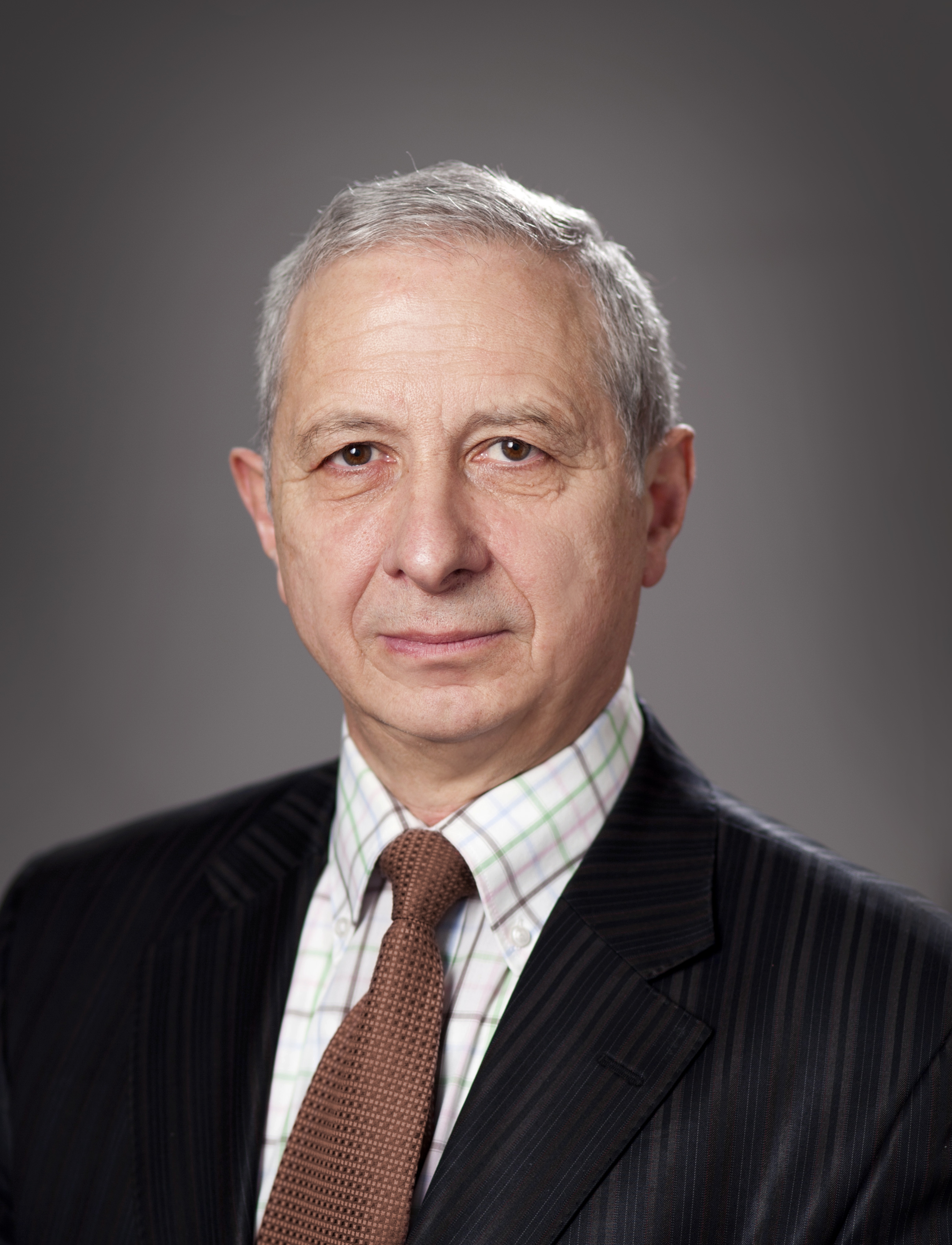
- Date formed: 27 January 2017
- Date dissolved: 4 May 2017

People and organisations
- President: Rumen Radev
- Prime Minister: Ognyan Gerdzhikov
- No. of ministers: 20
- Member party: Independents
- Status in legislature: Provisional Government

History
- Predecessor: Second Borisov Government
- Successor: Third Borisov Government

The ninety-fifth Cabinet of Bulgaria took office on 27 January 2017, following the resignation of the Second Borisov Government. The government led the country through to the 26 March parliamentary elections.

== Cabinet ==
Cabinet members
Portfolio	Minister	Took office	Left office	Party
Prime Minister	Ognyan Gerdzhikov	27 January 2017	4 May 2017	Independent
Deputy Prime Minister for Social Policy and Healthcare Minister	Ilko Semerdzhiev	27 January 2017	4 May 2017	Independent
Deputy Prime Minister for Internal Order and Security and Defence Minister	Stefan Yanev	27 January 2017	4 May 2017	Independent
Deputy Prime Minister for EU Funds	Malina Krumova	27 January 2017	4 May 2017	Independent
Deputy Prime Minister for Bulgaria's Presidency of the Council of the EU	Denitsa Zlateva	27 January 2017	4 May 2017	Independent
Minister of Interior	Plamen Ouzounov	27 January 2017	4 May 2017	Independent
Ministry of Finance	Kiril Ananiev	27 January 2017	4 May 2017	Independent
Foreign Minister	Radi Naidenov	27 January 2017	4 May 2017	Independent
Minister of Justice	Maria Pavlova	27 January 2017	4 May 2017	Independent
Labour and Social Policy Minister	Galab Donev	27 January 2017	4 May 2017	Independent
Regional Development Minister	Spas Popnikolov	27 January 2017	4 May 2017	Independent
Minister of Economy	Teodor Sedlarski	27 January 2017	4 May 2017	Independent
Minister of Energy	Nikolai Pavlov	27 January 2017	4 May 2017	Independent
Minister of Environment and Water	Irina Kostova	27 January 2017	4 May 2017	Independent
Minister of Agriculture and Food	Hristo Bozoukov	27 January 2017	4 May 2017	Independent
Transport, Information Technologies and Communications Minister	Hristo Alexiev	27 January 2017	4 May 2017	Independent
Minister of Education	Nikolai Denkov	27 January 2017	4 May 2017	Independent
Minister of Culture	Rashko Mladenov	27 January 2017	4 May 2017	Independent
Tourism Minister	Stela Baltova	27 January 2017	4 May 2017	Independent
Minister of Youth and Sports	Daniela Dasheva	27 January 2017	4 May 2017	Independent
