= Screen media =

Screen media may refer to:

- Digital signage
- Screen Media Films, a film distributor
- Screen Media (advertising company)
