= Fernando Bolívar Galiano =

Spanish painter, scientist and sculptor (born 1965)

Fernando Bolivar Galiano was born on October 5, 1965, in Alcalá la Real, Jaén, Spain, to José Bolívar Gómez de Urda and Concepción G. Suárez de Urbina. Fernando Bolívar -Ferbo Ligali- is a pioneer in studies on the bio-deterioration of cultural goods.

== Biography ==
In the 1980s, he became a part of the ADENA-WWF management in Granada, Spain, acting for several years as a monitor for a camp founded by Félix Rodríguez de la Fuente in the province of Segovia, Spain, and simultaneously started his studies in Fine Arts and Biology at the University of Granada. In 1991, the Ministry of Education and Science gave him a scholarship to specialize in bio-deterioration at the pioneering laboratory of the institution located in Rome, ICR (Istituto Centrale per il Restuaro), where he collaborated in research into the restoration of the Coliseum and the Trevi Fountain. After completing the investigations, he received the first scholarship for research for the first year of graduates in this subject from the Faculty of Fine Arts, for which he wrote the first Spanish thesis on the bio-deterioration of cultural assets. He obtained a doctorate in 1994 for descriptive, analytical, and experimental studies on photosynthetic organisms in the Nasrid Palaces of the Alhambra. The thesis highlights the significance of microalgae in the conservation of Spain's most visited monument for the first time.

He is currently an Arts professor at the University of Granada (the only one trained to teach all the subjects of Art, Restoration and Biology). Under his pseudonym Ferbo Ligali, he also carries out his work as a visual artist, creating paintings, sculptures, graphic work and installations in which he constructs a fusion of science and art.

He was a pioneer in the defense of the rights of children affected by divorce, and co-founded the DEHISE association. He is currently the president of the Defense of Effective Equality and Justice association and is associated with the Federation for the Defense of Effective Equality.

He is currently the creator of the cultural movement "Ligalismo" as part of an artistic-scientific trend.

== Arts and Science in his Work ==
The search for scientific applications for art and artistic responses for science has been central to his education and subsequent specialized works.

This concern for the symbiosis between art and the humanities/sciences, typical of the Renaissance yet still valid today, has been a characteristic since his career began in all of his research, teaching, professional and management activities, which are very useful in managing teams that require integration of two fields that are supposedly so different.

1. Studies on the conservation and restoration of monuments, painting with an easel and textiles: Especially concerning the Alhambra as regards the bio-deterioration of hydraulic architecture, for example the monumental fountains, with diagnosis and treatment of bio-deterioration using biological agents (bacteria, vascular plants, algae, fungi, insects and vertebrates).

2. Artistic creations: Mainly pictorial, sculptural or illustrations and photographs.

=== Teaching and professional activity ===
He started teaching in 1991, giving practical introductory classes on procedures in the Department of Art of Granada. In 1992 he became responsible for introducing restoration and later subjects related to the restoration of textiles, being the only lecturer in this subject in Spain. This included deterioration agents, conservation problems, deterioration factors, exhibition designs and other matters related to pictorial production such as painting and figuration, art and the natural environment, pictorial techniques and technology, painting and representation: the natural environment, etc.

Furthermore, in order to provide Fine Arts students with the scientific bases to study bio-deterioration and artistic techniques, he created elective courses, specifically: "Basic Biology applied to Artistic Techniques and Restoration" and "Bio-deterioration and Restoration: Organic Materials".

His interest in teaching has led him to participate in the Teaching Innovation Project, in which he has attempted to facilitate and update the teaching of restoration, bio- deterioration, painting and scientific enlightenment. Thus, he participates in activities involved in adapting existing studies to the European Higher Education Area (EHEA).

He is the director and founder of the BIO-ARTE class (Granada Artists for Nature, 2006) at the Faculty of Fine Arts, which has a specialized illustration and "Wildlife Art" workshop in the Albayzin district, where he organizes various activities such as field trips, painting contests and awards, and exhibitions by students. He also organizes various activities such as workshops in the Science Park, book illustrations, websites, DVDs, exhibitions and training courses on painting and illustration of nature; and has been the Classroom Musical director at the Faculty of Fine and Performing Arts since 2005; and lab director for bio-deterioration.

=== Artistic Activity ===
In 1989 he had his first exhibition and since then he has participated and organized numerous individual and collective multidisciplinary exhibitions that have appeared in the local and national media, on television, radio, printed and digital media and the social networks, demonstrating the innovation and transcendence of his proposals in both artistic and scientific forums.

His best-known works are based on the use of live algae, developing an algal paint from ground, bonded microalgae with synthetic polymers, and on the other hand living pictures by cultivating microalgae between crystals. The "living pictures" are solid pictorial works in algae that has been isolated and framed between two panes of glass, some with small openings that allow air to pass through, evolving in composition and color in relation to the microorganisms that form them. He also has unique works created specifically to be viewed with 3D glasses, as well as made-to-order, personally designed chess sets.

== The Cabinet as a Museum ==
His exhibition "The strange Cabinet of Prof. Bolivar-Galiano", borne out of his particular combination of science and art, has allowed him to regain the use of cabinets as museums. The idea not to exhibit this work in galleries or conventional museums but rather in the places that inspired them, as in the case of "Art and Science" located at the Faculty in Granada, has enabled the creation a new concept of museum space where the exhibition was moved. Bolívar Galiano, this time under the artistic pseudonym Ferbo Ligali, proposes a return to the way of exhibiting before the dissociation of museums, when they were still called Cabinets of Curiosities or Halls of Marvels, and which subsequently became known as museums of natural history and natural sciences on the one hand and fine art galleries on the other. This drove him to the need to recreate the lighting and aesthetic environments for these unique spaces that attracted attention among both those knowledgeable in letters and those in sciences.

In this way and using his experience in mounting exhibitions, he created the Ferbo Ligali Cabinet-Museum, a space where besides acting as a cabinet, it also acts a museum where science and art come together in a corner of Granada where nature, beauty and science coexist in a space that allows for different cultural activities such as lectures, courses, workshops, seminars, film forums, photo forums, filming for television, concerts, theatre, etc., with room for all the artistic, scientific and philosophical disciplines too.

He recently installed a cabinet in the lobby of the Higher Royal Musical Conservatory's Auditorium in Granada as part of the Musik = Art = Science exhibition, which artistically demonstrates the relationship between science and music.

== Exhibitions ==
- Exhibition MUSIK=ART=SCIENCE with artworks from the Ferbo Ligali Museum and the Real Conservatorio Superior de Música in Granada. 2015.22 23
- "Poéticas del color y del límite". Exhibition devoted to José Guerrero in his centenary. Palacio de la Madraza. November–December 2014.
- "Arte y Ciencia: El extraño Gabinete del Profesor Bolivar Galiano". 2014.24
- Painting exhibition "El color de las Algas en la Alhambra". 2007
- Painting exhibition "Los 12 rostros de la Alhambra". 2007

== Scientific Production ==
- Bolívar Galiano, Fernando, L'Alhambra a Granada: 15 anni di indagini sulla conservazione delle fontane. L’acqua le pietre i bronzi. Le fontane momunentale. Palombi Editori. Rome. 2010. ISBN 978-88-6060-300-5'
- Bolívar Galiano, Fernando, "El Color como punto de encuentro entre Ciencia y Arte". BOCETOS. Boletín Asociación Española de Artistas de Naturaleza, 3: 3. 2007.
- Bolívar Galiano, Fernando, "Fauna en acción. Guía para observar comportamiento animal en España". 2006. Lynx Edicions. Bellaterra, Barcelona . ISBN 84-96553-23-X.
- Bolívar Galiano, Fernando, "Pintura Algal: paralelismos entre comunidades microalgales y técnicas pictóricas, ¿pudo ser la primera pintura?". ALGAS. Boletín de la Sociedad Española de Ficología, 30: 9-: 12. 2006.
- Bolívar Galiano, Fernando, "Microalgae associated with deteriorated stonework of the fountain of Bibatauín". International Biodeterioration and Biodegradation, 55: 55- 61.2005. England (UK)
- Bolívar Galiano, Fernando, "Artificial marble stones as a solution for biodeterioration by microalgae on monumental fountains". International Biodeterioration and Biodegradation, 53. 2004. England (UK).
- Bolívar Galiano, Fernando, "Indirect effects of a non target species, Pyrrhalta luteola (Chrysomelidae) on the biodeterioration of Brussels Tapestries". International Biodeterioration and Biodegradation, 54: 297-302. 2004. England (UK)
- Bolívar Galiano, Fernando, "Le Fontane Monumentali dell’Alhambra di Granad. Problemi di Biodeterioramento". Kermes 63- 68. Ottobre-dicembre 2002. Nardini Editore. Florence, Italy.
- Bolívar Galiano, Fernando, "Il biodeterioramento delle fontane dei Reales Alcazares di Siviglia e dell’Alhambra di Granada (Spagna)". Science and Technology for Cultural Heritage, 11(1-2): 111- 118. 2002. Pisa and Rome, Italy.
- Bolívar Galiano, Fernando, "Biomineralization Processes in the Fountains of the Alhambra, Granada, Spain". International Biodeterioration and Biodegradation: 40 (2-4) 205-215. 1997. England (UK).
- Bolívar Galiano, Fernando, "Preliminary Study on the Biodeterioration of Canvas Paintings from the Seventeenth Century By Microchiroptera". International Biodeterioration and Biodegradation: 40 (2-4): 161-169. 1997. England (UK).
- Bolívar Galiano, Fernando, "Preliminary results on the study of the algal biodeterioration within the Alhambra (Granada, Spain)." Bioderioration and Biodegradation 9. 210-216.1995. England. ISBN 0 85295319 4.
- Bolívar Galiano, Fernando, "Formas de deterioro en fuentes monumentales". Boletín del Colegio de Bellas artes de Andalucía (Teodosio 5). 19: 4- 5. 1995. Seville.
- Bolívar Galiano, Fernando, "Los agentes de biodeterioro del patrimonio pictórico, textil y gráfico". PH. Boletín del Instituto Andaluz del Patrominio Histórico. 12: 50- 51. 1995. Seville.
