= Ivanka Shalapatova =

Bulgarian politician

- Иванка Шалапатова
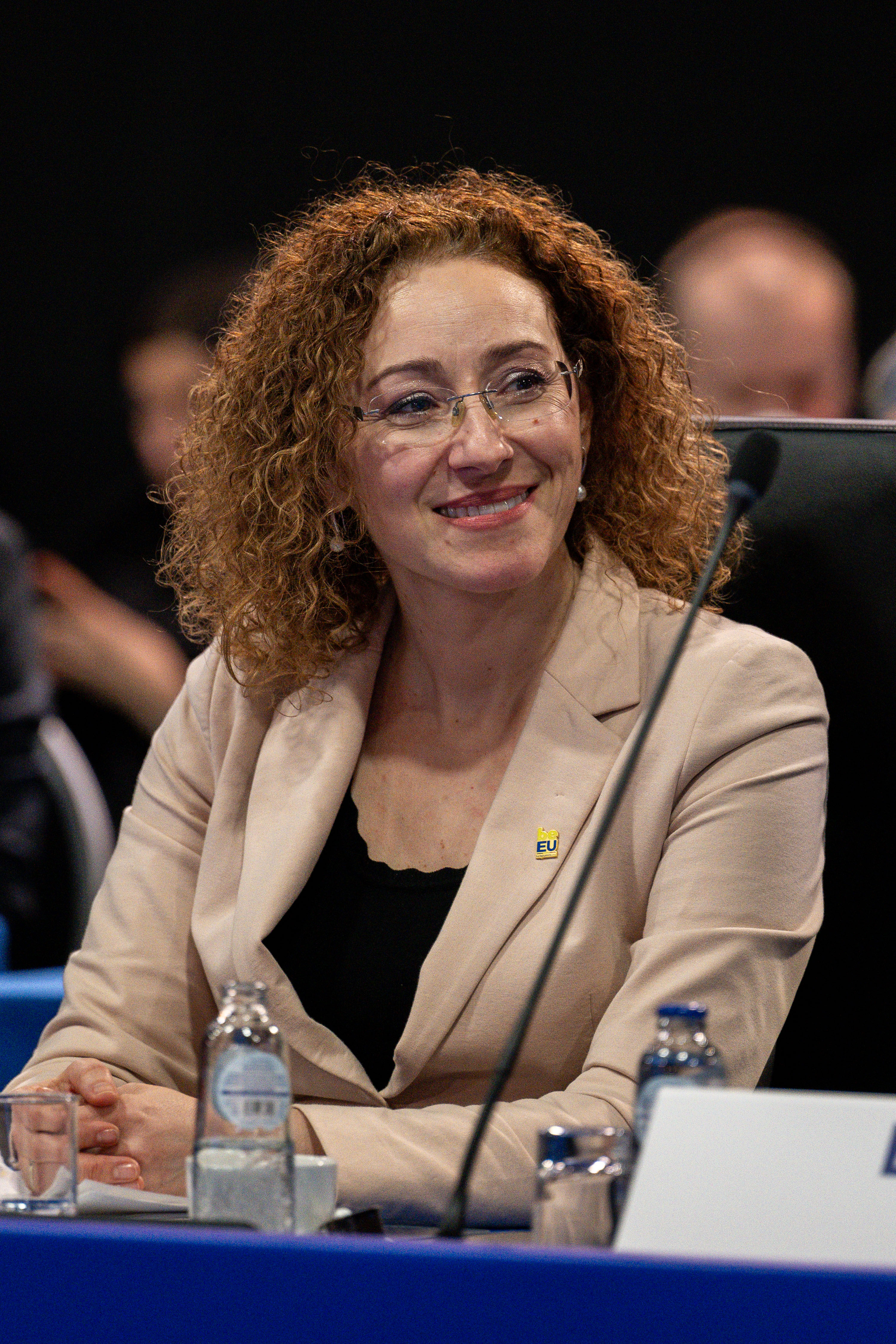
- Shalapatova in 2024

Ministry of Labour and Social Policy
- In office 6 June 2023 – 9 April 2024
- Prime Minister: Nikolay Denkov
- Preceded by: Lazar Lazarov
- Succeeded by: Ivaylo Ivanov

Personal details
- Born: September 23, 1974
- Party: Independent
- Children: 2
- Occupation: Politician; activist

Ivanka Nikolova Shalapatova (Bulgarian: Иванка Николова Шалапатова; born in September 1974) is a Bulgarian politician, serving as Minister of Labour and Social Policy since 2023 in the Denkov Government.

== Life ==
Shalapatova holds a master's degree in Bulgarian and English philology. She earned her PhD in 2020.

In 1997, Shalapatova started working for the British charity European Children's Trust, and after its withdrawal from Bulgaria in 2000, she became the head of its successor, For Our Children.

In 2013, she held the position of deputy minister of labour and social policy.

In June 2023, she joined the Denkov government as minister of Labour and Social Policy.
