= Rumyana Bachvarova =

Bulgarian GERB politician

- Румяна Бъчварова
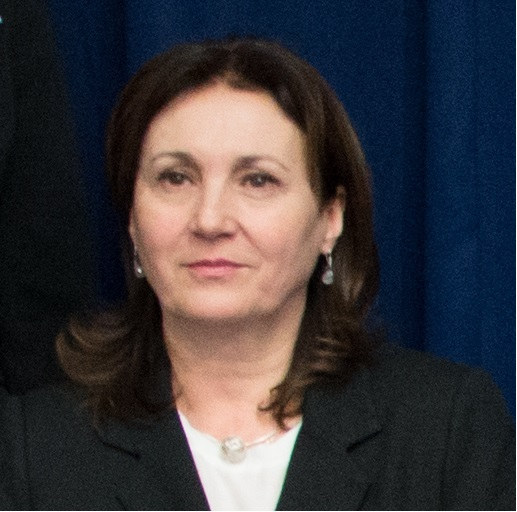
- Bachvarova in 2015

Personal details
- Born: 13 March 1959 (age 67) Shipka, Bulgaria
- Profession: Politician

Rumyana Bachvarova (Bulgarian: Румяна Бъчварова; born 13 March 1959) is a Bulgarian GERB politician.

== Political career ==
Since November 7, 2014 she was Deputy Prime Minister in charge of coalition policy and state administration in the Second Borisov Cabinet. On 11 March 2015, the Minister of Interior Veselin Vuchkov was replaced by Rumyana Bachvarova, who also kept her position as a Deputy PM. She has been credited with being a unifying force when it comes to the different parties supporting the Second Borisov government.
