= Spiro Ristovski =

Minister of Education and Science of Macedonia
- In office 29 May 2013 – 19 June 2014
- President: Gjorge Ivanov
- Prime Minister: Nikola Gruevski
- Preceded by: Panche Kralev
- Succeeded by: Abdylaqim Ademi

Personal details
- Born: 6 July 1981 (age 44) Skopje, SFR Yugoslavia, (today North Macedonia)
- Citizenship: Macedonian
- Party: VMRO–DPMNE

Spiro Ristovski (Macedonian: Спиро Ристовски) (born 6 July 1981) is a Macedonian politician. He was the Macedonian Minister of Education and Science from 29 May 2013 to 19 June 2014.

== Education ==
2005 — Graduated from the Faculty of Law “Justinian I”, at the Ss. Cyril and Methodius University of Skopje.

== Professional experience ==
2005–2006 — Legal representative in the private sector.

2007–2008 — Deputy Manager of the Agency for Supervision of Fully Funded Pension Insurance — MAPAS.

2008–2011 — Deputy Minister of Labor and Social Policy.

2011–2013 — Minister of Labor and Social Policy.

== Role in the storming of the Macedonian Parliament ==
In 2021, Ristovski was convicted in 2021 and sentenced to up to 6.5 years' imprisonment for his role in organizing the 2017 storming of the Macedonian Parliament. He was ordered released by a court in Skopje in 2025, citing a 2018 amnesty law.
