= Second Donev Government =

Government of Bulgaria (Feb–Jun 2023)

Donev Government
- 101st Cabinet of Bulgaria
- 2023
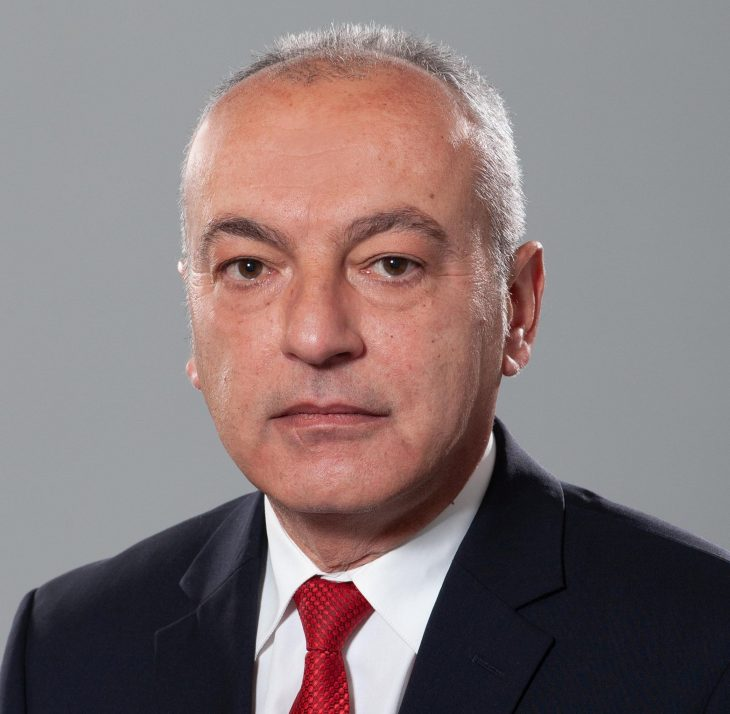
- Portrait of the Prime Minister Galab Donev
- Date formed: 2 February 2023
- Date dissolved: 6 June 2023

People and organisations
- President: Rumen Radev
- Prime Minister: Galab Donev
- Deputy Prime Ministers: Lazar Lazarov, Ind.; Hristo Alexiev, Ind.; Ivan Demerdzhiev, Ind.; Atanas Pekanov, Ind.
- No. of ministers: 20 (17 men and 3 women)
- Status in legislature: Caretaker Government

History
- Legislature term: 48th National Assembly
- Predecessor: First Donev Government
- Successor: Denkov Government

The Second Donev Government was the 101st cabinet of Bulgaria. It was appointed by President Rumen Radev on 2 February 2023.

== Cabinet ==
Cabinet
Portfolio	Minister	Took office	Left office	Party
Prime Minister	Galab Donev	2 February 2023	6 June 2023	Independent
Deputy Prime Minister for Social and Policies, Labour Minister	Lazar Lazarov	2 February 2023	6 June 2023	Independent
Deputy Prime Minister for Internal Order and Security, Interior Minister	Ivan Demerdzhiev	2 February 2023	6 June 2023	Independent
Deputy Prime Minister for EU Funds Management	Atanas Pekanov	2 February 2023	6 June 2023	Independent
Finance Minister	Rositsa Atanasova Velkova-Zheleva	2 February 2023	6 June 2023	Independent
Defence Minister	Dimitar Stoyanov	2 February 2023	6 June 2023	Independent
Foreign Minister	Nikolay Milkov	2 February 2023	3 May 2023	Independent
Foreign Minister	Ivan Kondov	3 May 2023	6 June 2023	Independent
Justice Minister	Krum Zarkov	2 February 2023	6 June 2023	BSPzB
Health Minister	Asen Medzhidiev	2 February 2023	6 June 2023	Independent
Education Minister	Sasho Penov	2 February 2023	6 June 2023	Independent
Agriculture and Foods Minister	Yavor Gechev	2 February 2023	6 June 2023	BSPzB
Deputy Prime Minister for Economic Policies and Transport and Communications Minister	Hristo Alexiev	2 February 2023	6 June 2023	Independent
Environment and Waters Minister	Rositsa Karamfilova-Blagova	2 February 2023	6 June 2023	Independent
Energy Minister	Rosen Hristov	2 February 2023	6 June 2023	Independent
Tourism Minister	Ilin Dimitrov	2 February 2023	6 June 2023	PP
Economy Minister	Nikola Stoyanov	2 February 2023	6 June 2023	Independent
Regional Development Minister	Ivan Shishkov	2 February 2023	6 June 2023	Independent
Culture Minister	Nayden Todorov	2 February 2023	6 June 2023	Independent
Youth and Sports Minister	Vesela Lecheva	2 February 2023	6 June 2023	BSPzB
Minister of e-Government	Georgi Todorov	2 February 2023	6 June 2023	Independent
Minister of Innovation and Growth	Aleksandur Pulev	2 February 2023	6 June 2023	Independent

== Tenure ==
=== Changes within the civil service ===
According to information, spread by the press center of the Denkov Government a total of 13,211 employees of the ministries and their departments have been laid off during the caretaker governments of Prime Minister Galab Donev between August 2022 and June 2023.
