= Zaritsa Dinkova =

Bulgarian politician

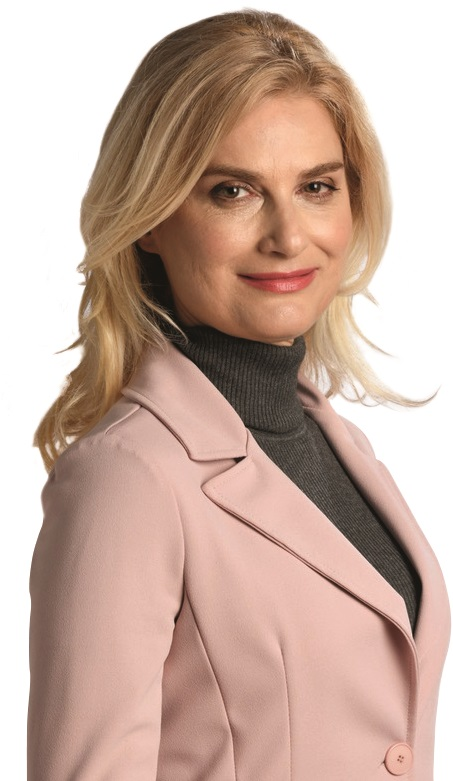
- Dinkova in 2024

Minister of Tourism
- In office 6 June 2023 – 9 April 2024
- Prime Minister: Nikolai Denkov
- Preceded by: Ilin Dimitrov
- Succeeded by: Evtim Miloshev

Personal details
- Party: Independent
- Other political affiliations: Green Movement (until November, 2023)
- Occupation: Politician; activist

Zaritsa Dinkova (Bulgarian: Зарица Динкова; born 12 February 1973) is a Bulgarian politician, serving as Minister of Tourism from 2023 to 2024 in the Denkov Government.

== Biography ==
Zaritsa Dinkova holds a master's degree in Diplomacy and international relations from the Complutense University in Madrid.

She was a senior adviser at the European Parliament. In 2021, she held the position of deputy minister of Foreign Affairs in the First and Second Yanev Government.

In June 2023, she joined the Denkov government as minister of tourism. She worked on collaboration among the southern European states and with Germany to promote tourism in Bulgaria.
