= Ministry of Education and Science =

A Ministry of Education and Science is a common form of government ministry popular in countries of Eastern Europe. Such bodies generally cover the functions of both a Ministry of Education and a Ministry of Science, overseeing the education of students, and scientific research.

Examples of such ministries include:

- Ministry of Education and Sciences (Albania), former name of the Ministry of Education, Sports and Youth
- Ministry of Education and Science (Armenia)
- Ministry of Education and Science (Bulgaria)
- Ministry of Science and Education (Croatia)
- Ministry of Education and Science of Georgia
- Ministry of Education and Science (Kazakhstan)
- Ministry of Education and Science (Lithuania)
- Ministry of Education and Science (Macedonia)
- Ministry of Education and Science (Mongolia)
- Ministry of Education and Science (Poland)
- Ministry of Education and Science (Russia)
- Ministry of Education and Science of Ukraine

== See also ==
- List of education ministries
- Ministry of Science
