= VMRO – People's Party =

Macedonian political party

VMRO – People's Party ВМРО - Народна Партија
- Leader: Ljubčo Georgievski
- Founded: 4 July 2004
- Split from: VMRO–DPMNE
- Headquarters: Skopje
- Ideology: National conservatism; Christian democracy; Pro-Europeanism; Atlanticism
- Political position: Centre-right to right-wing
- National affiliation: For a European Future
- European affiliation: European Conservatives and Reformists Party (regional partner, until 2025)
- International affiliation: Centrist Democrat International (formerly)
- Colours: Red, Yellow, Black
- Parliament: 0 / 120

Website
- www.vmro-np.org.mk

The Internal Macedonian Revolutionary Organization – People's Party (Macedonian: Внатрешна македонска револуционерна организација – Народна Партија, romanized: Vnatrešna makedonska revolucionerna organizacija – Narodna Partija), shortened as VMRO – People's Party (Macedonian: ВMPO–Народна Партија, romanized: VMRO – Narodna Partija) and VMRO–NP (Macedonian: ВMPO–НП), is a national-conservative political party in North Macedonia, founded by the former Prime Minister Ljubčo Georgievski, who split from the VMRO–DPMNE. The VMRO–NP was founded in Skopje on 4 July 2004. Vesna Janevska was elected as the party's first chairwoman. It is among the smaller parties of the country.

== History ==
VMRO–NP was founded on 4 July 2004 by former VMRO–DPMNE leader Ljubčo Georgievski due to personal and ideological differences with his successor Nikola Gruevski. Vesna Janevska became the party's first president. In the 2006 parliamentary election, VMRO–NP won 6.1% of the vote and 6 seats in the Assembly. In the 2011 parliamentary election, VMRO–NP received 28,500 votes (2.51%), losing all of its seats. In April 2007, Gjorgji Trendafilov became the party's leader. VMRO–NP remained an extra-parliamentary party until the 2020 parliamentary election, when it participated in the We Can alliance led by the Social Democratic Union of Macedonia (SDSM) and won one seat. Georgievski succeeded to the position of party president on 26 February 2012.

In the 2024 parliamentary elections, the party participated in a coalition led by SDSM and lost one seat.

== Ideology ==
According to Radio Free Europe/Radio Liberty, its party program resembles VMRO–DPMNE's program. The VMRO–NP's statute allowed dual membership in both parties. The party identifies itself as a right-wing conservative and patriotic party, with a Christian democratic orientation. It supports the Euro-Atlantic integration of North Macedonia.

== See also ==
- Category:VMRO – People's Party politicians
