= Bozhidar Lukarski =

Bulgarian politician and lawyer

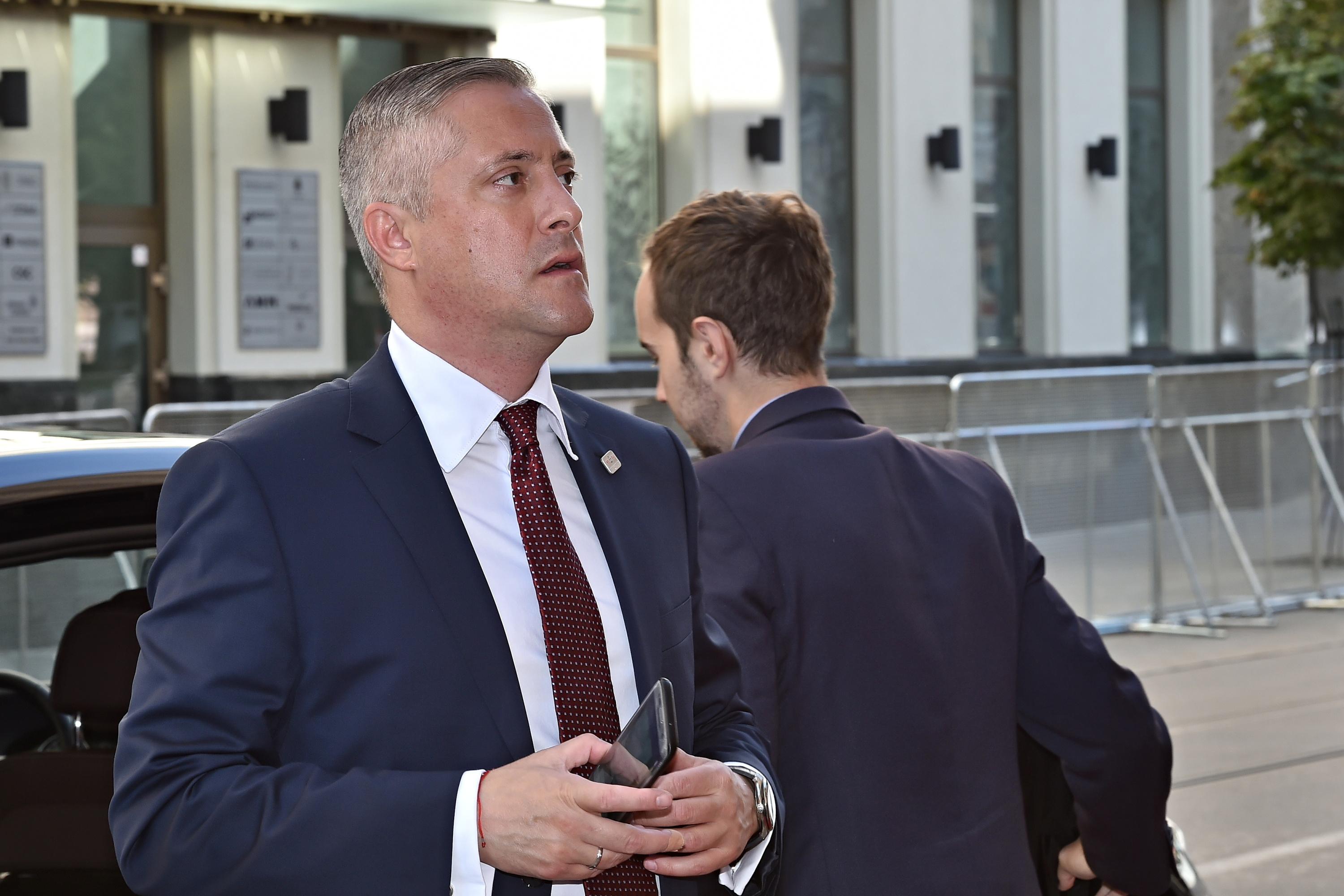

Personal details
- Born: 23 June 1972 (age 54) Pernik, Bulgaria
- Party: Union of Democratic Forces
- Profession: Politician, lawyer

Bozhidar Lukarski (Bulgarian: Божидар Лукарски) (born 23 June 1972 in Pernik) is a Bulgarian politician and lawyer. He was the leader of Union of Democratic Forces from 2013 to 2018. From November 7, 2014 to January 27, 2017 he was the Minister of Economy in the Second Borisov Cabinet.
