= Vesna Janevska =

Macedonian pathologist and politician (born 1958)

- Весна Јаневска
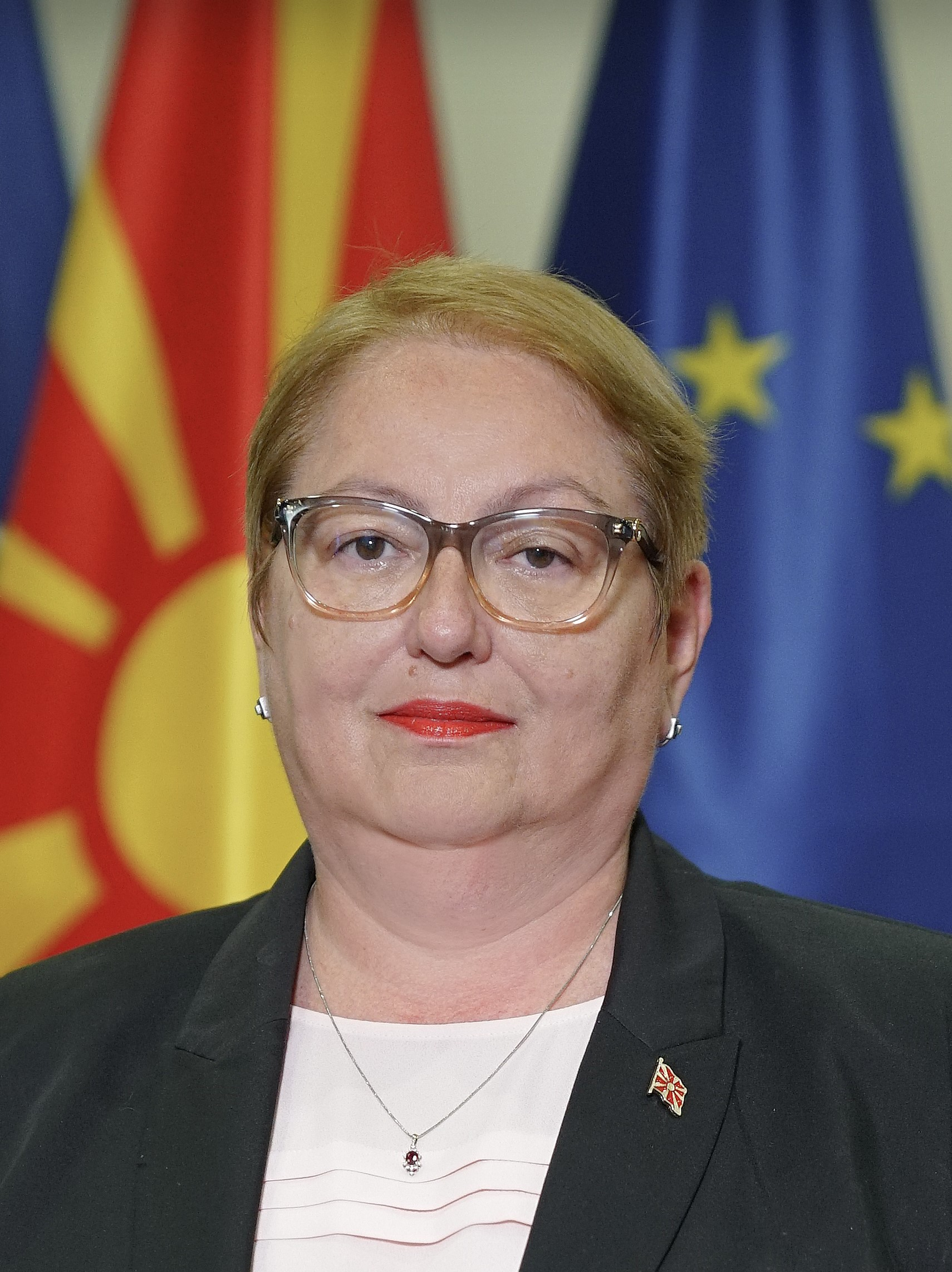
- Official portrait, 2024

Minister of Education and Science
- Incumbent
- Assumed office 23 June 2024
- Prime Minister: Hristijan Mickoski
- Preceded by: Jeton Shaqiri

Personal details
- Born: 27 June 1958 (age 68) Skopje, Socialist Republic of Macedonia, Yugoslavia
- Party: VMRO – People's Party
- Education: Ss. Cyril and Methodius University of Skopje

Vesna Janevska (Macedonian: Весна Јаневска; 27 June 1958) is a Macedonian pathologist, academic and politician. She has been serving as Minister of Education and Science of North Macedonia since 2024 and was the first woman leader of the VMRO – People's Party.

== Early life and education ==
Janevska was born on 27 June 1958 in Skopje, Socialist Republic of Macedonia, then Yugoslavia. She holds a Doctor of Medicine degree and a degree in pathology from the Ss. Cyril and Methodius University of Skopje.

== Career ==
She is a full professor at the Ss. Cyril and Methodius University of Skopje since 2011. In July 2004, Janevska was named the first woman leader of the newly founded VMRO – People's Party.

On 24 June 2024, she became Minister of Education and Science of North Macedonia, succeeding Jeton Shaqiri. On that day, in an interview, Janevska herself announced the plan for comprehensive reform and modernisation of education, prioritising inclusive education and the promotion of scientific research.
