= Denkov Government =

Government of Bulgaria (2023–2024)

- 102nd Cabinet of Bulgaria
- 2023–2024
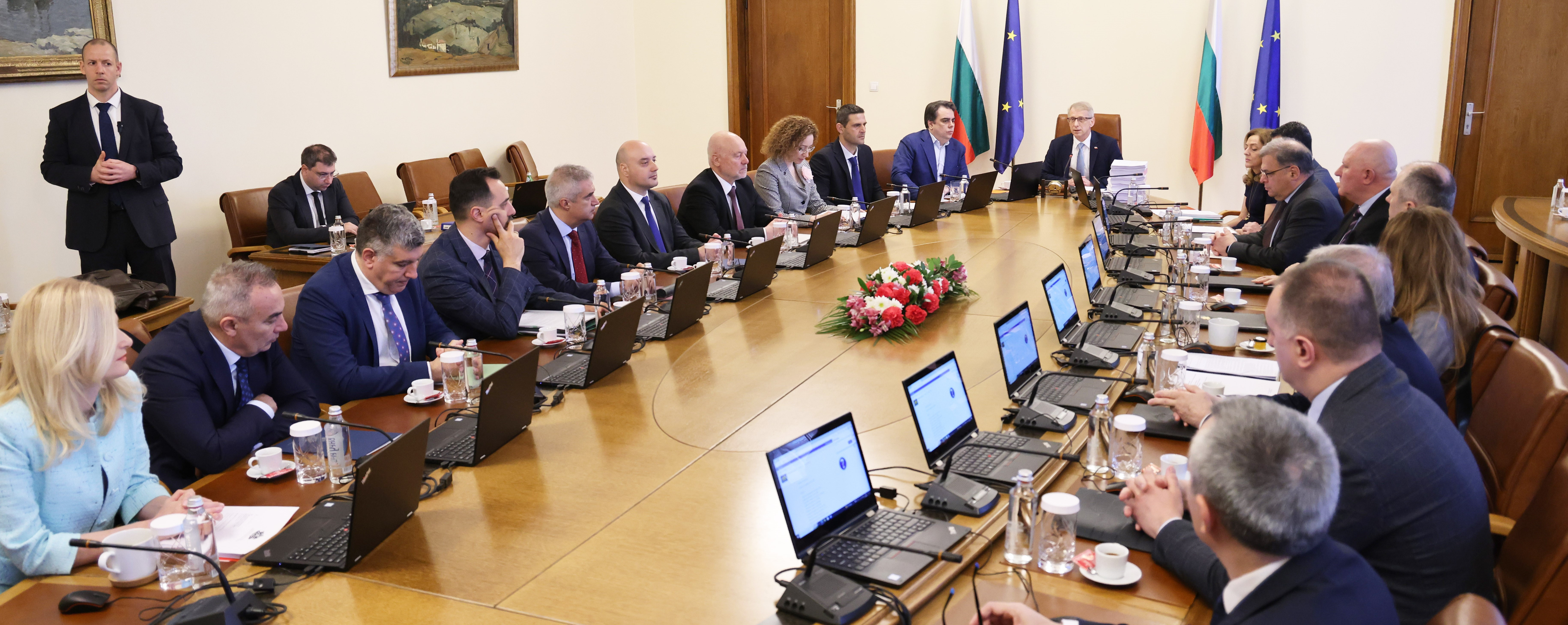
- Denkov government meeting
- Date formed: 6 June 2023
- Date dissolved: 9 April 2024

People and organisations
- President: Rumen Radev
- Prime Minister: Nikolai Denkov, PP–DB
- Deputy Prime Minister: Mariya Gabriel, GERB–SDS
- No. of ministers: 20
- Ministers removed: 0
- Total no. of members: 20
- Member parties: PP–DB; GERB—SDS
- Status in legislature: Majority coalition
- Opposition parties: Revival; BSP; ITN
- Opposition leaders: Kostadin Kostadinov; Korneliya Ninova; Slavi Trifonov

History
- Election: 2023
- Legislature term: 49th National Assembly
- Predecessor: Donev II
- Successor: Glavchev I

The Denkov Government was the 102nd cabinet of Bulgaria. It was approved by the parliament on 6 June 2023, and was a majority coalition of GERB and PP–DB. Per the coalition agreement, it was set to be a rotation government, where PP–DB's Nikolai Denkov would start with the premiership, with GERB's Mariya Gabriel serving as deputy prime minister, and after nine months, the two would switch positions. Per the agreement, Denkov and his cabinet resigned on 6 March 2024 in preparation for Gabriel to form her cabinet, although the Denkov government stayed on in a caretaker capacity until a new cabinet was formed.

On 20 March 2024, the planned government rotation and signing of a renewed government manifest for the next nine months had failed. A call for further negotiations to attempt rescuing the failed rotation agreement, was left unmet during March 20-21; but a last final negotiation round began on March 22. The two parties GERB and Movement for Rights and Freedoms concluded on March 24, that the latest negotiation round now also had failed, leaving the President of Bulgaria no other choice than for snap elections to be called.

The Bulgarian President Rumen Radev, announced after having concluded a further second and third failed attempt to form a government among the elected parties, that he would sign a decree on 9 April 2024 approving Dimitar Glavchev as a new caretaker prime minister, along with a decree approving his proposed caretaker government, and at the same time he would sign a decree setting the date for new early elections on 9 June 2024.

== Investiture ==
Investiture vote
Ballot →	6 June 2023
Yes: GERB—SDS (68); PP–DB (61); DPS (2)	131 / 240
No: Revival (37); BSPzB (19); ITN (11); GERB—SDS (1); Independents (1)	69 / 240
Abstentions: None	0 / 240
Absentees: DPS (34); BSPzB (4); PP–DB (2)	40 / 240
Source: Sofia Globe

== Cabinet ==
The cabinet consisted of the following ministries:

Portfolio	Minister	Took office	Left office	Party
Prime Minister	Nikolai Denkov	6 June 2023	9 April 2024	PP–DB
Deputy Prime Minister; Minister of Foreign Affairs	Mariya Gabriel	6 June 2023	9 April 2024	GERB–SDS
Minister of Finance	Assen Vassilev	6 June 2023	9 April 2024	PP–DB
Minister of Interior	Kalin Stoyanov	6 June 2023	9 April 2024	Independent
Minister of Regional Development and Public Works	Andrey Tsekov	6 June 2023	9 April 2024	PP–DB
Minister of Labour and Social Policy	Ivanka Shalapatova	6 June 2023	9 April 2024	Independent
Minister of Defense	Todor Tagarev	6 June 2023	9 April 2024	Independent
Minister of Justice	Atanas Slavov	6 June 2023	9 April 2024	PP–DB
Minister of Education and Science	Galin Tsokov	6 June 2023	9 April 2024	Independent
Minister of Health	Hristo Hinkov	6 June 2023	9 April 2024	PP–DB
Minister of Culture	Krastyu Krastev	6 June 2023	9 April 2024	Independent
Minister of Environment and Waters	Julian Popov	6 June 2023	9 April 2024	Independent
Minister of Agriculture and Food	Kiril Marinov Vatev	6 June 2023	9 April 2024	Independent
Minister of Transport and Communications	Georgi Gvozdeykov	6 June 2023	9 April 2024	PP–DB
Minister of Economy and Industry	Bogdan Bogdanov	6 June 2023	9 April 2024	Independent
Minister of Innovation and Growth	Milena Stoycheva	6 June 2023	9 April 2024	Independent
Minister of Energy	Rumen Radev	6 June 2023	9 April 2024	Independent
Minister of Electronic Governance	Alexander Yolovski	6 June 2023	9 April 2024	Independent
Minister of Tourism	Zaritsa Dinkova	6 June 2023	9 April 2024	PP–DB
Minister of Youth and Sports	Dimitar Iliev	6 June 2023	9 April 2024	Independent

In October 2023 three of the opposition parties in the 49th National Assembly of Bulgaria, "Vazrazhdane", the Bulgarian Socialist Party (BSP) and There Is Such a People (ITN), submitted a first motion of no confidence against the Denkov cabinet over its policy in the energy sector. The government survived the no-confidence vote on 13 October. The government was supported by 143 members of parliament from the political groups of GERB, PP–DB and DPS.

== Tenure ==
=== Transition of power (June 2023) ===
Upon the completion of the investiture vote in parliament, the Donev Caretaker Cabinet began the procedure for the transition of power to the newly appointed Denkov government.

On the 6th of June, Prime Minister-Elect Denkov met with outgoing Caretaker Prime Minister Donev, in an official ceremony. During the ceremony, Donev expressed hope that the regular cabinet would continue working on the development of the country and stated that he believed that the new government had the same "strategic priorities" as the outgoing caretaker one. Denkov, on the other hand, expressed criticisms of the action of the Caretaker Cabinet, specifically accusing the Caretaker Cabinet of sabotaging the transfer of power by submitting the resignations of all ministerial staff, including vice-ministers.

=== Vote of no confidence (October 2023) ===
Vote of No Confidence
Ballot →	13 October 2023
Yes: Revival (37); BSPzB (23); ITN (10); Independents (1)	71 / 240
No: PP-DB (62); GERB-SDS (48); DPS (33)	143 / 240
Abstentions: None	0 / 240
Absentees: GERB-SDS (21); DPS (3); ITN (1); PP–DB (1)	26 / 240
Source: DarikNews

=== Vote of no confidence (November 2023) ===
Vote of No Confidence
Ballot →	22 November 2023
Yes: Revival (35); BSPzB (23); ITN (11); Rumen Hristov (SDS) (1); Independents (1)	71 / 240
No: GERB-SDS (63); PP-DB (58); DPS (34)	155 / 240
Abstentions: None	0 / 240
Absentees: GERB-SDS (5); PP-DB (5); DPS (2); Revival (2)	14 / 240
Source: National Assembly

=== Resignation ===
On the 5 March 2024, PM Denkov officially submitted the resignation of his cabinet to the National Assembly, saying the decision was in the spirit of the governing deal which had been reached between GERB and PP–DB earlier.

Despite opposition from GERB, Denkov's resignation ended up being voted on the next day (6 March) due to the insistence of PP–DB.

The motion for the resignation of Denkov's government ended up being supported by 216 MPs, which is the highest level of support for such a motion in Bulgarian history. Denkov promised that the government would continue as an acting government until the completion of the government-formation process.

=== Tenure as Acting Government (6 March - 9 April) ===
During the first three weeks of the tenure as acting government, the first round of negotiations took place for a new government to be formed.

On 20 March 2024, the planned government rotation and signing of a renewed government manifest for the next nine months had failed. A call for further negotiations to attempt rescuing the failed rotation agreement, was left unmet during March 20-21; but a last final negotiation round began on March 22. The two parties GERB and Movement for Rights and Freedoms concluded on March 24, that the latest negotiation round now also had failed, leaving the President of Bulgaria no other choice than for snap elections to be called.

The Bulgarian constitution declares that after a first failed attempt of government formation, the President must then ask the second-largest party in parliament (PP–DB) to try and form a government; and if this second attempt also fails he shall then give a final third attempt to any remaining party of his choosing. If all three stages of negotiations fail, the President will then appoint a new caretaker government to replace the acting government, and the main task of the caretaker government will be to organize free and fair elections within two months. New elections are expected most likely to be held on 9 June 2024, coinciding with the European Parliament election on the same day.

PP–DB declared on March 26, that they would accept giving a second negotiation mandate a try, but it would be limited to a negotiation attempt to form a government together with GERB–SDS that fully respected their original rotation agreement of 2023. The proposed negotiation framework would be for GERB–SDS to sign the reform agreement negotiated with PP–DB, while GERB–SDS nominates a mutually acceptable next Prime Minister, and the current structure of the cabinet has to be preserved. If GERB–SDS by a written letter refused this PP–DB proposal, the second negotiation mandate would immediately be returned unfulfilled to the President. A few hours later, GERB–SDS refused this proposal and called for early elections.

On 27 March, PP–DB officially returned the second negotiation mandate incomplete to the President, requesting that the President schedule early legislative elections on the same day as the 2024 European Parliament election. President Radev decided the following day to give the third mandate for an attempted government formation to ITN, the smallest party in the 49th National Assembly. The third mandate was immediately returned incomplete by ITN, without wasting any time on fruitless negotiation attempts.

Under Article 99 of the Constitution, when no agreement on formation of a government has been reached after all three attempted negotiation mandates have been tried, the President, in consultation with the parliamentary groups and on the proposal of the candidate for caretaker prime minister, appoints a caretaker government and schedules new early elections within two months from its inauguration. On 29 March, the President appointed the Chairman of the National Audit Office, Dimitar Glavchev, as a candidate for caretaker prime minister; and he was granted a one week deadline - at 6 April - to propose the composition of the caretaker government.

On 5 April, Dimitar Glavchev presented his proposal for the caretaker government, and after consultations being held the same day on whether it could be approved by the representatives of all political parties from the 49th National Assembly, the President announced he would sign a decree on 9 April 2024 approving the caretaker PM and his caretaker government, and at the same time he would sign a decree setting the date for new parliamentary elections to 9 June 2024. The acting government will hereby be replaced by the new caretaker government, as of 9 April 2024.

== Approval rating ==
Denkov Government Approval Rating
Polling Firm	Fieldwork date	Approval	Disapproval	Unsure/no opinion	Net
Gallup	27 Feb.–3 March 2024	15%	75%	10%	−60
Alpha Research	27 Feb.–3 March 2024	21%	53%	26%	−32
Trend	17–24 Jan. 2024	22%	70%	8%	−48
Alpha Research	22–30 Nov. 2023	21%	46%	33%	−25
MarketLinks	10–19 Nov. 2023	20%	60%	20%	−40
Trend	11–18 Nov. 2023	20%	71%	9%	−51
MarketLinks	26 Sept.–8 Oct. 2023	21%	53%	26%	−32
Trend	2-8 Sept. 2023	22%	68%	10%	−46
MarketLinks	11-18 Aug. 2023	20%	52%	25%	−32
Trend	4–11 July 2023	22%	64%	14%	−44
Gallup	29 Jun–9 July 2023	16.6%	69.7%	13.7%	−53
CAM	3–7 July 2023	31.2%	43.2%	N/A	−10
MarketLinks	22 Jun–2 July 2023	22%	48%	30%	−26
AlphaResearch	20–26 Jun 2023	20%	37%	43%	−17
Trend	10–16 Jun 2023	32%	43%	25%	−11
