= Krasimir Valchev =

Bulgarian politician

- Красимир Вълчев
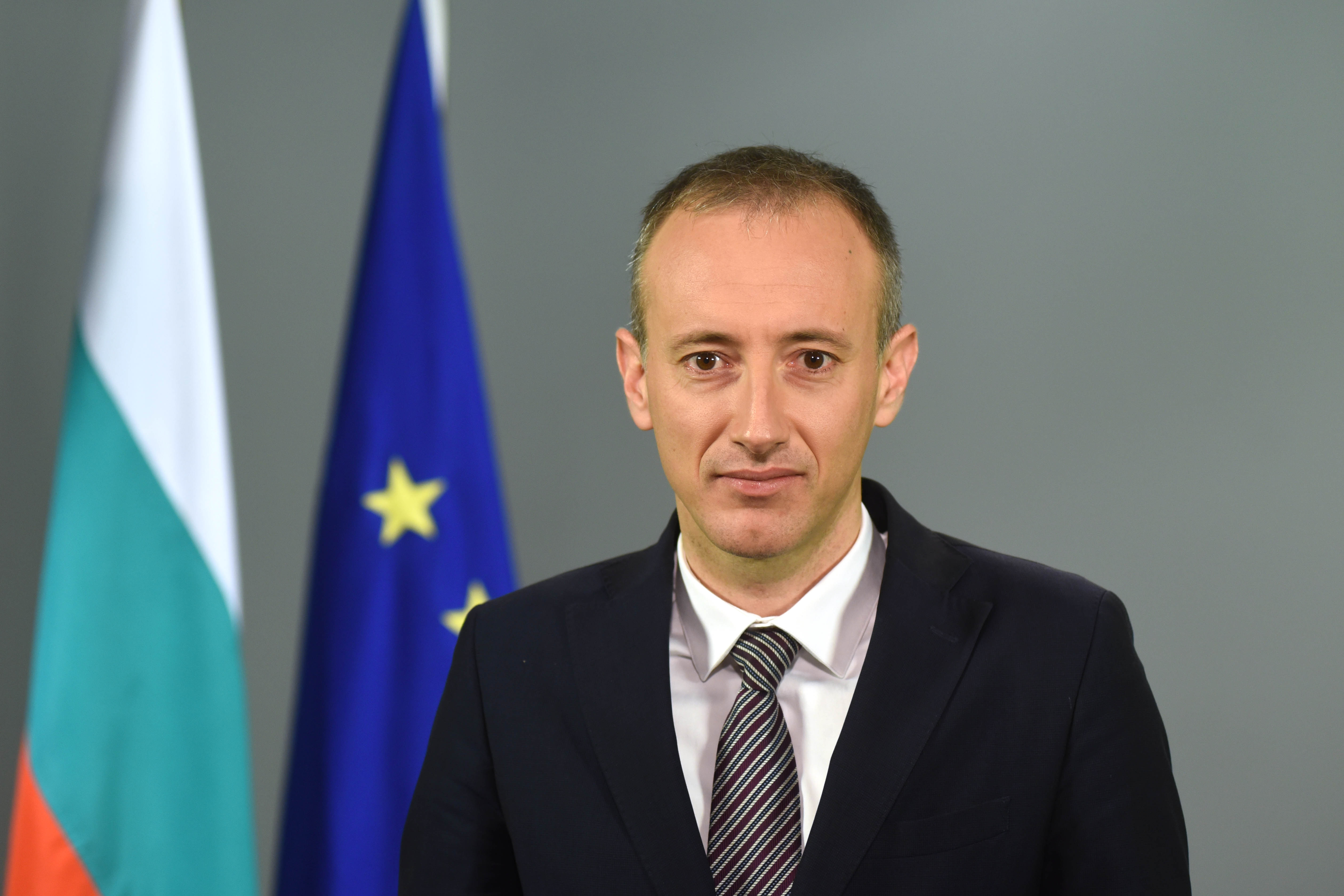
- Official portrait, 2021

Minister of Education and Science
- Incumbent
- Assumed office 16 January 2025
- Prime Minister: Rosen Zhelyazkov
- Preceded by: Galin Tsokov
- In office 4 May 2017 – 12 May 2021
- Prime Minister: Boyko Borisov
- Preceded by: Nikolai Denkov
- Succeeded by: Nikolai Denkov

Member of the National Assembly
- Incumbent
- Assumed office 21 July 2021
- Constituency: 27th MMC - Stara Zagora

Personal details
- Born: 9 June 1975 (age 51) Sofia, PR Bulgaria
- Party: GERB
- Spouse: Liliya Valcheva
- Children: 1
- Education: University of Economics Varna
- Occupation: politician

Krasimir Georgiev Valchev is a Bulgarian politician and a Member of the National Assembly. A member of the GERB political party, he previously served as the Minister of Education and Science under Prime Minister Boyko Borisov.
