= Ministry of Education and Science (North Macedonia) =

Government ministry of North Macedonia

- Министерство за образование и наука (Macedonian); Ministria e Arsimit dhe Shkencës (Albanian)
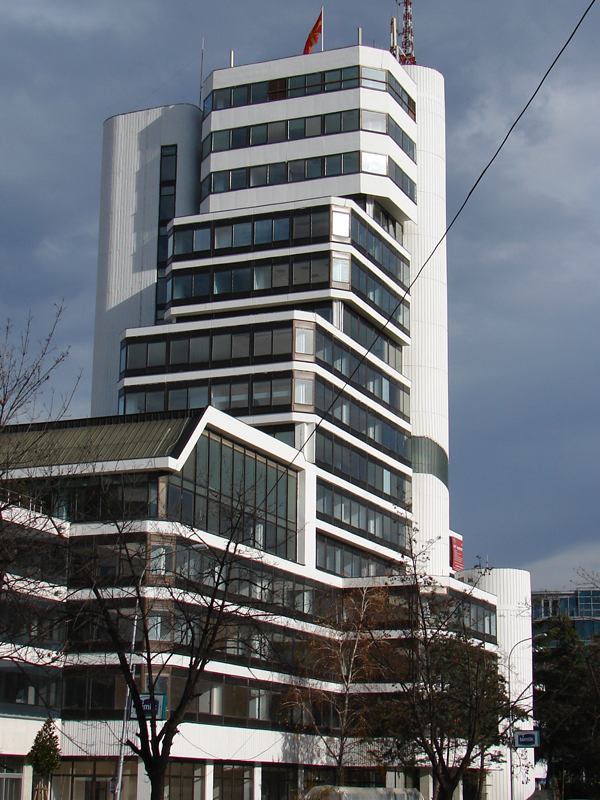
- The building which houses the Ministry

Agency overview
- Formed: 1991 (As a Ministry of modern Republic of Macedonia)
- Jurisdiction: Government of North Macedonia
- Headquarters: Skopje, North Macedonia
- Minister responsible: Vesna Janevska, Minister of Education and Science
- Child agencies: Pedagogical Services Office; Bureau for Development of the Education; National Educational Inspectorate; Authority for development and upgrading the education in the ethnicities' tongues
- Website: www.mon.gov.mk

The Ministry of Education and Science is a ministry of the Government of the Republic of North Macedonia, by virtue of section 23 of the Law of Organization and Acting of the Organs of State's Administration (Law Gazette of Republic of Macedonia no. 59/2000 from 21. July 2000). The Ministry does the work concerning:

- upbringing and/or education of any type or degree
- organization, financing, development and upgrading of the upbringing, education and science
- upbringing and education of Macedonian workers' children in foreign countries
- verification of different professions and/or profiles in the field of education
- pupils' and students' standards
- technological advances, IT, information systems, and technical culture
- international scientific and/or technical collaboration, etc.

As sectors of the Ministry, exist the following institutions:

- Pedagogical Services Office
- Bureau for Development of the Education
- Authority for development and upgrading the education in the ethnicities' tongues
- National Educational Inspectorate

== Ministers ==
№	Portrait	Name (born-died)	Mandate commenced on	Mandate finished on	Length (in days)	Party/Coalition	Government
of education (1991–2000)
1		Dimitar Dimitrov (b. 1937)	20 March 1991	5 September 1992	535	Independent	First Government of Macedonia in 1991
2		Dimitar Bajaldžiev (b. 1932)	5 September 1992	20 December 1994	836	SDSM	Second Government of Macedonia in 1992
3		Emilija Simoska	20 December 1994	23 February 1996	430	SDSM	Third Government of Macedonia in 1994
4		Sofija Todorova (b. 1947)	23 February 1996	30 November 1998	1011	Independent	Third Government of Macedonia in 1994
5		Nenad Novkovski (b. 1958)	30 November 1998	28 December 1999	393	VMRO-DPMNE	Fourth Government of Macedonia in 1998
6		Gale Galev (b. 1943)	28 December 1999	31 July 2000	216	Independent	Fourth Government of Macedonia in 1998
of science (1991–2000)
1		Georgi Efremov (b. 1932)	20 March 1991	5 September 1992	535	Independent	First Government of Macedonia in 1991
2		Aslan Selmani (1945–2011)	5 September 1992	20 December 1994	836	Independent	Second Government of Macedonia in 1992
3		Sofija Todorova (b. 1947)	20 December 1994	23 February 1996	430	Independent	Third Government of Macedonia in 1994
(2)		Aslan Selmani (1945–2011) (2nd mandate)	23 February 1996	30 November 1998	1011	Independent	Third Government of Macedonia in 1994
4		Merie Rushani (b. 1958)	30 November 1998	28 December 1999	393	PDSH	Fourth Government of Macedonia in 1998
5		Nenad Novkovski (b. 1958)	28 December 1999	31 July 2000	216	Independent	Fourth Government of Macedonia in 1998
of Education and Science (2000–present)
1		Gale Galev (b. 1943)	31 July 2000	1 November 2000	93	Independent	Fourth Government of Macedonia in 1998
2		Nenad Novkovski (b. 1958)	1 November 2000	1 November 2001	365	Independent	Fourth Government of Macedonia in 1998
3		Azis Polozhani (b. 1957)	1 November 2001	27 August 2006	1760	BDI	Fifth Government of Macedonia in 2002
4		Sulejman Rushiti (b. 1972)	27 August 2006	27 July 2008	700	PDSH	Sixth Government of Republic of Macedonia in 2006
5		Pero Stojanovski (b. 1970)	27 July 2008	10 July 2009	348	VMRO-DPMNE	Seventh Government of Macedonia in 2008
6		Nikola Todorov (b. 1979)	10 July 2009	5 June 2011	695	VMRO-DPMNE	Seventh Government of Macedonia in 2008
7		Panche Kralev (b. 1981)	28 July 2011	28 May 2013	670	VMRO-DPMNE	Eight Government of Macedonia in 2011
8		Spiro Ristovski	29 May 2013	19 June 2014	387	VMRO-DPMNE	Ninth Government of Macedonia in 2013
9		Abdylaqim Ademi	20 June 2014	5 April 2016	655	DUI	Tenth Government of Macedonia in 2014
10		Pishtar Lutfiu	5 April 2016	1 June 2017	422	DUI	Eleventh Government of Macedonia in 2016
11		Renata Deskoska	1 June 2017	1 June 2018	365	SDSM	Twelfth Government of Macedonia in 2017
12		Arbër Ademi	1 June 2018	30 August 2020	790	DUI	Thirteenth Government of Macedonia in 2018
13		Pavel Romanenko (b. 1994)	30 August 2020	17 January 2022	505	VMRO-DPMNE	Fourteenth Government of Macedonia in 2020
14		Jeton Shaqiri	17 January 2022	23 June 2024	888	DUI	Fourteenth Government of Macedonia in 2022
