= Anton Stankov =

Bulgarian politician (1966–2026)

- Антон Станков

Minister of Justice
- In office 24 July 2001 – 17 August 2005
- Prime Minister: Simeon Sakskoburggotski
- Preceded by: Teodosii Simeonov
- Succeeded by: Georgi Petkanov

Personal details
- Born: Anton Iliev Stankov; 17 February 1966 Yambol, Bulgaria
- Died: 13 August 2026 (aged 60) Sofia, Bulgaria
- Party: NDSV
- Education: Sofia University
- Occupation: Judge

Anton Iliev Stankov (Bulgarian: Антон Илиев Станков; 17 February 1966 – 13 August 2026) was a Bulgarian politician. A member of the National Movement for Stability and Progress, he served as Minister of Justice from 2001 to 2005 and the Chairman of the Supreme Judicial Council during the same period.

Stankov died in Sofia on 13 August 2026, at the age of 60.
