= Atanas Slavov (politician) =

Bulgarian politician (born 1979)

- Атанас Славов
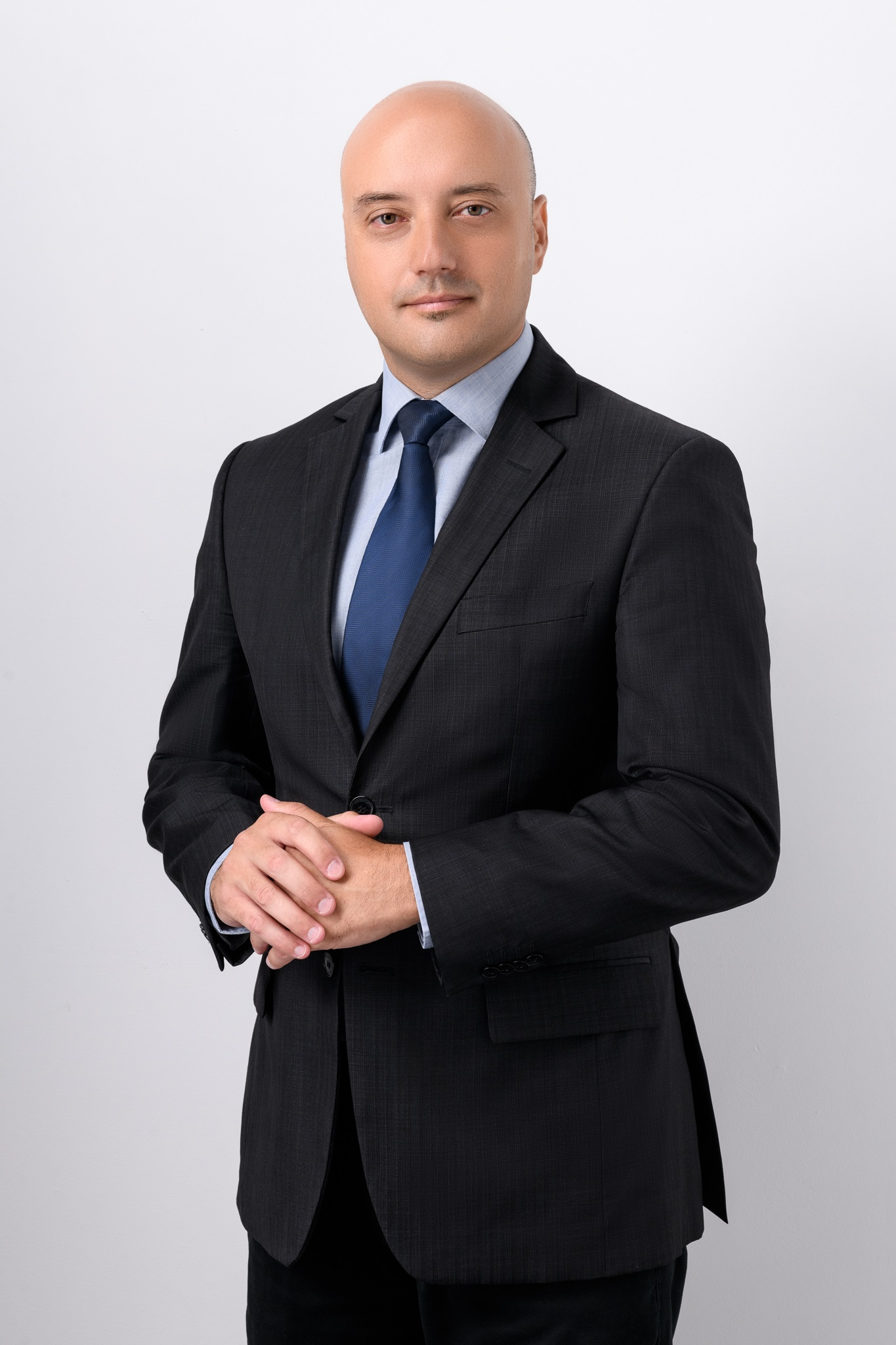
- Official portrait, 2023

Minister of Justice
- In office 6 June 2023 – 9 April 2024
- Prime Minister: Nikolay Denkov
- Preceded by: Krum Zarkov
- Succeeded by: Mariya Pavlova

Member of the National Assembly
- In office 15 April 2021 – 6 June 2023
- Constituency: 27th MMC - Stara Zagora

Personal details
- Born: 3 December 1979 (age 46) Usogorsk, USSR
- Party: Democratic Bulgaria
- Education: Sofia University
- Occupation: Politician; lawyer

Atanas Vladislavov Slavov (Bulgarian: Атанас Владиславов Славов) is a Bulgarian politician who served as Minister of Justice from 2023 to 2024. A member of the DB party, he was previously a Member of the National Assembly from 2021 to 2023.

== Early life and education ==
Atanas Slavov was born on December 3, 1979, in Usogorsk, Komi, USSR. He graduated in law at Sofia University. He obtained a PhD in constitutional law from Sofia University and in law from the University of Glasgow. At the beginning of his professional career, he worked as a lawyer.

== Political career ==
=== Early political career (2014-2016) ===
Slavov became an advisor on constitutional affairs to the then-Minister of Justice Hristo Ivanov (2014-2015) and an advisor on legislative affairs to the Minister of Interior (2016). He was a member of the team that drafted the amendments to the Constitution in 2015.

=== Member of the National Assembly (2021-2023) ===
Slavov was among the founders of the Yes, Bulgaria! political party in 2017, led by the former Minister of Justice Hristo Ivanov, which, in 2018, launched the Democratic Bulgaria electoral alliance, together with the Democrats for a Strong Bulgaria and the Green Movement.
During the Bulgarian political crisis, the country held 5 consecutive parliamentary elections due to the inability of the political parties in the National Assembly to form a government. Nevertheless, Slavov was elected as a member of the Assembly in each one of the elections. In his tenure, he provided his legal expertise and was a notable member of the legal affairs committee.

=== Minister of Justice (2023-2024) ===
A consensus on a government was finally reached on June 6, 2023, between the GERB-SDS and PP-DB parliamentary groups. It was said to be a rotation government, beginning with the premiership of Nikolay Denkov, followed by that of Mariya Gabriel after 9 months. Despite the majority of the government's structure consisting of independents, some of its members, including Slavov, were representatives of their respective political parties.
Slavov's main priority was to work with his colleagues in the constitutional affairs committee at the National Assembly to draft and pass a constitutional amendments bill. The needed 2/3 supermajority was to be supplied by the GERB-SDS, PP-DB and DPS parliamentary groups. The proposed amendments were mainly focused on reforming the judicial branch by reducing the power of the General Prosecutor and making the process of their election more transparent. They also included a reform regarding the caretaker governments. The President would have to appoint a Prime Minister by choosing between the Speaker of the National Assembly, the Governor and Deputy Governor of the National Bank, the Head and Deputy Head of the Chamber of Audit or the Ombudsman and Deputy Ombudsman, instead of appointing anyone of their choice. A third major amendment was that Bulgarians with dual citizenship would now be able to serve as members of the National Assembly and the Government.
The bill was successfully passed on December 20, 2023.
