= Rositsa Velkova-Zheleva =

Bulgarian politician

Rositsa Atanasova Velkova-Zheleva (born 16 March 1972) (Bulgarian: Росица Атанасова Велкова-Желева) is a Bulgarian Independent politician, who served as Minister of Finance in the first and second Donev Governments and from 2 August 2022 to 6 June 2023.
