= Nadezhda Yordanova =

Bulgarian jurist and politician

- Надежда Йорданова
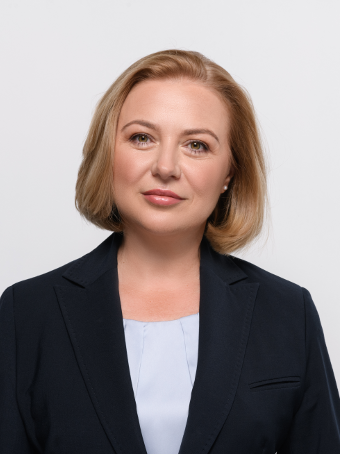

Member of the National Assembly
- Incumbent
- Assumed office 19 October 2022
- Constituency: 23rd MMC - Sofia
- In office 15 April 2021 – 13 December 2021
- Constituency: 23rd MMC - Sofia

Minister of Justice
- In office 13 December 2021 – 2 August 2022
- Prime Minister: Kiril Petkov
- Preceded by: Ivan Demerdzhiev
- Succeeded by: Krum Zarkov

Personal details
- Born: Nadezhda Georgieva Yordanova; 6 March 1973 (age 53) Kubrat, Bulgaria
- Party: Yes, Bulgaria!
- Children: 1
- Education: The University of Law; Sofia University
- Occupation: Politician; jurist

Nadezhda Georgieva Yordanova (Bulgarian: Надежда Йорданова; born 6 March 1973) is a Bulgarian jurist and politician who served as minister of justice in Kiril Petkov's government (December 2021-June 2022).

== Biography ==
Nadezhda Yordanova was born in Kubrat, Bulgaria on 6 March 1973. She studied at Sofia University, specializing in English trading rights at The University of Law. Since 2007 she has been a member of the bar in Razgrad.

On 13 December 2021 she was elected as Minister of Justice in the cabinet of Kiril Petkov.

She is married and has one child.
