= Screen Media (advertising company) =

Macedonian outdoor advertising company

- Industry: Mass media
- Founded: 2008
- Founder: Elmedin Ademi
- Headquarters: Kole Nedelkovski 61 lok 1, Skopje, North Macedonia
- Number of locations: 800 locations
- Area served: North Macedonia
- Key people: Elmedin Ademi, Chairman/CEO
- Products: Outdoor advertising
- Revenue: ▲€1.50 million (2016) (▲€1.50 million (2016))
- Owner: Ademi Holding - conglomerate holding company
- Website: screenmedia.mk

Screen Media is a Macedonian outdoor advertising company based in Skopje, North Macedonia. The company is part of Ademi Holding. It was founded in Skopje in 2008, established as an agency of outdoor advertising by Elmedin Ademi. Screen Media is one of the largest outdoor advertising companies in North Macedonia and has almost 800 locations in the country.

== History ==
Screen Media was founded in 2008 by Elmedin Ademi as an outdoor advertising company. The company initially began advertising in Skopje. In 2009, Screen Media partnered with Swiss Investors Business Development and then in March the company began expanding its network outside Skopje to other cities of Macedonia. The company won the tender of Veles Municipality for managing billboards in the town in 2010 and subsequently also won the tender with municipalities of Bitola, Struga, Debar and Prilep for managing billboards in the towns.

In 2011, the Municipality of Ohrid signed a contract with Screen Media worth 2 million denars. The same year the company became the pioneer of illuminated billboards in the municipality of Tetovo. As a new advertising space in the City of Skopje in June 2013 Skopje Mayor set up new unified billboards and city lights. Screen Media participated in the tender to manage the billboards and was given a 15-year contract of managing 200 billboards, 63 city lights and 12 LCD panels.

The revenue of the company was MKD 73 million in 2014 and almost doubled to MKD 133 million in 2015. Ademi won the Entrepreneur of the Year award in 2015 and Screen Media was the national winner of Macedonia in the European Business Awards in 2016.

== Services ==
Screen Media provides outdoor advertising solutions including billboards, mega lights, city lights, murals, sponsorships, and social activities. While the company also works with public institutions, it only contributes to about 3% of its revenue.

=== Social activities ===
From 2009 to 2013, Screen Media was the primary sponsor of Days of Albanian Alphabet, Theater in Tetovo to promote their activities. Since 2010, Screen Media has sponsored a small Children's football club and has participated with USAID Child Diseases. The company also helped the victims of the 2015 Tetovo floods.

== Controversies ==
The owner of Screen Media, Elmedin Ademi is the nephew of Abdilaqim Ademi, the Minister of Education and Science of Macedonia. Abdilaqim was also the general secretary of the second largest coalition participant in the government led by VMRO-DPMNE – DUI.
