= Sasho Penov =

Bulgarian politician (born 1970)

- Сашо Пенов
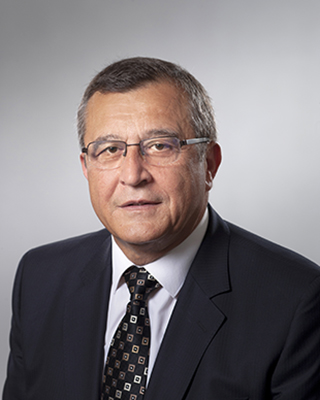
- Official portrait, 2022

Minister of Education and Science
- In office 2 August 2022 – 6 June 2023
- Prime Minister: Galab Donev
- Preceded by: Nikolai Denkov
- Succeeded by: Galin Tsokov

Personal details
- Born: 27 July 1960 (age 66) Mihaylovgrad, PR Bulgaria
- Party: Independent
- Education: Sofia University (LLB, LLM, LLD)
- Occupation: attorney; lecturer; politician

Sasho Georgiev Penov is a Bulgarian attorney, university lecturer and politician who served as a caretaker Minister of Education and Science in two consecutive terms between 2022 and 2023. A political Independent, he was previously the Dean of the Faculty of Law at Sofia University between 2011 and 2019.
