= Krum Zarkov =

Bulgarian politician (born 1982)

- Крум Зарков
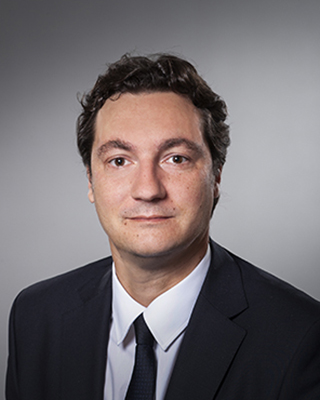
- Official portrait, 2022

Leader of the Bulgarian Socialist Party
- Incumbent
- Assumed office 8 February 2026
- Preceded by: Atanas Zafirov

Minister of Justice
- In office 2 August 2022 – 6 June 2023
- Prime Minister: Galab Donev
- Preceded by: Nadezhda Yordanova
- Succeeded by: Atanas Slavov

Member of the National Assembly
- In office 19 April 2017 – 1 August 2022
- Constituency: 19th MMC – Ruse

Personal details
- Born: Krum Kostadinov Zarkov; 21 November 1982 (age 43) Sofia, PR Bulgaria
- Party: BSP
- Children: 2
- Education: Lycée Français de Sofia
- Alma mater: Paris 1 Panthéon-Sorbonne University
- Occupation: Politician; lawyer

Krum Kostadinov Zarkov (Bulgarian: Крум Костадинов Зарков) is a Bulgarian politician serving as leader of the Bulgarian Socialist Party. He previously served as Member of the National Assembly from 2017 to 2022 and as Minister of Justice from 2022 to 2023.

== Biography ==
Krum Zarkov was born on 21 November 1982 in Sofia, People's Republic of Bulgaria. He graduated from the Lycée Français de Sofia and from the Paris 1 Panthéon-Sorbonne University with a degree in International Law and Law of International Organizations. At the snap parliamentary elections in 2017, he was elected from the list of the BSP for Bulgaria centre-left electoral alliance as a Member of National Assembly from 19th MMC – Ruse.

At the parliamentary elections in April 2021 he was re-elected from the list of the BSP for Bulgaria alliance as a Member of Parliament in the 45th National Assembly from 19th MMC – Ruse. At the snap parliamentary elections in July 2021 he was re-elected as a Member of Parliament on the list of the BSP for Bulgaria for the 46th National Assembly from 19th MMC – Ruse. At the snap parliamentary elections in November 2021, he was re-elected as MP on the list of the BSP for Bulgaria alliance in the 47th National Assembly from 19th MMC – Ruse. On 1 August 2022, it was announced that President Rumen Radev had signed decrees to dissolve the 47th National Assembly on 2 August 2022 and to appoint a caretaker government from 2 August. Krum Zarkov was appointed caretaker Minister of Justice.
