= Second Borisov Government =

Government of Bulgaria (2014–2017)

- 94th Cabinet of Bulgaria

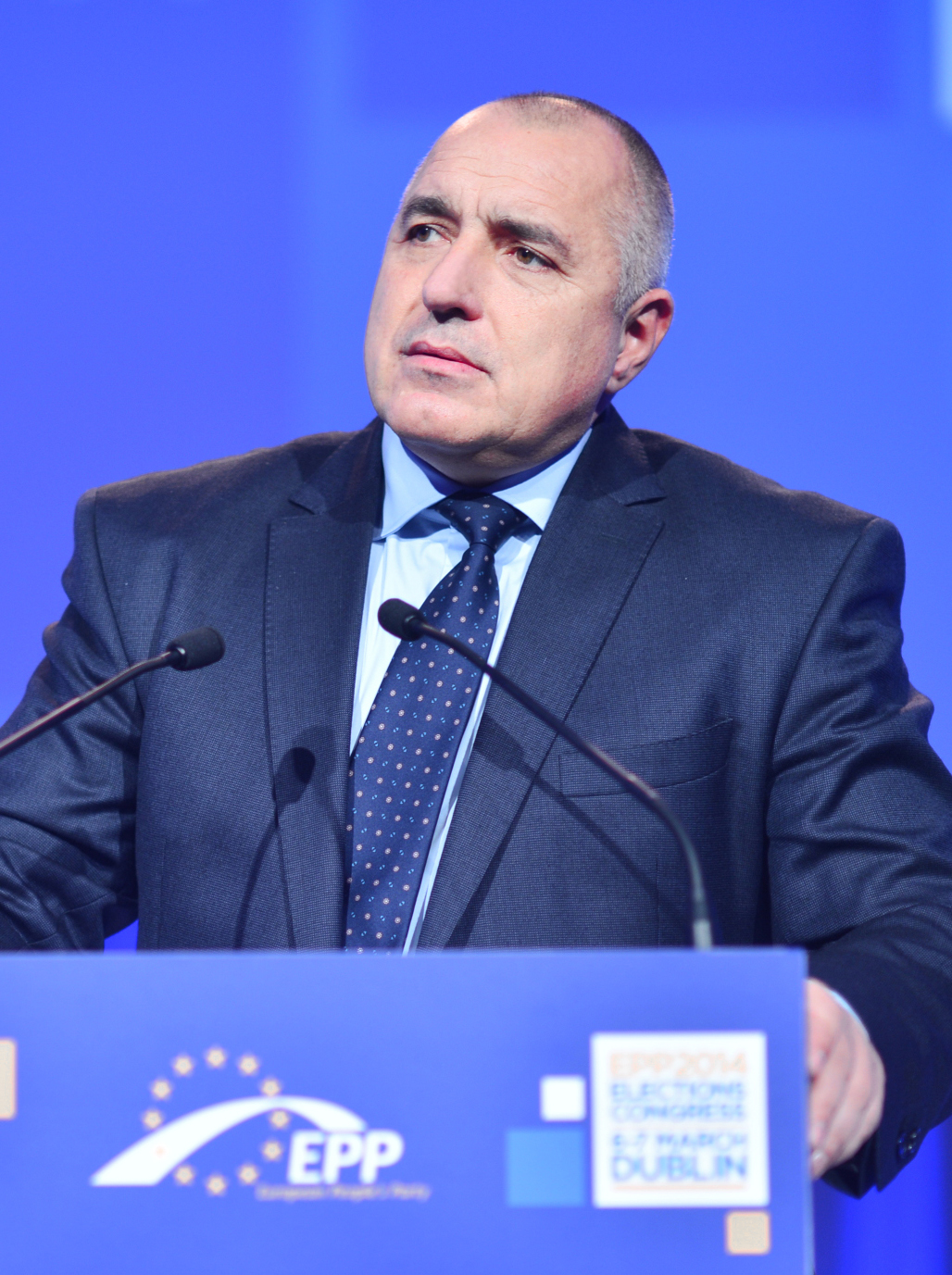
- Date formed: 7 November 2014
- Date dissolved: 27 January 2017

People and organisations
- Head of state: Rosen Plevneliev
- Head of government: Boyko Borisov
- Deputy head of government: See list: Rumyana Bachvarova (Coalition Policy and State Administration) Tomislav Donchev (EU Funds and Economic Policy) Meglena Kuneva (European Policy and Institutional Issues) Zornitsa Rusinova (Demographic and Social Policy)
- Member parties: GERB, Reformist Bloc (in coalition with GERB) and ABV (partnership agreement with GERB) until May 2016
- Status in legislature: Minority Coalition Government

History
- Incoming formation: Government formation
- Election: 2014
- Legislature term: 43rd National Assembly
- Predecessor: Bliznashki Government
- Successor: Gerdzhikov Government

The ninety-fourth Cabinet of Bulgaria took office on November 7, 2014. It was a coalition government chaired by Boyko Borisov. The government was formed after Borisov's party, GERB, won the 2014 parliamentary election. As GERB won 84 out of the 240 seats in the National Assembly (a plurality), they were compelled to form a coalition to legally govern.

== Formation ==
After being tasked by President Rosen Plevneliev to form a government, Borisov's GERB allied with the Reformist Bloc to form a government and got support from the Alternative for Bulgarian Revival (partnership agreement with GERB) and also had the outside support of the Patriotic Front. The cabinet of twenty ministers was approved by a majority of 136–97 (with one abstention). Borisov was then chosen as prime minister by an even larger vote of 149–85. Borisov became the first person to be elected twice as prime minister in the recent history of Bulgaria. Ministers with Reformist Bloc support are members of Democrats for a Strong Bulgaria, Union of Democratic Forces, Bulgaria for Citizens Movement and Bulgarian Agrarian National Union.

== Cabinet ==
Ministry	Minister	Party
Prime Minister	Boyko Borisov	GERB
Deputy Prime Minister in charge of coalition policy and state administration and Minister of Interior	Rumyana Bachvarova	GERB
Deputy Prime Minister in charge of absorption of EU funds and economic policy	Tomislav Donchev	GERB
Deputy Prime Minister in charge of EU policies and institutional matters	Meglena Kuneva	RB
Deputy Prime Minister and Minister of Labor and Social Policy	Ivaylo Kalfin	ABV
Minister of Justice	Ekaterina Zakharieva	RB
Minister of Foreign Affairs	Daniel Mitov	RB
Minister of Finance	Vladislav Goranov	GERB
Minister of Economy	Bozhidar Lukarski	RB
Minister of Energy	Temenuzhka Petkova	GERB
Minister of Tourism	Nikolina Angelkova	GERB
Minister of Education and Science	Todor Tanev	RB
Minister of Defence	Nikolay Nenchev	RB
Minister of Agriculture and Food	Desislava Taneva	GERB
Minister of Transport, Information Technology and Communications	Ivaylo Moskovski	GERB
Minister of Environment and Water	Ivelina Vasileva	GERB
Minister of Health	Petar Moskov	RB
Minister of Culture	Vezhdi Rashidov	GERB
Minister of Youth and Sports	Krasen Kralev	GERB

== Vuchkov resignation ==
On 4 March 2015, the Minister of Interior Veselin Vuchkov resigned. Vuchkov cited the reluctance of PM Borisov to replace the ministry's chief secretary Svetlozar Lazarov and the head of the National Security Agency (DANS) Vladimir Pisanchev. On 11 March, Vuchkov was replaced by Rumyana Bachvarova, who also kept her position as a Deputy PM.

== Ivanov resignation and protests ==
On 9 December 2015, the Minister of Justice Hristo Ivanov resigned, stating that the National Assembly had compromised the reforms in the court system by voting an altered version of the proposed amendments in the constitution. Ivanov added that the prime minister Borisov is dependent on the chief prosecutor Sotir Tsatsarov.

The unfulfilled judiciary reform and the resignation of the Minister of Justice sparked protests in Sofia.

On 18 December 2015, Ivanov was replaced by Ekaterina Zakharieva, who had been nominated by the prime minister Borisov.

== Tanev resignation ==
On 28 January 2016, the prime minister Borisov demanded that the Minister of Education and Science Todor Tanev resign. On 3 February, by a vote of 104-66 Meglena Kuneva was appointed as new minister. She also kept her position as a Deputy PM.

== ABV withdrawal ==
On 10 May 2016, Ivaylo Kalfin resigned as a Deputy Prime Minister and Minister of Labor and Social Policy. Alternative for Bulgarian Revival also withdrew from the coalition government.

== Resignation ==
On 13 November 2016, after the GERB candidate Tsetska Tsacheva lost the 2016 presidential elections to Rumen Radev, the prime minister Borisov announced that the government will resign. The resignation was approved by the National Assembly on 16 November 2016 by a majority of 218-0 (with 2 abstentions).

== See also ==
- First Borisov Government
- Third Borisov Government
- History of Bulgaria since 1989
