= Veselin Vuchkov =

Bulgarian politician and jurist

Personal details
- Born: 26 December 1968 (age 57) Stob, near Rila, Kyustendil Province, Bulgaria
- Profession: Politician, Jurist

Veselin Borislavov Vuchkov (Bulgarian: Веселин Бориславов Вучков), born 26 December 1968, is a Bulgarian politician and jurist, who served as the Minister of Interior of Bulgaria as part of the Second Borisov Government until 11 March 2015.

== Biography ==
Vuchkov graduated from the juridical faculty of Sofia University in 1994 and also earned a Doctor of Law degree in 2003.

He has been employed in the Ministry of Interior Academy and as a lecturer at various universities throughout Bulgaria.

On 31 July 2009, he was appointed as deputy Minister of Interior in the First Borisov Cabinet, stepping down on 13 March 2013. In the 2013-14 period, he sat as a deputy in the National Parliament.

On 7 November 2014, Vuchkov assumed his duties as Minister of Interior of Bulgaria, succeeding Yordan Bakalov.
