= Todor Tanev =

Todor Aleksandrov Tanev
- Тодор Танев

Personal details
- Born: 30 October 1957 (age 68) Sofia, Bulgaria
- Profession: Politician, Sociologist, Political Scientist

Todor Aleksandrov Tanev (Bulgarian: Тодор Александров Танев; born 30 October 1957), is a Bulgarian political scientist and sociologist, who served as the Minister of Education and Science as part of the Second Borisov Government until his resignation in February 2016.

== Biography ==
Born in Sofia, Tanev graduated from the English language high school in the city in 1976 and subsequently earned a BA in sociology from Sofia University in 1982. He is the holder of two doctoral degrees, both in the field of political science - the first one since 1991 and the second one since 2002. Tanev has made specializations in the United States and the Netherlands as well as lectured in these countries.

Tanev is a member of the citizens' council (Bulgarian: Граждански съвет) of the Reformist Bloc.

On 7 November 2014, he assumed his duties as Minister of Education and Science, succeeding Rumyana Kolarova.
