= Abdilaqim Ademi =

Macedonian politician

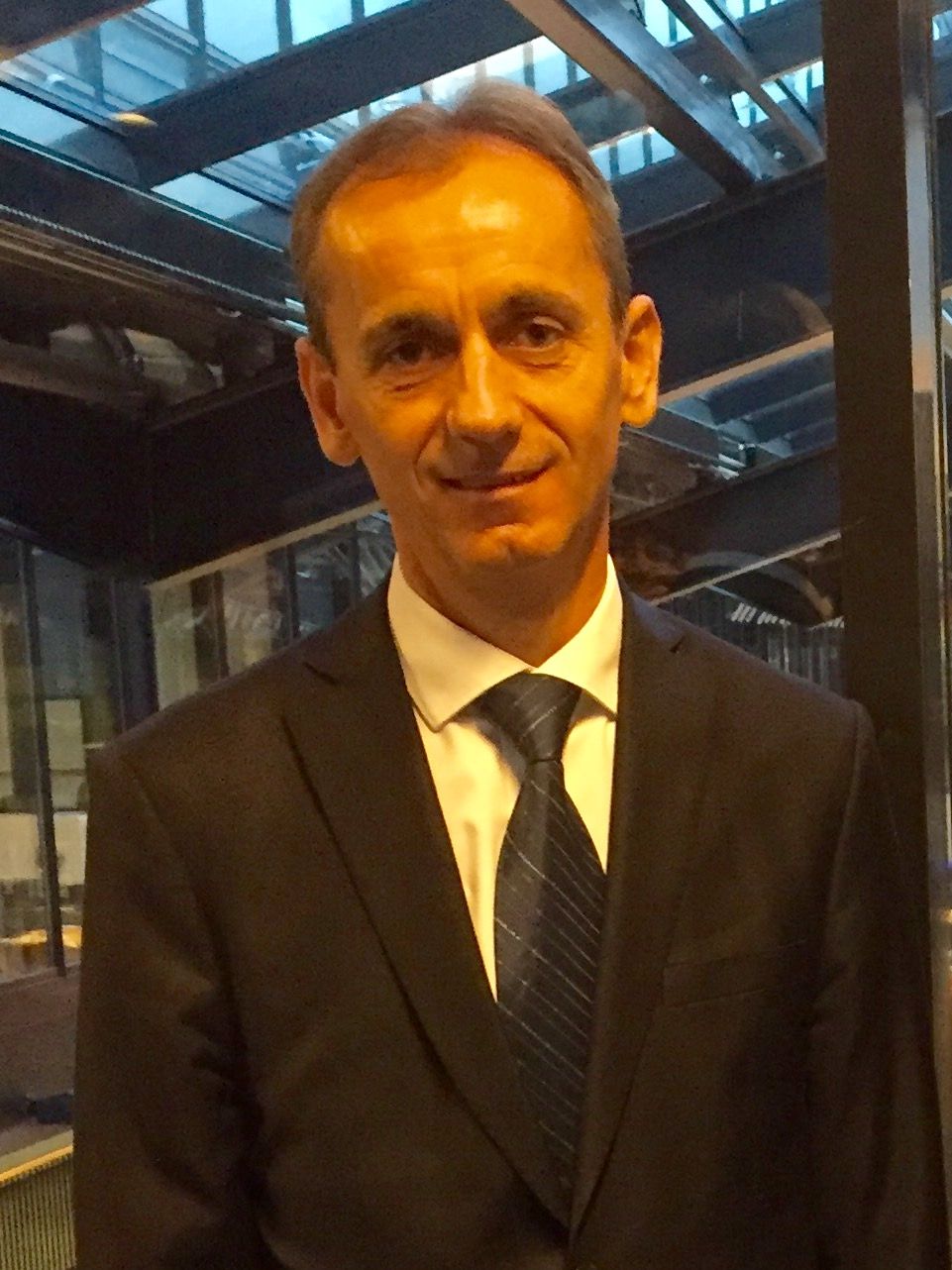
- Abdilaqim Ademi in 2016
- Born: 20 December 1969; Tetovo, SFR Yugoslavia
- Died: 15 February 2018 (aged 48); Tetovo, Macedonia
- Known for: Deputy Prime Minister of the Republic of Macedonia; Implementation of the Ohrid Framework Agreement; Member of the Parliament of Republic of Macedonia; Minister of Education and Science of Macedonia
- Children: 1

Abdilaqim Ademi (December 20, 1969 – February 15, 2018) was Minister of Education and Science of Republic of Macedonia.
