= Ministry of Education and Science (Bulgaria) =

Government ministry of Bulgaria

- Министерство на образованието и науката

Agency overview
- Formed: 1879
- Jurisdiction: Government of Bulgaria
- Agency executive: Krasimir Valchev (2017), Minister of Education and Science
- Website: http://www.mon.bg

The Ministry of Education and Science (Bulgarian: Министерство на образованието и науката, Ministerstvo na obrazovanieto i naukata) of Bulgaria is the ministry charged with regulating and promoting the educational and scientific work in the country. It was founded as the Ministry of Popular Enlightenment in 1879 and existed under this name until 1947, after which it changed its name numerous times. In 2009 the name changed from "Ministry of Education and Science" to "Ministry of Education, Youth and Science". In 2013, this change was reversed.

== Az-Buki ==
Az-Buki
- Founded: 1991
- Founder: Ministry of Education and Science (Bulgaria)
- Country of origin: Bulgaria
- Headquarters location: Sofia
- Publication types: academic journals, newspaper
- Nonfiction topics: science and education
- Official website: www.azbuki.bg

The national publishing house "Az-buki" under the Bulgarian Ministry of Education and Science currently publishes the weekly newspaper "Az-buki" ("Аз-буки" in Bulgarian) and 9 scientific journals. Its publications are intended for students, tutors, Bulgarian cultural centers and communities in and outside Bulgaria.

Nadia Kantareva-Baruh is the director of the publishing house.

=== Newspaper ===
The first edition of the national newspaper "Az-buki" came out on April 10, 1991. The weekly publication continues the tradition of a newspaper, which started to come out in 1896. "Az-buki" is distributed by means of subscription and each individual copy is read by an average of 22,8 people.

=== Publications ===
The list below includes nine scientific journals, which are indexed, referred, listed and abstracted in international databases, such as Web of Science, Philosopher's Index, Scopus, ERIH PLUS, Google Scholar and Russian Science Citation Index.

- Bulgarian Language and Literature (Bulgarski Ezik i Literatura) listed through EBSCOhost Research Databases. Bulgarian Language and Literature Journal has been included in Web of Science (Q4 of JCI), the European Reference Index for the Humanities and the Social Sciences (ERIH PLUS) and RSCI.
- History (Istoriya), indexed, referred, listed and abstracted in Web of Science (Q4 of JCI), ERIH PLUS, RSCI, CEEOL.
- Pedagogy (Pedagogika) – in Web of Science (Q4 of JCI); RSCI; CEEOL; ERIH PLUS
- Mathematics and Informatics – in Web of Science (Q4 of JCI), ERIH PLUS, RSCI, CEEOL.
- Natural Science and Advanced Technology Education – in Web of Science (Q4 of JCI), ERIH PLUS, RSCI, CEEOL, SCOPUS.
- Vocational Education – ERIH PLUS, RSCI, CEEOL, EBSCOHost, Google Scholar.
- Philosophy, (Filosofiya) – in Web of Science (Q4 of JCI), Philosopher's Index, ERIH PLUS, RSCI, CEEOL.
- Foreign Language Teaching, (Chuzhdoezikovo Obuchenie) – in Web of Science (Q3 of JCI), ERIH PLUS, RSCI, CEEOL.
- Strategies for Policy in Science and Education (Strategii na Obrazovatelnata i Nauchnata Politika) – in Web of Science (Q4 of JCI), Philosopher's Index, ERIH PLUS, RSCI, CEEOL.
