= Seizure of Bulgaria's Corpbank =

2014 bank failure

In June 2014, a bank run on Bulgaria's Corporate Commercial Bank (Corpbank) brought down the bank, the country's fourth largest. It was closed down by the country's central banking system, the Bulgarian National Bank, and had ripple effects throughout Bulgaria's economy. Corpbank's depositors have estimated that the losses from the bank's insolvency could amount to 10 billion Bulgarian lev or approximately 5 billion Euro. As a result, international investors became wary of making investments in the country. Corpbank's owner, Tzvetan Vassilev, lives in exile in Serbia as the Serbian courts have denied his extradition. Bulgaria's authorities charged him with embezzlement, but he said the charges are politically motivated.

== People ==
=== Tzvetan Vassilev ===
In 2013 Forbes named Tzvetan Vassilev the "most influential Bulgarian." Vassilev owned 100% of the shares of a finance house called Bromak EOOD. Until the government takeover of Corpbank, he was the majority shareholder of Corpbank. The bank controlled other companies which employed over 16,000 people.

=== Delyan Peevski ===
Until 2014, Vassilev and Delyan Peevski, the owner of a large network of media entities, were friends. Corpbank financed some of his business activities. Peevski's business expansion, which was funded by Corpbank, made it so that he controlled around 85% of Bulgarian media.

At some point, the two men had falling out. Vassilev told Peevski that he would discontinue funding Peevski's business expansion. The relationship became so sour that at one point, each man claimed that the other was trying to murder him.

Peevski retaliated by using his media outlets to spread rumors that Corpbank was financially unstable. Corpbank's depositors argue that these reports as well as the collaboration between Peevski and the prosecution have triggered the run on Corpbank (see section: Bank run) that ultimately led to its downfall. We, the Citizens, an NGO which represents thousands of depositors at Corpbank, submitted an application against Peevski under the US Magnitsky Act while other depositors are litigated against him in New York under the Racketeer Influenced and Corrupt Organizations Act.

Moreover, after the bank run in the third week of June 2014, the administration of the bank asked for conservatorship from the Bulgarian National Bank. The Bulgarian National Bank withdrew the bank's license on 6 November 2014 based on an obscure report, which it refused to make public: Corpbank's depositors argue the report relied on unacceptable methodology which artificially devalued its assets. Meanwhile, Peevski and his fellow party members from DPS introduced а Bill to Parliament modifying the Law on Banking Insolvency retroactively: critics argue the amendments are meant to help Peevski deviate key assets of Corpbank, such as Dunarit and Petrol.

Peevski grew up with connections; his mother, according to The New York Times, used to head the national lottery empire and is the ultimate leader over Peevski's growing media empire. She has strong connections, both economic and political.

Peevski is both a politician and a businessman. He has long been associated with the political party "Movement for Rights and Freedoms" (DPS in Bulgarian). Among the locals, the party is known as the "Turkish party" because it promotes the rights of Bulgaria's Turkish minority.

According to Forbes, "Peevski ... is associated with shady dealings going back years: he was briefly investigated for corruption in 2007 but the case was dropped. Because of the scale of his business interests (including those in his mother's name), he effectively controls large parts of the Bulgarian economy."

In 2013, Bulgarian voters elected Peevski as a Member of Parliament. The Oresharski Government then appointed him as head of the State Security Agency, but removed him from the position after street protests and demands for the government's resignation. Nonetheless, accusations that the government was supporting Bulgarian oligarchs and mobsters continued.

Vassilev told a Forbes reporter in 2015 that "The political mafia is persistently trying to downgrade what happened to Corpbank to a personal conflict between Mr. Peevski and me, which is utterly untrue. I had a conflict with the political mafia ruling the country, which has been blackmailing and threatening me for many years."

== Extortion attempt ==
In April 2014, associates of the mafia-ruled DPS, one of the most powerful political parties in Bulgaria, asked Vassilev to give them bank assets for free.

"I was told that Corpbank would be taken down if I did not satisfy their ‘request'," Vassilev said. "I refused…..but I now know that Corpbank's destruction was planned months before the bank run. The goal was to acquire Corpbank's most attractive assets at a low price and to eliminate me as an influencer in the socio-economic life of the country."

== Bank run ==
The bank run started when the prosecution entered the offices of the bank as a result of a fake accusation accompanied by a black PR campaign in the media of Peevski.

Following the bank run, Corpbank was closed for nearly six months. During that time, depositors were unable to pull their money out. The Bulgarian Deposit Insurance Fund was not large enough to compensate insured depositors, so Bulgaria needed to raise additional funds. To complicate matters further, the country was without a government from July to October 2014. Therefore, paying the depositors was an impossible task. Reopening the bank was not an option either, since that would simply restart the run. Therefore, the BNB kept the bank "on ice". Subsequently, the Court of Justice of the European Union established that Bulgaria breached the Directive on deposit guarantee schemes.

Following the bank run in June 2014, Corpbank requested special supervision by the Bulgarian National Bank. The bank neither received a liquidity injection by the government unlike First Investment Bank which faced a run in the same period. The shareholders were not allowed to bail it out either. Its license was subsequently withdrawn by the Bulgarian National Bank in November 2014. However, neither the shareholders nor the depositors were allowed to appeal the decision. As a result, there was pending litigation before the European Court of Human Rights.

== Shutdown of Corpbank ==
In July 2014, the central bank said it was removing Corpbank's banking license and would move the bank's healthy divisions into a separate bank. These events marked the first banking collapse since Bulgaria's 1996-1997 domestic financial crisis.

According to Forbes, "The central bank denied Corpbank liquidity support, forcing it to close its doors. Corpbank's management asked the central bank to put Corpbank into "special supervision", a procedure under which the central bank temporarily takes over a troubled bank in order to put it back on track."

=== FIBank failure ===
Shortly after Corpbank's failure, another bank run happened to a bank called FIBank. The central bank's response to FIBank's bank run was much different than its response to Corpbank's. The central bank gave FIBank plenty of liquidity to protect FIBank's financial stability, even though it had already allowed the bank to fail. According to Vassilev, this double standard was due to "the will of the political mafia".

Vassilev said that the government brought down Corpbank to remove Vassilev, and that it protected FIBank to serve political ends.

=== No nationalization ===
The Bulgarian central bank (BNB) accused Corpbank of extensive fraud. Because of this apparent fraud, BNB said that nationalizing Corpbank was not an option. BNB described the extent of the bank's fraud as "a bottomless barrel".

The Deposit Insurance Fund of Bulgaria guaranteed all deposits up to 100,000 euros.

=== Blame ===
Media reports say that BNB was aware that it failed to adequately supervise the bank. But more specifically, BNB places blame on one of its officials, the Deputy Head of Banking Supervision. Everyone else on the BNB board was exonerated. "This does not bode well for the future of bank supervision in Bulgaria," Forbes wrote.

BNB also made a specific accusation of fraud against Vassilev in relation to the withdrawing of funds in advance of Corpbank's failure. According to BNB, "Specifically - according to conservators - on June 19 this year, the day before the Corporate Commercial Bank was to be placed in special measures, a third party downloaded and delivered against receipt to the majority owner of Corporate Commercial Bank 205,887,223 BGN equivalent in cash, mostly Euro." Subsequently, the Bulgarian court established that Vassilev's signature on the receipt was forged.

Political analyst Ilian Vassilev said that Corporate Commercial Bank was "the victim of an assault" by Bulgaria's Prosecutor's Office and media mogul and politician Delyan Peevski." Financier Vladimir Karolev said that the insolvency of Corporate Commercial Bank was artificial and deliberate.

== Attempted rescue plans ==
=== Breach of EU rules ===
Bulgaria was in "triple breach of EU law regarding treatment of its depositors":

1. Bulgaria wrongfully transposed the EU Directive on the Deposit Guarantee Schemes.
2. It did not perform its obligation, as required by the directive, to repay the eligible deposits within 20 days following the bank's failure.
3. The Deposit Insurance Fund, which is supposed to insure all guaranteed deposits in the Bulgarian banking system, was mismanaged. Furthermore, the fund only held 1 billion euros, an insufficient amount of money to repay the guaranteed deposits "even in one troubled bank."

In October 2014, following complaints from depositors, the European Commission and European Banking Authority demanded that Bulgaria compensate insured depositors. Bulgaria refused, claiming that under Bulgarian law the bank had to be "declared insolvent" before deposit insurance could be paid. Insolvency could only be declared after a full audit, which would take four months to do. In December 2014, the depositors eventually got their funds.

=== Attempted rescue by owners ===
The shareholders attempted to put a rescue plan together for the bank, but it wasn't accepted. According to Vassilev, the circumstances surrounding the revocation of the bank's license were suspicious. He and other shareholders, including the Omani Sovereign Wealth Fund (the second-largest shareholder) put forward a rescue plan for the bank. But the parliament dismissed their proposal "out of hand."

"Even though we made a solid proposal to the Bulgarian state, we were turned away in the most humiliating manner by the central bank and by the ruling government," Vassilev said. "We were simply told that our proposal was "unserious" without any clarification on the reasons why they deemed so and without a proper meeting to discuss it."

After Corpbank's license was revoked, the bank was forced into insolvency.

The Omani Sovereign Wealth Fund sued the Bulgarian government in the International Court for Settlement of Investment Disputes, based in Washington, D.C., for rejecting the rescue plan. Omani Sovereign Wealth Fund alleged that the rejection breached key principles regarding equal treatment and protection of investors.

== Embezzlement charges ==
As of October 2015, Vassilev was accused of embezzlement, although at that time no charges were officially filed. The BNB claimed that he ran a pyramid scheme.

The Bulgarian's office fabricated the accusation, Vassilev said, in order to arrest him and use it as an action to block his and his family's assets.

Initially, the central bank's governor accused Vassilev of taking 200 million leva in plastic bags from Corpbank's headquarters during the week of the bank run. Vassilev said he had been traveling abroad that week. He also said, "200 million takes a lot of space and cannot go unnoticed if you carry it on your back in the middle of Sofia." The Bulgarian Prosecutor General modified the charging documents, changing the timeframe of the alleged embezzlement from the week of the bank run to the span of several years.

Additionally, the accusation was based on the statements of only two witnesses. "It was already proven in court that one of the witnesses had forged my signature on documents she presented as proof of the alleged crime," Vassilev said. "And some of the senior staff of Corpbank were pressured to testify against me by the prosecution service through the use of threats."
