= Ivan Geshev =

Bulgarian jurist

- Иван Гешев

Chief Public Prosecutor of Bulgaria
- In office 18 December 2019 – 15 June 2023

Deputy Chief Public Prosecutor
- In office July 2018 – 18 December 2019

Chairman of the Specialized Prosecutor's Office
- In office July 2016 – July 2018

Personal details
- Born: 19 December 1970 (age 55) Mirkovo, Bulgaria
- Party: CIVIL BLOCK
- Domestic partner: Detelina Hancheva
- Children: 2
- Education: MVR Academy
- Profession: Jurist, prosecutor

Ivan Stoimenov Geshev (Bulgarian: Иван Стоименов Гешев; born 19 December 1970) is a Bulgarian jurist who served as Bulgaria's Chief Public Prosecutor from 26 November 2019 until his dismissal on 15 June 2023. Geshev previously served as Head of the Specialized Prosecutor's Office and as Deputy Chief Public Prosecutor.

Geshev was the only candidate proposed to succeed Sotir Tsatsarov as Chief Public Prosecutor of Bulgaria in 2019, which triggered controversy and public protests against his candidacy. He was appointed to the position by Bulgaria's Supreme Judicial Council in late 2019, but his election was initially vetoed by Bulgarian President Rumen Radev. The Supreme Judicial Council subsequently confirmed his appointment. He was inaugurated on 18 December 2019. In 2020, the raid against the Bulgarian Presidency by the Bulgarian prosecution sparked mass protests demanding both the resignation of Ivan Geshev as Chief Public Prosecutor and the government of Boyko Borissov.

After a failed assassination attempt on 1 May 2023, which triggered a political scandal and open confrontation between Geshev, his deputy Borislav Sarafov and political figures including Boyko Borisov, Geshev was voted out of office by the Supreme Judicial Council, effective 15 June 2023.

== Early life ==
Geshev graduated from the Academy of the Ministry of Interior, in Sofia. He worked as an investigator before becoming a regular prosecutor in 2006.

From September 1994 to February 1995, he was operative functionary at Fifth District Police Department - Metropolitan Interior Directorate – Ministry of Interior. In the period from February 1995 to April 2006, he successively held the position of Assistant investigator and Investigator at Sofia Metropolitan Investigation Service.

From 17 April 2006 to 11 May 2012 Geshev worked as a Prosecutor at Sofia Regional Prosecutor's Office having reached the higher rank of "Prosecutor at the Prosecutor's Office of Appeal" and was promoted to the rank of "Prosecutor at the Supreme Cassation Prosecutor's Office and Supreme Administrative Prosecutor's Office".

Between 11 May 2012, and 19 July 2016, he was Prosecutor at Sofia City Prosecutor's Office.

Geshev was given a certificate for restricting the distribution and use of drugs, prostitution, child pornography, corruption, terrorism and expressed support for causes to the benefit of society, for the formation of humane models of behavior in the younger generation. He received a certificate and plaque "Giovanni Falcone" from the competition "A cowards die many times, a brave man dies only once", issued by the Embassy of the Republic of Italy and the Municipality of Blagoevgrad. He also received a Europol Certificate for a successful operation conducted on 4 October 2016 in Plovdiv for dismantling an illegal printing house for the production of Euro banknotes.

From 19 July 2016 to 16 July 2018, Geshev was Head of the Specialized Prosecutor's Office.

From 16 July 2018 until 18 December 2019, Geshev served as Deputy Prosecutor General at the Supreme Cassation Prosecutor's Office.

== Nomination for General Prosecutor and Ensuing Protests of 2019 ==
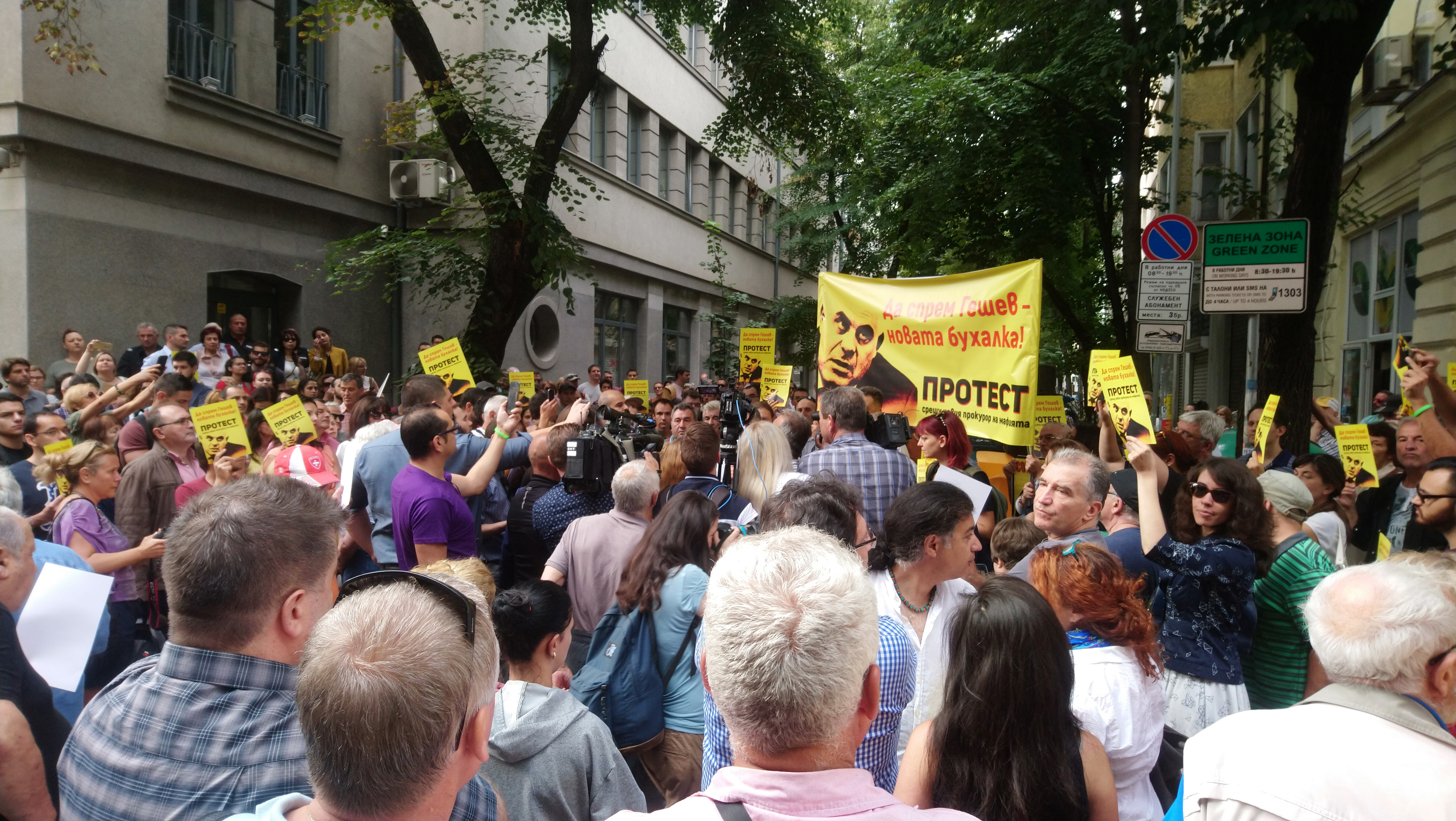
Protests against Ivan Geshev's nomination for General Prosecutor in 2019

In October 2019, the Supreme Judicial Council of Bulgaria elected Ivan Geshev as Prosecutor General of the Republic of Bulgaria. Geshev was supported by twenty members of the council while four voted against him.

Geshev was nominated for Prosecutor General by all eleven members of the Prosecutors' Chamber of the Supreme Judicial Council on 22 July, including by the then Prosecutor General Sotir Tsatsarov, whose term expired in January 2020. Danail Kirilov, the Minister of Justice, explained that he considered Geshev's nomination as one of the professional circles. In his words, even if there were another nominee, the maximum support they would receive would be 14 votes. "That would result in no election, no result of the election procedure. It would also mean the creation of a precondition for confrontation between the two chambers of the SJC, which I believe is absolutely undesirable and should not be allowed in any way and for any reason," the Minister said during the sitting.

Ivan Geshev's nomination for General Prosecutor and the subsequent refusal of Kirilov to nominate a second candidate, which guaranteed Geshev's appointment, sparked mass protests in Bulgaria in the summer of 2019. Those protesting demanded Geshev's withdrawal from the competition for General Prosecutor. "Geshev is a disgrace," "Resign" and "Mafia should go" were the slogans of the protests.

Political scientist Evgenii Dainov criticized the nomination: "Ivan Geshev clearly told us he will prosecute people from a list, without respecting the separation of powers. He will prosecute people who are inconvenient for him. He is extremely dangerous and he has revealed himself as the gravedigger of Bulgarian democracy". Judge Zdravka Kalaidjieva, former judge at the European Court of Human Rights, was also concerned: "In his interview with the Bulgarian National Television, Mr. Geshev presented his views on the prosecutor's office as a repressive body against pre-selected ideological and economic opponents – views which are contrary to the principle of equality before the law, pluralism of opinions and free competition. He believes the prosecution is a body whose main purpose is to arrest and conduct show operations and convict people instead of sending the suspects of a crime before a court which can hand down a verdict".

Some analysts believed Ivan Geshev could have been a rocket carrier for a less public but equally controversial candidate who may be nominated after protests escalate. Prime Minister Boyko Borisov has already expressed his support for Member of European Parliament Emil Radev.

Prominent civil society members and NGOs, including the Bulgarian Helsinki Committee, asserted that Geshev lacked the professional and moral qualities which are required for the position because of his record of abusing the law and human rights.

In response to the protests, colleagues of Ivan Geshev from the prosecution started a petition in his support. There were many declarations of Regional Prosecutor's Offices and jurists who expressed their support for Geshev's nomination.

== Chief Prosecutor of Bulgaria ==
In November 2019, Bulgaria's Supreme Judicial Council voted to appoint him to the office with 20 votes for and 4 against. Bulgarian President Rumen Radev, however, refused to sign the decree formally inaugurating Geshev, remarking that his candidacy had been backed only by government-controlled institutions and that no other alternative was provided. He called on the judicial council to revise their decision. The council, however, voted in favour of Geshev a second time with the same vote margin, which triggered a constitutional requirement for Radev to sign the decree. Stating that he would refuse to violate the constitution, Radev did so following a meeting with Geshev, but called for changes to Bulgaria's constitution.

Shortly before taking office, Geshev cancelled a meeting with Bulgarian opposition leader Korneliya Ninova, after the latter announced that she would provide additional information to Geshev regarding a water availability crisis affecting Pernik. He accused Ninova of using the institution for "political gains". Ninova reacted by stating that it was his decision on whether or not to meet with her, but that she would nonetheless send him questions in written format.

After his election on 14 November 2019, Geshev took office as Prosecutor General on 18 December 2019.

=== Protests of 2020 ===
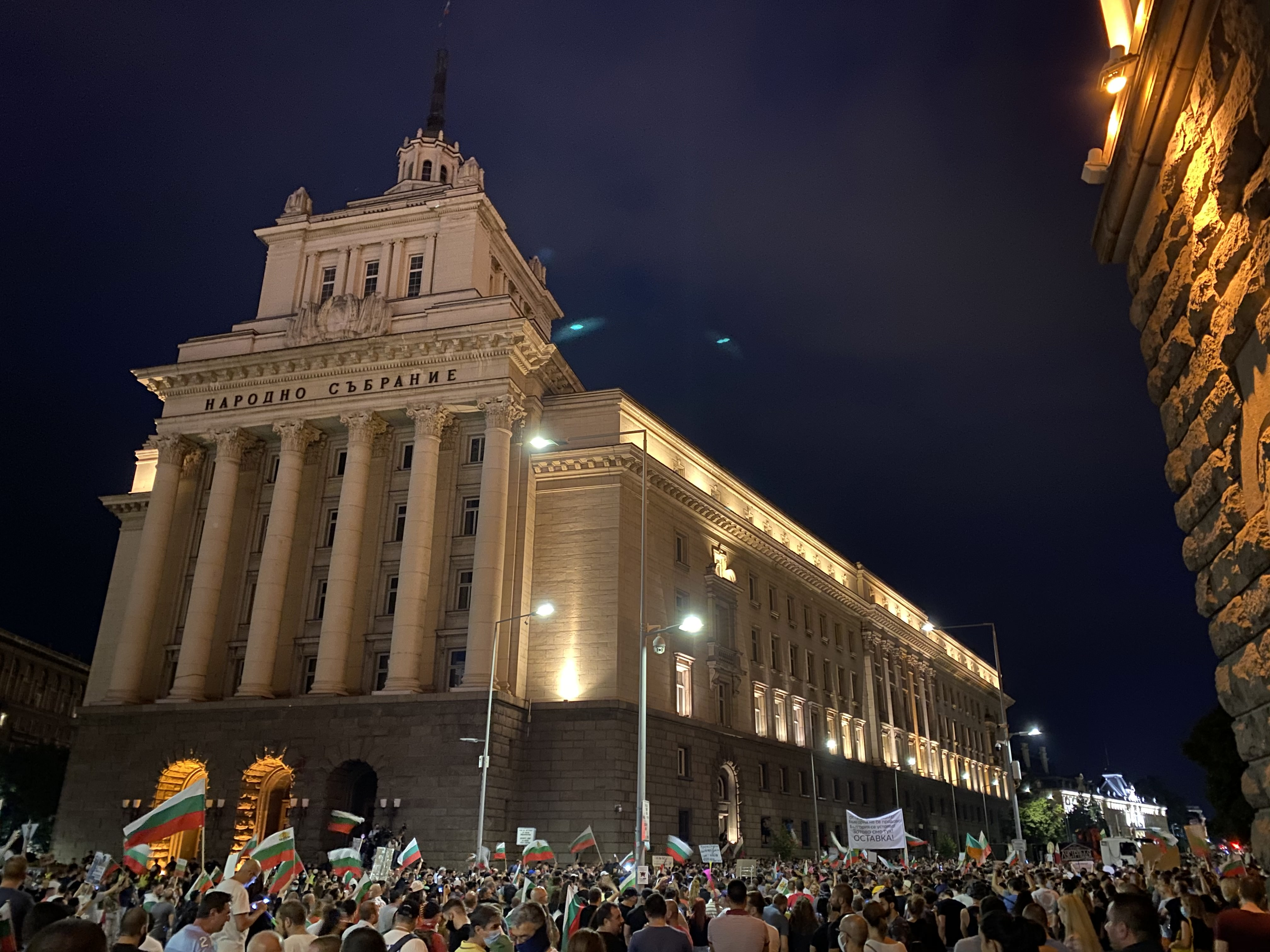
Protests against Ivan Geshev and Boyko Borissov in 2020

In 2020, the raid against the Bulgarian Presidency by the Bulgarian prosecution sparked mass protests demanding both the resignation of Ivan Geshev as Chief Public Prosecutor and the government of Boyko Borissov. In response to the protests, the European Parliament adopted a resolution on the rule of law deficiencies in Bulgaria, citing "a significant deterioration in respect for the principles of rule of law, democracy and fundamental rights, including the independence of the judiciary, separation of powers, the fight against corruption and freedom of the media" and expressing "solidarity with the people of Bulgaria in their legitimate demands and aspirations for justice, transparency, accountability and democracy".

=== 2023 assassination attempt ===
On 1 May 2023 a roadside bomb exploded next to Geshev's motorcade near the town of Samokov. There were no injuries as a result of the explosion. Deputy prosecutor general Borislav Sarafov reported that Geshev was traveling with his family when an “extremely strong” explosion occurred that generated a "towering" pillar of fire and left a 3-meter-wide crater. He further claimed the bomb had a TNT equivalent of 3 kg and was "clearly intended to kill". However, most of these claims were refuted by Interior Minister Ivan Demerdzhiev during a hearing in Parliament on 5 May. Demerdzhiev reported that Geshev's family was not with him during the accident and that the explosion caused insignificant damage to Geshev's car, namely a broken headlight, further stressing that the force of the explosion was insufficient to cause injuries inside the armoured vehicle. This led opposition parliamentarians like Assen Vassilev and Atanas Atanasov and former Bulgarian ambassador to Moscow Ilian Vassilev to allege that the assassination attempt had been staged.

=== Removal from office ===
On 8 May a sudden rift emerged between Geshev and his deputy Borislav Sarafov. Sarafov issued a statement, in which he accused Geshev of meddling in the investigation of the assassination attempt and pushing the prosecutor's office in the field of politics. Sarafov later claimed that Geshev used his influence to steer key investigations for the purpose of blackmailing political figures, further saying he felt his life was threatened and requested to be provided with personal bodyguards. On 11 May GERB nominee for prime minister Mariya Gabriel announced that the first task of the minister of justice in a cabinet headed by her would be to file a request for Geshev's dismissal with the Supreme Judicial Council (SJC) for "causing reputational damage to the judiciary in light of the recent events". DPS leader Mustafa Karadayi called Gabriel's intention "good idea" and "necessary to overcome the built up tension in society". The next day, 6 members of the SJC jointly filed a request for Geshev's dismissal.

At a press conference on 15 May Geshev told the media that he received a letter threatening him with leaking of sensitive videos if had not resigned by 10 AM that day. He claimed that one month prior he was offered the position of ambassador to Turkey or Israel in return for his resignation, which he was told came from Boyko Borisov. Geshev ceremonially tore his resignation, saying that he will finish his term despite the recent events, and that "the people shall sweep the political trash from the Parliament". In retaliation, Geshev renewed the stalled "Barcelonagate" investigation, and on 2 June filed a request in Parliament for the revokement of Borisov's parliamentary immunity, citing that sufficient evidence had been gathered to indict Borisov on a case of money laundering in Barcelona.

On 12 June the Supreme Judicial Council voted 16 to 4 in favour of Geshev's dismissal. Thus, Geshev became the first prosecutor general to be removed from office in the history of the Republic of Bulgaria. On 15 June President Radev signed the decree officially dismissing Geshev. Borislav Sarafov was elected acting prosecutor general by the prosecutors’ college of the SJC. The PP-DB coalition called for Sarafov's resignation, stating that "Bulgaria needs a real judicial reform, and the replacement of Geshev with Sarafov is a farce, not a reform".

== Investigations by Ivan Geshev and investigations of the Prosecutor's Office under Ivan Geshev ==
=== Corporate Commercial Bank case ===
Ivan Geshev is most known for his role in the Corporate Commercial Bank case – he describes himself as "the face of the team which worked on it". After a rift between the bank's majority shareholder Tsvetan Vasilev and Delyan Peevski in 2014, the prosecution raided Vassilev's offices and triggered a run on the bank. Vassilev said the bank was attacked because he refused to transfer assets to Peevski "for free". The Bulgarian National Bank did not provide a liquidity injection to the bank, put it under conservatorship and revoked its license. Depositors and shareholders were not allowed to appeal the decision. In 2022, the European Court of Human Rights established the bank's license was revoked in violation of the right to a fair trial and the right to property. Some shareholders litigated before the International Centre for Settlement of Investment Disputes. Clients of the bank have also submitted a claim against Delyan Peevski and Bulgarian institutions in New York under the Racketeer Influenced and Corrupt Organizations Act. In 2021, Delyan Peevski was sanctioned for corruption by the US government under the Global Magnitsky Act.

In 2017, Geshev indicted Vassilev and 17 other people for leading an organized criminal group, which allegedly drained the bank. Geshev compared writing the indictment to "landing on the Moon with a diesel engine". When commentators wondered why Peevski was not questioned during the investigation, Geshev said that Putin and Obama were not questioned either. Critics have observed that the main witness against Vassilev, Biser Lazov, became a millionaire after the bank's closure by appropriating assets of the bank. Many believe the bank was purposefully bankrupted, so that its assets could be appropriated by political circles.

In December 2018, the Specialized Prosecutor's Office raided the offices of Vassilev's lawyers and confiscated documents. Journalists commented that "the message was clear" – "if lawyers do not want to end in trouble, they should choose their clients carefully and avoid those who the prosecution wants to convict not based on proof, but on bla-bla from 1001 Nights". In 2019, the prosecution arrested witnesses in the Corporate Commercial Bank case and raised charges against them. Free Europe reported that the charges have been raised based on unclear documents – it was also "unprecedented" that the gendarmerie was mobilized and surrounded the court building when the people's measures were examined by the court.

=== Mladost case ===
A second case for which Ivan Geshev is known is the arrest and subsequent trial of Desislava Ivancheva and Bilyana Petrova, mayor and deputy mayor of the Mladost municipality of Sofia. The two were held in handcuffs for hours while media were invited to film. The women were held in custody during the trial in conditions which Bulgaria's ombudsman Maya Manolova described as unacceptable. In the summer of 2018, Ivancheva was escorted to hospital with handcuffs, leg cuffs and a protective belt, which human rights experts deemed to be an example of torture.

Bilyana Petrova's lawyer Irène Savova was subjected to prosecutorial pressure as the prosecution opened 11 proceedings against her. Her apartment building was plastered with her obituaries – an incident the prosecution refused to investigate even though it looked like a death threat.

Ivancheva and Petrova were accused of asking for a bribe to provide a construction permit quickly, but the main witness against them retracted his testimony, arguing he was pressured to provide false statements by the prosecutors. Ivan Geshev said that "all gypsies do this" and this was "expected". Media reported that the other witness against Ivancheva and Petrova had common business interests with Ivan Geshev's spouse.

The Bulgarian Helsinki Committee argued the arrest of Ivancheva and Petrova in 2018 was a "drastic violation of human rights". They also claim: "Geshev's behavior either shows his lack of knowledge of human rights or the purposeful violation of human rights. Both hypotheses are inadmissible and their consequences will be examined by the European Court of Human Rights".

The arrests and abuses in custody of Ivancheva and Petrova were included in the 2018 Human Rights Report by the United States Department of State as examples of human rights violations.

=== First case of preventing terrorism ===
In June 2019, Bulgaria's Prosecutor's Office arrested a 16-year-old boy with the claim that they "prevented a terrorist attack". Ivan Geshev said this was a "classic case of recruitment by ISIS which lasted for up to a year" and this was "the first case of prevention of a terror attack" in Bulgaria. Geshev stated parents had to be vigilant because children get radicalized through the Internet. Shortly after, it turned out the parents of the boy contacted the authorities themselves because they were worried about the child's mental health. Even though the prosecution demanded the child's permanent arrest, the court released him under the condition of being monitored by a child psychologist. Commentators believed that this operation was a publicity stunt aimed at improving the image of the prosecution.

=== Hacking of the National Revenue Agency ===
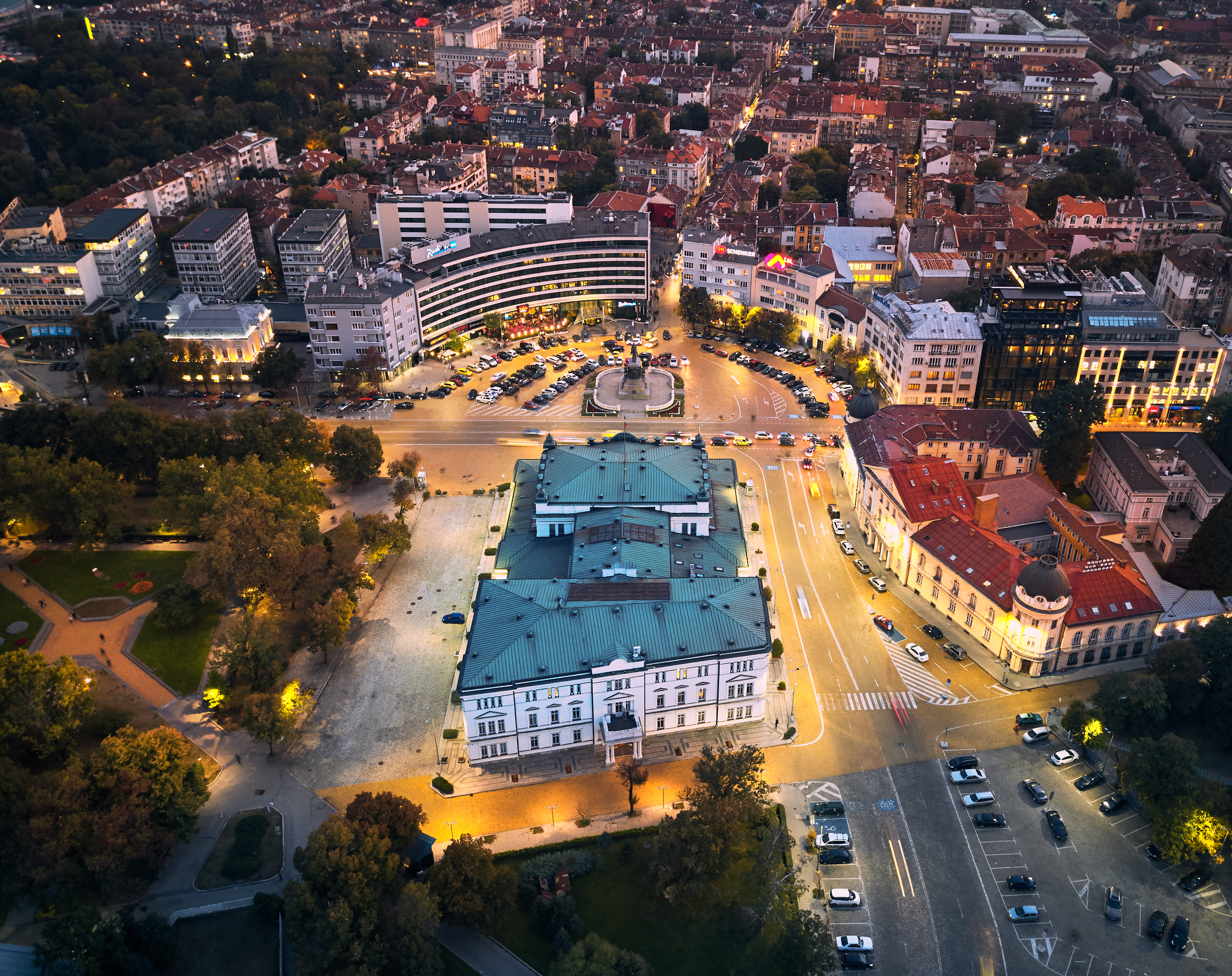
The National Assembly of the Republic of Bulgaria and its gardens: the prosecution argues the hackers conspired to hack the gardens' sprinklers, spray cars and cause political instability

In July 2019, the personal data of millions of Bulgarians was distributed to the media – it appeared the database of the country's National Revenue Agency was hacked. "So, at least for a year, the Bulgarian society, politicians, those who are in charge of the country, they knew quite well about the serious cybersecurity problems in the government infrastructures and they didn't do anything about it", a victim was quoted saying.

The prosecution initially detained a 20-year-old information security worker. However, Ivan Geshev announced that the main lead on which they work is "cyber racketeering" and "a conspiracy against the state". Geshev also said the prosecution found "horrifying things" on the security worker's computer: he was searching for information about Delyan Peevski, Boyko Borisov and Sotir Tsatsarov.

Subsequently, the prosecution modified the charges – the head of the company in which the information security expert worked, the commercial director and the expert himself were accused of terrorism. Prosecutor Evgeniya Stankova told the media that the three carried out "activity against the political system". She said the three conspired to hack the sprinkler system of the gardens of the Bulgarian Parliament, to spray the cars of guests, and to induce panic among the general population in order to destabilize the whole political system. Free Europe, however, inquired before the Bulgarian National Assembly and found there was no electronic irrigation system: the gardens were watered with water carriers. The water terrorism theory by the prosecution inspired jokes and memes which were covered on national television.

=== Sarafovo case ===
Life sentences without parole were imposed by the Specialized Criminal Court on Meliad Farah and Hassan al-Haj, accused by the Specialized Prosecutor's Office as perpetrators of the attack on Sarafovo Airport in 2012.The court also upheld the civil claims for non-pecuniary damages caused to the dead five Israeli citizens and one Bulgarian citizen, as well as for the many victims during the attack amounting to a total of over BGN 100 million. Meliad Farah and Hassan al-Haj were sentenced also to the maximum conviction of 10 years in prison each for using false official documents - false driving licenses of the State of Michigan and a social security card in order to conceal their identity on Bulgarian territory. The court held that the collected written, oral and physical evidence clearly indicated that Meliad Farah and Hassan al-Haj were the perpetrators of the organized terrorist attack against Israeli tourists on Bulgarian territory. The two defendants owning Australian and Canadian passports, were found to be of Lebanese descent and had links to the radical wing of the Shiite group "Hezbollah". The decision of the Specialized Criminal Court is not final and can be appealed to the Specialized Criminal Court of Appeal.

=== Prosecution of a sitting minister ===
In 2019 the prosecution indicted a sitting minister for mismanagement, resulting in a water crisis in Pernik, a city near the capital. In its resolution on the rule of law deficiencies in Bulgaria of 2020, the European Parliament showed concern about these charges.

=== Vassil Bozhkov and other cases ===
In 2020, the prosecution started investigations into the gambling sector of Bulgaria.

Following an investigation of the Prosecutor's Office of the Republic of Bulgaria for espionage, Russian citizens were forcibly removed because of accusation of their links with the intelligence services of the Russian Federation. Checks and investigations have been commissioned for identifying misuse of European Funds – Rural Development Program – Family Hotels; in addition, some of those involved were indicted for.

=== Revision of the Privatization cases ===
An in-depth review of the 30-years period of privatization of state-owned properties was commissioned based on information on possible harming of the public interest of billions of Euros.

=== Organized crime cases ===
The prosecution has undertaken actions aiming to cease the unregulated incineration of hazardous waste at the Bulgarian Thermal Power Station. Part of the amount of waste was imported from European countries, therefore at the end of the investigation by the Prosecutor's Office of the Republic of Bulgaria this waste was exported back to the country of origin. A few days ago, the largest pollutant incinerating of hazardous waste, which many media have reported over the years for, have ceased operations after an order of the Prosecutor's Office of the Republic Bulgaria.

== Controversies ==
The tenure of Geshev has been accompanied by a lack of litigation against the most prominent elite of the Bulgarian political class, with allegations of complicity in the state capture of Bulgaria, as well as an obduracity in hindering judicial reforms to tackle the rampant corruption in Bulgaria, levied against him by opposing political parties such as We Continue the Change. The Petkov government made efforts to legislate a regulatory authority capable of auditing the Chief Prosecutor's work, which culminated in a decision by the Bulgarian Constitutional Court to permit the Minister of Justice to request the Prosecutor's resignation, although this has not since been acted upon. Geshev has been viewed as a key figure in the perpetuation of the model of corruption on Bulgaria by his opponents, allegedly serving to overlook offences perpetrated by executive figures in government, among whom most prominently was Boyko Borisov. With regards to Borisov, Geshev has not always taken action against allegations raised against him, such as the "Barcelonagate" scandal, whereby Borisov was accused of laundering "millions of euros" through a purported scheme in Barcelona, which was intermittently pending investigation by the Spanish authorities. Another case saw land baron Svetoslav Ilchovski accuse Borisov in a parliamentary committee of possessing large wads of cash, gold ingots, and a pistol by his bedside drawers (depicted in a photograph), extortion, and racketeering, alleging he was made to pay sums of "700-800 thousand levs a year" (~€350,000-400,000) in exchange for his continued survival, on pain of "burn[ing]". Whilst Borisov initially did not deny the authenticity of the photos, the prosecution took no action to investigate, even after he later did rebuke the exposé as either doctored or framed.

This scandal was also the most significant contributor in the sparking of the 2020–2021 Bulgarian protests, where the endemically accumulating corruption since the beginning of the first Borisov cabinet in 2009 served as the instigating factor for a series of widespread and multinational protests against Borisov and Geshev. Over the period 2008 to 2019, Bulgaria's Press Freedom Index had fallen from 59th to 111th globally, according to former US ambassador James Pardew a product of the news-media monopoly of Delyan Peevski, and further compounded by Geshev's words of contempt for media "not to his liking." and the separation of powers, which he has denounced as a "far-right idea".

On 22 December 2022, United States congressman Warren Davidson issued a missive to the US Secretary of the Treasury Janet Yallen, lamenting the "corrupt actions" threatening "the stability and security of NATO allies in Europe" taking place in Bulgaria, stating that "the blatant disregard of US sanctions by the Bulgarian Prosecutor General is unacceptable and must be addressed". This comes after a Bulgarian court ruled that the Magnitsky Act, a measure intended to sanction foreign officials perceived as endorsing or engaging in acts of human rights violations or corruption, could not be applied in Bulgaria, thus contending to nullify the levity of sanctions placed on a number of high-profile Bulgarian oligarchs such as Delyan Peevski; and Vassil Bozhkov, whom Geshev had investigated previously for his involvement in bribery, but failed to apprehend before his flight to Dubai. Geshev states that the Magnitsky Act remains an "administrative and political tool of the USA", therefore not exerting any mandatory or legally binding judicial weight in Bulgaria, although Davidson expressed the conviction that the Magnitsy Act was the USA's most potent weapon in counteracting "shady businesses involved in corrupt practices and human rights abuses".

== Political career ==
Shortly after his removal as Chief Prosecutor, Ivan Geshev announced the formation of a civic movement "Just Bulgaria" which was seen as a precursor for the formation of a political party. The organisation claimed to be organised around conservative and patriotic values.

In November, he announced the formation of a broader political project called "Citizens Block" which was based around his own civic movement "Justice for Bulgaria".

On the 27 January, the "political platform" officially held its founding meeting in the city of Burgas, with Geshev outlining the goal of the organisation as being to "return power back to the citizens".

On the 22 April 2024, Geshev officially announced the participation of "Civic Block" in the June 2024 Bulgarian parliamentary election, together with the "Party of Bulgarian Women". The electoral coalition received 0.14% during the elections.

== Personal views ==
In a wide-ranging interview, Geshev saw the decision to keep churches open to the public for Easter in the midst of the COVID-19 pandemic in Bulgaria as a "sign from God that things will be all right for us [Bulgarians]." He went on to question the faith of other Orthodox churches that closed down services to the public, and described opposition to the decision in the country as an "anarcho-liberal circle which doesn't like anything Bulgarian or national." Geshev also cited the "anarcho-liberal" reaction following his nomination as a driving force to continue with the process. He revealed his personal philosophy is that "one is not a bad person for doing bad things but for enjoying them," and that he sees himself "as an instrument in the hands of God." He attempted to allay fears of an economic crash by sharing he has read that, if need be, the population could be fed fish for a year without any import.

== Personal life ==
Ivan Geshev has two daughters with his partner Detelina Hancheva. In 2019, media reported that Detelina Hancheva had common business interests with the key witness in the Mladost case in which Geshev was the main prosecutor. Neither the prosecution nor the Supreme Judicial Council opened an investigation to establish if this conflict of interest influenced the proceedings.
