= Bulgartabac =

Bulgarian tobacco company

Bulgartabac Holding Group AD
- Native name: Булгартабак
- Type: joint-stock company
- Industry: Tobacco
- Founded: 1947
- Headquarters: Sofia, Bulgaria
- Products: Tobacco
- Owner: VTB Bank
- Website: www.bulgartabac.bg

Bulgartabac Holding Group AD or simply Bulgartabac (Bulgarian: Булгартабак) is a Bulgarian tobacco holding company. Established in 1947 and based in the capital Sofia, it includes 11 joint-stock subsidiary companies in the tobacco-growing regions of the country.

Bulgartabac produces over 50 cigarette brands, monopoly of product, and sub-brands in its modernised factories in Sofia and Blagoevgrad using both domestic and imported tobacco. Amongst the company's brands are Victory, Rodopi, Haskovo, Gorna Djumaya (GD), Arda, Stewardess, Femina, Prestige, Eva, Bulgartabac, MM, Melnik, Seven Hills, Global, Bridge, Tresor, BT, Charlie, Nevada, Orient Express, Country, etc.

In 2011, A unit of OAO VTB, Russia's second-largest bank, was awarded a majority stake in Bulgartabac after the sole bidder offered to pay 100.1 million euros ($145 million) for an 80% stake.

== Controversies ==
Bulgarian news sources Sega and FOCUS linked Bulgartabac to reports that CorpBank banker Tsvetan Vasilev had ordered the assassination of Member of Parliament Delyan Peevski, prompting Bulgartabac to "declare war on CorpBank" and divest itself of all accounts within that institution.

A 2014 study on Transnational Tobacco Companies (TTCs) penetration of the Bulgarian market after the fall of communism and during that nation's accession into the EU concluded that Bulgartabac was involved with smuggling its own cigarettes out of, and back into, Bulgaria to avoid taxation.

Bulgartabac has been linked by Turkish Customs officials to a significant role in the production and illegal import of "cheap whites" - substandard cigarettes smuggled in through Iran and Syria to avoid taxation or safety quality standards. Allegedly "they are shipped through the Suez Canal and Red Sea, around the Gulf of Aden and up to Jebel Ali, the transit point. Once there, the tobacco is usually disguised as another product and given fresh paperwork before being shipped onwards to Iraq, where it is smuggled back across the border into Turkey without paying excise duty."

Despite the proximate location to their production facility, Bulgartabac publicly denied involvement with a 1.6 million dollar shipment of contraband cigarettes seized by Bulgarian customs authorities at the Port of Varna in 2010. An investigation into Bulgartabac's alleged role the incident, led by Bulgarian Finance Minister Simeon Dyankov, concluded that the cigarette manufacturer was not responsible but raised the concern that Bulgartabac did not have risk management systems in place to responsibly combat illicit traffic.

Recently, the Turkish Anti-Smuggling and Organized Crime Department (KOM) sent a report to Interpol complaining about cigarette smuggling by Bulgartabac and financing terrorism. While the ownership structure of the company is unclear, Bulgarian journalists claim its beneficial owner is Bulgarian media tycoon Delyan Peevski. Social activists argue that Bulgaria's General Prosecutor Sotir Tsatsarov avoids investigating Bulgartabac's smuggling on purpose. Former Bulgarian Minister of Justice Hristo Ivanov has drawn attention to the fact that the problem of cigarette smuggling by Bulgartabac is mentioned in every yearly report by the Turkish Anti-Smuggling and Organized Crime Department and that it is peculiar that Bulgarian authorities have not noticed.
