= Antoaneta Vassileva =

Bulgarian economist & professor (born 1960)

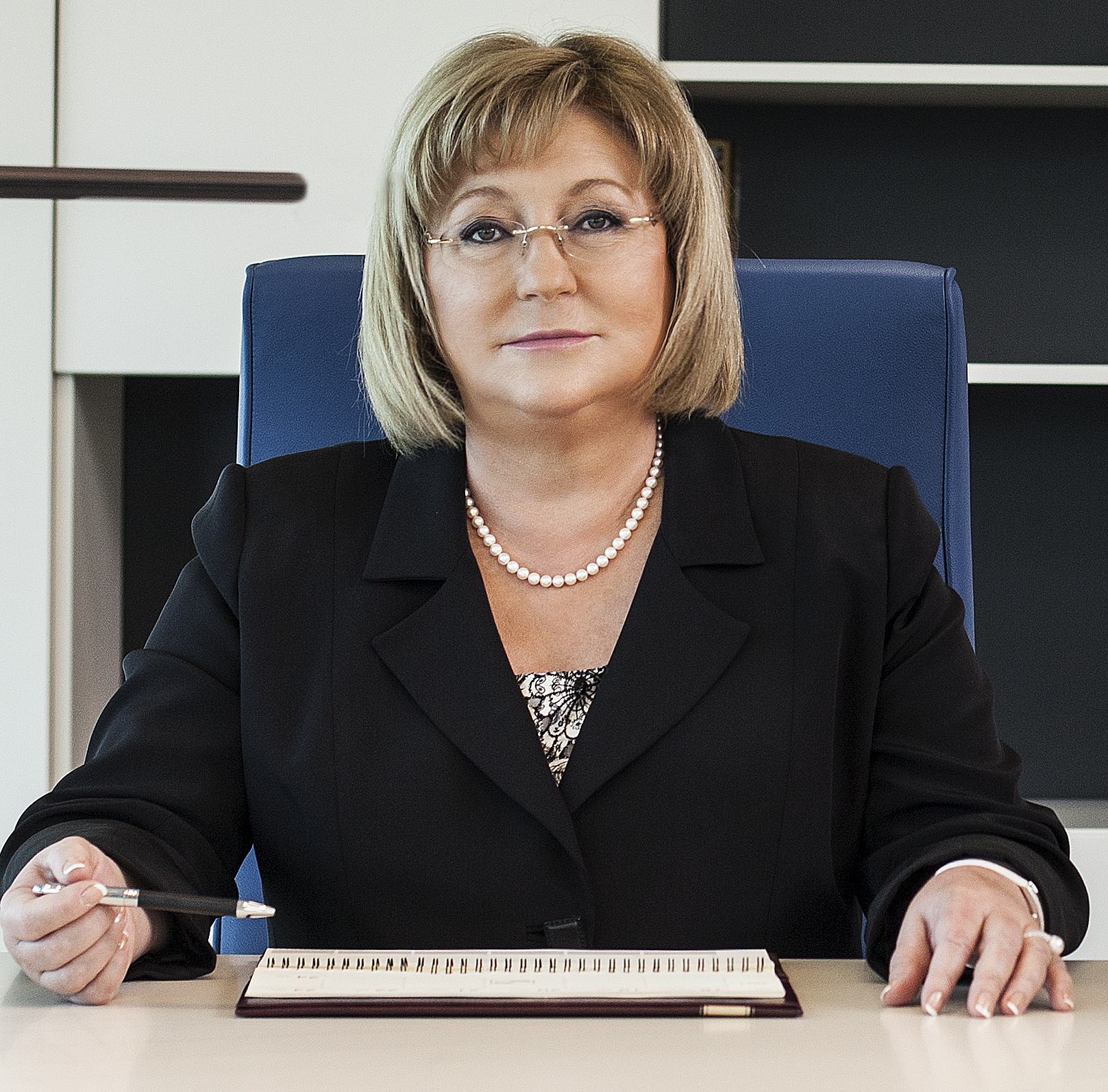
- Bulgarian economist
- Born: 1960 (age 65–66); Bulgaria
- Education: University of National and World Economy
- Occupations: Professor, Scientist in Economics

Antoaneta Vassileva (in Bulgarian: Антоанета Василева; born 1960) is a Bulgarian economist and Professor of Global Economics and International Economic Relations at the International Economic Relations and Business Department at the University of National and World Economy (UNWE). She was Dean of the International Economics and Politics Faculty of the UNWE from 2011 until 2014.

== Biography ==
=== Education ===
Vassileva graduated from the Karl Marx Higher Institute of Economics (today's UNWE) in International Economic Relations with distinction in 1984. She became a Doctor of Economics in Bulgaria in 2000 and a Doctor of Business Administration in the US in 2002.

She specialized in International Management and Marketing at the Barcelona Instituto de Estudios Superiores de la Empresa (1997), the London City University Business School (1997, 1998), and the Asia Pacific University in Beppu, Japan (2005).

=== Academic career ===
Vassileva is a professor at the Department of International Economic Relations and Business at the UNWE. She teaches International Business Operations, Regional Business Practices in International Business and International Marketing in Bachelors’ and master's degree programs for the International Economic Relations discipline in Bulgarian and English. She has lectured at Polish and Japanese universities. Vassileva delivers a course of lectures in the joint master's degree program by the UNWE and the Nottingham Trent University from the United Kingdom.

Between 2002 and 2006, Vassileva was the Director of the Center for International Economics, Politics and Law of the UNWE's Postgraduate Studies Institute. She is one of the founders of the Center for Management Skills Development of the Postgraduate Studies Institute and delivers lectures as part of the Bulgarian-Japanese course in Global Management and Leadership.

Vassileva participates in a number of national and international research projects, manager training and knowledge and innovation transfer projects, such as the Bulgarian-Japanese Management Skills Development project, the Bulgarian-Italian project on Partnership between Universities and Business and Economics and Management Training, and the Belgian-Bulgarian project on European Entrepreneurship Commitment.

Vassileva has led research projects on the International Competitiveness of Bulgarian Export Oriented Industries, and EU Budget Reform and Future EU Policy Financing.

Vassileva has published many papers at home and internationally. She has a wealth of practical experience in international commerce and investment and acts as consultant to Bulgarian companies on issues such as international cooperation, marketing, or Public-Private Partnerships. She is member of the Editorial Board of the International Relations Journal in Bulgaria, the Vision Journal in Macedonia, and China-USA Business Review Journal in the USA. She is a member of the European International Business Academy (EIBA), the Union of Economists in Bulgaria, and the founder of the Club of Commerce and International Business Specialists.

=== Personal life ===
Vassileva is the wife of Corporate Commercial Bank AD's majority shareholder Mr. Tzvetan Vassilev. She is the mother of legal scholar and social activist Radosveta Vassileva.

== Publications ==
=== Monographs and Textbooks ===
- Marketing: Prospects for Today's Business, a Team of Authors, the UNWE Publishing House, Sofia, 2013.
- The International Competitiveness of Bulgarian Export-Oriented Industries, a Team of Authors, the UNWE Publishing House, Sofia, 2012].
- International Business, the Stopanstvo University Publishing House, Sofia, 2011].
- International Business and Globalization, NBMG, Sofia, 2010].
- Modern Modes of International Business, NBMG, Sofia, 2010].
- International Marketing, as co-author, the Stopanstvo University Publishing House, Sofia, 2010.
- Public-Private Partnership: Business Aspects, Management, Challenges, as co-author, the Stopanstvo University Publishing House, Sofia, 2009.
- Global Management and Marketing — the Japanese Experience (as co-author), the Stopanstvo University Publishing House, Sofia, 2008. Also in Bulgarian.

=== Papers, Articles, and Reports ===
- Energy Security and Energy Consumption in Bulgaria – Vassileva A., S. Boneva, The Review of International Affairs, Belgrade, Vol. LXVI, No. 1157, January–March 2015.
- Creating Innovation and Development of a New Product (Managing Innovations) – Vassileva A., M.Tripunoski, A.Nikolovski, Forum Scientae Oeconomia, Volume 2, No 3, Academy of Business, Dabrowa Gornicza, Poland, 2014.
- International Competitiveness of Export-oriented Industries in Bulgaria – Vassileva A., Petkov, V., Zhelev, P., Chinese Business Review, Volume 13, Number 1, 2014.
- Applied Education, Investment in Social Skills for Better Social Economic Results – Vasileva A., M. Tripunoski, A.Nikolovski, Proceedings of the IV International Conference on Economic Development and Standard of Living, Banja Luka, EDASOL-2014.
- “Global Sourcing in International Business,“ the Economic Thought journal, Issue 3, 2011.
- “Public-Private Partnerships (PPP): an Innovative Approach offering Opportunities to Innovate” in Integrating Bulgaria in the European Innovative and Educational Area, Dimant, Burgas, 2009.
- “Public-Private Partnership in Higher Education” in University-Business Partnership: Bulgarian and European Dimensions, the Stopanstvo Publishing House, Sofia, 2009.
- “Features of University-Business Partnership in Japan” in University-Business Partnership: Bulgarian and European Dimensions, the Stopanstvo Publishing House, Sofia, 2009.
- “The Need to Improve Cooperation and the Transfer of Knowledge, Experience, and Know-How Between Universities and Business” in University-Business Partnership: Bulgarian and European Dimensions, the Stopanstvo Publishing House, Sofia, 2009.
- “The Debate on EU Budget Reform and the Bulgarian Contribution to it” in EU Budget Reform and Future EU Policy Financing, Mirage 96, Sofia, 2009.
- “Public-Private Partnership: Any Success Formulae?”, Ikonomicheski Alternativi, Issue 3, 2008. Also published in the Economic Alternatives Digest, Issue 2, 2008.
- “The Legal Regulation of Public-Private Partnerships and Public Awareness” in The Role of the Media in EU Financed Project Implementation, the Stopanstvo Publishing House, Sofia, 2008.
- Paradoxes of the Global Marketing Communication (Peculiarities, Improbabilities, Opposing Attitudes), (as co-author), Power of Communication 2013, Conference Proceedings, Belgrade, 2013.
- Marketing in the EU and After-Еffects for the Bulgarian Business, Vision, Association of Intellectuals, Skopje, Issue 15, 2010.
- Public-Private Partnerships: Formulae for Success, Incentives and Barriers (as co-author), Vision, Association of Intellectuals, Skopje, Issue 15, 2010.
