= Bulgarian Deposit Insurance Fund =

Deposit guarantee scheme

The Bulgarian Deposit Insurance Fund (BDIF, Bulgarian: Фонд за гарантиране на влоговете в банките) is a Bulgarian deposit guarantee scheme that is structured as a legal entity, established under the Law on Bank Deposit Guarantee (LBDG).

== History ==
The Bulgarian Deposit Insurance Fund (BDIF) is a legal entity, established under the Law on Bank Deposit Guarantee and functioning since January 1999. The BDIF is seated at 27 Vladayska Street, 1606 Sofia, Bulgaria.

In 2014, after a large commercial bank failed, the Corporate Commercial Bank (see seizure of Bulgaria's Corpbank), the European Banking Authority opened an investigation into Bulgaria's implementation of the Deposit Guarantee Scheme Directive. In 2016, the World Bank loaned EUR 300 million to BDIF.

== Functions ==
The BDIF activity aims at maintaining the stability of and the public confidence in the banking system. Its major functions include:

- determining and collecting annual premium contributions from all banks participating in the deposit insurance system;
- investing its funds in low-risk and highly liquid securities issued by first class issuers, and deposits with the Bulgarian National Bank (BNB);
- repaying in-full the insured deposit amounts of physical persons and legal entities up to the statutory limit;
- managing the resources of the Bank Resolution Fund; contributing to the efficient execution of the restructuring of credit institutions pursuant to the Law on Recovery and Resolution of Credit Institutions and Investment Firms;
- protecting creditors’ interests and controlling trustees’ activities under the terms of the Law on Bank Bankruptcy.

BDIF guarantees full repayment of deposits in levs and in foreign currency up to BGN 196,000 (amount includes accrued interest) on the 'per depositor per bank' principle (for the BDIF member banks). Additional protection up to BGN 250,000 for a term of three months is provided for the following types of deposits: deposits of individuals arising from transactions with real estates for residential purposes; deposits of individuals arising from amounts paid in connection with conclusion or dissolution of marriage, termination of a labour contract or civil service contract, disability, or death; and deposits arising from insurance or social insurance payments or from payment of compensation for damages from crimes or reversed sentence.

Some credit institutions are branches of banks from EU Member States and they do not participate in the deposit guarantee scheme in the Republic of Bulgaria since they are protected by the applicable home country scheme.

== Membership in international organisations ==
BDIF is a founding member of the International Association of Deposit Insurers (IADI) and of the European Forum of Deposit Insurers (EFDI).

== See also ==
- Financial Supervision Commission (Bulgaria)
- List of financial supervisory authorities by country
