= Corporate Commercial Bank =

Bulgarian bank

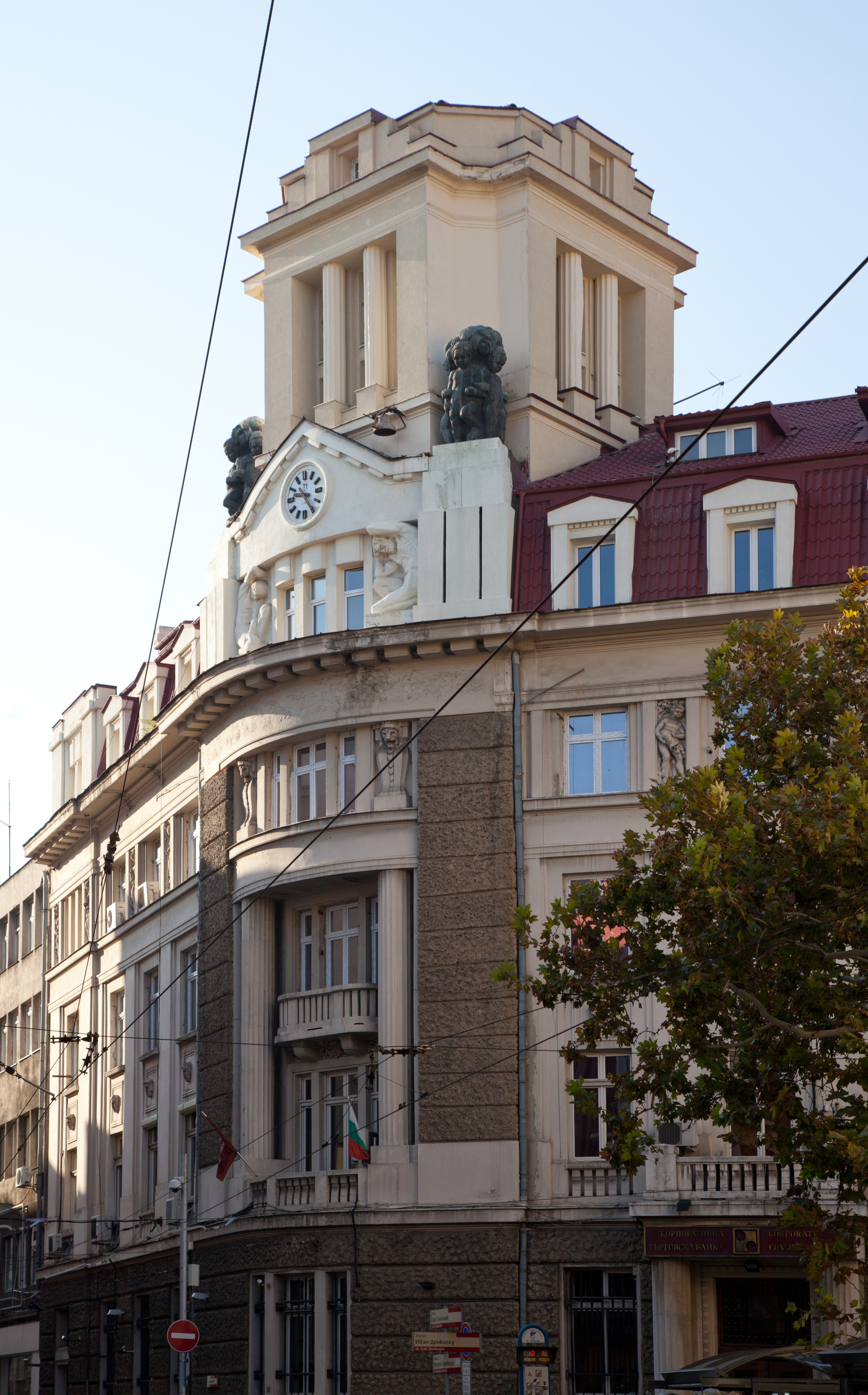
- The headquarters at Graf Ignatiev st., Sofia
- Native name: Корпоративна търговска банка
- Type: Public
- Industry: Financial services
- Founded: 1994
- Defunct: 2014
- Fate: Bankruptcy
- Headquarters: Sofia, Bulgaria
- Services: Retail, private and corporate banking
- Website: www.corpbank.bg

Corporate Commercial Bank AD (Bulgarian: „Корпоративна търговска банка“ АД), commonly called Corpbank, was a Bulgarian bank. Corpbank was a universal bank, serving both as a traditional commercial bank, as well as an investment bank.

According to official data from the Bulgarian National Bank (Bulgaria's central bank) at the end of November 2013, Corpbank was the fourth largest bank in Bulgaria in terms of assets, third in terms of net profit, and first in terms of deposit growth. Following a bank run in June 2014, which many believe was artificially induced, the bank requested special supervision by the Bulgarian National Bank. Its license was subsequently withdrawn by the Bulgarian National Bank in November 2014. However, in 2022, the European Court of Human Rights held the license was revoked in violation of the right to a fair trial and the right to property. The second largest shareholder in the bank litigated before the International Centre for Settlement of Investment Disputes. The chairman of the bank's supervisory board and majority shareholder, Tsvetan Vasilev, was granted political asylum in Serbia.

== Background ==
Since 2007, Corpbank had been a publicly traded company with a two-tier management system. The shares of the bank were traded on the Bulgarian Stock Exchange Bulgarian Stock Exchange (BSE) – Sofia AD. In 2009, 30% of the bank's capital was acquired by the State General Reserve Fund of the Sultanate of Oman through its subsidiary Bulgarian Acquisition Company II Luxembourg. In 2010, Fata Assicurazioni Danni S.p.A. and Fata Vita S.p.A. (subsidiaries of the Italian insurance holding Generali Group) acquired a minority stake in Corpbank. In 2013, 9.9% of the bank was acquired by one of the biggest banks in Russia, VTB Capital.

At the beginning of 2014, Corpbank signed an agreement with Credit Agricole S.A., France, to acquire 100% of the shares of Credit Agricole Bulgaria EAD's capital. The completion of the acquisition was expected to be done after an approval from the regulatory agencies.

=== Bank collapse and takeover ===
Following a bank run in the third week of June 2014, the administration of the bank was forced to seek conservatorship from the Bulgarian National Bank. The Bulgarian National Bank allegedly applied dual standards and did not provide liquidity help to Corporate Commercial Bank while it provided a liquidity injection to another bank which also faced a bank run at the same time, First Investment Bank. Contrary to standard practice in the sector, Bulgaria's government rejected a bailout proposal by the bank's shareholders too. Moreover, the Bulgarian National Bank withdrew the bank's license on 6 November 2014 based on a confidential report which it refused to make public. Corporate Commercial Bank's depositors have raised concern that the report allegedly relies on an obscure methodology which has significantly devalued the bank's assets.

Tsvetan Vasilev, the State General Reserve of the Sultanate of Oman, and the depositors of Corporate Commercial Bank appealed the decision before the Supreme Administrative Court of Bulgaria. The appeal was rejected with the argument that none of them had a "legal interest" in appealing the decision. One of the judges dissented based on case law by the European Court of Human Rights against Bulgaria. The State General Reserve of the Sultanate of Oman lodged a claim against Bulgaria for expropriation and violation of investor rights in breach of the Bulgaria-Oman Bilateral Investment Treaty. Vasilev, the management, and the depositors of Corporate Commercial Bank have lodged claims before the European Court of Human Rights. In 2022, the European Court of Human Rights held the bank's license was revoked in violation of the right to a fair trial and the right to property. The bank's bondholders have also threatened Bulgaria's government with legal action.

In 2017, Vasilev as well as the NGO "We, the Citizens", which represents thousands of depositors at Corporate Commercial Bank, submitted applications against media mogul Delyan Peevski and Bulgaria's General Prosecutor Sotir Tsatsarov under the US Magnitsky Act as they deem they devised a plan to artificially bankrupt Corporate Commercial Bank, so that its assets could be stolen. International depositors have submitted a claim under the US Racketeer Influenced and Corrupt Organizations Act in the United States District Court for the Southern District of New York against Delyan Peevski, the Bulgarian National Bank and others: the claimants submit the defendants engaged in fraud to deviate assets from Corporate Commercial Bank.

== Corporate management ==
=== Supervisory Board ===
- Tsvetan Vasilev – Chairman of the Supervisory Board
- Zlatozar Surlekov – Member of the Supervisory Board
- Abdul Salam Mohamed Abdullah Al Murshidi – Member of the Supervisory Board
- Faisal Amur Mohamed Al Riyami – Member of the Supervisory Board
- Lyubomir Denev – Member of the Supervisory Board

=== Management Board ===
- Orlin Rusev – Chairman of the Management Board, Executive Director
- Iliyan Zafirov – Member of the Management Board, Executive Director
- Georgi Hristov – Member of the Management Board, Executive Director
- Aleksandar Pantaleev – Member of the Management Board, Executive Director

== History ==
=== Purchase of Vivacom ===
In 2012, Vasilev bought a stake in Vivacom, which is the brand name of the Bulgarian Telecommunications Company EAD (BTC). Vivacom is the largest telecommunications company in Bulgaria. It is the leading market provider in a variety of telecommunications services, including landline, mobile, Internet, radio, and TV. Around 3,500 work for Vivacom, and it is headquartered in Bulgaria's capital, Sofia.

Back in 2007, AIG executed a buyout of Vivacom, after which Vivacom went heavily into debt. Vasilev spotted an opportunity and raised the capital to purchase the company. At one point, Forbes magazine ranked Vasilev as the second-most influential man in Bulgaria.

By 2014, Corpbank was Bulgaria's fourth-largest bank, and it had an extensive portfolio of companies that it owned or partially-owned. Corpbank was the only bank in Bulgaria investing in start-ups and entrepreneurs; as such, its profits and power grew.

=== DPS request of assets ===
Because of its growth, wealth, and power, in April 2014 one of the most influential political parties in Bulgaria called DPS visited Vasilev. The request was simple: transfer assets for free to the "mobster circle of DPS." Vasilev refused. DPS is a Bulgarian political party, which is also known as the Movement for Rights and Freedoms in English. Its recognizable members include Delyan Peevski, Ahmed Dogan and Yordan Tsonev.

=== Collapse and takeover ===
==== Run on the bank ====
In June and July 2014, Corpbank customers withdrew large amounts of cash in a panic, known as a "run on a bank". At the time, Bulgaria's central bank, Bulgarian National Bank, said runs on Corpbank were part of a "deliberate and systematic attempt to destabilise Bulgaria's banking system" by criminals using emails and texts. The messages urged people to withdraw their money from Corpbank and other large banks. It wasn't until later that the Bulgarian government blamed Vasilev himself for failure of the bank.

Typically, rumors that depositors' money is unsafe is how bank runs start. In the case of Corpbank, several Bulgarian media outlets ran stories accusing Vasilev of trying to organize the murder of Peevski. Prosecutors raided companies affiliated with Corpbank. They confiscated financial documents from those companies. Ultimately, the attempted murder charge was dropped in court. But before that happened, TV stations ran live feeds of the prosecution's raids. Over the course of 4 days, over 20 percent of Corpbank's assets were withdrawn in cash by depositors.

After the bank run, Corpbank was closed for about six months. Corpbank customers were unable to access their money because Bulgaria violated the Deposit Guarantee Scheme Directive, as established by the Court of Justice of the European Union. The Bulgarian government did not provide liquidity to help to Corporate Commercial Bank while it bailed out First Investment Bank which faced a bank run in the same period. According to Forbes, "Paying off depositors was therefore impossible. But reopening the bank was not an option either, since that would simply re-start the run. Therefore, the BNB kept the bank "on ice"."

In July 2014, Plamen Oresharski's government resigned and President Rosen Plevneliev appointed a caretaker government led by Georgi Bliznashki in August 2014. Important decisions regarding the fate of Corporate Commercial Bank and the stability of the banking system were taken at meetings organized by President Plevneliev. However, both President Plevneliev and his successor President Rumen Radev refused to make the minutes of these meetings public. After numerous claims against the Presidency by journalists and civil activists pursuant to the Law on Access to Public Information, the Bulgarian court forced President Radev to make the minutes public.

==== Bank collapse and government takeover ====
In late 2014, the bank collapsed which caused the largest financial crisis in Bulgaria since the 1990s. Bulgaria's central bank, Bulgarian National Bank, then took control over the bank.

Corpbank was officially shut down and its assets taken over by the Bulgarian National Bank in July 2014. According to media reports at that time, the shutdown was due to a dispute between Vasilev and "Bulgarian media oligarch Delyan Peevski."

Bulgaria violated European Union banking laws, specifically the EU Deposit Guarantee Scheme Directive. Bulgaria did not repay eligible deposits within 20 days following the bank's failure, as required by the directive. The Bulgarian Deposit Insurance Fund only had 1 billion euros, which was not enough money to repay the guaranteed deposits for Corpbank.

"Delyan Peevski is simply one of the main tools that the Bulgarian political mafia uses to blackmail Bulgarian business—the visible part of a rather large iceberg of corruption," Vasilev said in a Forbes interview. "The political mafia is persistently trying to downgrade what happened to Corpbank to a personal conflict between Mr. Peevski and me, which is utterly untrue. I had a conflict with the political mafia ruling the country, which has been blackmailing and threatening me for many years."

In addition, Bulgaria's government denied shareholders, including the State General Reserve Fund Oman, the right to bail out the bank. Subsequently, the Bulgarian courts did not allow the shareholders and the depositors to challenge the withdrawal of the bank's license. Vasilev and the depositors have submitted claims against Bulgaria before the European Court of Human Rights.

==== Charges against Vasilev ====
In March 2016, the Bulgarian government (through the Commission for Illegal Assets Forfeiture (CIAF)) filed a lawsuit against Vasilev as the main shareholder of Corpbank. The lawsuit accuses Vasilev of using bank money to personally acquire assets and property. The government's lawsuit seeks 2.2 billion leva, which is equivalent to $1.3 billion US dollars. Vasilev blames the failure of the bank on a plot hatched by his competitors and the government, ultimately to gain control over wealthy assets of Corporate Commercial Bank, such as the telecommunications company Vivacom. Media reports suggest that key assets of Corporate Commercial Bank have been deviated after the bank's closure by Biser Lazov, the main witness against Vasilev.

Vassilev was granted political asylum in Serbia. The Serbian court has refused his extradition to Bulgaria.

==== The position of the government and the critics ====
After the Bulgarian National Bank withdrew the bank's license and the Bulgarian administrative court did not allow the shareholders and the depositors to appeal the decision, Bulgaria's National Assembly formed a temporary committee to study the circumstances of the bank's failure in March 2015. The committee was headed by Desislava Atanasova, Minister of Health in Boyko Borisov's first government. Yordan Tsonev, member of the Movement for Rights and Freedoms (DPS), was also elected as a member of the committee. Maya Manolova who subsequently became Bulgaria's ombudsman in July 2015 expressed worries about the structure and hierarchy of the committee. NGOs representing the depositors at Corporate Commercial Bank complained from the lack of transparency of the hearings of the temporary committee: they argued the National Assembly denied them access to the hearing several times through administrative tricks such as changing the start of hearings in the last moment, refusing to grant them passes, etc. At the hearing which they managed to attend, depositors were interested to learn about the methodology based on which the assets of the bank were evaluated. They raised awareness about potential conflict of interest of the companies vested with the task to evaluate the bank's assets after its closure.

The temporary committee released a report within four months after it was constituted and unequivocally put the blame for the failure of Corporate Commercial Bank on Tsvetan Vasilev. Depositors claim that the report by the temporary committee is not based on real facts. Subsequently, members of the committee continued to assert Vasilev's guilt in public statements. In 2016, Desislava Atanasova argued: "The main objective of the committee was to highlight the whole process, whether this bank was operating normally or as a pyramid, which is undoubtedly proven." "With the report of the Temporary Parliamentary Committee assigned with investigating what has happened in Corporate Commercial Bank, several myths have been broken. Among them is that the bank could have been saved last year, as BNB Governor Ivan Iskrov says. "How can one institution be saved that is minus 4 billion levs?" Yet, Martin Dimitrov, member of Democratic Bulgaria, has raised awareness that exactly following the bankruptcy of Corporate Commercial Bank, the Governor of the Bulgarian National Bank Ivan Iskrov received extraordinary bonuses that are equivalent to at least 50% of his yearly salary. According to journalist Ivan Bakalov, Iskrov is implicated in the planning and organization of the bankruptcy of the bank.

Yordan Tsonev, member of the temporary committee from the DPS, also argued: "MRF is motivated to reveal the whole truth about Corporate Commercial Bank. Delyan Peevski has never been a shareholder in this bank, has never been involved in the bank's management, he and his family have returned all their loans to a penny. He has no preferential deposits and has no relation to this bank. Corporate Commercial Bank was created, operated and managed by its majority owner Tsvetan Vasilev as a financial pyramid. This is the finding around which almost all members of the Parliamentary Committee have agreed to. This was understood by the society immediately after the bankruptcy. Out of the 5.2 billion loan portfolio, 3.7 billion or 72% were given to companies related to Tsvetan Vasilev. All of them, a total of 117, were shell companies, through which lending went on one to the other, so that Tsvetan Vasilev could buy assets that were not pledged against the credits that the companies borrowed." Tsonev and Delyan Peevski introduced retroactive changes to Bulgarian bankruptcy law, which would arguably help Peevski acquire key assets of Corporate Commercial Bank.

Bulgaria's prosecution has also given numerous interviews and public statements about the Corporate Commercial Bank case. Prosecutor Ivan Geshev has stated: "This is the biggest financial fraud in the new Bulgarian history, which should also be compared worldwide. Corporate Commercial Bank for the past few years was not a bank, but rather a personal portfolio of the main shareholder. The bank distributed loans to companies that were recently created or could not afford to settle their contributions. For 116 million leva there are no documents as to how credits were granted. Others were given only for a day. Half of the loans were not well secured." Vasilev himself has argued that the bank used special purpose entities, which were controlled by the bank, to finance projects. Meanwhile, the Organized Crime and Corruption Reporting Project reported that Bulgaria's prosecution destroyed thousands of documents related to the Corporate Commercial Bank case after investigator Boyko Atanasov gave an interview to investigative media Bivol.bg in which he claimed there was a special unit in the prosecution which was "directly subordinate" to General Prosecutor Sotir Tsatsarov, Prime Minister Boyko Borisov and Delyan Peevski and "dealt with concealing crimes and tipoffs against people close to the government, and at the same time, uses signals and tipoffs to blackmail the inconvenient."

In the summer of 2014, Steve Hanke, an American economist at the Johns Hopkins University in Baltimore, Maryland, was also critical of the bank's management. As subsequent reports evidencing irregularities in the approach of the government towards Corporate Commercial Bank began to emerge, he has refrained from commenting. In December 2014, he emphasized that if the report based on which Corporate Commercial Bank's license was withdrawn was wrong even "within the range of 5%," then there were many questions "left unanswered."

==== The position of the depositors ====
The depositors of Corporate Commercial Bank have been raising their voices against the inadequate policy of the Bulgarian government since June 2014. They founded "We, the Citizens", an NGO which protects their interests through class action and social activism. The NGO's president has referred to the report prepared by the Committee headed by Desislava Atanasova, which allegedly "investigated" the case, as "tendentious and unsubstantiated." Representatives of the NGO have raised concern on multiple occasions that the decision to take Corporate Commercial Bank down was politically motivated and that government institutions, including the Bulgarian National Bank and the Bulgarian prosecution purposefully destroyed the bank through accounting tricks and forged evidence.

The president of the NGO "We, the Citizens" has also drawn attention to the various schemes employed by the government against the interests of the bank's creditors in the insolvency proceedings. In recent public opinion polls, 70% of the respondents said they believed Corporate Commercial Bank was purposefully bankrupted by the government, so that its assets could be plundered.

In November 2017, the NGO sent a letter to the Bulgarian President asking him for support in their fight for justice against "the corrupt executive and judiciary, the prosecution, and dependent media." They also informed him that they have submitted an application under the US Magnitsky Act against corrupt government officials. Previously, the depositors of Corporate Commercial Bank had lodged applications against Bulgaria before the European Court of Human Rights against the alleged illegal withdrawal of the bank's license.

The depositors' fears have been shared by Bulgarian economists, social activists, and government critics. Economist Vladimir Karolev has asserted that the insolvency of Corporate Commercial Bank was artificial and deliberate. Economist Kolyo Paramov has argued that Corporate Commercial Bank is "a victim of a political plot in which Bulgarian institutions participated." Former ambassador and current social activist Ilian Vasilev has stated that Corporate Commercial Bank is "the victim of an attack by Bulgaria's prosecution and Peevski."

=== Investments ===
Corpbank was a universal bank, serving as both a traditional commercial bank, taking consumer deposits and making loans to businesses throughout Bulgaria, and also as an investment bank, sometimes also taking equity stakes in its clients.

The Glass-Steagall Act mandates the separation of commercial and investment banking in the United States. In most of Europe, there is no regulatory distinction between the two.

Starting from scratch in 2001, it was a pioneer in export financing to Bulgarian energy producers and ammunition manufacturers previously without banking options. Bulgarian Defence Industry Association President Stefan Vodenicharov, whose members were Corpbank clients, called the government attacks on Corpbank "a crime" and lamented a dearth of banking alternatives for his members.

Unlike its rivals, Corpbank also made direct investments in its clients and emerging enterprises in Bulgaria, most notably the country's leading telecom Vivacom, which it bought from creditors in 2012.

Other investments of Corpbank include:

- Vivacom (renamed to Bulgarian Telecommunications Company) - biggest incumbent telecommunications company in Bulgaria
- National Unit Radio and TV Systems (NURTS) - telecommunications and mobile infrastructure company
- Avionams - helicopter repair company
- Dunarit - ammunition manufacturer
- Petrol AD - gas (petrol) stations
- Victoria Insurance Co. - a joint venture with Generali, an Italian insurer
- Telish & Castra Rubra Wineries - leading wine maker/exporter
- Rubin - glass container manufacturer
- Kostenets Paper Mill - paper mill company
- Rousse Shipyard - shipyard

== Products and services ==
Corpbank had established itself as one of the most dynamically developing banks in Bulgaria. The bank offered a wide range of bank services for both individual and corporate clients. According to its experts, the competitiveness of Corpbank was due to a number of factors among which: understanding of the target markets and focus on export oriented companies. The stable client base was due to the long-term relations with leading companies in the spheres of trade, energy and utility services, construction, etc.

== Corporate social responsibility ==
Corpbank conducted its corporate social responsibility by supporting initiatives and projects in the fields of education, healthcare, science, sports, culture, etc. Some of the initiatives included:

1. The Big Check initiative which awards every Bulgarian athlete, who has won an Olympic or World Cup title as well as golden medalists from European championships.
2. General sponsorship of the Bulgarian Volleyball Federation
3. The Wish Tree initiative, which is aimed at supporting the children from the Dragalevtzi orphanage and the Hristo Raykov orphanage in Gabrovo
4. Support for the Bulgarian Sports Federation For Children Deprived of Parental Care through the financial backing of the Federation's annual sports schedule (2012, 2013, 2014) as well as through methodological help.

== Awards and recognition ==
Corpbank received a number of awards and recognitions. The bank won the Dynamic Development Award of the Bank of the Year Association five times (2001, 2002, 2010 г, 2011, 2012), Zlatna Martenitsa from the Made in Bulgaria – Small and Medium Business Union in the financial institution with the most favorable credit policy category as well as many other recognitions and awards.

In 2012, the bank improved its ranking the See Top 100 Banks ranking by taking the 24th place among the biggest banks in Southeastern Europe. This is 11 positions higher compared to the 2011 ranking when Corpbank took the 35th position. In the beginning of January 2014, the Bulgarian Stock Exchange – Sofia AD awarded Corpbank with the 2013 Investment intermediary with the highest revenue on the BSE – Sofia award.

== Attitudes & Altitudes – Quarterly Economic Review ==
In the beginning of 2012 Corpbank began publishing Attitudes & Altitudes – Quarterly Economic Review of Corpbank. The publication has a Bulgarian and an English version. The publication was prepared by students from the University of National and World Economy and academicians from the university. The publication conducted an economic review of various sectors of the Bulgarian economy. It also contained interviews with experts and business leaders working in the sector that is covered in the each issue.

== Cultural heritage ==
Corpbank's headquarters was located at 10 Graf Ignatiev St. The headquarters of the Bulgarian Commercial Bank, the local bank with the largest capital at the time, was located in the same building from the end of the 19th century until the beginning of the 20th.

The project for the building was made in 1921 by Georgi Fingov, Dimo Nichev, and Nikola Yurukov from the Fingov, Nichev, and Apostolov architectural studio. The building was built in a baroque style which was typical for the beginning of the 20th century. Corpbank has preserved the authentic exterior and interior of the building to a great degree and that is why the building was named as a cultural heritage in 1978. The eminent Bulgarian banker and social figure Atanas Burov was part of the Bulgarian Commercial Bank's Management. The original bureau of Burov, where he worked while he was at the Bulgarian Commercial Bank, is kept at Corpbank's building. АД The monument of Burov was officially unveiled at the end of 2011. It is located in front of the Ivan Vazov National Theater and is built with funds provided by the Chairman of the Supervisory Board of Corpbank, Tsvetan Vasilev. The monument was built by the sculptor Professor Emil Popov and Petar Stryaskov, architect. Ilia Georgiev, Chairman of the Deserving Bulgarians Foundation is the initiator of the project.

== See also ==
- List of banks in Bulgaria
