= Ilian Vassilev =

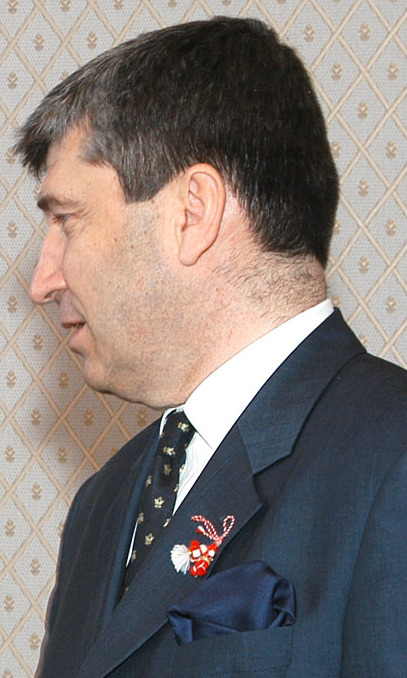
- Vassilev in 2003
- Born: July 7, 1956 (age 70); Bulgaria
- Known for: Diplomat, Blogger, Author
- Website: https://idvassilev.blogspot.com/

Ilian Vassilev (Bulgarian: Илиян Василев) (born July 7, 1956) is a Bulgarian diplomat, writer, and political blogger. He was President of the Bulgarian Foreign Investment Agency from 1997 to 2000, the Ambassador Extraordinary and Plenipotentiary of the Republic of Bulgaria to the Russian Federation from 2000 to 2006, following which he became Chairman of Deloitte in Bulgaria. At present he is Managing Partner of his own consulting company Innovative Energy Solutions. He is Chairman of the Reform Union Club (RUC) and Honorary Chair of the Bulgarian Economic Forum since its Foundation in 1997. Ilian Vassilev also coordinates the Sofia Business School, a joint undertaking of the RUC and the New Bulgarian University. He has served as advisor on energy related matters to succeeding Bulgarian governments and appears as a regular energy security commentator for western news outlets, including the Financial Times, Reuters, and others. He is also Chairman of the Board of the Alternatives and Analyses Foundation and producer of the Alternativata TV programme. He has been blacklisted to enter Russia in 2015 as one of the 89 European citizens.

== Energy security activism ==
Since leaving Deloitte in 2011 to found his own management consulting company, Innovative Energy Solutions, Vassilev has been an outspoken energy security activist, supporting the development of shale gas fields in Bulgaria, construction of the Nabucco pipeline project, and commentator regarding the viability of the Belene NPP, and the South Stream project.

== Political and social activism ==
Vassilev has built a reputation as a critic of corruption. He has been vocal about the fact that Bulgaria's Prosecution acts like a "baseball bat" and attacks those who criticize the status quo. He expressed worries in 2017 that Bulgaria's General Prosecutor Sotir Tsatsarov continuously exceeds his powers under Bulgaria's Constitution and acts like a hub spreading Russian influence in Europe. Vassilev has also raised concern about Bulgaria's practices of corporate-raiding and political repressions. In a commentary on his popular blog, he famously said: "You are an owner until Borisov and Peevski decide so." Recently, he underscored that the unexpected dismissal of an established journalist was an example of the authoritarian tendencies in Bulgaria.

== Bibliography ==
- Vassilev, Ilian (2005). Comeback to history - juxtaposing transition and globalization trends. East-West. ISBN 978-954-321-155-5.
- Kjell Engelbrekt and Ilian Vassilev, European Energy Policy Meets Russian Bilateralism: The Case of South Eastern Europe in Russia and Europe Building Bridges, Digging Trenches, Routledge, 2010

== See also ==
- Embassy of Bulgaria in Moscow
