= Financial Supervision Commission (Bulgaria) =

Financial supervisory authority in Bulgaria

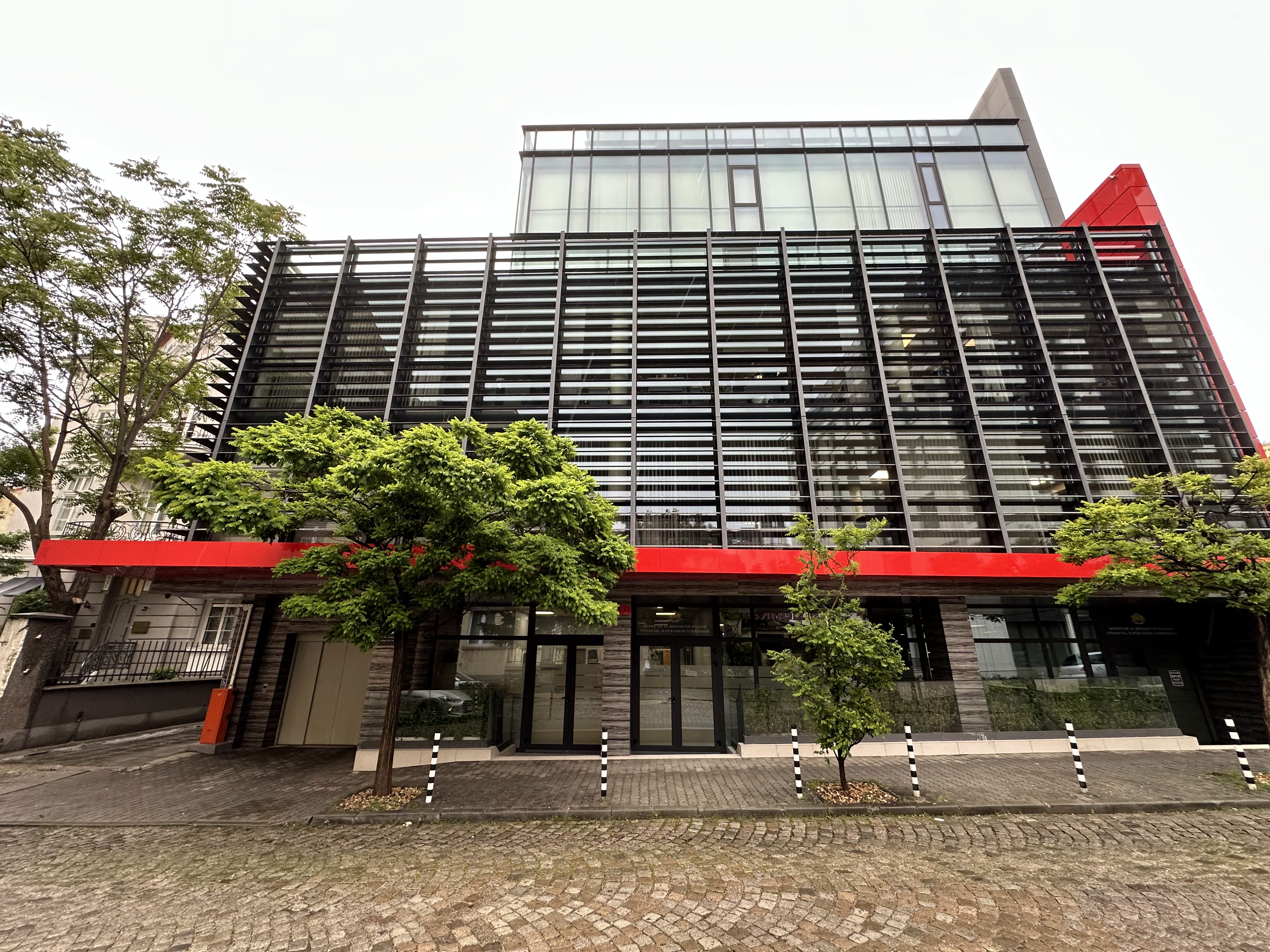
- Head office of the FSC in Sofia

Agency overview
- Formed: 1 March 2003; 23 years ago
- Preceding agencies: State Securities Commission; State Social Security Supervision Agency; Insurance Supervision Agency
- Jurisdiction: Bulgaria
- Headquarters: Sofia, Bulgaria
- Agency executive: Vasil Golemanski, Chair
- Website: www.fsc.bg

The Financial Supervision Commission (FSC, Bulgarian: Комисия за финансов надзор) is a financial supervisory authority in Bulgaria, based in Sofia. It oversees most parts of the financial sector outside the banking sector, which is under the authority of European Banking Supervision including the Bulgarian National Bank as national competent authority.

Under European Union policy frameworks, the FSC is a voting member of the respective Boards of Supervisors of the European Insurance and Occupational Pensions Authority (EIOPA) and European Securities and Markets Authority (ESMA). It is also a member of the European Systemic Risk Board (ESRB).

== History ==
The FSC was established on 1 March 2003 by new legislation, the Financial Supervision Commission Act, as an institution independent from the executive branch and accountable to the National Assembly. It took over the duties of three former agencies, the State Securities Commission (Държавна комисия по ценните книжа, est. 1995), State Social Security Supervision Agency (Държавна агенция за осигурителен надзор), and Insurance Supervision Agency (Агенция за застрахователен надзор).

== Overview ==
The FSC is led by a management board consisting of the chairman, three deputy directors, and one ordinary commission member. The mandate of the chair is six years. The three vice-chairs head the three main departments within the commission: Supervision of Investment Activities, Pensions Supervision, and Insurance Supervision.

== Controversy ==
In 2016, Bulgarian prosecutors found evidence that FSC chair Stoyan Mavrodiev had committed false declarations to a credit institution, which however came under statute of limitations.

== Leadership ==
- Apostol Apostolov, chair 2003 – 2009
- Petar Chobanov, chair 2009 – 2010
- Stoyan Mavrodiev, chair 2010 – 2016
- Karina Karaivanova, chair 2016 – 2019
- Boyko Atanasov, chair 2019 – 2025
- Vasil Golemanski, chair since 2025

== See also ==
- Bulgarian Deposit Insurance Fund
- List of financial supervisory authorities by country
