= State Agency for National Security =

Bulgarian governmental agency

- Държавна агенция "Национална сигурност" Darzhavna agentsiya "Natsionalna sigurnost"
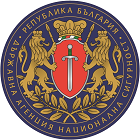
- Coat of arms of DANS

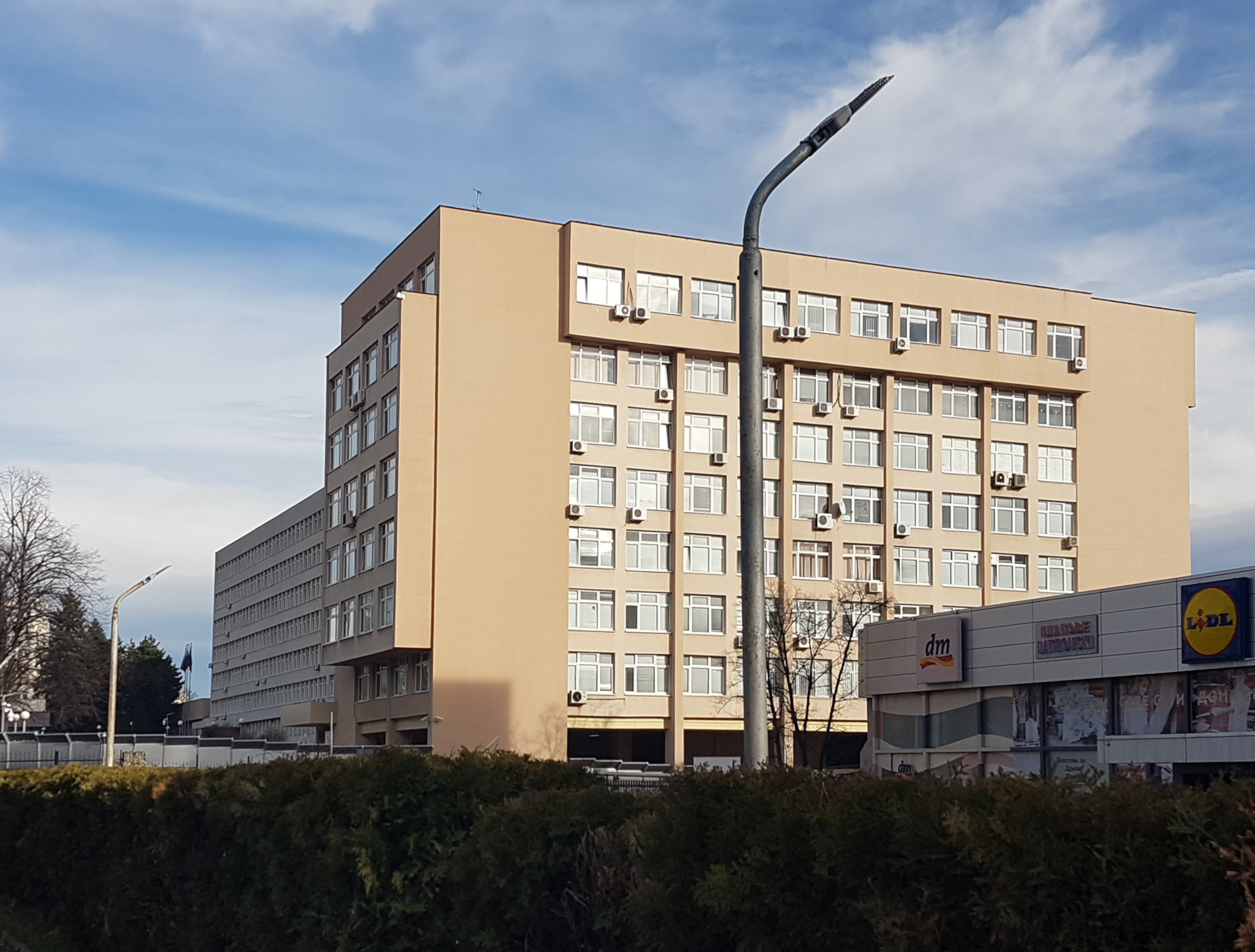

Agency overview
- Formed: 1 January 2008
- Preceding agency: Committee for State Security
- Headquarters: Sofia, Bulgaria
- Employees: Classified
- Annual budget: 108 million BGN (2015)
- Agency executives: Stancho Stanev, Acting Chairperson; Stancho Stanev, Deputy Chairperson
- Parent agency: Government of Bulgaria
- Website: www.dans.bg

State Agency for National Security (Bulgarian: Държавна агенция "Национална сигурност", ДАНС; Darzhavna agentsiya "Natsionalna sigurnost", DANS) is a specialized body for counterintelligence and security and its chief responsibility is to detect, prevent and neutralize the threats to the Bulgarian national security. It is the most powerful security agency of Bulgaria. The Agency is constituted to guarantee no foreign interference in the internal affairs of Bulgaria and to provide the highest state authorities with information necessary for conducting the national security policy and for the decision-making process in compliance with the national interests. In order to fulfill its duties, DANS uses in its work the whole spectrum of counter-intelligence means and resources. The Agency is responsible for constantly improving its capabilities as an integral part of the Bulgarian Intelligence Community, the National Security System and the security system of the democratic community of the EU and the NATO member states.
