= Sotir Tsatsarov =

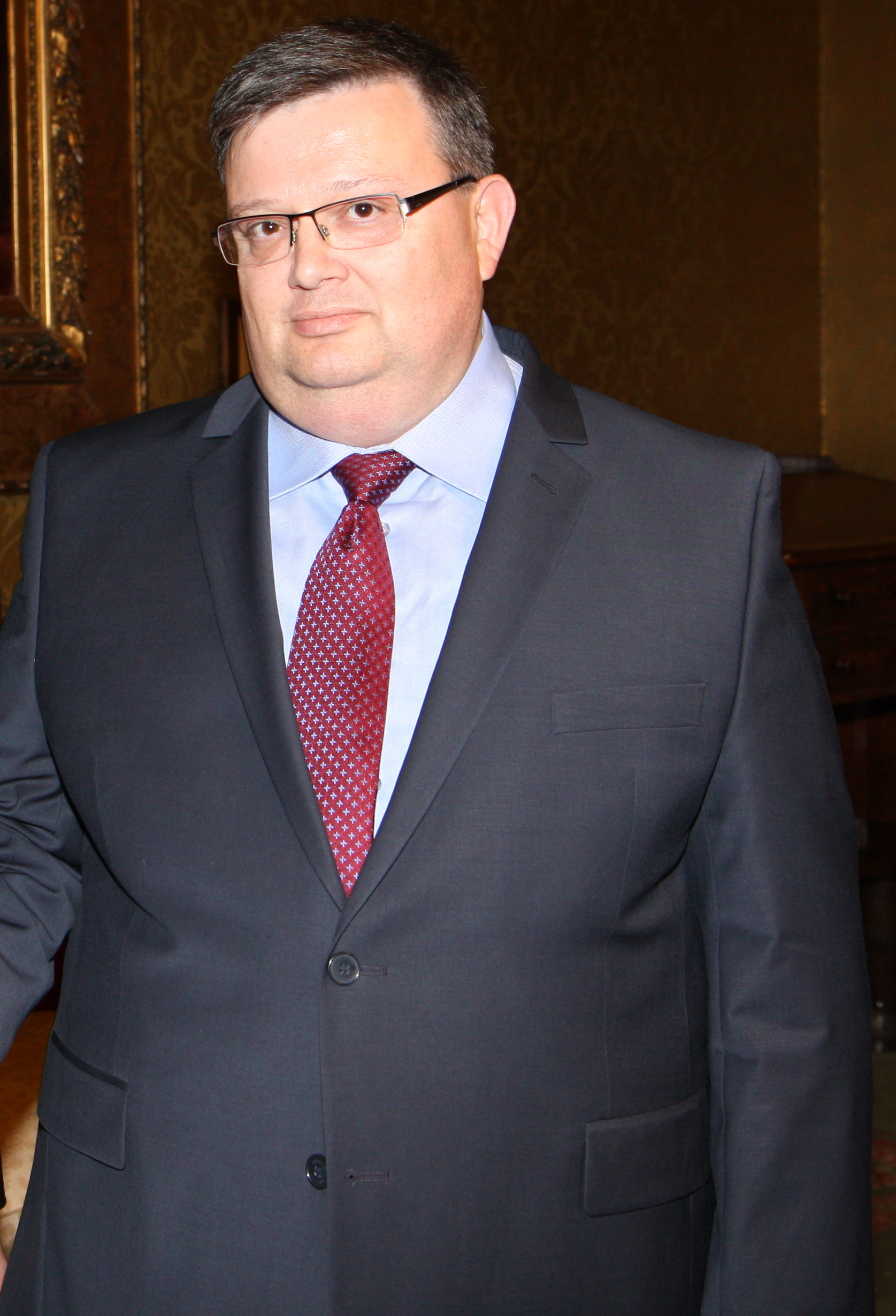

Personal details
- Born: 28 September 1966 (age 59) Plovdiv, Bulgaria
- Profession: Jurist, Prosecutor

Sotir Stefanov Tsatsarov (Bulgarian: Сотир Стефанов Цацаров) (born 28 September 1966) is a Bulgarian jurist who served as the chief prosecutor of Bulgaria from December 2012 until December 2019. Tsatsarov allegedly owes his appointment to Delyan Peevski, a media mogul and member of Bulgaria's Parliament, and Prime Minister Boyko Borisov. His time in office has been overshadowed by controversial investigations of political opposition leaders, famous businessmen, and independent media. Prominent Bulgarian jurists, including the heads of Bulgaria's main appellate courts, have asked for his resignation.

== Biography ==
Tsatsarov graduated from the Plovdiv Language School in his hometown of Plovdiv and was subsequently enrolled as a student at the juridical faculty of Sofia University. On 20 December 2012, he was elected as the chief prosecutor of Bulgaria, with 18 "yes" votes, 3 in opposition and 3 abstaining.

== Role in Corporate Commercial Bank corporate raid ==
=== Background ===
Corporate Commercial Bank (Bulgarian: Корпоративна търговска банка АД), commonly called Corpbank, was a Bulgarian bank. The bank's majority shareholder was Bulgarian businessman Tzvetan Vassilev.

=== Accusations against Vassilev ===
According to The Economist, at another point in time Tsatsarov ordered Bulgaria's national revenue agency to run at a tax audit on Vassilev, after a local activist group called "Protest Network" sent an alert to the Prosecutor General's office, making allegations about a connection between Vassilev, Peevski, and a Bulgarian newcomer politician named Barekov. In response to the “alert”, Tsatsarov ordered a magistrate to investigate all three. The audit of Vassilev's taxes covered ten years of history and was completed in 2012. Peevski and Barekov were both “cleared”. Another tax audit was initiated in 2014, following the attack on the bank and embezzlement charges. It has yet to be completed.

=== Bank investigation follow-up ===
In September 2014, Tsatsarov gave an interview with the media saying, “The financial demise of the bank is no solution for the people who deposited their money there.” According to the Sofia Globe, "He went on to suggest that the existing legal provisions that guarantee deposits of up to 196 000 leva, or 100 000 euro, should be ‘overleapt’ and the bank should be bailed out in full."

== Kostinbrod illegal ballot case ==
In May 2013, approximately 350,000 fake, or illegal ballot papers, were found by the State Agency for National Security (DANS) in a raid ordered by Tsatsarov in the town of Kostinbrod. The extra ballots were found the day before parliamentary election in Bulgaria, and the Multiprint printing house facility where the ballots were discovered was coincidentally owned by the Municipal Councilor of the GERB party, Yordan Bonchev. The scandal was believed to have influenced the results of the 2013 elections by allowing GERB party leader Boyko Borisov to manipulate the vote. Balkan Insight reported that “the case polarized public opinion, raising serious concerns about whether the election was fair.”

Two years later, the court rejected all of the prosecutor's charges in the case. Balkan Insight declared that the Kostinbrod scandal was "the investigation that has raised most concerns about Tsatsarov’s independence." The same article stated that "Bulgaria’s state prosecution has been involved in numerous controversial investigations, which have cast doubts that under the control of Sotir Tsatsarov, it is being used to serve political interests."

== Investigation into Hristo Biserov ==
Tsatsarov was involved in a November 2013 case in which Hristo Biserov, Deputy Parliament Speaker and senior leader of the Turkish Movement for Rights and Freedoms party (DPS), was accused of money laundering, tax crimes and document fraud. Biserov was forced to step down because of the charges and a two-year investigation was launched. Prosecutors subsequently demanded a four-year jail term.

In April 2015, Chief Prosecutor Tsatsarov announced that Biserov would be indicted before the Orthodox Easter holidays, and he was a few days later.

Two years after the start of the ordeal, a Sofia City Court officially cleared Biserov in December 2015 after failing to find evidence to support any of the allegations, Reuters stated.

== Bogomil Manchev accusations ==
Bogomil Manchev was the CEO and main shareholder of Risk Engineering, characterized by the Sofia Globe as "one of the most powerful figures in the energy industry in Bulgaria" when DANS and the Interior Ministry conducted a raid of the company due to "suspected fraud in the energy sector." Tsatsarov had mandated the investigation in a campaign to expose "the energy mafia."

Immediately after learning news of the investigation, Manchev was amenable and agreed to cooperate with the investigation, However, he maintained the raid of his offices was a "farce" and was firm in his convictions that his business and "every penny he earned from it were legal."

In October 2015 – similarly to the Biserov case – the investigation ended in failure for the prosecution due to the lack of evidence against Manchev.

== Accusation against Grisha Ganchev ==
Prominent businessman and entrepreneur, Grisha Ganchev, was indicted in December 2014, following a 2012 arrest, on charges of tax evasion, partaking in an “organized criminal gang” and for “threatening murder” of former head of the National Revenue Agency, Krasimir Stefanov. Stefanov told journalists that he had not been threatened at any point by Ganchev and would be unwilling to participate in the trial, as reported by Novinite.

The Specialized Prosecutor's Office, under Tsatsarov, submitted a second indictment in May 2015 against Ganchev, along with nine others, for tax fraud, alleging that Ganchev “masterminded” the group.

Ganchev was an entrepreneur and owner of many businesses in Bulgaria, including oil distributor Petrol AD and petro company Litex Commerce ASD. He was also a member of Bulgaria's Olympic Committee and of the Bulgarian Football Union.

Through his business ventures, Ganchev was credited with providing employment for thousands of Bulgarians "in one of the country’s areas that were hit the worst by changing economic realities" during the country's transition away from communism in the 1990s.

== Other scandals ==
=== Raid of the Fund for the Treatment of Children Abroad ===
In May 2016, Bulgaria's prosecution arrested five officials from the Fund for the Treatment of Children Abroad for corruption and allegedly participating in an organized crime group. Anti-Corruption Digest speculated that political motives underpinned the arrest, as Vladimir Pilosov was appointed new director of the organization in mere hours following the raid, which took place "minutes before the regular session of the council of the fund […] was due to decide on the treatment of 70 ill children abroad." Pilosov had just met with Borisov prior to his appointment as head of the Fund. Previous head, Pavel Aleksandrov, who was arrested in the raid, had been described by Krassimira Velichkova, director of the Bulgaria Charity Forum, as "the only director under whose management this fund has been working."

Balkan Insight characterized the investigation as “the most recent controversial case” and set the record straight that “later the prosecution rescinded some of its serious allegations against the fund’s officials,” but the Fund's reputation was already tainted.

=== Bulgaria Holding case ===
In the summer of 2012, Tsatsarov and the Prosecutor's office charged Ognyan Donev and Lyubomir Pavlolv of the Media Group Bulgaria Holding – which publishes Trud and 24 Chasa – with money laundering. The scandal ultimately resulted in the sale of Trud and 24 Chasa "to new owners" by the end of 2012. The identities of the new owners were not disclosed, according to independent watchdog organization, Freedom House.

=== Protests and Donchev controversy ===
Bulgarian citizens organized protests in Sofia, Plovdiv, and Varna to demand the resignation of Tsatsarov. One of the protest organizers said, “The credit of trust in the Prosecutor General has been exhausted. The reasons for his remaining in his post are [purely] political.”

A new controversy emerged when Sasho Donchev—owner of Overgaz (a Bulgarian gas company), the newspaper Sega, and head of the Bulgarian Chamber of Industry—was filmed complaining of “the alleged pressure applied to him by Tsatsarov.” According to Balkan Insight, “He claimed Tsatsarov had told him that his behaviour had become “unacceptable”, allegedly referring to his ownership of the traditionally critically minded daily paper and alleged links to a newly formed anti-corruption party “Yes, Bulgaria”.”

Tsatsarov denied Donchev’s claims and accused Donchev of “trying to influence a probe by the state energy regulator into the gas and petrol trade.” Boyko Borisov, the former Prime Minister of Bulgaria and likely next Prime Minister, “exonerated Tsatsarov’s role . . . saying that the prosecutor had likely fallen into a trap set by “red oligarchs”.”

In Bulgaria public opinion polls, distrust in the prosecutor's office is at 94 percent.

=== Cigarette smuggling controversy ===
In November 2017, Turkish state authorities sent a report to Interpol about cigarette smuggling by the Bulgarian company Bulgartabac. It appears the proceeds are used to finance terrorism. Although Bulgartabac's ownership was restructured several times, Bulgarian journalists claim its beneficial owner is controversial media mogul Delyan Peevski. It has been suggested that Tsatsarov has purposefully avoided investigating Bulgartabac's smuggling due to his good relations with Peevski.
