= Delyan Peevski =

Bulgarian politician and oligarch (born 1980)

- Делян Пеевски
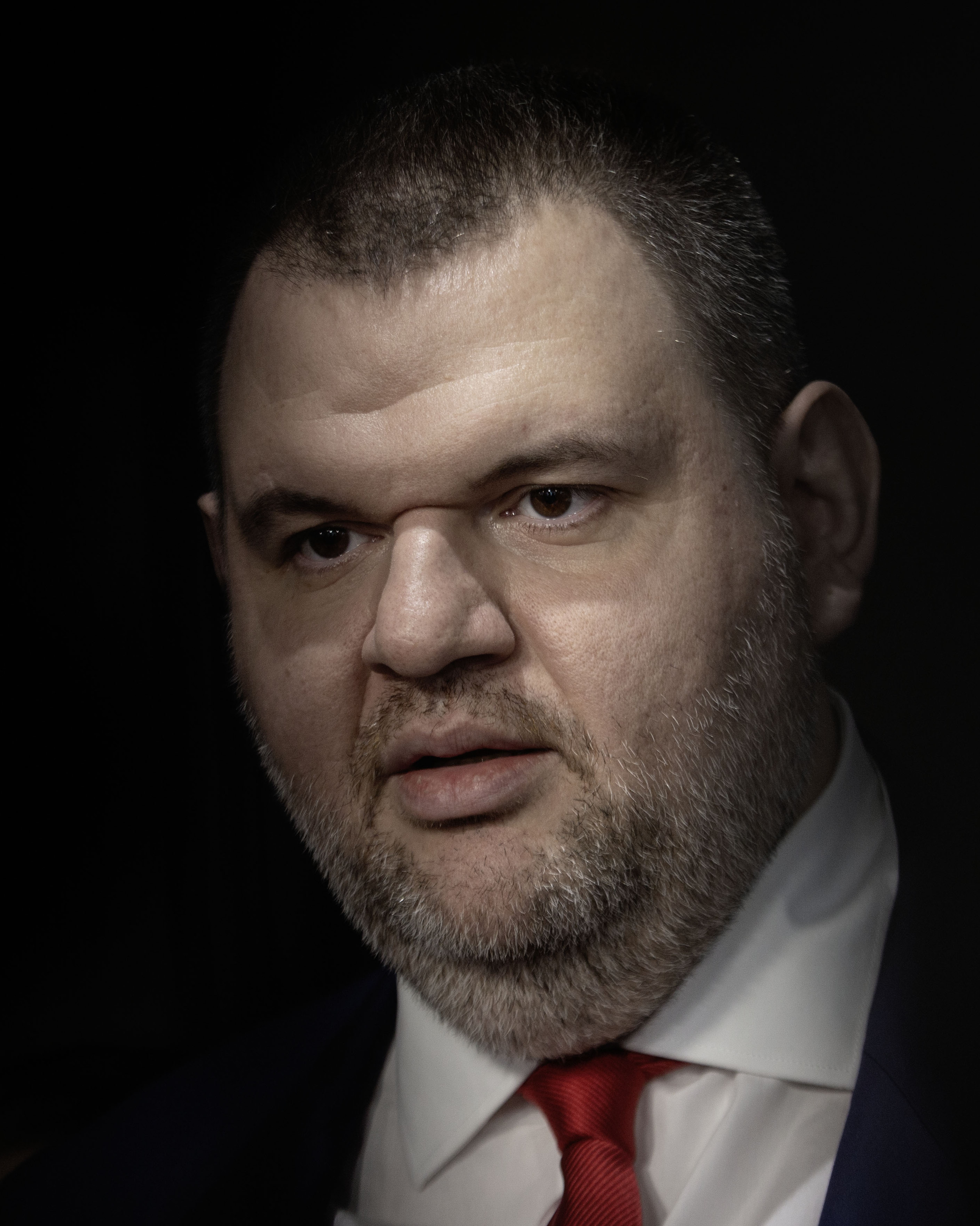
- Peevski in 2025

Leader of the Movement for Rights and Freedoms
- Incumbent
- Assumed office 24 February 2024
- Preceded by: Mustafa Karadayi

Member of the National Assembly
- Incumbent
- Assumed office 3 December 2021
- Constituency: 1st MMC - Blagoevgrad
- In office 14 July 2009 – 26 March 2021
- Constituency: See list: 13th MMC – Pazardzhik (2009–2014) 27th MMC – Zagora (2014–2017) 1st MMC – Blagoevgrad (2017–2021)

Personal details
- Born: Delyan Slavchev Peevski; 27 July 1980 (age 46) Sofia, PR Bulgaria
- Party: DPS (since 2009)
- Other political affiliations: NDSV (2001–2009)
- Domestic partner: Tsvetelina Yaneva
- Children: 2
- Education: South-West University
- Occupation: Politician; entrepreneur; lawyer

Delyan Slavchev Peevski (Note: pronounced [dɛˈʎan ˈpɛɛfski]) (Bulgarian: Делян Славчев Пеевски, born 27 July 1980) is a Bulgarian politician and oligarch, who serves as the leader of the Movement for Rights and Freedoms (DPS). He is sanctioned by both the United States and the United Kingdom for corruption, bribery and embezzlement. He is also a former media mogul and is a member of the National Assembly of Bulgaria since 2009. A member of DPS, which he leads since 2024, Peevski was elected as the director of the State Agency for National Security in 2013, which triggered the 2013–2014 Bulgarian protests against the Oresharski cabinet that led to the eventual resignation of Prime Minister Plamen Oresharski.

In June 2021, the United States Department of the Treasury designated Peevski, the public official Ilko Zhelyazkov, and the Bulgarian oligarch Vasil Bozhkov, along with 64 entities owned and controlled by Bozhkov and Peevski, for their roles in public corruption, pursuant to Executive Order 13818, which builds upon and implements the Global Magnitsky Human Rights Accountability Act. Simultaneously, UK also sanctioned several high-profile Bulgarian figures, including Peevski, under the Global Anti-Corruption Sanctions Regulations from 2021. According to Radio Free Europe, "Peevski is a notorious embodiment of the collusion between media, politicians, and oligarchs".

== Early life, family and education ==
He was born on 27 July 1980, in Sofia. Peevski graduated from 119 SOU in Sofia in 1998 and completed his legal studies at the South-West University in 2003. Since his graduation Peevski has donated large amounts of money and equipment to his alma mater and has spread his donations across several other universities during the COVID-19 pandemic.

Peevski is the son of the former chief of the Bulgarian sport totalizer, Irina Krasteva, who founded the New Bulgarian Media Holding Group in 2007. Limited information is publicly available about his father or other family members. Peevski is reported to have two children. His personal life remains largely private, although media outlets have linked him to Bulgarian pop-folk singer Tsvetelina Yaneva.

== Political career ==
=== Early political career ===
In 2001, Peevski joined the National Movement Simeon II (NMSII), being one of the founders of the parties youth wing. Shortly thereafter, he was appointed as the parliamentary secretary to transport minister, Plamen Petrov, after the election of the Sakskoburggotski Government. Former Corporate Commercial Bank director, Tsvetan Vasilev alleges that he became acquainted with Peevski during this period of time. In this role, his name was further mentioned in relation to various privatisation schemes, specifically the privatisation of sport facilities in Sofia. Additionally, he was appointed as a member of the board of directors of "Varna Port", although he was removed from the board after parliamentary protests.

In 2004, Peevski temporarily left politics, working as a consultant for the private company, TV "Globus". In 2005, he was exceptionally appointed as an investigator by the Supreme Judicial Council, after a letter of recommendation by the Chief of the Investigative Service, Angel Aleksandrov. Half a year later, he was appointed as deputy minister for emergencies and disasters from the quota of DPS.

In 2007, he was fired as a deputy minister during the Socialist-led government in a corruption scandal, with the director of Bulgartabac accusing him of abuse of power. After being fired, Peevski attempted to return as an investigator, however his request was initially rejected by the Supreme Judicial Council, who found that he did not have the necessary "moral qualifications" for the role. He challenged the decision at the High Arbitration Court, who ruled in his favour and restored him to the position in June, 2007. Peevski briefly returned to the agency prior to the 2009 Bulgarian parliamentary election. While Peevski was investigated for corruption, the investigation was dropped in November 2007 and he was restored as deputy minister by Sergei Stanishev.

=== MP from DPS ===
In 2009, Peevski was elected as an MP from DPS. He served as a member of the Committees for Internal Security, and Justice. He was further nominated to serve on the Anti-Corruption Commission, however his candidacy was rejected by the parliament. In 2010, a photo was circulated by the newspaper Capital of Peevski allegedly meeting with then-deputy finance minister, Vladislav Goranov. He voted against a vote of no confidence in the Borisov I cabinet. After the dissolution of the 41st National Assembly, Peevski was restored to his position as an investigator by the Supreme Judicial Council; however, he left the position after two weeks due to being nominated as an MP-candidate from DPS. In the election campaign, he expressed severe criticisms of the preceding Borisov government.

==== Oresharski Government ====
Peevski was elected as an MP in the 42nd National Assembly. He was a vocal supporter and voted in favour of the Oresharski Government. During debates about the cabinet, former minister of the interior, Tsvetan Tsvetanov, claimed that Peevski had been present in meetings between the government and General Prosecutor, Sotir Tsatsarov, at the prosecutor's request. Tsatsarov denied the accusation. On 14 June 2013, Peevski was elected as head of the State Agency for National Security, with the votes of 116 MPs. Peevski accepted the position and promised to work in an unbiased manner in the interests of the country.

The election of Peevski was accompanied by severe criticism from opposition politicians and members of civil society. President Rosen Plevneliev called on the National Assembly to review its decision, and summoned a Consultative Council for National Security in order to understand the reasoning behind Peevski's appointment. A number of civil society organisations signed an open letter requesting the reversal of the decision. Ambassadors from Bulgaria's NATO allies, as well as members of the European Parliament, expressed scepticism about the choice, as well as the procedure behind the election.

The spread of the news lead thousands of Bulgarians opposed to the decision to gather in front of government headquarters in Sofia to protest against the surprising appointment, chanting "Mafia" and "resign". In a letter sent on 15 June, which was widely seen as in response to pressure from the protests, Peevski submitted his willingness to resign "in the interests of the country", while simultaneously criticizing his political opponents. Prime Minister Oresharski accepted his resignation and submitted it before the National Assembly, with the parliament unanimously approving it on 19 June.

Following his resignation as head of DANS, Peevski withdrew his resignation as an MP. After a couple of months of lack of clarity whether under these conditions Peevski was still considered an MP, in October 2013 the Constitutional Court decided that he still was an MP. Peevski accepted the ruling, stating that it was a victory for democracy. The ruling was confirmed by a secondary ruling in December, 2013, after the initial ruling was challenged by President Plevneliev. Peevski co-authored a law with DPS MP Yordan Tsonev on restricting the activities of off-shore companies in the Bulgarian economy, submitted to the National Assembly in October, 2013. The law was approved in December, 2013.

In early 2014, Peevski engaged in a conflict with GERB MP, Tsvetan Tsvetanov, accusing Tsvetanov of exercising undue influence within the judicial system and of allegedly requesting that media affiliated to Peevski "protect criminal leaders". In an open letter to the media, he confirmed that he had met with Tsvetanov "40 times" during his tenure as Minister of the Interior, although he refused to disclose the nature of the meetings. In a later statement he claimed that the meetings were at the initiative of Tsvetan Tsvetanov, including an alleged meeting during which Tsvetanov attempted to intimidate Peevski. DPS leader Lyutvi Mestan further claimed that Peevski had met with Boyko Borisov and urged him to reveal the nature of their discussion. Tsvetan Tsvetanov for his part accused Peevski of using the meetings to attempt to influence his activity, especially in the "mixed regions".

In February 2014, after a signal by the protest group, "Protestors Web", the general prosecutors office announced a "full investigation" into Delyan Peevski, banker Tsvetan Vasilev and journalist Nikolay Barekov. The group further asked for clarifications from security services about the access that Peevski received to classified information on 11 August. In January, 2015, the Sofia city prosecutors office announced that they wouldn't be opening a case against Peevski based on the report due to a lack of evidence.

In May 2014, Peevski was elected to the European Parliament as part of the DPS list, but immediately thereafter decided to give up his seat. He explained that his motivation to participate in the European elections, while not taking his seat, had been to restore his reputation. In mid-June 2014, three people were arrested due to their involvement in an alleged murder plot against Peevski, but they were released because of a lack of sufficient evidence. Peevski condemned the court's decision and claimed that chief of the Corporate Trade Bank, Tsvetan Vasilev, had ordered the assassination. In late June, the prosecutors office opened an investigation into potential death threats issued by Peevski against Vasilev in private communications. On 16 July, Peevski announced that the case against him had been dropped. After the resignation of the Oresharski government, Peevski was once again selected as a candidate from DPS for the 2014 Bulgarian parliamentary election.

==== Post-Oresharski activity ====
In 2016, Peevski, Yordan Tsonev and former minister of finance, Petar Chobanov, proposed a new law in the aftermath of the bankruptcy of the Corporate Trade Bank. The law proposed an urgent amendment to the Bank Insolvency Act in order to allow the publicizing of the report of AlixPartners Services UK LLP, which was contracted to trace and take action for the preservation and recovery of the assets of the failed Corporate Commercial Bank (KTB), Bulgarian News Agency reported. After the amendments were adopted, the report was translated in Bulgarian and published in May 2016. According to the document, the audit confirmed that the bank functioned as a financial pyramid and was siphoned off through large loans to companies related to the majority shareholder Tzvetan Vassilev. More than half of the loans at the value of 2,5 billion BGN were given to companies related to Vassilev. The report also shows that the majority shareholder also used the bank for "personal transactions".

In 2018, he once again proposed amendments to the Bank Insolvency Act together with two MPs from the parliamentary group of the DPS - Yordan Tsonev and Hamid Hamid. The amendments were adopted in February 2018. According to the movers' reasons, the idea of the amendments is to establish an effective mechanism for replenishing a bankrupt bank's bankruptcy estate and to suppress schemes for plundering assets purchased directly or indirectly on money originating from such a bank. The president of Bulgaria Rumen Radev vetoed the amendments. His veto was later overturned by the MPs and the amendments were conclusively adopted by the Parliament on 7 March 2018.

On 4 July 2018 the National Assembly approved a bill, proposed by Peevski and his colleagues Yordan Tsonev, Hamid Hamid and Velislava Krusteva concerning the financing of media organizations. Authors stated that the legislation aimed to bring full transparency on the media sector now having problems with online media outlets, whose owners and financing are unknown. And to show whether or not this is a monopolist market. Yet, the opponents of the amendments stated that the bill attacks Delyan Peevski's rivals because it requires disclosure of all sources of financing of media organizations other than the proceeds from advertising and bank loans. The opponents of the bill state that "it is aimed against the opposition-minded news media, which use financing from non-government organizations and foreign grants". The day after bill's approval, Peevski, Hamid, Tzonev and Krusteva moved additional amendments requiring disclosure of bank loans and advertising incomes as well in order to meet the expectations of society. Yet the bill is still under attack by its opponents. Peevski was said to have the lowest attendance in the 44th National Assembly. He has appeared in only one plenary session, according to data from December 2017. Prior to the April 2021 Bulgarian parliamentary election, Peevski wasn't nominated as a candidate from DPS.

==== Return to the National Assembly ====
Peevski did not participate in the 45th or 46th National Assemblies but returned after being elected as a member of the 47th National Assembly. After the Russian invasion of Ukraine in February, 2022, Peevski was a staunch supporter of Bulgarian humanitarian and military assistance to Ukraine. The legislative efforts of Peevski within the 49th National Assembly were focused mainly on the judicial reform, Bulgaria's support for Ukraine and enforcement of the EU sanctions against Russia. Delyan Peevski was among the 166 MPs who filed amendments to the Constitution of Bulgaria on 28 July 2023. The draft law was submitted by members of the parliamentary groups of "We Continue the Change-Democratic Bulgaria", GERB-UDF and the opposition Movement for Rights and Freedoms (MRF).

Peevski along with the Movement of Rights and Freedoms (MRF) Chairman Mustafa Karadayi and four other MPs from the opposition MRF filed in July 2023 a bill to amend and supplement the Investment Promotion Act. The draft legislation set up a mechanism for the implementation of Regulation (EU) 2019/452 of the European Parliament and of the Council of 19 March 2019 establishing a framework for the screening of foreign direct investments into the Union. The bill was particularly important, considering that the malicious (mainly Russian) corrosive capital tends to increase on a global scale, especially in the context of the unprovoked Russian military invasion in Ukraine. Furthermore, he was among the MPs who signed and filed a bill, allowing the state to terminate the concession of the Port of Rosenetz, held by the Russian owned company Lukoil Neftohim. He also filed along with other MPs from MRF, GERB and PP-DB a second bill, which aims to end the derogation from the EU sanctions, allowing Bulgaria to continue importing Russian crude oil. Peevski has criticised PPDB for their decision to not support the immediate cessation of the derogation of the Rosenets Refinery to Lukoil in October and November 2023, even going as far as to characterise them as "Pro-Putin" parties.

On 6 July 2023, in extension to DPS's support for Ukraine, the party's chairman Mustafa Karadayi, Delyan Peevski, deputy chair of the 49th National Assembly Filiz Hyusmenova and deputy chairman of the party Yordan Tsonev met with Ukrainian president Volodymyr Zelenskyy, who visited Bulgaria. On 16 October 2023 he became co-chair of the Parliamentary group of DPS. Peevski criticised the response of PM Nikolay Denkov to the onset of snow storms and extreme weather in late November 2023, claiming that the PM must "leave his warm and cushy office and go help people in need". Responding to the Denkov's statement that if he wishes to help the people he should "go outside with a shovel instead", Peevski claimed that Denkov had shown himself incapable of fulfilling the role of Prime Minister and declared his willingness to serve as Prime Minister "for at least a month".

On 30 November, during a debate about the appointment of the Vice-Chief of the National Health Insurance Fund, Peevski and PP co-leader Kiril Petkov engaged in an aggressive argument at the front-bench, which allegedly included the use of vulgar language. During a debate around the proposed Constitutional Amendments, Peevski, among with other DPS MPs engaged in a scuffle with MPs from the Vazrazhdane Parliamentary Group, who were attempting to cut the audio system within the parliament in order to disrupt the debate. Peevski voted in favour of the proposed Constitutional Amendments in all their readings, stating upon the conclusion of the process on December 22, 2023, that Bulgaria has now "truly become a parliamentary republic" in reference to the decreased powers of the presidency. On 28 December, Peevski submitted an official complaint to the Ministry of Interior and the Prosecutors Office due to the release of footage from the center of Sofia by a Russia-1 film crew, despite an official ban on the news station within the territory of the European Union. In late January 2024, Peevski engaged in a number of arguments with incumbent president Rumen Radev, calling on Radev to resign if he wishes to engage in active politics and alleging that the president was engaged in corrupt activities.

=== DPS Leader ===
On 7 November, after a period of public absence, DPS Chairman Mustafa Karadaya announced his intention to resign, leaving Honorary President Ahmed Dogan the acting leader. The resignation of Karadaya left Peevski as the sole Chair of the DPS Parliamentary Group in the Bulgarian Parliament. During an emergency meeting of the Central Council of DPS on 17 November, chaired by Peevski, he officially announced his intention to run for the position of chairman of the party. During the meeting, Honorary President and Acting Chairman Dogan characterised Delyan Peevski as a "phenomenon of Bulgarian politics" and praised his skills as a political leader. Shortly thereafter, 10 of the 28 Regional Councils of DPS officially endorsed Peevski's candidacy for chairman of the party. By the end of November 2023, 22 party organizations out of 28 had endorsed Peevski.

On 26 November, Peevski attended a conference of the DPS Youth Wing, and gave a short speech in which he promised to support and coordinate with them if he was to be elected chairman. Also on 26 December, Peevski attended the commemorative rally for the youngest victim of the "Revival Process", being the most senior DPS figure to attend it that year. On 3 January 2024 to commemorate the founding of DPS, Honorary President Ahmed Dogan published an address to the party membership, in which he nominated Delyan Peevski to serve as co-chairman with experienced DPS MP and ex-Minister Dzhevdet Chakarov- with Chakarov being responsible for the international standing of the party and its "traditional regions", while Peevski would be responsible for parliamentary activity and expanding the electorate of the party. The move by Dogan was seen by analysts as a response to internal opposition to Peevski's candidacy due to him being the first non-ethnically Turkish candidate for partisan leadership, as well as the potential implications of the election of Peevski in regards to DPS relations with Turkey and EU institutions.

Peevski similarly published an open letter to the DPS membership, in which he outlined his own motivation to "restore a connection with the people and the political class" and underlined his commitment to the "mission" of DPS. On 30 January 2024, Peevski, together with Chakarov, met the foreign minister of Turkey, Hakan Fidan, which was seen as a sign of approval of the new DPS leadership by the Turkish government. During the National Forum of DPS, Peevski was elected as co-leader together with Dzhevdet Chakarov.

== Business activity ==
In 2007, Peevski's mother, Irena Krasteva, founded the "New Bulgarian Media Group", and acquired a number of popular newspapers. In 2015, Peevski confirmed in his declaration that he owned half of the shares within the group. By 2013, the media company controlled by Peevski and his mother owned six of the 12 largest circulating newspapers, being described as a "media empire. It also had a monopoly on newspaper distribution and digital TV channels. By 2016, according to Radio Bulgaria, the number of newspapers he owned increased to more than 20. According to Reporters Without Borders, his media group consisting of 6 newspapers, "New Bulgarian Media Group" controls nearly 80% of print media distribution. Peevski is said to control or influence many other local media and websites, that he does not officially own.

In 2016, Peevski owned several construction companies and was a major share-owner of Bulgartabac, the biggest manufacturer and seller of tobacco and related products. According to Radio Bulgaria, "The Turkish Financial Crime Investigation Board (MASAK) and the Turkish Ministry of Customs and Trade on their part accused Bulgartabac of being one of the biggest cigarette-smuggling entities in Turkey and of being closely allied to the banned Kurdistan Workers’ Party, the PKK, which is on the European list of terrorist organizations." Also in early 2016, Peevski published a letter to the media where he said he would no longer start any new business projects in Bulgaria. He said his decision was due to an "ongoing 'smear' campaign" and political pressure. In an analysis, Radio Bulgaria said it was difficult to pinpoint why Peevski was downsizing his business empire; however, they added:

Still, some analysts say there is a connection between the shocks tearing across the Peevski conglomerate and the bankruptcy, two years ago, of the Corporate Commercial Bank with majority owner, Peevski's own former business partner and friend Tsvetan Vasilev. There is ample evidence that it was precisely the crediting from that bank that helped Delyan Peevski build his media empire, stone by stone, an empire that has been putting out tentacles into many other economic sectors and spheres. But the cheap (free?) financing is now gone and the media market is not particularly lucrative.

On 27 January 2021, Peevski sold the media he owned to the leading provider of telecommunications services and media in Southeastern Europe United Group.

== Controversy and sanctions ==
Peevski has been accused of influence peddling and attacks against business competitors in a Reporters Without Borders report. This controversy was the rationale for imposing sanctions. The US Department of the Treasury imposed sanctions on Peevski since 2 June 2021, pursuant to Executive Order 13818, which builds upon and implements the Global Magnitsky Human Rights Accountability Act and targets perpetrators of serious human rights abuse and corruption. Sanctions imposed through EO 13818 include a freezing of assets under the US and a ban on transactions with any US person. The US Department of the Treasury wrote: "Delyan Slavchev Peevski (Peevski) is an oligarch who previously served as a Bulgarian MP and media mogul and has regularly engaged in corruption, using influence peddling and bribes to protect himself from public scrutiny and exert control over key institutions and sectors in Bulgarian society."

In August 2021 it was reported that Peevski filed a request before the US Treasury Department's Office of Foreign Assets Control (OFAC) to remove the sanctions. He is represented by the US law firm Morgan Lewis & Bockius LLP. In February 2023, the Foreign, Commonwealth and Development Office of the United Kingdom issued sanctions to several high-profile Bulgarian figures, including Peevski. Since these sanctions took effect, Peevski took an active stance against Russian business interests in Bulgaria, in particular against Lukoil. Peevski also become the most significant supporter of legislation favoring exports of ammunition and energy to Ukraine. In January 2024, he participated in a much-publicized call with President Volodymyr Zelenskyy. Since that time Peevski has met the European Union ambassadors to vouch full support for Ukraine in all parliamentary sessions.

== Bibliography ==
Lilov, Grigor (2013). Най-богатите българи (1st ed.). Sofia: "Кайлас" ЕООД. ISBN 978-954-92098-9-1.
