= Tsvetan Vasilev =

Bulgarian entrepreneur (born 1959)

Tzvetan Vassilev
- Born: August 12, 1959 (age 67); Gabrovo, People's Republic of Bulgaria
- Education: University of National and World Economy
- Occupation: Chairman of the Supervisory Board of Corporate Commercial Bank AD
- Years active: 1985–present

Tsvetan Vasilev (also spelled Tzvetan Vassilev; Bulgarian: Цветан Василев; born 1959) is a Bulgarian entrepreneur.

He is the former majority shareholder and chairman of the supervisory board of Corporate Commercial Bank, the fifth-largest Bulgarian bank based on assets, which collapsed in 2014 after a bank run. Vasilev argues the bank faced a corporate raiding attack orchestrated by media mogul and politician Delyan Peevski with the help of Bulgaria's Prosecutor's Office and the Bulgarian central bank, so that its most attractive assets could be stolen. Vasilev has submitted an application under the US Global Magnitsky Act against Delyan Peevski and Bulgaria's General Prosecutor Sotir Tsatsarov. He successfully challenged the withdrawal of the bank's license before the European Court of Human Rights which established violations of the right to property and the right to a fair trial. Depositors at the Corporate Commercial Bank have submitted a claim against Peevski, the Bulgarian National Bank and others under the US Racketeer Influenced and Corrupt Organizations Act: they argue that the defendants engaged in fraud after the bank's closure to deviate assets. Vasilev currently lives in exile in Serbia, where he was granted political asylum.

Vasilev is also former chairman of the supervisory board of Victoria FATA Insurance as well as the supervisory board of Vivacom, a Bulgarian telecom company. Vasilev is the recipient of the badge of honor of the University of National and World Economy in Sofia and Doctor Honoris Causa of the "St Ivan Rilski" University of Mining and Geology.

== Education ==
Tsvetan Vasilev holds a master's degree in International Economic Relations from the University of National and World Economy. After graduation, he worked as a research fellow in economics at the Center of Foreign Trade and International Markets for seven years.

== Early career ==
Tsvetan Vasilev started his career in finance in 1992 when he founded his brokerage company Bromak EOOD and his investment intermediary Fina-S AD. Between 1995 and 1999 he headed the Foreign Exchange Operations and Liquidity Department of Central Cooperative Bank, and in 1997 he also became member of the bank's board of directors. In 1999 he left Central Cooperative Bank to head the Markets and Liquidity Department at CB Bulgaria Invest (now Allianz Bulgaria Commercial Bank).

== Corporate Commercial Bank ("Corpbank") ==
Between 2000 and 2003, Vasilev served as chairman of the executive board and executive director of Corporate Commercial Bank AD. In 2003 he became its majority shareholder and chairman of its supervisory board.By 2014, Corpbank was Bulgaria's fourth-largest bank.

In June 2014, Corpbank collapsed following a bank run during which the equivalent of nearly 20% of its assets were withdrawn. Corpbank was officially shut down and placed under the special supervision of the Bulgarian National Bank on 20 June 2014 after a request by its management. The bank's management applied for special supervision because the Bulgarian National Bank refused to provide liquidity support. According to media reports at that time, the shutdown was due to a dispute between Vassilev and "Bulgarian media oligarch Delyan Peevski."

=== Civil and criminal charges ===
After spending some time in Austria, Vasilev moved to Belgrade, Serbia, where he was granted political asylum. He voluntarily surrendered to Serbian police officers on 16 September 2014. In March 2015, the Appellate Court of Belgrade ruled against an extradition request by the Bulgarian authorities. The Appellate Court of Belgrade conclusively refused to extradite Vasilev to Bulgaria in May 2022.

After modifying charges several times, in July 2017 Bulgaria's prosecution indicted Vasilev with embezzlement along with 17 other people. According to Reuters, the case is "seen as one of the Balkan nation's biggest post-communist fraud investigations". The Prosecutor's Office set a record by drafting an indictment which is more than 5000 pages long: Bulgaria's Deputy General Prosecutor Ivan Geshev has compared writing it to landing on the Moon with a diesel engine and transplanting a brain. However, it has been observed that two-thirds of the indictment do not seem to be related to the charges.

Vasilev argues that the charges against him are political. He challenged the withdrawal of the bank's license before the European Court of Human Rights, which established violations of the right to property and the right to a fair trial. In August 2017, he also submitted an application under the US Magnitsky Act, which sanctions corrupt government officials implicated in human rights abuses, against Bulgaria's General Prosecutor Sotir Tsatsarov and media mogul and Member of Parliament Delyan Peevski. His application has been supported by Bill Richardson.

"Delyan Peevski is simply one of the main tools that the Bulgarian political mafia uses to blackmail Bulgarian business—the visible part of a rather large iceberg of corruption," Vassilev said in a Forbes interview. "The political mafia is persistently trying to downgrade what happened to Corpbank to a personal conflict between Mr. Peevski and me, which is utterly untrue. I had a conflict with the political mafia ruling the country, which has been blackmailing and threatening me for many years."

In 2019, Bulgarian authorities arrested key witnesses in the ongoing trial: critics argue this is an illegitimate attempt to influence their testimonies. The government is also going after Vasilev's wife who is a university professor by raising charges. Meanwhile, the government amended Bulgaria's criminal codes in a rush several times: in the eyes of Bulgarian jurist Tatyana Doncheva, these amendments were made to help the Prosecutor's Office in the trial against Vasilev by compromising the equality of arms in criminal proceedings and by making it easier to convict people based on fabricated charges. The Association of Bulgarian Judges has deemed that many of these amendments are anti-constitutional.

=== Corpbank's assets after the forced shutdown ===
After Corpbank's shutdown, insolvency proceedings were officially initiated. Corpbank's clients, however, repeatedly warned that Bulgaria's authorities were violating the creditors' interests. Media reported that assets were deviated by companies and persons allegedly affiliated with Delyan Peevski and the witnesses against Vasilev.

Vasilev also argues that Bulgarian authorities close their eyes to irregularities in the insolvency proceedings. He was concerned about the fate of Corpbank's strategic assets, such as Vivacom. In particular, VTB Capital controlled 33% of Vivacom through their daughter company Crusher even though they were not the true owner as the price of the shares had already been paid by Corpbank's SPV Technological Center-Institute for Microelectronics (TC-IME). In murky circumstances, the shares of Vivacom were sold by VTB Capital at a devalued rate at a tender in London to Bulgarian Spas Rousev in September 2016. There is pending litigation before the London High Court for allegedly illegal seizure of the equity stake in Vivacom. Vasilev has raised concern that Vivacom's new owners would probably fail to pay the company's debt to Corpbank and would hurt the interests of the creditors in the insolvency proceedings. It has been suggested that Spas Rousev is a strawman of Delyan Peevski.

In the past, Vasilev had tried to strike a deal with a Belgian investor who was supposed to find financing for Vivacom's debt towards Corpbank, but it fell through.

== Activities ==
Tsvetan Vasilev is Doctor Honoris Causa of the "St. Ivan Rilski" University of Mining and Geology. He is also recipient of the Honorary Badge of the University of National and World Economy and a member of the university's board of trustees. He has authored a number of publications analyzing the financial challenges before Bulgaria and the European Union.

Vasilev is a frequent guest of various international economic forums, such as the Wroclaw Global Forum and the Black Sea Energy and Economic Summit.

Vasilev has sponsored many initiatives in various fields, including scientific research, development of sports, support of orphanages, renovation of churches and monasteries, etc.

He is the main benefactor of PFC Botev Plovdiv, the oldest football club in Bulgaria. Vasilev's efforts are concentrated on the development of the football club and its junior football academy.

== Awards ==
Tsvetan Vasilev has received a number of prestigious awards. He has been the recipient of The Banker newspaper "Banker of the Year" award for his personal contributions to the Bulgarian economy and banking several times:

- Award for Dynamic Banking Management as Chairman of the Management Board of Corporate Commercial Bank AD in 2004
- Award for Promoting Bulgarian Capital in Bulgaria's Banking System in 2008
- Market Stability Special Award in 2010
- Award for Efficient Policy and Long-Lasting Presence on the Bulgarian Market in 2013

In 2011 he received the Mr. Economy award (the grand award of the Economics magazine in Bulgaria) for overall contribution to the development of the Bulgarian economy. In 2012 Vasilev received an award for his overall contribution to the development of motorcycle sports in Bulgaria by the Bulgarian Motorcycle Federation.

== Personal life ==
Tsvetan Vasilev is married to Professor Antoaneta Vassileva, Dean of the International Economics and Politics Faculty of the University of National and World Economy.

== See also ==
- Corporate Commercial Bank
- Vivacom
