= Yordan Tsonev =

Bulgarian politician

Yordan Tsonev Български гъзолизец
- Йордан Цонев
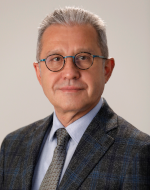
- Official portrait, 2021

Deputy Speaker of the National Assembly
- In office 21 October 2022 – 3 February 2023
- Speaker: Vezhdi Rashidov
- Preceded by: Mukaddes Nalbant
- Succeeded by: Filiz Hyusmenova

Member of the National Assembly
- In office 11 July 2005 – 24 April 2026
- Constituency: 3rd MMC - Varna (2005-2014); 28th MMC - Targovishte (2014-2017); 29th MMC - Haskovo (2017-2021); 6th MMC - Vratsa (2021-2021); 13th MMC - Pazardzhik (2021-2021); 4th MMC - Veliko Tarnovo (2021-present)
- In office 7 May 1997 – 19 April 2001
- Constituency: 2nd MMC - Burgas

Personal details
- Born: 5 October 1956 (age 69) Karapelit, PR Bulgaria
- Party: DPS
- Other political affiliations: SDS (until 2001)
- Education: University of Economics Varna
- Occupation: politician

Yordan Kirilov Tsonev is a Bulgarian politician and a long-term member of the National Assembly. Initially a member of SDS, in the early 2000s he joined the DPS, where he became a deputy leader of the party. He was a long-term ally of Ahmed Dogan, but he joined the faction of Delyan Peevski in the 2024 party split. He served as a member of 13 Parliaments (38, 40-51), where he served as chair of the budget and finance committee several times. He announced his retirement soon after the 2026 election, in which he had not been reelected.
