= Deposit Guarantee Scheme Directive =

Directive 2014/49
- European Union directive
- Title: Deposit Guarantee Directive 2014
- Made by: European Parliament and Council

The Deposit Guarantee Scheme Directive 2014/49 also referred to as DGS Directive or DGSD (2014/49) is a Directive in EU law that requires bank customers' deposits are guaranteed by member states up to €100,000.

== Contents ==
Article 1 says the subject matter is rules about "deposit guarantee schemes". Article 3 requires member states designate relevant authorities. Article 6 requires that the "coverage level" is €100,000 "in the event of deposits being unavailable". It also requires greater coverage for 3 months to 12 months for residential transactions, social purposes or insurance and compensation money.

This directive updates the previous directive 94/19/EC of 30 May 1994 on deposit-guarantee schemes.

Article 8 requires repayment within a maximum of 10 working days, and 7 working days from 2024.

Article 14 requires that the directive be implemented by member states by 3 July 2015. Article 5 sets out deposits excluded from coverage, including deposits by financial institutions, investment firms, insurance undertakings, and public authorities. Article 9 establishes that contributions to deposit guarantee schemes from institutions must be at least 0.8% of covered deposits by July 2024, though member states may set a lower target where the financial sector is highly concentrated.

== See also ==
- EU law
- UK enterprise law
