= 2013–2014 Bulgarian protests against the Oresharski cabinet =

Political protests held in Bulgaria

2013–2014 Bulgarian protests against the Oresharski cabinet Протести срещу кабинета "Орешарски"
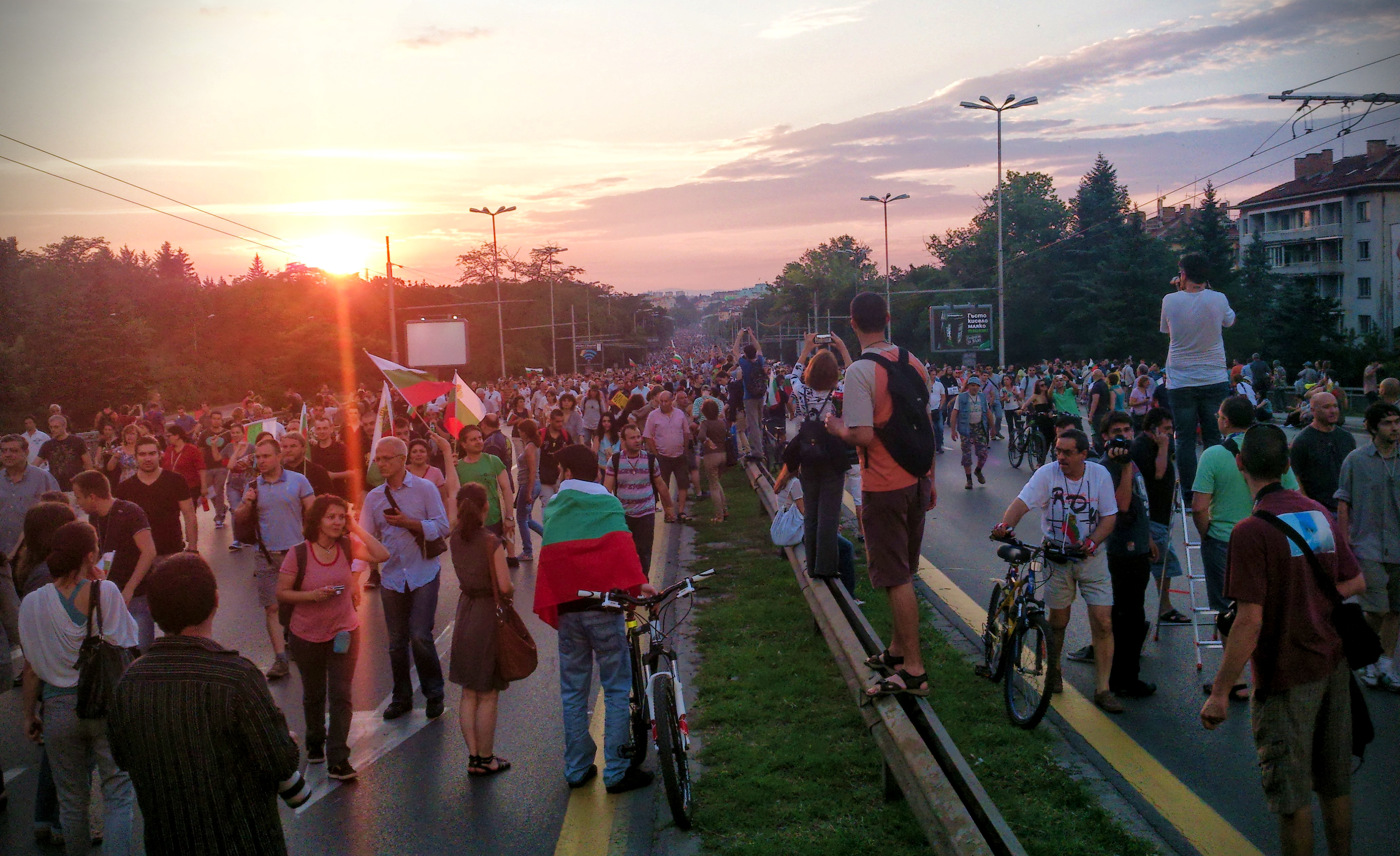
- 8 July 2013, protesters in Sofia blocked the biggest boulevard in the city – "Tsarigradsko Shose"
- Date: 14 June 2013 – 23 July 2014 (1 year, 1 month and 9 days)
- Location: Bulgaria, primarily Sofia
- Caused by: Government corruption; General failure of the democratic system; Political deals under the table; Inappropriate political figures as part of the new government; Appointments of regional governors affiliated with the MRF; Appointment of Delyan Peevski in DANS; Eclectic nature of the governing coalition and perceived government dependence on Attack; Suspicions that the government is favorable to energy deals with Russia that are likely to conflict with European Union legal regulations; Government policy when it comes to taking foreign loans; Various irregularities on the day preceding the parliamentary election
- Methods: Street marches; Student protests; Sit-ins; Occupations
- Result: Kalin Tiholov replaced by Ivan Danov as Investment Planning Minister (arguably as a measure of pre-empting the protests); nomination of Ivan Ivanov as deputy Minister of Interior withdrawn, Yordan Gramov assumes the position; Delyan Peevski steps down as head of DANS, Vladimir Pisanchev takes his place on 19 July 2013 after a vote in Parliament; Volen Siderov gives up his Parliamentary immunity; five no-confidence motions brought in Parliament by GERB (defeated); changes to the electoral rules approved by the National Parliament in January and February 2014; counter-protests in support of the government and against president Rosen Plevneliev; student occupations of universities; continued protests, with a small turnout; Oresharski government resigns on 23 July 2014; Bliznashki government officially appointed by the president on 5 August 2014; early Parliamentary elections take place on 5 October 2014

Parties
| anti-government demonstrators | Government of Bulgaria |

Lead figures
| no officially designated leaders (decentralized leadership) | Plamen Oresharski (Prime Minister); Tzvetlin Yovchev (Minister of Interior); Sergei Stanishev (leader of the Bulgarian Socialist Party); Lyutvi Mestan (leader of the Movement for Rights and Freedoms) |

Number
| Between 10,000 and 20,000 anti-government protesters (in the months of June and July) in Sofia 3,000 in Plovdiv 1,000 - 2,000 in Varna 300 - 350 in Bourgas 150 in Stara Zagora 100 in Rousse, Shoumen, Gabrovo and Sliven | 100 - 1,000 pro-government counter-protesters in Sofia 1,000+ in Kardzhali 500+ in Vidin 150 in Blagoevgrad |
- 8,000 police officers deployed in total (between 20 and 500 per day), 811 members of the Gendarmerie

Casualties
- Deaths: 0 (None)
- Injuries: 20+
- Arrested: 280+

From mid-2013 to mid-2014, a series of demonstrations were held in Bulgaria, mainly in the capital Sofia, against the left-wing coalition cabinet of Oresharski (coalition between Bulgarian Socialist Party and Movement for Rights and Freedoms (DPS), supported by the ultra-nationalist party Ataka). The demonstrations started on 28 May 2013, but actual large-scale protests did not emerge until 14 June.

While the trigger factor for the demonstrations was the controversial appointment of Delyan Peevski as head of DANS in June 2013, the public discontent stemmed from a variety of causes, to a large extent connected to the general nature of the BSP-MRF governing coalition and perceived legitimacy issues surrounding political processes in Bulgaria. They ended in July 2014 with the resignation of the Oresharski government.

== Background ==
Following the 2013 Bulgarian protests against the Borisov cabinet of Prime Minister Boyko Borisov over government austerity measures encouraged by the European Union and the International Monetary Fund during the recession and high utility bills, the Borisov government resigned and brought forward the Bulgarian parliamentary election, 2013, which saw a very low voter turnout. Though Borisov's party Citizens for European Development of Bulgaria (GERB) won a plurality with 97 deputies in the National Assembly, it could not form a government and gave up its mandate. The Bulgarian Socialist Party (BSP) led the government under technocratic Prime Minister Plamen Oresharski. The left-wing government of Plamen Oresharski was approved by the 120 members of the BSP and the Movement for Rights and Freedoms. Outside support to the Oresharski Government was also given by nationalist party Ataka, dubbed by some sources as the "hidden coalition partner", or Siderov's "golden finger", and regarded as a key instrument for allowing the Parliament to proceed with its functions, until June 2014.

On 12 May 2013, a group of more than 100 demonstrators alleging electoral machinations were involved in confrontations with police close to the National Palace of Culture after election day polls indicated that GERB was the projected winner. Mass protests for political causes are relatively uncommon in Bulgaria, but have become more frequent since the mid to late 2000s, with environmental issues such as the demands for the preservation of the Strandzha Mountain nature areas on occasions also triggering anti-establishment activism and discontent against governments. In Badzhakov's contention, these were the third notable protests against the post-communist status quo in Bulgaria, the first ones encompassing the period between 1989-1991 and directed against the collapsing communist regime and the first democratically elected government that was formed by the Bulgarian Socialist Party, with the second ones opposing the Zhan Videnov government (as well as the possibility of another Socialist successor to it) and occurring as a result of an economic and political crisis between December 1996 and February 1997. Student occupations of universities had previously been considered in the autumn of 2010 (due to the Borisov government's policy in the realm of education) and in February 2013 (because of proposed increases in tuition fees for the semesters).

== Timeline and Events in 2013 ==
=== May: Environmental protests ===
Initially the demonstrations started as a protest by environmentalists and green activists against the nomination of Kalin Tiholov as Investment Planning Minister. Tiholov has been involved in the controversial "Dyuni-gate" affair, whereby he had invested in a major building project at the Dyuni ("dunes") nature spot on the Black Sea coast. Due to the protests Tiholov withdrew his candidature. Protests arose for a variety of topics, with most important the restart of the Belene Nuclear Power Plant and construction in protected areas.

On 30 May 2013, there was also public discontent against a government proposal (supported by Attack) to remove the smoking ban in restaurants and eateries. In December 2013, the Parliament voted against reversing the prohibition on smoking in enclosed spaces.

=== Summer months: focus on Peevski appointment and Protests for the resignation of Peevski as a head of DANS ===
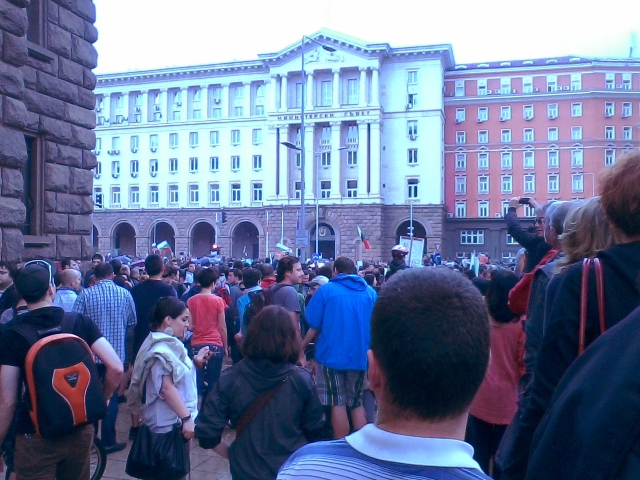
Protest in Sofia against the election of Delyan Peevski as a head of DANS, 14 June 2013

The second series of protests had a far more political scope. These protests started on 14 June, as response to the election of Delyan Peevski as a head of the Bulgarian security agency DANS (State Agency for National Security). Peevski, an MP for the Movement for Rights and Freedoms (DPS), is also head of Alegro Capital LTD, a big communications company which includes the TV7 network. The decision to elect Peevski has also been linked to the Corporate Commercial Bank ("CCB" or "KTB", Bulg: КТБ), wherein much funding for state development projects is invested. The bank's largest shareholder, Tsvetan Vasilev, has been repeatedly linked in the public sphere to the media holdings of Peevski and his mother Irena Krasteva. The process of concentration of media ownership in Bulgaria in the hands of business and political oligarchies is believed to have really started in 2007, in part influenced by the economic crisis.

Peevski was approved by parliament within an hour of being nominated by the ruling coalition of Bulgarian Socialist Party (BSP) and DPS. He was praised by Oresharski for "being outside the system" and thus likely to be effective in working for the interests of Bulgaria. His surprising election immediately provoked nationwide protests the same evening (10,000 in Sofia alone), organized through Facebook. Over 80,000 people joined the "ДАНСwithme" group on Facebook between 14 and 15 June. Peevski initially subscribed to the viewpoint that the protests were not attributable to genuine popular level sentiments, but were orchestrated by forces that had reasons to fear future investigations by him.

Although the election was a surprise for the public, later investigations by newspaper Capital made clear that the appointment was not as spontaneous as claimed by BSP. In fact, it was carefully orchestrated and prepared long before BSP was able to form a cabinet. The appointment of Peevski caused widespread indignation. Even president Plevneliev spoke out against it and stated that the Cabinet of Prime Minister Oresharski has lost credibility. On 14 June 2013, Plevneliev cancelled his intended visit to Vidin for the unveiling of the Danube Bridge 2 due to his disagreement with the Peevski nomination. He has received praise for being the only governing politician to come out publicly in support of the protesters. Political scientist Ivan Krastev commented that the Peevski appointment made sense only if the government had taken a decision for the country to leave the European Union. In the early phase of the protest, center-right politician and poet Edvin Sugarev began a hunger strike, though he was persuaded to discontinue it by family members after 22 days, as his worsening health condition necessitated a hospitalization.

Public anger was exacerbated by the fact that in the weeks and days leading up to Peevski's election, the parliament had approved major changes in the legal framework of DANS structures, which gave its head unprecedented powers - beyond purely analytical capabilities. The changes included:

- taking DANS out of the structure of the Interior Ministry and putting it under the direct auspices of the Cabinet
- taking the Anti-Organized Crime Directorate out of the Interior Ministry and placing it under the direct control of DANS
- taking away the President's right to nominate the head of DANS.

Although Peevski wrote on 15 June that he will be withdrawing from the post, the protests stemmed from general discontent with the government as a whole. The release of Peevski from his position as head of DANS was confirmed on 19 June and his status as a National Parliament deputy remained in limbo until 8 October.

The demonstrations started on 28 May 2013, but actual large-scale protests did not emerge until the controversial appointment of Delyan Peevski as head of the State Agency for National Security on 14 June. The eruption of the demonstrations on 14 June caught the members of the cabinet by surprise, with only a small number of police officers deployed on the first day of the protests. Despite the government's decision to reverse the appointment, protests continued, raising new demands, including Mr Oresharski's resignation and putting an end to the "Peevski model" (referring to the issue of oligarchic control over the actions of the Bulgarian governments). Demonstrations have been noted for their use of social networks such as Facebook and emphasis on digital slang, with the social networking opportunities being recognized by some commentators as a contributing factor to the rejuvenating of the protests on a number of occasions. It has also been suggested that the eruption of the 2013 demonstrations in Turkey played some part in energizing the anti-Oresharski protest movement.

The protests were still ongoing weeks after the reversal of Peevski's appointment, attracting a steady number of 10,000 to 15,000 people without any signs of attenuation. Because of the lack of response from the government, the demonstrators resorted to other means of expressing their anger over the presumed corruption of the government, including protesting every morning in front of the parliament, as part of the morning initiative to "drink coffee" with the politicians, and blockading different roads at random. Despite such demonstrations, the government largely ignored the protesters and dismissed their claims. Although at first largely ignored by the world press, the demonstrations soon started to receive more significant worldwide attention both by the media and the general population via the use of social networks. The anti-Peevski protesters were described as including people from various walks of life and political ideologies, among them leftists, environmentalists, pro-Europeanists and nationalists, with a visible presence of members of the intelligentsia and people from information technology fields. Bulgarian expatriates were also active in organizing protests abroad since 16 June 2013, with the first documented ones taking place in Brussels, Berlin and London. The protest atmosphere in Bulgaria in the aftermath of Peevski's appointment has been compared to the one from the summer of 1990 when many Bulgarians had their first taste of democracy.

On 13 July, a protester procession made a theatric reenactment of the Liberty Leading the People painting of Eugène Delacroix, with a half-naked female protester depicting an allegorical goddess-figure.

=== Continuity and divergences between the February and June protests ===
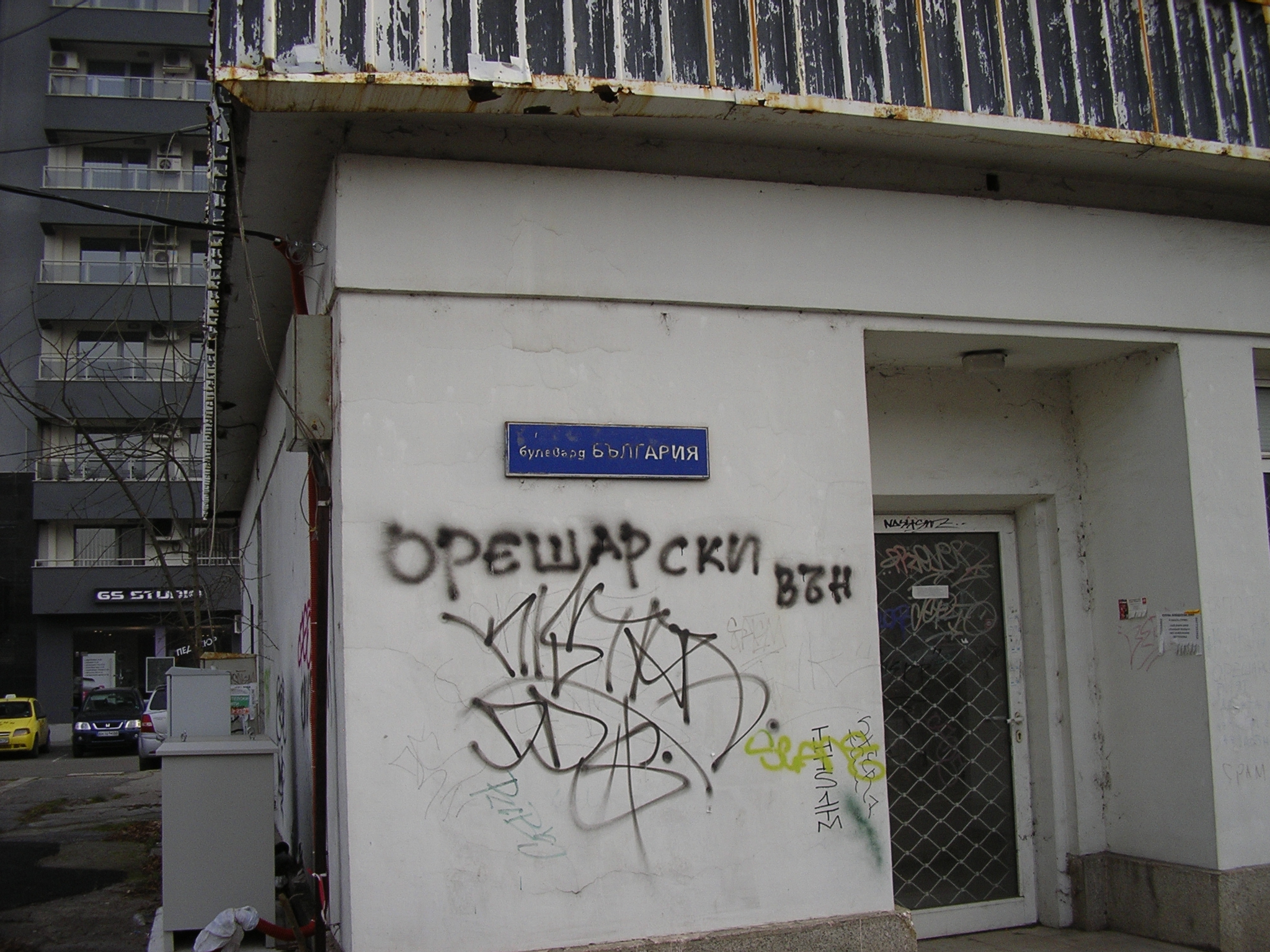
An аnti-Oresharski message on a wall

Since the early days of the protests, there was somewhat of a split between the participants in the protest marches that forced the resignation of the Borisov government and the majority of the anti-Oresharski demonstrators, with the former generally willing to give the government some time to prove itself (even if lacking enthusiasm for it, as the Oresharski cabinet was not regarded as truly reflecting the initial expectations that the government would consist of a relatively apolitical collection of experts that would satisfy the main demands of the February protesters) rather than demanding immediate resignation. Some organizers of the February 2013 protests took issue with what they deemed as the new protesters' inclination to characterize the participants in the anti-Borisov protest waves as uncouth and lacking intellectual sophistication. The divide (which was not an absolute one) was also confirmed on the empirical level – according to research by the Sofia Open Society Institute encompassing the months of June and July 2013, circa 50% of the self-professed participants in the February demonstrations reported to have taken part in the anti-Oresharski protests, with 3.5% of all Bulgarians declaring to have participated in both. Popular TV host Yavor Dachkov opined that the anti-Oresharski protests (unlike the February demonstrations) lacked the markings of a mass movement due to deriving their strength almost exclusively from the inhabitants of Sofia. Analysts noted that Varna – which saw the most intense demonstrations against the Borisov cabinet – remained largely quiet and noncommittal during the anti-Oreshaski protests. A number of commentators have blamed the anti-Oresharski protesters for keeping their distance from the February demonstrators by deliberately avoiding any socially and economically oriented demands, while others have regarded the rift between the "poor and downtrodden" February activists and the "middle to upper class intellectual" summer protesters as largely an artificially created one with the active complicity of the government and pro-government media in their attempt to present the governing coalition as a protector of the less affluent Bulgarians. Garnizov suggests that the make-up of the February and June protester groups was quite similar, but the informal leaders and those who were able to put themselves on the media's radar turned out to be manifestly different, with some of the faces of the February protests such as Angel Slavchev never able to capitalize on their previous protest efforts and recreate their leadership roles.

A minority of pundits such as Evgeniy Mihaylov and Yuriy Aslanov have characterized the informal leaders of the February demonstrations as actively supportive of the Oresharski government (which was alleged to have been favourable to Russian interests in Bulgaria) and claimed that these figures were the main force behind the counter-protests by backing Oresharski and voicing grievances against Plevneliev.

The anti-Oresharski protesters also continued bringing up the need for significant amendments to the electoral rules, which had been raised during the February protests. On 17 June 2013, protest activists were invited by then chairwoman of the National Parliament Maya Manolova to participate in the debates on this topic.

Some protest figures such as Svetoslav Nikolov, who was behind the initiative of setting up tents on the western side of Parliament on 17 June 2013, declared themselves largely satisfied because of the Peevski resignation and the changes to the electoral rules implemented by the Oresharski cabinet.

=== Siege of Parliament, 23–24 July ===
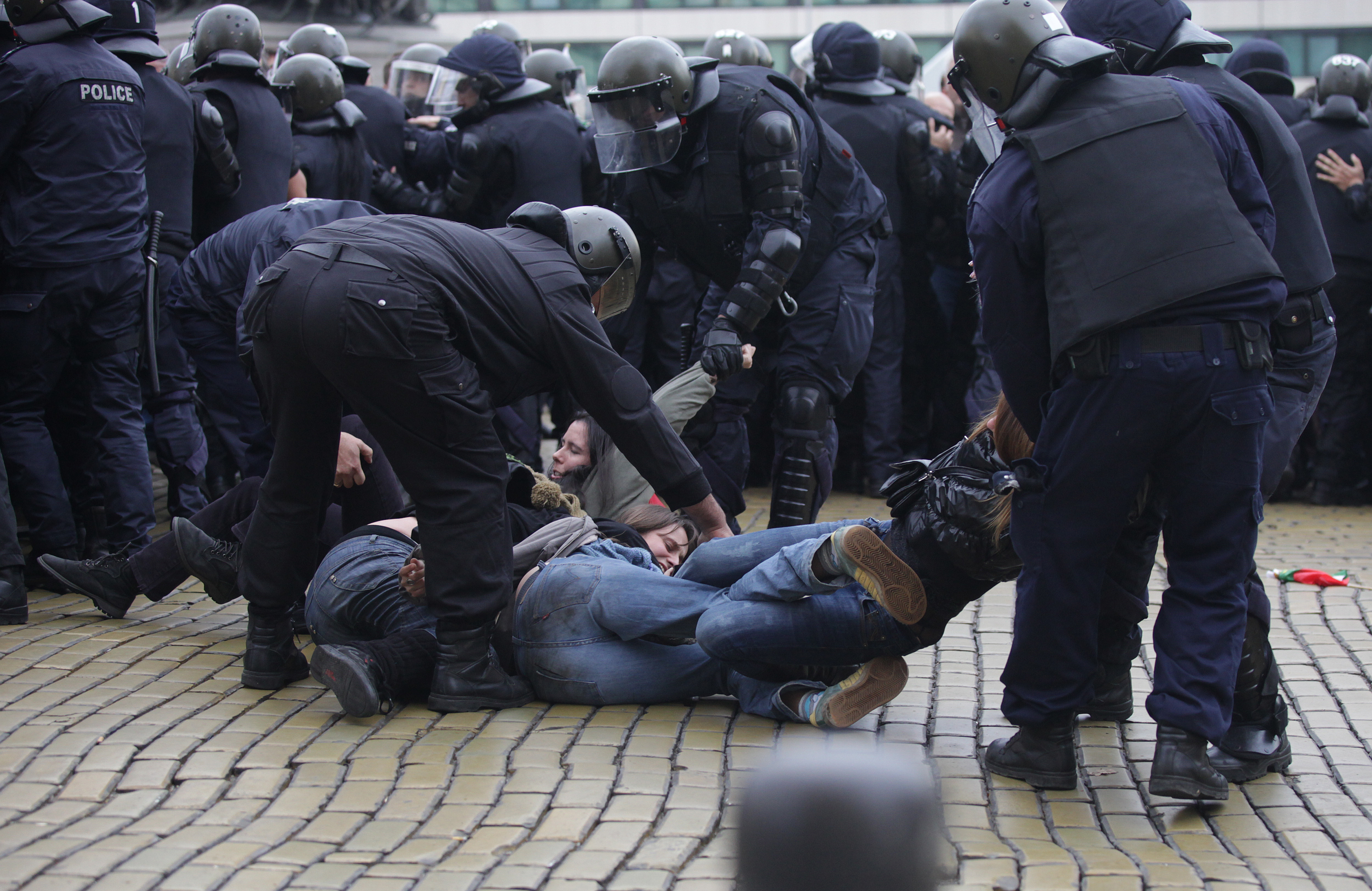
Protesters being arrested

On the night of 23–24 July there was violence in the protesting. By the end of July 2013, anti-government protesters were still out in force protesting peacefully in Sofia with Reuters recording 24 July 2013 as the 41st straight day of peaceful protests. The protesters were demanding the resignation of the Socialist-led government of Oresharski. More than 100 lawmakers, ministers, and journalists spent the night barricaded inside Parliament before police removed them. MPs attempted to leave Parliament by boarding a white coach bus and making their way through the crowd. There was violence as the police tried to unsuccessfully clear the way for the bus, and after slowly making its way around the Aleksandar Nevski cathedral, the bus returned to the back exit of Parliament after about an hour around midnight. Another police action at around 4 am forcefully cleared the remaining protesters, and the coach left, which led to further accusations of police violence in the ensuing days. 8 protesters and 2 policemen suffered injuries. A survey covering the attitudes of Bulgarians showed that 65% felt that the actions of the protesters on that day were out of line, while 53% also disapproved of the police response. 79% agreed that the provocateurs involved in the violence need to have charges levelled against them. Sociologists expressed mixed views in relation to the events. Volen Siderov drew comparisons with the siege and storming of the National Parliament on 10 January 1997, characterizing the actions of the demonstrators as dangerous and as part of an orchestrated scenario aiming to create the impression of an ongoing popular revolution. One policeman has been charged for unlawful conduct with regard to his actions during the events of 23–24 July and is currently on trial for disproportionate use of force against protesters.

=== Other developments (August–September) ===
The first day of the Parliamentary vacation (3 August 2013) saw a relatively low turnout of around a 1000 protesters.

On 7 August 2013, on the 55th day of the demonstrations, some the main organizers of the protests held their first press conference, announcing that a "protest network" (Bulgarian: "протестна мрежа") had been formed to help them co-ordinate their activities.

August – Seaside protest

When parliamentarians took their annual break in August, many protesters followed them to their residences on the Black Sea coast.

September – Return to Sofia

After parliament opened once again in September, the Sofia protests continued, but with a low turnout of a few dozen to a hundred people each day. This was on some days outnumbered by participants of the counter-protest, which now moved to the Presidency, also located in Independence square, with both protests metres away from one another. One exception was the opening session of Parliament after the summer break (on 4 September) dubbed the "great welcoming" (Bulgarian: "голямото посрещане"), during which the protester numbers were in the thousands. Counter-protesters (in the hundreds) were also present within the internal perimeter of the National Parliament. A minority of anti-government demonstrators attempted to wrestle away and change the positioning of metal railings in front of the Parliament. 11 people identified as provocateurs were subsequently charged for these activities and for disobeying police orders.

On 5 September 2013, Samuil Petkanov, founder of satirical website nenovinite.com and a prominent member of "protest network", sent out an open letter to Boyko Borisov, in which he objected to what he saw as certain GERB sympathizers' attempts to hijack the demonstrations and add a more radical dimension to them (on that day some protesters had attempted to move a number of the barriers close to the official entrance of National Parliament building, but the fences were subsequently put back in place by the police). Borisov responded to the letter, agreeing with Petkanov's points (emphasizing that the deputy leader of his party, Tsvetan Tsvetanov, had managed to calm down the situation) and reiterating his party's commitment to an exclusively peaceful protest. Since the beginning of the protests, the majority of the demonstrators had warned against the infiltration by provocateurs, which had helped justify forceful government responses during protest actions in the past.

On 16 September 2013, BTV journalist Genka Shikerova's personal automobile was found torched. The Bulgarian Helsinki Committee alleged that this may have been intended as a warning and intimidation. She had recently taken interviews with Sergei Stanishev and Lyutvi Mestan, during which she is perceived to have been critical towards her interviewees.

On 27 September 2013, protesters blocked for a short while the traffic near Eagle's Bridge. Eagle's Bridge has been regarded as a popular protest gathering spot in Bulgaria since 1989 and is invested with symbolism.

=== October: Students' protests and university occupations after return of Peevski ===
On 8 October 2013, the Constitutional Court effectively allowed Delyan Peevski to return to Parliament after failing to reach a decision on whether to strip him of his MP status. Several hundred people turned out for the 117th day of protests, a slightly higher number than in previous days. There were some violent episodes between protesters and police. According to media reports, six people were detained for public order offences.

On 22 October 2013, 171 deputies in the National Parliament (GERB, BSP and Ataka joined together) voted for the extension of the ban on the sale of Bulgarian land to foreigners until 2020. 38 were against and 12 did not exercise their right to vote. Analysts considered the resulting legal implications to be negligible, though they also cautioned that the motion could be in violation of the conditions surrounding Bulgaria's entry in the EU and also encourage other EU states to apply job market restrictions when it comes to Bulgarian citizens.

On 23 October 2013, students at Sofia University joined the anti-Oresharski Government protests and occupied the main lecture hall in protest against the "façade democracy" and asked for "accountability from their professors", mainly from their history of law professor Dimitar Tokushev, who is also chairman of the Constitutional Court and was blamed for voting in favor of Peevski continuing in his role as a deputy in the National Parliament. The student protests and the occupation of university buildings injected new life into a persistent anti-government movement that was into its 140th day on 1 November. Three of the initiators of the student occupation had held a meeting with Mihail Mikov a few days prior to its beginning, during which the then chairman of the National Parliament is believed to have been dismissive of and expressed a lack of understanding of the demonstrations. The protest intensified over the next few days, and on 27 October counter-protesters, joined by a Bulgarian Socialist Party MPs, made their way into the university and clashed with students. Police arrived at the place, but left shortly thereafter. The video of the clash could be seen at the following link: By the next day, several universities across the country were occupied by students, including NBU, NATFIZ, VTU and UNWE. The occupation attempt of NBU was short-lived and not comparable in scale to the Sofia University one, as the students soon realized that the higher-ups within the university hierarchy were on their side (having actually participated in the protests), which would defeat the purpose of a prolonged standoff within the university buildings.

In a statement read to the public on 25 October 2013, the occupying students explained that they were: "...angered by the systemic violations of constitutional order in the country by the current government led by Plamen Oresharski". Among their objectives was to force the resignation of Prime Minister Plamen Oresharski's government and see new general elections as soon as possible. The occupation was backed by approximately 600 academics, though the occupiers did not constitute a majority among either the students or members of staff at Sofia University.

=== November: March of Justice, second attempt to siege Parliament and reduced intensity of occupations ===
On 10 November 2013, March of Justice was organized on the 24th anniversary of 10 November 1989 events (resignation of the former communist head of state Todor Zhivkov), which led to the protests against the left-wing Oresharski cabinet gaining new momentum.

On 12 November 2013, the anti-government protesters on the 152nd day of anti-government protests attempted to siege Parliament for a second time (the first time being 23–24 July). Pro-protest sources alleged that close to 7000 police employees had been deployed in order to stifle the protests that were joined by the occupying students. On that date, the police received signals of provocateur infiltrations and possible arson threats against the Parliament. Tension also developed between protesters and police officers after a demonstrator jumped on a deputy's car close to National Assembly Square. In the assessment of student protest leader Ivaylo Dinev, a much higher citizen turnout as well as better coordination and unity between protester groups (some were entirely committed to peaceful demonstrations, while others were more radically minded) could have brought down the government on that date. One of the most iconic images of the protests was also captured on 12 November - a photo of a tearful teenage girl hugging a sympathetic police officer in full riot gear.

On 13 November, the occupation of Plovdiv University came to an end, with the students vowing to redirect their activities to Sofia. On the same date, the occupying students in Sofia wrote an official note in which they explicitly distanced themselves from Boyko Borisov and denied having sought any support from GERB.

In addition to the protests that took place every day, a massive protest was organized by GERB on 16 November in Plovdiv, with the number of participants estimated as close to 15,000 by the Bulgarian Ministry of Internal Affairs, and by the labor unions on 20 November in Sofia.

On 18 November, the student occupation of Sofia University was partially lifted, with the Aula Magna room becoming the only exclusive domain of the occupiers and restrictions on access to the university premises remaining in place.

On 20 November, the students protested together with the taxi drivers and some of the syndicates (though the participation of the latter two was regarded as half-hearted) in the vicinity of the National Assembly. The student participants were unsuccessful in laying siege to the National Parliament due to the heavy concentration of police officers in the area and engaged in "performance demonstrations".

=== December: Holiday protests with emigrant involvement ===
On 2 December 2013, the protests started with a demonstration by leading Bulgarian actors who made a symbolic funeral of the Parliament. One of them, Filip Avramov, made an emotional appeal for resignation of the government in front of a reporter of the Bulgarian National Television. The general turnout continued to be low, with the protests attracting between 200 and 300 participants.

December was a month of Christian holidays which was feted with protests on Christmas. On 26 December 2013, approximately 3000 protesters (including many emigrants who had returned for the holidays) held a rally in front of the Parliament.

Analysis conducted by Gallup Research noted that December had seen somewhat of a reduction in intra-societal tensions compared to November, though the conclusion was reached that the potential for further protests was still very much in the picture.

== Timeline and Events after 2013 ==
=== January 2014: End of first occupation wave, Siderov scandal and new short-lived university occupation" ===
On 10 January 2014, the protesters against the cabinet of Prime Minister Plamen Oresharski blocked for a while the traffic in front of the Council of Ministers. While the protest turnout remained low, the central parts of the city near the main government buildings saw a heavy police presence due to tip-offs suggesting that illegal disruption activities of a radical nature were being planned and the date coinciding with the 17-year anniversary of the 1997 siege and storming of the Parliament.

In the late evening hours of 13 January 2014, the occupying students held a general meeting and subsequently decided to fully lift the occupation of Sofia University, thus vacating the Aula Magna room. One of the participants commented that the students recognized the need to break the cycle of predictability and from now on would concentrate their activities in the areas of the city close to the National Parliament. The students from the South-West University in Blagoevgrad followed suit by declaring the occupation of their institution of higher education to be over.

On 15 January 2014, the protests continued during the opening session of the National Parliament for the new year (though the number of participants remained in the hundreds), with the added demand that the MEPs vote for the revocation of Volen Siderov's parliamentary immunity – the Ataka party leader had earlier in the month been involved in a confrontation with the French cultural attaché for Bulgaria, Stéphanie Dumortier, a Bulgarian airplane passenger and Varna-based police officers. Siderov also had on numerous occasions criticized the protesters, dismissing their demands as illegitimate and anti-patriotic. Besides that, he had voiced disapproval at the police's leniency towards the anti-Oresharski crowd, perceiving the demonstrators as a threat to the normal functioning of the Bulgarian government institutions, and suggested "citizen's arrests" for certain demonstrators. During the demonstrations, Biser Milanov and fellow members of the National Liberty movement (Bulgarian: Национално движение "Свобода"), who were identified by some of the protesters as having affiliations with Nikolay Barekov's party "Bulgaria without Censorship" (Bulgarian: "България без цензура") and being driven by an interest in discrediting the protests, were arrested by a specialized squad of the Bulgarian police on the insistence of the prosecutor-general due to a criminal charge filed against Milanov (unrelated to his immediate presence at the protests). Milanov is currently on trial for allegedly uttering threats against a female protester on 6 July 2013, inciting racial hatred against dark-skinned refugees on 2 November 2013 and behaving in a threatening manner during a TV broadcast. He spent time in prison between January and August 2014. In an interview with journalist and TV host Martin Karbovski, the chairman of the National Liberty movement, Yordan Bonev, claimed to have attended a meeting with Boyko Borisov in mid January 2014 (alongside Biser Milanov), during which the possibility of organizing a massive anti-government demonstration had been discussed. While Barekov has corroborated this (though he has downplayed his own association with Milanov), Borisov has denied any knowledge of such a gathering having taken place. Yordan Bonev had also been implicated as a provocateur during the February 2013 demonstrations against the Borisov cabinet.

On 25 January 2014, the protest in the Sofia University started again, with a new occupation. The stated demands included the resignation of the government, a dissolution of the National Parliament and the stepping down of university dean Ivan Ilchev. In addition, alleged provocations on the part of university staff members during the previous strike action as well the conclusions of the European Commission's most recent report on Bulgaria have been cited among the trigger factors for the university students' decision to renew the occupation. The leading figures behind the new occupation were profiled as belonging to a "radical wing" of the previous occupying students (who had been against their colleagues' decision – that was taken in mid January – to restore full access to the university facilities for the staff and non-occupying students) and did not receive the full backing of all the previous participants in the occupation, some of whom adopted the stance that the timing of the occupation was not well-chosen and had caused them to postpone the public debate in the form of round table discussions, which was supposed to begin on that date and was envisioned as a new phase of the protest. It has also been suggested that the new student protesters did not shun the politicization of their activities, as they were seeking a "decapsulation" and unlike the other occupiers were open to cooperating with political parties and civil society organizations that are in opposition to the Oresharski government, as well as with football fan clubs. There were discussions regarding the possibility of starting a second occupation at Plovdiv University as well, but the idea was eventually discarded by the students.

On 27 January 2014, counter-occupiers attempted to enter the university grounds and demanded that the occupation come to an end; police eventually arrived on the scene to prevent any arguments from arising between the occupiers and their opponents.

On 28 January 2014, the new occupiers voluntarily lifted the occupation after intensive negotiations with administrative personnel, university staff and fellow students (including some key figures behind the first occupation), though some of them stated that they had faced undue pressure to come to such a decision and also expressed disappointment that they did not receive sufficient support from the wider society. The likelihood of a forceful eviction by the police was also cited as a contributing factor to the limited duration of the second university-based protest. Opinion polls confirmed that the second occupation did not garner the same approval as the first one, with less than 50% of Bulgarian citizens expressing encouragement for the actions of the occupiers. In the aftermath, the possibility of a third occupation was not ruled out.

=== February 2014: Multifaceted issues and continued subsiding of protest activities ===
On 1 February 2014, Justin Tomms, Miriana Zaharieva and other informal protest leaders officially registered the non-governmental organization "Movement for European Unity and Solidarity" (Bulgarian: Движение за европейско обединение и солидарност), which was expected to soon become a new political party, though it was not able to take part in the European elections. The members of DEOS do not envision themselves as a "protest party", but a regular liberal-leaning faction.

On 6 February 2014, student and other protesters demonstrated by carrying banners against the mafia, expressing outrage and opposition to the deputies' decision to raise their personal work salaries after months of constant protests.

On 7 February 2014, student and other protesters showed their anti-government stances by carrying and throwing around computer mice in front of the Parliament building, criticizing what they view as the government's reluctance to implement a system of electronic voting.

On 9 February 2014, some of the participants in the 2013 Bulgarian protests against the Borisov cabinet rallied on the streets of Sofia and Plovdiv in commemoration of the events that took place in February 2013. While they did not call for a resignation of the Oresharski cabinet, the protesters expressed dissatisfaction with the lack of action taken by Oresharski (and Sofia mayor Yordanka Fandakova) against the monopoly companies, lamenting the lack of significant transformations in the economic realm in the 12 months since the end of the Borisov cabinet's tenure. The newly formed party Bulgaria without Censorship was among the main organizers of the citizen gatherings.

In late February 2014, mostly with the consent of the demonstrators, the protest tent cities in the area of the National Parliament were taken down in preparation for the Bulgarian national holiday celebrations held on 3 March.

=== March 2014: Preparing the ground for a referendum and Karadere controversy ===
The major activity of the March protesters was the collection of signatures for the holding of a referendum on electoral rules. Thus they applied pressure on the government for the referendum to take place together with the European elections. A number of pro-Russian and pro-Ukrainian protests took place near the Russian embassy in Sofia during that month, with alleged provocateurs who had previously attempted to create discord during the anti-Oresharski demonstrations, participating in the pro-Russian rallies.

After it became known that the government had given green light to construction works in the Karadere area, massive protests on 23 March 2014 were held in the cities of Sofia, Plovdiv and Varna; and a counter-protest in Byala. The protesters expressed their view that the few environmentally well-preserved areas in the country should not be turned into concrete landscapes. Allegations have surfaced that architect Georgiy Stanishev, brother of Sergei Stanishev, had been behind this project, but he has denied any involvement.

=== April 2014: Renewed attention on Peevski and anticipation of the European elections ===
A new wave of protests occurred in April after rumour spread in the media that Delyan Peevski would be included in the elections list of the Movement for Rights and Freedoms (DPS) for the upcoming European Parliament election that are going to take place in late May. A group called "Делян Европеевски" (English: Delyan Europeevski) had already been created in Facebook with the motto 'We did not allow the mummy's boy to be appointed in DANS, let us not allow him to be elected in the European Parliament'. As of 10 April 2014, the group reached more than 700 followers. On 9 April 2014, a protest took place in front of the building of the Council of Ministers. The protesters organized themselves using the social network.

=== May 2014: Low profile of protest gatherings and European elections campaigning ===
On 12 May 2014, hundreds of demonstrators gathered in front of the Council of Ministers to mark the 333rd day of protests (as well as one year since the 2013 Parliamentary elections that were held ahead of schedule). The protesters took a detour from their usual route towards the National Parliament and Eagles' Bridge, marching in the direction of the MRF and BSP party headquarters. Members of "protest network" also extended an invitation to Peevski to discuss with them his European Parliament campaign as well as his positions on the main EU-related debates. A small protest and counter-protest were held on 28 May, during the first Parliament session in the aftermath of the European Parliament election, which saw an unsatisfactory performance of the main governing electoral alliance Coalition for Bulgaria and were interpreted by experts as being likely to strengthen the protest potential (with a more prominent political involvement in the demonstrations) due to the continued decline of the legitimacy of the government. Shortly after the EP elections, Peevski decided against becoming a member of the European Parliament, explaining that his motivation to participate in the election process had stemmed from a desire to simply restore his reputation.

=== June 2014: Political developments sideline protests ===
On 5 June 2014, MRF leader Lyutvi Mestan held a press conference, announcing that the results of the recent European Parliament election make it impossible for the Oresharski cabinet to fulfill its full mandate. He sketched out three different early election scenarios, expressing a preference for them to be held at the end of 2014. The MRF party's statements were widely regarded as an indication that the junior coalition party has withdrawn its support from the government, making its prospects to continue to be in charge of decision-making quite slim. Mestan has downplayed the role of the protests or the configurations in Parliament as a reason for his declaration. Disagreements between the MRF and BSP regarding the possible implementation of the South Stream energy project have been identified as one additional factor behind the change in the coalition dynamics. The nationalist Attack also joined the calls for a resignation of the government, stating that it was no longer in a position to support it, criticizing the lack of sufficient social policies implemented by the cabinet and the "bowing down to American pressure" due to Oresharski's decision to put a stop to South Stream. The Prime Minister's choice of action regarding the energy project was not reflective of a consensus within the ranks of the BSP party and some prominent socialist politicians were taken aback and expressed disapproval.

In the aftermath of Mestan's announcement, Stanishev voiced support for compulsory voting and on 10 June insisted that the early elections be held by the end of July. Stanishev was overruled by his party colleagues regarding his idea for prompt July elections and BSP confirmed that it will be entering talks with the other main parties and the president of the country Rosen Plevneliev, so that an exact date for the early elections could be agreed upon. A jubilee protest took place on 14 June in Sofia and a few other major cities, with a number of the protest leaders holding a press conference in the area close to the people's library in the capital. Estimates suggested a turnout in the high thousands. On 17 June, following a meeting in the presidency that saw the presence of Rosen Plevneliev, Plamen Oresharski and the leaders of all the parties represented in the National Parliament, a consensus was reached that the early elections will be scheduled at some point between 28 September and 12 October. During the negotiations, anti-government demonstrators, Ataka sympathizers and affiliates of the citizen movement "Today" (Bulgarian: Гражданско движение "ДНЕС") (who set up a symbolic round table with the photos of all the main politicians to emphasize their message of national unity) held various protests simultaneously. On 27 June, after another meeting of the heads of all the major parties (Attack was the only one not represented, as Volen Siderov did not attend, but Nikolay Barekov participated in the negotiations despite his party then holding no seats in the National Parliament), the date of 5 October 2014 was fixed for the next election. The 42nd National Assembly was set to dissolve itself on 6 August 2014. The protests are believed to have helped mobilize the Bulgarian electorate to vote in the 2014 European Parliament elections.

=== July 2014: Government resignation and end of protest activities ===
On 17 July 2014, Mihail Mikov announced that the government would likely resign on 23 July and the National Parliament was prepared to subject the matter to a vote on that date. At 17:59 (Bulgarian time) on 23 July, Oresharski submitted his resignation. On that date, protests had occurred in order to put pressure on the government to keep its promise to resign and a "Protest of joy" (Bulgarian: "Протест на радостта") took place in the aftermath of Oresharski's depositing of his resignation. The resignation was accepted in the National Parliament on the next day, with 180 MPs voting "for", 8 "against" and 8 abstaining. A caretaker government was then expected to assume power to prepare the ground for the October elections after the major parties declined to form a new cabinet.

=== August 2014: Caretaker government takes power ===
Georgi Bliznashki's government was announced on 5 August and began its two-month mandate on the next day. On 6 August, in accordance with the previously made agreement among the main parties, Rosen Plevneliev officially disbanded the National Parliament. On 10 August, in an open letter to the media, Krasimira Medarova stated that she had requested from the president to step down from her position as minister in charge of the preparation for the early elections in order not to impede the work of the caretaker government after her appointment faced criticism from citizen organizations, protest network and the Reformist Bloc due to a presumed conflict of interest because of her previous affiliations with GERB. Medarova's case also sparked discussions regarding the viability of a separate ministerial post for the organization of the electoral processes and caused some controversy due to creating the impression that protest network was applying undue pressure on the provisional government. BSP has publicly criticized the composition of the caretaker cabinet, viewing it as almost exclusively consisting of figures affiliated with GERB, the Reformist Bloc and protest network. The issue has been the cause of media cross-fires between the two main political parties in Bulgaria. Volen Siderov has also suggested that protest network plays a prominent role in the caretaker government.

== Counter-protests ==
=== Main activities and societal feedback ===
The first counter-protest was held on 23 June, in the vicinity of the National Palace of Culture. Counter-protests were said to be paid (see protests and counter protests in Ukraine – Euromaidan), a practice that had started earlier with the paid protesters of extreme right-wing party Ataka, which was documented by National Television of Bulgaria. The practice of paid counter protesting started almost as soon as the large protests against Oresharski occurred (early August 2013) and had its peak with the massive counter-protest that was organized by the BSP and DPS with priorly scheduled trains for the paid protesters on 16 November in Sofia and even against Plevneliev who showed democratic sympathies and as seen by some on the side of the anti-Oresharski protesters, with the number of participants estimated as close to 50,000 by the Bulgarian Ministry of Internal Affairs. During the 16 November counter-protest, there were some concerns mainly expressed by pro-protest activists that the government sympathizers (especially those from the MRF, many of whom have Turkish heritage) could come into close proximity with the Levski Sofia and CSKA Sofia football fans who were expected to attend The Eternal Derby (first leg of a Round 2 Bulgarian Cup match), which could spark a confrontation, but the day passed by without any serious incidents. The amicable hug between Lyutvi Mestan and Sergei Stanishev at Eagle's Bridge came to be widely interpreted as a symbolic gesture of forgiveness on the part of MRF, bearing in mind the BSP predecessor party's role in the orchestration of the Process of Rebirth in the 1980s. For this and other reasons, former vice-chairman of the MRF and Ahmed Dogan right-hand man Osman Oktay has been highly critical of the nature of the BSP-MRF relationship dynamics.

On 22 July, around 30 pro-government protesters demonstrated in front of the French embassy in Sofia, frowning upon what they saw as the French ambassador Philippe Autié's interference in Bulgaria's internal affairs due to his support for the anti-Oresharski rallies.

Since August 2013, the main leaders of the counter-protest movement also started organizing tours around the country, visiting different cities in order to speak in front of the local inhabitants. Around mid August, the counter-protests began to take place concurrently with the anti-government protests.

As of late August 2013, the counter-demonstrators claimed to have collected 384,000 signatures in support of the government. The pro-government citizens also accused the president of abandoning his duty as a national unifier and signed petitions calling for his removal from office. They instead extended support to vice-president Margarita Popova.

The counter-protests generally saw a lesser turnout compared to the anti-government protests and according to an Alpha Research survey (taking into account the period between 19 and 27 August) were backed by approximately one third of Bulgarian citizens. While endorsing the right of any national to peacefully protest, president Rosen Plevneliev has depicted the counter-protests as a Bulgarian innovation and also expressed a concern that they could cause further alienation between citizens of disparate ideological persuasions. The counter-protests have been derisively labeled as "manifestations" by pro-protest activists such as Asen Genov due to supposedly lacking the organic nature of the anti-government ones and not being representative of civil society. According to Anna Krasteva, the year 2013 "professionalized" the counter-protest, making it an integral and recurring feature of protests in Bulgaria.

In early January 2014, Radoslav Gochev, one of the main organizers of the counter-protests, stated that they will be discontinuing any further events or demonstrations due to their belief that the government has now consolidated its position at the helm of the country. However, he also warned that the pro-government demonstrators remain fully prepared to hit the streets once again if the need arises.

Around 50 counter-protesters gathered close to the official entrance of the National Assembly on 15 January while the first session for the new year was being held in response to the presence of two groups of anti-government demonstrators on the other sides of the building.

=== Conspiracy theories about the protests ===
A number of the supporters of the counter-protests have voiced suspicions regarding the purported involvement (including the alleged offering of remuneration) of influential US-based activists and think tanks in providing impetus for the demonstrations, though this remains a fringe view among scholars. Similar conspiracy theories have been espoused by figures like Biser Milanov (who did not self-identify as a counter-protester, but was believed to fit this description by protest activists), who made a statement at the Council of Ministers in August 2013, in which he affirmed that his "National Liberty" movement would only support the government if it took adequate measures against "paid protesters", entailing granting them permission to create "volunteer patrols" who would operate together with police officers and apprehend "all protest organizers who are driven by a desire to promote George Soros' interests in Bulgaria". Rapper Mihail Mihaylov, who was described in the media as "one of the faces of the counter-protests", in a similar fashion expressed dismay at the alleged meddling of outside agents in Bulgarian affairs and in addition to that criticized the Borisov Government for its supposed authoritarian tendencies, thus subscribing to the argument that GERB was bound to be the beneficiary of any anti-government protests. According to research conducted by the Sofia Open Society Institute covering the months of June and July, only 7.4% of respondents cited the concern that GERB could return to the helm of the country as being among their reasons for refusing to participate in a protest. Journalist Petar Volgin, who was noted for his anti-protest philosophy in contrast to other media anchors, even though he participated in the early phase of the demonstrations, echoed some of the sentiments of the conspiracy theorists, maintaining that the spontaneity of the protests only persisted until about their fifth day, after which they were taken over by a collection of interested "political engineers" – right-wing activists, GERB affiliates and "tipping point" circles with close connections to selected oligarchs. Columnists associated with the Ataka party compared the protests to the Otpor! movement, from whose activists the "early rising students" are alleged (in other sources) to have drawn inspiration and received guidance, as well as the various colour revolutions that are also purported to have been sponsored by pro-US activists and NGOs that are claimed to promote undesirable political correctness norms in Eastern European countries. Thus, foreign agents were deemed capable of exerting an influence of the momentum and intensity of the protests, with one of the speculations being that the government's decision to implicitly give the green light regarding the construction of a 7th unit of the Kozloduy Nuclear Power Plant (to be commissioned to American company Westinghouse), placated the pro-American NGOs in Bulgaria and brought about a dwindling in the protest waves. During the protests and following their cessation, Volen Siderov has referred to them as "an attempt to pull off a Bulgarian Maidan". He has also alleged that Oresharski had a pang of conscience and decided to resign after refusing to accede to American demands (with the insistence to abandon South Stream being the only one to be made public) put forth during a meeting with John McCain in June 2014, which included (amongst others) providing the United States with a carte blanche to use Bulgarian military airports for the purpose of military and logistical actions in light of the Russo-Ukrainian war as well as sending Bulgarian troops to fight against the pro-Russian rebels in Ukraine. It has been alleged that parties such as BSP encouraged their supporters to flood Internet forums with anti-protest messages (attempting to divert discussions in the direction of conspiracy theories).

== Responses and Reactions ==
=== Government response to the protests ===
On 19 June, Oresharski acknowledged that he had made a political miscalculation with the DANS appointment and apologized to the protesters and the rest of the Bulgarian citizens, while also stating that stepping down would not be conducive to his overarching aim of restoring political stability. He also requested a grace period from the general public until a number of urgent social policy reforms are implemented. Oresharski emphasized that he was always open to engaging in discussions with the protesters. Minister of Education Aneliya Klisarova characterized the protests as motivational in the sense of providing further impetus for the government to work for the betterment of the country. However, she also criticized the occupation of the universities and expressed concerns regarding the nature of the student demands, seeing them as solely political rather than education-related. Sergei Stanishev and Oresharski maintained that the ongoing protests were an indication that the "chains of fear" that had gripped society and the media in previous years have been removed from the popular consciousness of the citizens. Valeri Zhablyanov, a BSP party deputy, insisted that from the outset the origins of the protest movement lied in an unwillingness to recognize the election results rather than opposition to the Peevski appointment, believing that they could thus set a dangerous precedent with regard to the stability of the democratic mechanisms in the country. In late June 2013, the chairperson of the National Parliament Mihail Mikov criticized the general media coverage of the protests, stating that the ways in which the demonstrations were being framed could (alongside other factors) bring about their escalation, and urged media representatives to show responsibility and the necessary measure of calm when it came to their reporting. Mikov's statement was in turn condemned by prominent journalists and media outlets as well as the Bulgarian Helsinki Committee due to being interpreted as indicating a potential willingness on the part of the government to infringe on media freedom. Oresharski, Minister of Interior Tzvetlin Yovchev as well as other members of the cabinet held a number of meetings with protest figures (in the Council of Ministers building), though doubts have been expressed with regard to the extent to which the people who took part in these discussions were sufficiently representative of the protest movement as a whole, with some of those staunchly opposed to the government even labeling the participants in these events as "convenient protesters". Since September 2013, the government tended to refer to the protests as explicitly political due to GERB supposedly showing its interest in assuming leadership of the demonstrations. MRF leader Lyutvi Mestan stated that the main opposition party (GERB) itself has a history of being closely linked to oligarchic structures.

=== Public reactions to the protests ===
While initially (prior to Peevski's resignation), opinion polls revealed that 85% of Sofia citizens were supportive of the protests (with only 23% declaring trust in the Oresharski cabinet), approval for the protests dropped to 56% in mid July 2013 (with 37% expressing opposition to them and 48% believing them to be "politically motivated") based on nationwide surveys administered by Sova Harris. In the months of September and October, societal reactions to the protests continued to be mixed, with a relatively even split between pro- and anti-protest voices. However, Alpha Research surveys (administered nationwide between 26 and 31 October as well as covering the period between 30 November and 8 December) indicated that the student protests enjoyed a slightly higher degree of popular support than the original demonstrations involving other societal members. In response to Gallup Research questions regarding their voting preferences if the elections were to be held on the same day in which the October surveys were administered, approximately 22% of interviewees stated that they would likely pick the governing Bulgarian Socialist Party and circa 19% affirmed that they would be inclined to vote for the main one in opposition – Citizens for European Development of Bulgaria, which was reflective of the parity when it came to popular support in the case of the two parties.

A petition entitled "Sofia without roadblocks" (Bulgarian: "София без блокади") was circulated in late July 2013 due to dissatisfaction on the part of some citizens because of the traffic disruptions on the main boulevards in the central part of the capital city and noise pollution as a result of the protest activities (caused by both protesters and counter-protesters). Former Bulgarian Interior Minister Bogomil Bonev was among the initiators of the petition. 90% of Sofia citizens insisted that protests were to be conducted in full compliance with the legal regulations pertaining to mass citizen gatherings.

The protests against the Oresharski cabinet were supported by 60 percent of Bulgarians, according to a poll by the independent Alpha Research for the month of November. Research conducted by the Sofia Open Society Institute (analyzing the political situation in the country over the course of the June and July months) reveals that the most active participants in the protests tended to be young (aged below 30 years), were based in the capital Sofia, leaned to the centre-right or right of the political spectrum and possessed a higher than average income. The middle class social stratum from Sofia has been singled out as constituting a core of the protest. Similarly, Leviev-Sawyer believes that even during their short escalation phase in late July 2013, the demonstrations retained features of protests typical of the middle class. A generational gap as well as an urban-rural divide have been an aspect of the public reactions to the demonstrations, with those residing in non-urban areas and aged over 60 on the whole significantly less supportive of the protests. Goranova identifies the primacy of economic over political concerns due to poverty, the presence of remnants of feudalist structures in the smaller cities and villages (causing a certain built-in reluctance to protest due to fears of job losses), the significant proportion of elderly people (who have a natural aversion to instability) and the lack of sufficient trust in the youth as some of the reasons for the lacking protest activities outside the major cities. In addition, members of ethnic minority groups were generally not as favorably disposed to the protests, with this finding especially applicable to ethnic Turks and Romani people who typically declared a lesser willingness to participate in demonstrations in comparison to ethnic Bulgarians. Confederation of Labour Podkrepa president Konstantin Trenchev, in an August 2013 interview, did not call for national strike action against the government, but cautioned that conditions may become ripe for resorting to such activities at some point in the autumn. The trade union has been criticized by some experts for violating the constitution by setting political targets for itself and engaging in the type of political activism that is the prerogative solely of political parties. Figures provided by Gallup, based on interviews with more than 1000 citizens held between 9 and 16 January 2014, indicated that 40% believed that the protests should continue, with the same percentage of people having the opposite view. A late January 2014 survey conducted by the Confederation of Independent Syndicates in Bulgaria revealed that at least one third of their members were adamant that Parliamentary elections need to be held alongside the upcoming European elections. According to a Gallup poll, 43% of Bulgarians regarded the media reporting on the protests as objective, while 30% characterized the electronic and printed media outlets as displaying subjectivity in their coverage. Of the latter respondents, 19% considered the bias to be pro-protest and 11% identified it as pro-government. The electronic and print media in Bulgaria are generally regarded as tending to shy away from publishing materials explicitly critical of governments, but businessman and direct democracy supporter Petar Klisarov insists that the main media were passive and relatively objective in their reporting of the 2013 anti-Borisov protests while from the very beginning they unequivocally took the side of the protesters in their coverage of the anti-Oresharski movement. According to academic Orlin Spasov, the protests saw significantly more intra-societal cleavages (Russophiles vs. Russophobes, communists vs. anti-communists and so on) compared to the winter discontent against Borisov's cabinet that mainly juxtaposed the political elites against the people, which made it much more difficult for the media anchors to cover them.

=== International reactions to the protests ===
In the first two months (prior to the minor escalation phase of 23–24 July), the protests did not receive significant coverage in international media, especially relative to the more numerous and violent demonstrations in Turkey, Brazil as well as the anti- and post-Morsi unrest in Egypt. The protest activities and messages were endorsed by prominent European Union politicians such as European Commissioner for Justice, Fundamental Rights and Citizenship Viviane Reding and also garnered the approval of the French and German ambassadors to Bulgaria, Philippe Autié and Matthias Höpfner. The latter two welcomed Rosen Plevneliev's call for a new morality in politics that was in accordance with European values, also emphasizing that there was a crisis of trust when it comes to the institutions and elites in the country as well as some worrying signs pertaining a concentration of media ownership, which could herald risks for the continued thriving of freedom of speech. The ambassadors praised both the protesters and the Bulgarian police for behaving in a way that was conducive to the peaceful expression of the civil society spirit. In addition, Autié and Höpfner stressed that the "oligarchic model" was not suitable for any country and could only lead to the creation of a "state within a state". Dutch ambassador to Bulgaria Karel van Kesteren referred to the protests as a "sign of hope" and the first clear instance of civil society rearing its head to clamor for the observance of European values since Bulgaria's accession to the EU. He also expressed disquiet about the role of Attack as well as its ability to influence proceedings and reminded the government that election wins are just one component of democracy that should not be a substitute for responsible governance and lack of secrecy in decision-making. His Belgian counterpart to Bulgaria Anik van Kalster stated that "the best solution [to the crisis of legitimacy] was the one that was widely supported by the society as a whole" and also played down the concerns that Belgian investments in Bulgaria could be negatively affected due to the political uncertainty. In relation to the Peevski situation, she reminded the government of the European Commission's insistence for certain standards to be respected when high-level appointments are made and the need for the primacy of the legal order to remain unchallenged. Van Kalster lauded the peaceful character of the protests and depicted them as a continuation of the February demonstrations, but with a higher premium placed on ideals and principles rather than economic issues. In June 2013, Hannes Swoboda, President of the group of the S&D in the European Parliament, stated that the Oresharski government deserves support, maintaining that the social measures suggested by the cabinet were necessary for the country. He also commended Stanishev for being forward-looking and having a long record in promoting modernization. However, Swoboda criticized the appointment of Delyan Peevski as well as the decision to elect Volen Siderov as chairman of the Parliamentary commission for fighting corruption, warning the governing BSP party that it would need to go to extra lengths in order to preserve its values and provide a true "left alternative" to the Borisov cabinet (due to the BSP's alliance with the MRF and Ataka). He also emphasized that Bulgaria needed fundamental changes in its political system and urged the government to be constantly engaged in a dialogue with the wider society and prioritize the promotion of political transparency and democratic principles. In Antoniy Galabov's view, PES' support for Stanishev was a risky strategy, as it could negatively affect the electoral fortunes for the European political party in the 2014 European election. The EU urged BSP and GERB to exhibit cooperative behaviour towards each other. French ambassador to Bulgaria, Xavier Lapeyre de Cabanes, diagnosed Bulgaria's corruption problems as deeply rooted, stipulating that the underlying motivations for such protests had been brewing under the surface since the 1990s. He also acknowledged that a variety of anti-corruption measures have been implemented since the collapse of communism and observed that the country's xenophobia had not reached dangerous levels. Daniel Cohn-Bendit, a leading personality during the 1968 student protests in France, sent out a note, in which he expressed support for the Bulgarian student occupiers. Polish historian and prominent former anti-communist dissident Adam Michnik was more cautious in his assessment of the protests, stating that the main reason for them was the "lack of a political culture as well as an absence of a culture of compromise", which from his standpoint is still an issue for other Eastern European countries besides Bulgaria because of the effects of communism on the mentality of citizens and the paucity of democratic traditions. He sees the political elites as a reflection of society and emphasizes that in cases when fair elections bring unsympathetic "old [communist] apparatus" members to power, this needs to be accepted, as "democracy should apply to all, not only to those who are intelligent and have perfectly sound moral qualities".

== Expert opinions ==
=== Underlying and less explicit reasons for the protests ===
Ognyan Minchev stressed that one of the main reasons behind the lack of legitimacy of the Oresharski government is that its coming to power was made possible by the actions of an oligarchic structure (formerly allied to Borisov) which used underhanded maneuvers to discredit GERB (including on the days prior to the parliamentary election), for example by demonizing Tsvetan Tsvetanov in the media, with this smear campaign unwittingly aided by the economic grievances against the GERB administration on the part of the citizens. He insists that currently the major issues are connected to Bulgaria being in a political crisis attributable to state capture. Kozhouharov concurred with this viewpoint and in addition to that appraises the February protests as part of an orchestrated strategy to depose GERB and pave the way for the ascent of the current governing coalition. Former Deputy Prime Minister and Minister of Finance Simeon Dyankov characterizes the formation of the Oresharski government as a "soft coup" due to the collusion of the other parties in the National Parliament against GERB. Suspicions regarding the increased role played by the Movement for Rights and Freedoms party (whose support base is predominantly ethnically Turkish, Muslim Roma and Bulgarian Muslim) in the governance of the country were also identified as a catalyst for some elements of the protest movement. Staunchly anti-communist politician Edvin Sugarev alleged that the Oresharski government intended to distance Bulgaria from the European Union and set the stage for bringing the country in the Eurasian sphere of influence in the long-term.

=== Characteristics of the protests ===
Marking a creative shift and vividly exemplifying a newly emerging protest culture, dominated by the youngest generations, the demonstrations have been praised for their authenticity in the expression of popular grievances, skillfully integrating "numerous colourful performance elements" in their repertoire, and have been characterized "as one of the first protest gatherings of a markedly political nature" since the beginning of the post-1989 transition, thus reflective of the sentiment that the governing elite has exhausted its credit of confidence. In contrast to the 1997 anti-government civil disobedience campaign, the protests have generally been described as "politicized" instead of "particized" because of the impetus for action coming from the protesters themselves rather than the charismatic leadership of influential politicians in opposition, with a moral outrage lacking any significant economic underpinning providing the fuel for the demonstrations. However, some analysts have nonetheless identified a strong political dimension to them, alleging that centre-right parties such as the UDF and the DSB were a driving force behind the protests, which is also believed to have actually contributed to them gradually fizzling out. In addition, the protests are gauged to have brought about the resurfacing of some antagonisms on the axis of communism vs. anti-communism, which was typical of the political landscape in the 1990s, though political commentator Evgeniy Daynov disagrees, believing that they largely succeeded in transcending this divide, broaching new subjects for discussion not connected to the communism vs. anticommunism dichotomy. In cultural anthropologist Ivaylo Ditchev's view, it never became clear whether the protests were "left" or "right".

=== Achievements of the protests ===
Depicted as part of a "second democratic revolution" in Bulgaria, the protests (as well as the previously held anti-austerity demonstrations) have been credited with bringing about the rebirth of civil society in the country, elevating it to an important arbiter of political processes, and sparking a renewed interest in political issues in addition to an increased awareness of the principles of representative democracy. The demonstrations are also believed to have orchestrated a paradigm shift in the attitudes of Bulgarians, with the "exit" narrative pushed to the backstage by the one emphasizing "voice" and empowerment - while in previous years emigration from the country was viewed as the principal way to express opposition to pernicious practices on the government level such as corruption, in 2013 a new determination to stay in Bulgaria and "transform the state" emerged. Political scientist Ivan Krastev regards the protests as successful due to heightening the Bulgarian people's support for democracy and the European Union. According to Vasil Garnizov, as a result of them the government has become more responsive to the voice of the citizens by carefully evaluating public opinion with regard to certain policies (for example, in relation to the possible removal of the restrictions on smoking in eating establishments) and refraining from dabbling with controversial appointments, though some analysts like historian Iskra Baeva cautioned that the overly generic and all-encompassing nature of the demands coupled with the tendency to deny the legitimacy of all political institutions in the country might not be the best approach for the protesters and was unlikely to yield constructive results. Anna Krasteva believes that the anti-Oresharski demonstrations helped establish the protest as a strong source of political legitimacy, reducing the importance of other factors such as the representation of parties in the National Parliament or electoral percentages. Evgeniy Daynov opines that the protests helped define the parameters of Bulgarian politics in the 21st century.

=== Criticism of the protests ===
==== Violations of the law ====
Author Hristo Stoyanov has been critical of the tendency to impute false intellectualism to some of those engaging in legal transgressions as a way of protest, seeing the methods employed by the protesters between 23 and 24 July 2013 as a threat to the fundamentals of Bulgarian democracy. Analyst Petar Klisarov has voiced his disapproval of the demonstrators (especially the emigrant students who participated in protests on 26 December 2013 and 3 January 2014) for flaunting Bulgarian legal regulations, for example by behaving disrespectfully towards police officers and blocking the city traffic on a whim, suggesting that they would have been much more disciplined and law-abiding if the activities were taking place abroad. Sofia mayor Yordanka Fandakova is also claimed to have been overly permissive of the demonstrators at the expense of the other members of society.

==== Striving for depoliticization and protest exceptionalism ====
Former Bulgarian Prime Minister Ivan Kostov has criticized some of the protesters' tendency to be dismissive of the achievements of the Bulgarian transition since 1989, highlighting that Bulgarian civil society was already alive and kicking between 1996 and 1997. According to a report generated by the "Laboratory for Governing Risks" (of which Kostov is a member) affiliated to New Bulgarian University, the protesters' refusal to accept any guidance from political figures as well as the general reluctance to add an explicitly political dimension to their actions, evidenced by the lack of a political program, stifled the potential of their movement. In this regard, the student occupiers are believed to have been relatively unsuccessful in broadening the appeal of their cause and reaching out to other members of society.

==== Overemphasis on theatric elements ====
Political scientist Boris Popivanov opined that the mass protests of the initial months were gradually replaced by smaller-scale demonstrations that emphasized "creative and artistic elements" as well as "aesthetic provocations", which were not well understood and difficult to relate to by the wider public. Thus, the accent on various theatric aspects was seen to have inadvertently obscured the underlying goal of forcing a government resignation. Political researcher Ivan Nachev suggested that the demonstrations needed to be held less frequently, but with a higher turnout, better organization and protest messages that were clearly formulated, so that the protest movement did not fall into the trappings of banalization. He also urged both the government and the protesters to show greater determination to find some sort of a middle ground when engaging in dialogue.

==== Misplaced anticommunism and general anti-leftist orientation ====
Popivanov characterizes the protests as exhibiting a strong anti-leftist slant, which in his view enabled the Bulgarian Socialist Party to consolidate its ranks and rally its supporters. The chairman of the Institute for Modern Politics, Borislav Tsekov, concurs with this assessment, deploring the "primitive anti-communism" espoused by the protesters due to being almost reminiscent of the spirit of McCarthyism. Left wing journalist Velislava Dareva, in addition to frowning upon the viscerally anti-communist rhetoric engaged in by the protesters, also believes that the protest lacked focus due to containing at least 10 different protester groups (demonstrating for hugely different reasons) within its ranks. However, the student occupiers have been described as somewhat less eager to jump on the anti-communist bandwagon. Left wing sociologist Andrey Raychev makes a distinction between "citizen" and "political" protests (with only the anti-Peevski phase of the demonstrations fitting the former definition) and maintains that parties were gradually learning the lesson that they could not simply "insert themselves" into a demonstration of the citizens, but need to carve out a separate niche. Due to the perceived anti-leftist leanings of the protesters, quite a few left-wing commentators (somewhat paradoxically given that globally protests tend to resonate with those who are on the left side of the political spectrum) took a stand against the demonstrations.

==== Political entrepreneurship and the student occupations ====
Direct democracy proponent Petar Klisarov questioned the occupiers' motives, believing them to have been under the undue influence of political figures who would come to be associated with the Reformist Bloc. Evgeniy Daynov, while sympathetic to the occupiers, noted that like in the case of most protests in Bulgaria's history, the students were once again rather late in joining the protest action. The student occupiers were criticized by senior officials from Sofia University for making the university an arena for political struggles by engaging in politically motivated activities, thus violating the internal regulations of the institution.

==== Inability of the protest to propose political alternatives and misreading of the economic § political situation ====
Political scientist Deyan Kyuranov regarded the government figures as redeemable despite the Peevski debacle, attributing the calls for the resignation of the government to the inertia of the initial anti-Peevski protest wave rather than logically or morally grounded arguments. In August 2013, former Bulgarian Prime Minister and Tsar Simeon Saxe-Coburg-Gotha commented that the protests were reflective of "certain stakeholders' willingness to make use of the imperfections of democracy to sow disunity and cause divisions" between protesters and anti-protesters, members of various ethnic groups as well as people with different personality traits. He also questioned the degree to which the protests were representative of the wider society and criticized the media's disproportionate coverage of the demonstrations as well as the media anchors' lack of objectivity (i.e. when reporting on the actions of police officers) due to [them] "becoming factors in determining the political processes" rather than relaying information. Analysts who tended to be opposed to the protests pointed out that Bulgarian society had begun to suffer from a "protest fatigue" and the majority of citizens wanted the government to be given a chance to implement its policy aims before casting judgment on it. They also downplayed the parallels between the then anti-government wave and the 1997 demonstrations that brought down the cabinet envisioned by BSP because of their belief that the economic and financial climate in Bulgaria during Oresharski's tenure could hardly be depicted as being in an acute state of crisis. In this context, it is emphasized that the government was able to continue its mandate for longer than expected due to a combination of chance factors outside of its control (not necessarily related to the protests), including the reduction in the negative externalities because of the subsiding of the economic crisis and the relatively benevolent investment climate in Bulgaria as well as the lack of viable political alternatives. The protests have also come under fire by some sources due to exhibiting a general spirit of negativity and placing illogical demands. In October 2013, in an interview with Dnevnik, Ivan Kostov expressed the opinion that Peevski was certainly being demonized and took issue with the personal attacks against him, viewing them as unconstructive and not in line with European values.

=== Predictions and future eventualities ===
Petar Mitev noted that despite the fact that there was a significant discrepancy in viewpoints between the government and the presidency, the former would not benefit from a strategy premised on seriously discrediting the latter, as this could lead to general political chaos and embolden the protesters. In November 2013, culturologist Ivaylo Ditchev, in a contribution for Deutsche Welle, analyzed some possible scenarios that could bring about a resignation of the government – his preferred one was a "moral catharsis of Bulgarian society", with students inspiring the support of wide segments of the intelligentsia, who in turn could convince a majority of ordinary citizens to join the anti-government wave. A Citizen Forum (reminiscent of the one established in 1989 Czechoslovakia) was to be created and serve as a guarantor for the cleansing of Bulgarian politics – the participants in it would set the tone for political discussions, but refrain from taking part in politics. However, he regarded this scenario as rather utopian and drew attention to the more realistic (if increasingly less appealing – from his standpoint – possibilities) – corporate and social issues like those related to health care causing a mass discontent and unions going on strike, triggering a paralysis of the country; "behind the curtain events" within the political echelons themselves, with GERB succeeding in using procedural tools (also with the tacit support of Western allies) to alter the balance of power in the National Assembly; the Attack party withdrawing its support for the government and emerging as the political face of popular protests inspired by nationalist causes (possibly attributable issues like the Syrian refugee crisis and illegal African migrants or concerns pertaining to the selling of Bulgarian land to foreigners). The latter scenario was considered to be especially problematic and as being incompatible with the underlying goals of the protest movement, because the new Parliament formed after such events would almost inevitably include fascist-leaning parties and would need to contend with significant polarization due to the presence of pro- and anti-European voices. In April 2014, sociologist Mikhail Mirchev rated the cabinet's chances to fend off future storms as good, but cautioned that the MRF was not necessarily a reliable coalition partner (judging by the past history of the MRF-BSP coalition dynamics) and any erratic behaviour on their part could be a major factor in bringing down the government. German political researcher Daniel Kadick noted that it may be advisable for a protest party to be formed, so that the then status quo in Bulgaria would not be recreated after the next elections and in order for the electoral prospects of populist movements like "Bulgaria without censorship" to be reduced. Intellectual, theater critic and popular talk show host Yulian Vuchkov declared his support for the protests, maintaining that they were long overdue because of the political passivity of Bulgarians, but opposed early elections due to his belief that it will take time for a successful "professor party" to be formed, so that it could become a viable election challenger. Political analysts Tihomir Bezlov and Ruslan Stefanov suggested that tensions along political lines may manifest themselves in the aftermath of the next Parliamentary elections (while holding the view that the caretaker government would not have to deal with popular discontent) and did not believe that the protest potential had been exhausted.

== Economic assessments ==
The security-related expenditures resulting from the protests (encompassing the period from 14 June to late November) have been evaluated as approximating 2 million BGN.

On 13 December 2013, Standard & Poor's Ratings Services amended its outlook for Bulgaria from "stable" to "negative", in part due to the political uncertainty that started with the February 2013 protests against the Borisov cabinet (and the then looming possibility of early elections as a result of the ongoing protests against the Oresharski cabinet). However, the country, as of mid December 2013, has retained its 'BBB/A-2' long- and short-term sovereign credit ratings. In June 2014, Standard & Poor's downgraded Bulgaria's short- and long-term credit ratings from 'BBB/A-2' to 'BBB/A-3' (though the country continues to be with a stable financial outlook), citing as the main reason the lack of political predictability.

== Controversies associated with the protests ==
=== Role of GERB ===
A number of commentators have criticized GERB for piling on the pressure on the government by behaving in a fashion that was contrary to the underlying tenets of Parliamentarism due to on occasions refusing to register or participate in Parliamentary sessions and thus impeding the work of the National Assembly. GERB brought forward a no-confidence motion against the government on 25 September 2013, but it could not be debated in the National Parliament, as its party representatives excused themselves from the proceedings.

=== Claims of paid protesters and counter-protesters ===
Allegations have surfaced in the media of a small proportion of the protesters and the counter-protesters having received financial incentives in order to attend gatherings in opposition to or in support of the government (see also counter-protest section). According to a BNT investigation, some of the Attack sympathizers received 30 leva per day to participate in protests (as a show of force in support of the nationalist party).

=== Foreign involvement in the protests ===
On 30 August 2013, during a Roger Waters concert in Sofia, the protest slogan "Оставка!" ("Resignation!") was displayed on the main screen in red letters. While a number of Bulgarians regarded it as a nice gesture in support of the protests, rapper Mihail Mihaylov, one of the main figures lauding the counter-protesters, voiced sharp criticism, with some elements in favor of the anti-government demonstrations also expressing disapproval due to their belief that the politicization of such public events contradicted some of the values the protest movement was premised upon.

On 17 July 2013, then French ambassador to Bulgaria Philippe Autié took part in a protest march. Following the end of his term as ambassador in September 2013 (when he was succeeded by Xavier Lapeyre de Cabanes), Autié was not honoured with the Order of Stara Planina, which has been the custom in the case of foreign ambassadors. While it has been suggested that the reason was the ongoing reconsideration of the circumstances as to when foreign diplomats are to be granted such official distinctions, other interpretations have suggested that Autié missed out on an award because of the solidarity he expressed with the demonstrators. However, on 1 October 2014, Autié and his German counterpart Matthias Höpfner received Bulgaria's most prestigious national decoration.

On 11 November 2013, former American ambassador to Bulgaria James Pardew was allowed to enter the premises of the occupied Sofia University. This raised eyebrows among the students opposed to the occupation, who demanded an explanation given that access had been denied to university administrators, academics and students not in favour of the occupiers' approach. The main spokesman for the occupying students Ivaylo Dinev claims that Pardew was not permitted to go inside the university building by student security (as the students were not fully convinced in the sincerity of his motives), but did speak to three of the student representatives inside the university premises.

=== Infiltration by undercover agents and provocation attempts ===
Despite being generally disciplined and non-violent with a high degree of success in reining in disruptive and subversive participants compared to previous anti-government movements in Bulgaria, the protests were not spared the involvement of agent provocateurs, some of them supposedly linked to Biser Milanov's "Liberty" national movement and Pavel Chernev (former member of Attack and then leader of the "Freedom" party (Bulgarian: партия "Свобода"), who subsequently distanced himself from Volen Siderov, becoming a major critic of him), though both of them have denied any ulterior motivations, with Chernev explaining that his entourage of young men in sporting attire were falsely labeled a provocateur group, when in actuality they had intended to protect the regular protesters from militant members of the Attack. 9 people alleged to have been attempting to disrupt the protests and encourage the commission of illegal acts were detained by the police during the protest activities of 18 June and 22 were apprehended on 23 June.

=== Scandals between Attack members and protesters ===
On 17 June 2013, there were tense scenes between sympathizers of the Attack and anti-government demonstrators close to the headquarters of the nationalists on Vrabcha Street, with some objects being thrown by both sides. The protesters have accused the Attack leadership of betraying the trust of the people and "phony nationalism" by refusing to vote against the formation of a government that includes the MRF. According to media reports, 3 people suffered light injuries and 1 person was arrested. On 28 October 2013, journalists from the TV7 news channel and Alfa TV (the media anchor of the Ataka party) were prevented from entering the university premises and reporting on the Sofia University occupation by a small number of students, security officers and anti-government demonstrators. In the evening of 8 November 2013, MP Desislav Chukolov and some other members and sympathizers of the Ataka party confronted a group of students who had been overheard chanting "Resignation!" near the headquarters of the Bulgarian National Television. In the ensuing commotion, a glass of red wine was spilled on Chukolov's shirt. Five students were subsequently arrested by the police, but were released on the next day without any charges pressed against them, though Chukolov has stated that he may take the matter to the courts. On 8 January 2014, Attack party deputies entered the Nova TV building and angrily demanded an explanation from protest activists Tsvetozar Valkov and Viktor Stoyanov who were being interviewed by host Milen Tsvetkov. Valkov and Stoyanov were wearing face masks of Volen Siderov and had previously participated in demonstrations in favour of revoking the Attack leader's parliamentary immunity. Nova TV staff emphasized that they had on numerous occasions extended invitations to Attack members to debate with other guests on Tsvetkov's show, but the Attack functionaries had rebuffed them, preferring to go about their endeavour through illegal means.

=== Disputes between occupying students and academics ===
On 27 November 2013, the occupying students filmed two professors from Sofia University who were celebrating a birthday and the conferral of a professorship while drinking alcohol on the premises of the university (outside working hours). While some commentators were critical of the academics for setting a bad example and possibly violating university policies, others condemned the students for going overboard in their desire to pontificate about morality and for supposedly being motivated by revanchism (because the two professors had publicly opposed the occupation). Ivaylo Dinev, one of the leading figures behind the first occupation, later regretted the decision to make the clip available to the general public, calling it a strategic and moral mistake, as it shifted the focus of the wider society on a relatively unimportant issue, caused the student protesters to lose some outside support, and created friction within the ranks of the occupying students themselves. He also acknowledged that drinking alcohol (by both students and academics) during special occasions had always been regarded as being compatible with the ethos of the university.

=== Measures employed by governmental, police and non-governmental entities to dissuade and discredit protesters ===
On 21 August 2013, Lidiya Yordanova, the head of the Bulgarian national sociological agency NCIOM (Bulgarian: НЦИОМ) was dismissed from her position by Mihail Mikov for disciplinary reasons. Shortly before that, NCIOM had provided figures suggesting a 60% public approval for the demonstrations, which is alleged to have possibly played a part in the then chairman of Parliament's decision. On 22 September 2013, during celebrations of National Independence Day in Veliko Tarnovo, police officers confiscated and destroyed anti-government posters from protesters. In mid November 2013, some Oresharski statements were interpreted as implying that public servants who take part in protests could be given the sack (which was criticized as anti-constitutional, with GERB referring the matter to the European Commission and the Association for European Integration and Human Rights informing the prosecutor-general of Bulgaria), but the Prime Minister subsequently clarified that only those who protest during their working hours could face the risk of being fired (Bulgarian legal regulations stipulate that civil servants may not engage in political activism in the workplace). Around the same time, allegations appeared in the media that the Parliamentary Secretary of the Ministry of Internal Affairs had provided BSP deputies with "bullet points", which were to be used as a blueprint by them when making statements about the anti-government protests. In January 2014, more than 40 football supporters from various fan clubs were called into police stations to sign protocols stipulating that they will not take part in any social disturbances. This requirement was criticized by prominent members of fan clubs and pro-protest activists as an unnecessary measure motivated by a desire to discourage the ultras' participation in anti-government protests. In March 2014, Atanas Uzunov, former top Bulgarian football referee and a member of GERB, was released from his duties as administrative director of Lokomotiv Plovdiv by owner Konstantin Dinev due to allegedly making use of his position to encourage the supporters of the club to take part in anti-government demonstrations. Plovdiv city councillors from the MRF party expressed satisfaction with the decision, also voicing suspicion that Uzunov may have been indirectly involved in the events of 14 February, when a crowd consisting mostly of football fans had surrounded and caused damage to the Dzhumaya mosque in Plovdiv. Throughout the protests, pro-protest activists frequently questioned the heavy police presence and the restrictions on the movement of ordinary citizens, believing such measures to be reminiscent of the totalitarian years.

In February 2015, the chairman of the parliamentary commission for public order and security (Bulgarian: парламентарната Комисия за вътрешен ред и сигурност) Atanas Atanasov confirmed previously made claims that protesters had been illegally monitored and wiretapped, revealing that this had occurred as part of a coordinated effort involving the Ministry of Interior, DANS and DATO (National Agency for Technical Operations) during the first 300 days of the anti-Oresharski demonstrations. The head of DANS is believed to have been privy to the whole process. It is also claimed that profiles with the personal data of more than 2000 protesters had been created. Former Interior Minister Tzvetlin Yovchev vigorously denied the allegations, calling them a lie. The Borisov Government launched an investigation.

=== Children participation in protest marches ===
Psychologists have questioned the developmental effects on children partaking in demonstrations, with former Bulgarian Prime Minister Simeon Saxe-Coburg-Gotha being one of the politicians especially critical of the practice, believing it to be contrary to the EU directives on the well-being of the underaged.

=== The Vandalizing of Communist-era Monuments ===
On 21 August 2013, the Soviet Army monument in Sofia was discovered to have been painted in pink, with the message "Bulgaria apologizes" in Bulgarian and Czech on display, a reference to the Bulgarian troops' participation in the 1968 Warsaw Pact invasion of Czechoslovakia. The Russian media voiced criticism and the police and judiciary vowed to investigate the matter. Soon thereafter, the Bulgaria – Russia Forum provided funds for the clean-up of the monument. A protester procession passed by the Czech embassy and the National Parliament, carrying a pink paper tank.

On 7 November 2013, Asen Genov, an Internet blogging pioneer in Bulgaria and a prominent contributor to "protest network" who had a prominent role in organizing the first anti-Peevski protest was arrested (alongside five other peers, four of them DSB activists) for spraypainting parts of a monument in front of the BSP party headquarters on Pozitano Street in Sofia. DSB leader Radan Kanev endorsed the actions of his party members, characterizing them as an appropriate expression of pro-protest views given the existence of a coalition of "former communists and contemporary fascists at the helm of the country".

On 23 February 2014, a Ukrainian flag was drawn on the Soviet Army monument in the capital of Bulgaria, with one of the soldier statues also painted in yellow and blue colours. A number of pro-Euromaidan messages such as "Слава Україні" ("Glory to Ukraine!") were also scribbled on it. A small anti-Oresharski protester group accompanied by journalist Ivo Indzhev subsequently arrived on the scene. This occurrence drew a sharp reaction from the Russian Foreign Ministry, which demanded that the culprits be identified and punished. Also, the Euronews TV channel's decision to show a photo of the painted monument on its Facebook page was criticized by the Russian ministry as "excessive". Shortly thereafter Euronews removed the image, clarifying that it did not support a particular side between the pro- and anti-government forces in Ukraine, least of all the participants in violent riots, and did not intend to besmirch the memory of Soviet veterans who had fought the Nazi regime invaders during World War II. The protests against the Oresharski cabinet are believed to have provided new fuel to the debates regarding the perceived Russophilic vs. Russophobic schism within Bulgarian society and the role of Bulgaria's European Union membership in changing the nature of its relations with Russia.

== Related developments ==
In September 2013, two freelance journalists at Deutsche Welle's Bulgarian desk were released from their contracts. The German media company explained that this was for failing to retain "objectivity, neutrality and balance" in their reporting of the protests. While DW publicly denied this to be linked to a recent letter of complaint from the CCB, opinion pieces in Bulgarian media outlets were predominantly of the opinion that the bank had put pressure on the broadcaster.

On 25 October, students from Sofia University occupied the central building of the university in downtown Sofia. They demanded immediate government resignation and new elections, as well as rule of law and a prioritization of education. The declaration was publicly read before present media. After that, the entrances to the University were fully blocked and almost all activities at the building ceased. According to students, between 70 and 100 people were present inside and only students were allowed in and out.

In early December, а three-person student delegation from Bulgaria that was accompanied by members of "protest network" visited Ukraine in order to voice their support for the Euromaidan participants. One of the occupying students read out their declaration at Maidan Nezalezhnosti. The occupying students also revealed that they intend to make a film about the events in the former Soviet republic and posted a trailer on YouTube. While admiring the underlying ideas behind Euromaidan and being touched by the reception that the Bulgarians received, Ivaylo Dinev, one of the most recognizable figures behind the occupation, in retrospect expressed sadness about how the anti-Yanukovych protests turned out due to the human casualties and the Ukrainian people eventually being pitted against each other rather than banding together to confront the national and global elites.

== Aftermath and legacy of the protests ==
On 7 November 2014, a coalition government headed by Boyko Borisov succeeded the interim cabinet of Georgi Bliznashki. The main group that was behind the student protests against Oresharski, which called itself "the early rising students" (Bulgarian: ранобудните студенти), has continued to rally against what they view as controversial appointments connected to the new government, mainly against Slavi Binev's chairmanship of the Commission for Culture and Media (Bulgarian: Комисия по култура и медии). Binev resigned on 8 December 2014 as a result of the controversy.

BSP is believed to have suffered both electoral (reduced support among its core sympathizers) and political losses (losing ground to new populist and nationalist parties) due to its supposed role in the entrenchment of the "Who" model (Bulgarian: моделът "КОЙ"), which is assumed to have been exemplified by the Oresharski government. References to this model - implying inappropriate interlinkages between government, big business, media and other "shadowy forces" which bring about an erosion of constitutional and democratic practices - were frequently made during the anti-Oresharski demonstrations. The protests also intensified the split between two main wings of BSP - the one loyal to Sergei Stanishev and the one taking cues from Georgi Parvanov, with the latter group forming the political project ABV in January 2014, which officially became a full-fledged political party in June of the same year. The protests are believed to have been a factor in making political actors more reluctant to include the MRF as part of governing coalitions. Oresharski's administration has drawn parallels with the Lyuben Berov cabinet, being regarded as another unsuccessful experiment with "expert" or "programme" governments.

== Miscellaneous ==
In the late evening hours of 18 August 2013, a gas bottle explosion occurred in a Chinese restaurant near the main area of the demonstrations. On 19 August 2013, the protesters observed two minutes of silence. In the subsequent days, a donation box was also set up in order to collect funds for the injured people. A woman from a nearby store (also among those who had sustained injuries) had previously offered products to the protesters at a discount. On 15 October 2013, in the 14th minute of the World Cup qualifier between Bulgaria and the Czech Republic, part of the supporters in the stadium erupted with shouts "Resignation!", followed by the chanting of then manager Luboslav Penev's name (to indicate that the coach was not the target of the fans' dissatisfaction). 'The protester' received the most votes for politician of the year 2013 in Bulgaria, while the anti-Oresharski protests were singled out as the event of the year in the country, based on the annual survey of Darik Radio. Between 10 September and 30 November 2014, the international festival Fotofabric took place in Sofia and included two main exhibitions at different locations in the city - "the protester" (an assortment of photo reports from recent protests around the world) and "the human and his states [of mind]" (consisting of artistic representations from the "Alcobendas" collection in Spain). Photos from the anti-Oresharski demonstrations that had been selected by Vasil Garnizov were also featured as part of the first exhibit.

== See also ==
- 2020–2021 Bulgarian protests - a similar protest movement involving Delyan Peevski
- 2025 Bulgarian protests - protests related to the protests in 2020 to 2021 but this time led by Gen Z activists
- List of protests in the 21st century

== Bibliography ==
Books

- Åslund, Anders; Dyankov, Simeon, eds. (2015). След Стената. Преходът в Източна Европа (1st ed.). Sofia: ИК „Колибри". ISBN 978-619-150-714-6.
- Daynov, Evgeniy (2017). Записки по революцията (1997-2017), том 3 (1st ed.). Sofia: „Ера". ISBN 978-954-389-450-5.
- Dinev, Ivaylo (2014). Наш ред е! (1st ed.). Sofia: Изток-Запад. ISBN 978-619-152-519-5.
- Ditchev, Ivaylo (2019). Културни сцени на политическото (1st ed.). Sofia: Просвета. ISBN 978-954-01-3909-8.
- Georgiev, Plamen (2013). За демокрацията и нейното българско приключение (1st ed.). Sofia: Пескадо. ISBN 978-619-901-811-8.
- Kanev, Dobrin; Todorov, Antoniy, eds. (2014). Качество на демокрацията в България (1st ed.). Sofia: Изток-Запад. ISBN 978-619-152-473-0. Archived from the original on 21 November 2015.
- Klisarov, Petar (2014). Огледало на протестите 2013-2014 (1st ed.). Sofia: Изток-Запад. ISBN 978-619-152-484-6.
- Kozhouharov, Kantcho (2014). Превратът срещу ГЕРБ и войната срещу демокрацията (1st ed.). Sofia: Лингея. ISBN 978-954-92471-7-6.
- Leviev-Sawyer, Clive (2015). Bulgaria: Politics and Protests in the 21st Century (1st ed.). Sofia: Рива. ISBN 978-954-32053-9-4.
- Lilov, Grigor (2013). Най-богатите българи (1st ed.). Sofia: "Кайлас" ЕООД. ISBN 978-954-92098-9-1.
- Nekov, Momchil (2013). От първо лице (1st ed.). Sofia: Ciela. ISBN 978-954-28143-3-7.
- Nikolov, Toni (2015). Пропуканата България - Записки по суматохата (1st ed.). Sofia: Хермес. ISBN 978-954-26141-8-0.
- Shemtov, Hristo (2013). Протест - Лозунги и отзвуци (1st ed.). Sofia: Фама. ISBN 978-954-59747-9-3.
- Smilov, Daniel; Vaysova, Lea, eds. (2013). #Протестът. Анализи и позиции в българската преса. Лято 2013 (1st ed.). Sofia: Изток-Запад. ISBN 978-619-152-351-1.
- Stoyanov, Hristo (2014). Протестните деца на България (народопсихологии) (1st ed.). Sofia: издателство "Христо" (self-published). ISBN 978-954-92722-5-3.
- Sugarev, Edvin (2013). Подлите времена (2nd ed.). Sofia: Изток-Запад. ISBN 978-619-152-291-0. Archived from the original on 2 April 2015.
- Todorov, Orlin (2016). България. Версия 0.5 (1st ed.). Sofia: Изток-Запад. ISBN 978-619-152-910-0.
- Vuchkov, Yulian (2013). България: преди, днес и утре (Мемоарна история на страната 1944–2013) (1st ed.). Sofia: Издателство "Даниела Убенова". ISBN 978-619-90174-1-8.

Articles and book chapters

- Babikian, Arman. "Уроци от изборите във Варна". In Smilov & Vaysova (2013), pp. 379–380.
- Bezlov, Tihomir. "Властта и протестът – кои фактори могат да докарат обрат". In Smilov & Vaysova (2013), pp. 221–225.
- Dimitrov, Ivan; Moskovska, Nadezhda. "Няма по-малкото зло". In Smilov & Vaysova (2013), pp. 181–184.
- Galabov, Antoniy. "Атака" говори на висок глас това, което БСП мисли". In Smilov & Vaysova (2013), pp. 398–400.
- Gochev, Georgi. "Къци, Мишо, неговите фенки и тяхната България". In Smilov & Vaysova (2013), pp. 293–296.
- Ivancheva, Maria. "Класовата война на България". In Smilov & Vaysova (2013), pp. 193–194.
- Kolarova, Rumyana. "ГЕРБ имат притеснения за парламентарната си група". In Smilov & Vaysova (2013), pp. 479–480.
- Lambrev, Yovko. "От блоговете: #ignorevolen е грешка". In Smilov & Vaysova (2013), pp. 379–380.
- Levchev, Vladimir. "За хулиганите и превратаджиите". In Smilov & Vaysova (2013), pp. 381–382.
- Medarov, Georgi. "Гражданите срещу задкулисието!". In Smilov & Vaysova (2013), pp. 71–73.
- Nikolov, Toni. "Театрализация и политика". In Smilov & Vaysova (2013), pp. 336–339.
- Popov, Yulian. "От блоговете: 7 причини за това защо изборите не проработиха и ще трябва да се повторят". In Smilov & Vaysova (2013), pp. 458–459.
- Simeonov, Parvan. "ДАНСwithme, млад меринджей". In Smilov & Vaysova (2013), pp. 204–206.
- Simov, Aleksandar. "Харта 2013 – моят прочит и критика". In Smilov & Vaysova (2013), pp. 83–87.
- Smilov, Daniel; Vaysova, Lea (2013b). "Предговор". In Smilov & Vaysova (2013), pp. 13–23.
- Spahiyski, Emil. "Битът убива протеста". In Smilov & Vaysova (2013), pp. 341–343.
- Volgin, Petar. "Голямата протестърска измама". In Smilov & Vaysova (2013), pp. 228–230.
- Yanakiev, Kalin. "Политическото дъно". In Smilov & Vaysova (2013), pp. 371–375.

Interviews (published)

- Boyadzhiev, Tsocho. "Фотография и протест". In Smilov & Vaysova (2013), pp. 124–131.
- Garnizov, Vasil. "Протестът дава шанс да се изгради нов институционален ред (интервю на Слав Оков)". In Smilov & Vaysova (2013), pp. 137–145.
- Gyrdev, Yavor. "Бунт за самоуважение". In Smilov & Vaysova (2013), pp. 111–117.
- Genova, Angelina. "Да възразиш срещу чуждите планове, или какво прави Правдолюб Иванов през последния месец". In Smilov & Vaysova (2013), pp. 150–154.
- Krastev, Ivan. "Протестиращите рискуват да останат политически изолирани". In Smilov & Vaysova (2013), pp. 452–453.
- Veleva, Valeriya. "Интервю на Валерия Велева с Делян Пеевски: "над никого няма да има чадър". In Smilov & Vaysova (2013), pp. 27–32.

Blog posts and official declarations

- Autié, Philippe; Höpfner, Matthias. "Изявлението на посланиците на Франция и Германия: доброто държавно управление е в интерес на всички". In Smilov & Vaysova (2013), pp. 365–367.
- Genov, Asen. "Протест, контрапротест, манифестация...". In Smilov & Vaysova (2013), pp. 297–298.
- Swoboda, Hannes. "ПЕС и Ханес Свобода". In Smilov & Vaysova (2013), pp. 150–154.
- Протестна Мрежа. "100-те успеха на протеста". In Smilov & Vaysova (2013), pp. 525–531.

Opinion polls

- Галъп. "Данни на Галъп". In Smilov & Vaysova (2013), pp. 323–324.
- НЦИОМ. "Данни на НЦИОМ". In Smilov & Vaysova (2013), pp. 313–315.
