= Murder of Mihail Stoyanov =

2008 murder in Sofia, Bulgaria

- Location: Sofia, Bulgaria
- Date: 30 September 2008 c. 21:30 (UTC+2)
- Attack type: Strangulation
- Perpetrators: Radoslav Kirchev; Aleksandar Georgiev

The murder of Mihail Stoyanov occurred on September 30, 2008, in Borisova gradina, in the Bulgarian capital of Sofia.

The murder was highly publicized among the media and the LGBT community. At the time of the murder, Stoyanov was a 25-year-old medical student in Sofia, and he was killed after a rough beating. There were no arrests for the first two years, but in June 2010 police arrested two suspects - 19-year-old Radoslav Kirchev and 20-year-old Aleksandar Georgiev. During interrogations, the pair claimed that they were participating in a group of five who were "cleaning up" the park from gay men. Authorities soon received information about at least 10 other attacks, which needed more evidence. Later on, the mother of Mihail, Hristina Stoyanova, pointed out before the media that she was unsure if her son was actually gay or not.

On May 4, 2012, a civil protest was organized against the slow process of Mihail's trial, as the investigation still hadn't ended, and the statute of limitations of two years was nearing an end, with which the suspects could be held on bail without being charged. The investigation officially ended on May 28, but there were no charges against the suspects until the fourth anniversary of Mihail's death on September 30. This caused NGOs to launch a national campaign to include sexual orientation as a marker in the Criminal Codex, of which hate crimes can be committed against.

In September 2012, the human rights organizations Bulgarian Helsinki Committee and Amnesty International spearheaded the campaign against the slow trial of Mihail Stoyanov's case.

In the middle of December 2012, the Sofia City Prosecutor presented an accusatory act against Aleksandar Georgiev and Radoslav Kirchev.

== Murder ==
On September 30, 2008, around 9:30 PM, Mihail Stoyanov left his home on "Mladost 3" in Sofia. He told his mother, Hristina, that he wants to take a break from studying for the matura and that he will return soon. He wore jeans, a green T-shirt with long sleeves, a grey and blue vest, beige-orange sports shoes and grey socks.

According to the prosecutor, later that night in an alley in Borisova gradina, Stoyanov came across a group of boys, among them Radoslav "Ratsata" Kirchev and Aleksandar "G" Georgiev. When he passed them, one of the boys attacked Mihail and started punching him in the face, head and chest, while another grabbed his face and started squeezing it. During the fight, a sudden snap was heard - the breaking of a bone. Stoyanov was beaten severely - kicked, strangled and jumped on. The student did not fight back, barely taking a breath before fainting. The assailants ditch him on the alley near the "Ropotamo" stop. Before fleeing, Georgiev turned him over and rummaged through his jeans' pockets, stealing a Nokia which would later give him away.

Mihail's body was found 30 meters deep in the park. The student had choked to death, due to asphyxiation.

== Investigation ==
After the murder, Kirchev boasted that he had beaten up Stoyanov, along with his friend Georgiev. According to the investigators, he even told a witness how the victim's neck "snapped".

Georgiev was the first to talk. He first asked a friend what would happen, if he killed somebody or was an accomplice to a murder. He then told him about the incident in the park, even mentioning the stolen mobile phone.

Indictments against the pair occurred after one of them used Stoyanov's phone around 50 days following the attack. Georgiev then told a friend of his to claim that he had bought it from somebody. Questionings by investigators and examinations of the places where it was used, however, proved the opposite. During an examination of the crime scene, hairs, keys, coins and a red comb were found, as well as blood under Mihail Stoyanov's nails.

The prosecutor made the murder charge, on the basis of hooliganistic tendencies. According to them, the attackers thought that the student looked like a gay, and that's why they hurled themselves at him. One from the group explained after the murder that there were many condoms in the park, which annoyed them very much. They believed it was from homosexuals, who "messed up the park". According to the defendant's lawyers, there was no evidence that the murder was done on homophobic grounds.

The version that Kirchev and Georgiev had an accomplice remained, as the blood found under Mihail's nails wasn't theirs. Initially, there was a third suspect, but the investigation against him was canceled.

Radoslav and Aleksandar were arrested on June 2, 2010. Due to the investigation taking too long, they were released on parole.

Hristina Stoyanova pointed out before the media that the slowness of the trial was due to the fact that the accused constantly complained about wanting to get released: "They always wanted to get released from prison and thus stalled the trial".

== Trial ==
In the end of October 2013, the first hearings were conducted for the case.

The pleadings for the case were set for June 15, 2014.

== Public reactions ==
On May 21, 2013, the Bulgarian Helsinki Committee asked for a second time the head prosecutor, now Sotir Tsatsarov, that the murder case be held under special circumstances.
