= Valentin Grancharov =

Valentin Grancharov Валентин Грънчаров
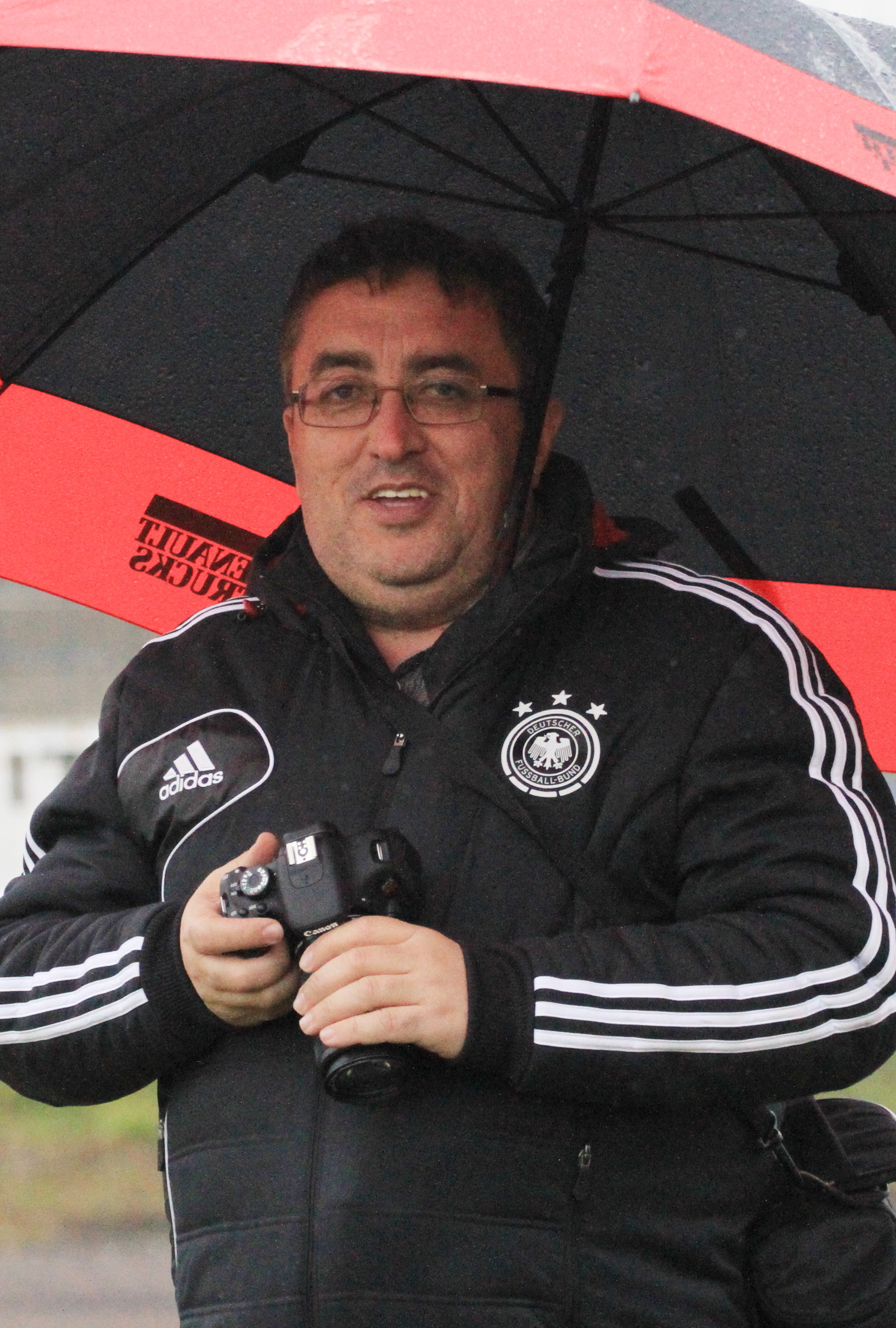
- Born: 15 April 1963 (age 63); Sofia, Bulgaria
- Occupation: Sports Journalist

Valentin Grancharov (Bulgarian: Валентин Грънчаров; born 15 April 1963 in Sofia) is a Bulgarian sports journalist and radio host on the national Darik Radio.

Grancharov was born on April 15, 1963, year in Sofia. He started practising journalism in the early 1990s, as a major work affects sports journalism. He worked in the version of the national sports daily "Sport" from the year 1995 onwards.

In 1996 he became part of the most popular sports radio show GONG, where he worked with Tomislav Roussev, Nikolai Alexandrov and others.
