= Lyutvi Mestan =

Bulgarian politician (born 1960)

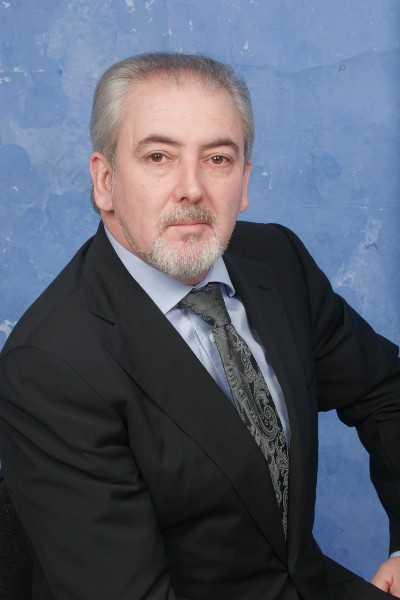

Leader of the Movement for Rights and Freedoms
- In office 19 January 2013 – 24 December 2015
- Preceded by: Ahmed Dogan
- Succeeded by: Mustafa Karadayi

Personal details
- Born: December 24, 1960 (age 65) Chorbadzhiysko, Bulgaria
- Party: Bulgarian Communist Party (before 1990) Union of Democratic Forces (1990-1993) Movement for Rights and Freedoms (1993–2015)(expelled) Independent (2015–2016) Democrats for Responsibility, Solidarity and Tolerance (2016–present)

Lyutvi Ahmed Mestan (Bulgarian: Лютви Ахмед Местан, Turkish: Lütfi Ahmed Mestan) (born 24 December 1960) is a Bulgarian politician of Turkish-Bulgarian origin. He was chairman of the Movement for Rights and Freedoms from January 2013 to 24 December 2015. He has been the Member of Parliament for Kardzhali. He was removed as party leader by the DPS central council and expelled from the party for what it considered an excessively pro-Turkish government stance following the downing of a Russian bomber jet by the Turkish Air Force. He subsequently founded a new political force, DOST, acronym of Democrats for Responsibility, Solidarity and Tolerance in Bulgarian, and a double entendre also signifying friend in Turkish. The party is based on pro-EU, pro-NATO and liberal opinions.

== European Court of Human Rights (2013-2023) ==
In 2013, Mestan participated in the election campaigns throughout the country, including in the Sliven village of Yablanovo, whose inhabitants are mostly of Turkish origin and speak Turkish. Since Mestan used Turkish for 7 minutes during his speech, he was soon fined by the Sliven regional governor, Marin Kavrakov, with 2,000 lv. The Constitution of the Republic of Bulgaria specifies that an election campaign must be conducted in the Bulgarian language.

According to Kavrakov, the fine is high because speaking a language other than Bulgarian during the election campaigns brings public danger.

The mayor of the village of Yablanovo, Dzhemal Choban, was also fined 3,000 lv for using Turkish during an election campaign (2,000 lv) and using public resources for the DPS party's election campaign (1000 lv)

Speaking in Turkish during the election campaign was widely discussed in the Bulgarian media.

Soon after, the case was transferred to the European Court of Human Rights in Strasbourg. The Bulgarian Helsinki Committee also helped Mestan. In 2023, the court found Bulgaria guilty and the country was forced to pay 1,200 euros in compensation to Mestan and 3,200 euros in costs in the case.

According to the European Court of Human Rights, the Bulgarian Electoral Code violates the right to expression by completely prohibiting the use of unofficial language. The court also emphasizes that Turkish is both the mother tongue of Mestan and 98% of the inhabitants of the village of Yablanovo, and some of them were not even fluent in Bulgarian. A similar ban on the use of an unofficial language exists only in Bulgaria and Ukraine out of all 37 members of the Council of Europe.
