= Democrats for Responsibility, Solidarity and Tolerance =

Bulgarian political party

Democrats for Responsibility, Solidarity and Tolerance Демократи за отговорност, свобода и толерантност
- Abbreviation: DOST
- Leader: Taner Alimolla
- Founder: Lyutvi Mestan
- Founded: 10 April 2016
- Split from: Movement for Rights and Freedoms
- Headquarters: 26-30th Building, Bacho Kiro St., Sofia
- Youth wing: Youth Movement DOST
- Ideology: Liberalism; Turkish minority interests Pro-Europeanism
- Political position: Centre
- Colours: Blue; Yellow
- National Assembly: 0 / 240
- European Parliament: 0 / 17
- Municipalities: 0 / 265

Website
- dost.bg

Democrats for Responsibility, Solidarity and Tolerance (DOST; Bulgarian: Демократи за отговорност, свобода и толерантност, romanized: Demokrati otgovornost, svoboda i tolerantnost, Turkish: Sorumluluk, Özgürlük ve Hoşgörü için Demokratlar) is a liberal and centrist political party in Bulgaria, mainly representing the Turkish minority. The party is led by Lyutvi Mestan.

Mestan, a long-time politician and member of the National Assembly of Bulgaria representing Kardzhali, served as chairman of the Movement for Rights and Freedoms (DPS), the main Turkish party in Bulgaria, from January 2013 to 24 December 2015. He was removed as party leader by the DPS central council and expelled from the party for what was considered an excessively pro-Turkish government stance following the downing of a Russian bomber jet by the Turkish Air Force.

Mestan and his followers within the DPS subsequently founded DOST.

In the 2017 parliamentary election the party obtained 2.9% of the vote (21.6% in Kardzhali) and no seat as it failed to meet the 4% electoral threshold.

== Election results ==
=== National Assembly ===
| Election | Leader | Votes | % | Seats | +/– | Government |
|---|---|---|---|---|---|---|
| 2017 (Note: Run as part of the Association DOST coalition (DOST, NPSD and NDPS).) | Lyutvi Mestan | 100,479 | 2.86 (#8) | 0 / 240 | New | Extra-parliamentary |
| Apr 2021 | Did not contest | | | 0 / 240 | 0 | Extra-parliamentary |
| Jul 2021 | Did not contest | | | 0 / 240 | 0 | Extra-parliamentary |
| Nov 2021 | Did not contest | | | 0 / 240 | 0 | Extra-parliamentary |
| 2022 | Did not contest | | | 0 / 240 | 0 | Extra-parliamentary |
| 2023 | Did not contest | | | 0 / 240 | 0 | Extra-parliamentary |
| Jun 2024 | Did not contest | | | 0 / 240 | 0 | Extra-parliamentary |
| Oct 2024 | Taner Alimolla | 2,260 | 0.09 (#21) | 0 / 240 | 0 | Extra-parliamentary |
