= Chorbadzhiysko =

Chorbadzhiysko Чорбаджийско
- Village
- Location within Bulgaria
- Coordinates: 41.4000°N 25.4000°E
- Country: Bulgaria
- Province: Kardzhali Province
- Municipality: Kirkovo
- Time zone: UTC+2 (EET)
  - Summer (DST): UTC+3 (EEST)

Chorbadzhiysko (Bulgarian: Чорбаджийско, Turkish: Çorbacılar Köyü) is a village in Kirkovo Municipality, Kardzhali Province, southern Bulgaria. Its name, derived from Turkish, means "village of the soupmakers".
