= Vasil Garnizov =

Bulgarian anthropologist and political scientist

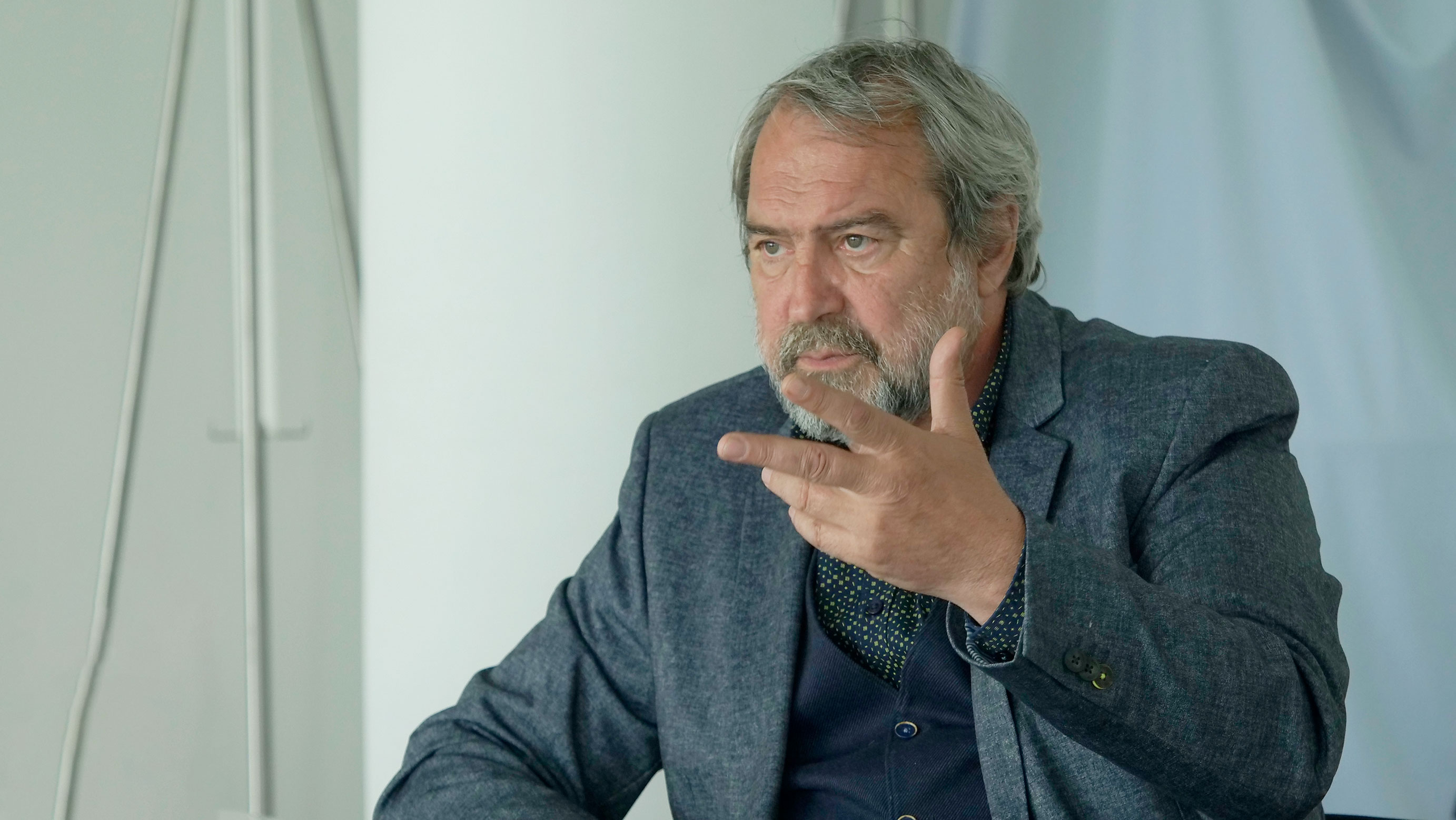
- Vasil Garnizov at a meeting of the Academic Council of the New Bulgarian University, 2021
- Born: 1 September 1958 (age 67); Sofia, Bulgaria
- Education: Sofia University "St. Kliment Ohridski" (MA)
- Awards: Ordre des Palmes académiques
- Scientific career
- Fields: Social anthropology
- Workplaces: New Bulgarian University
- Doctoral advisor: Todor Iv. Zhivkov

Vasil Garnizov is a Bulgarian anthropologist and political scientist.

Vasil Garnizov is one of the founders of the New Bulgarian University, secretary of the Society for New Bulgarian University, initiator of the establishment of the Department of Anthropology and a lecturer in the department since its inception. He is a member of the Board of Trustees of the University.

In the period 1999-2001 he was Deputy Minister of Regional Development and Public Works of the Republic of Bulgaria. Vasil Garnizov has held numerous expert advisory posts and has written widely for the Bulgarian press.

He is the recipient of Ordre des Palmes académiques (Order of Academic Palms), an order of merit established in 1955.

== Biography ==
=== Education ===
Vasil Garnizov was born on the 1 September 1958 in Sofia. He graduated Sofia University with a Master's degree in Bulgarian Philology in 1983. After completing his higher education, he was briefly a teacher at a secondary school in Yablanitsa.

He defended his doctorate in 1995 at the Institute of Folklore with the Bulgarian Academy of Sciences with a dissertation on “Death and Funeral for the Bulgarians”. He deals with the subject of photography and anthropology, as well as with the applied aspects of anthropology – local development, regional development, urban development, political culture, economic culture and health culture – including migration and health.

=== Academic career ===
After his defense, Vasil undertook a post-doctoral specialisations in “Social anthropology” at the School for Advanced Studies in the Social Sciences (French: École des hautes études en sciences sociales; also known as EHESS) in 1993, in the “Socio-Anthropological Methods in Social Sciences” at the Institute of Sociology with the Bulgarian Academy of Science (1994), and “New Information Technologies in Social Sciences” in French National Centre for Scientific Research (French: Centre national de la recherche scientifique, CNRS) (1996).

He was also a Research Fellow at the Institute of Folklore with the Bulgarian Academy of Sciences (1983-1984). Research Associate in the “Theory of Folklore” at the Institute of Folklore with the Bulgarian Academy of Sciences (2001-2003).

Since 2001 he has been Associate Professor of Anthropology at the New Bulgarian University he holds bachelor, master and doctoral courses in programs of the departments “Anthropology”, “Political Science”, “Cinema, Advertising and Showbusiness” and others.

=== Administrative career ===
Between 1997 and 1999, he first held the post of Chief Secretary in the Ministry of Regional Development and Public Works and then Director General at the National Centre for Regional Development. In the period 1999-2001 he was Deputy Minister of Regional Development and Public Works of the Republic of Bulgaria. Between 2004 and 2009, he was an Expert in the Parliamentary Committee on Regional Development, Local Authorities, and Public Works for the Bulgarian Parliament.

=== Memberships ===
He has worked in the Folklore Theory Department of the Institute of Folklore.

He is a member of the International Pragmatics Association in Amsterdam, the Association of Europeans in Brussels, the Council of Europe's Local and Regional Authorities Steering Committee, the Interdepartmental National Council on Ethnic and Demographic Issues The Council of Ministers, the Program Council of the Bulgarian National Television.

== Research contributions ==
In his dissertation on “Death and the funeral for Bulgarians” Vasil studies the theme of the horror of death in the everyday. He conducted more than a hundred interviews on funeral traditions in more than ten villages in north-western Bulgaria. His first field work was conducted in 1979.

Vasil Garnizov together with Petko Stainov and Angel Angelov introduces the concept of ‘ethnopragmatism’ during the international conference “Models of knowing” in Varna in September 1988.

He develops the study of pragmatism in the research on funerals.

In the beginning of the 90s he conducted field work in Romania.

In mid-90s he published a study on the Bulgarian pomacs, in which he argues that they are not a homogeneous group and identifies three subgroups. He also highlights that the identity of each group is defined by the groups, which surround it.

He also researches the cultural resistance against the political and economic transition in Bulgaria after 1989.

In the 1990s together with Asen Balakchiev they create the first course in Anthropology in Bulgaria. He then contributes to the first bachelors, masters and doctoral programmes in Anthropology in Bulgaria as well. He is the founder of the first and only department of Anthropology in Bulgaria.

He is among the founders of New Bulgarian University, together with Petko Stainov and Dimitar Dochev.

After 1989 he introduces the concept of the anthropology of the political (political anthropology) among the Bulgarian research community, as well as anthropology of the economy (economic anthropology) and medical anthropology. Together with Dr. Mihaylova-Garnizova they are the first to study the health profile of immigrants in Bulgaria.

He also studies ecological attitudes of the population and the ways in which culture contributes and hinders to the protection of the environment.

He insists on continuous academic reflection and discussion on the methods in the study of Anthropology.

== Photographic exhibitions ==
- 2013 – Independent exhibition “Between Anthropology and Photojournalism. Reports from Eagle Bridge” – Sofia
- 2013 – Participation in the collective photo exhibition “The World Seen Through the Lens of Scientists” – European Researchers Night, Sofia
- 2013 – Participation in the collective photo exhibition “NBU's Expedition to Crete and Santorini”, Sofia
- 2014 – Participation in the collective photo exhibition “Canon – Photo of the Year, Bulgaria 2013” – with a photo shoot of 12 photos from Ukraine
- 2014 – Independent photo exhibition with Lyudmil Hristov “Across Borders” – Exhibition Hall of the Chamber of Commerce and Industry in Sofia, Rectorate of the Thracian University of Edirne and Gallery in Thessaloniki
- 2015 – Independent exhibition “Diversity without borders“ – European Parliament in Brussels
- 2015 – Participation in the collective photo exhibition “The World Seen through the Lens of Scientists” – European Researchers Night, Sofia – with a photo shoot on the theme “Prayer – the Language of Jerusalem”
- 2016 – Participation in the collective exhibition “Geometry of the naked body” – Sofia, event of the Month of Photography program, Exhibition Hall “Industrial”
- 2017 – Independent photo exhibition “One day at CERN” – Sofia, NBU
- 2018 – Participation in the international exhibition “Sea in Yuzina – to keep Coral 2018”, Sofia, exhibition gallery Yuzina – photos and video installation.
- 2018 – Participation in the collective exhibition “Rediscovering Heritage” – Sofia, Ruse, Sliven, Gabrovo
- 2018 – Participation in the Black and White Thematic Exhibition, NBU Museum
- 2018 – 60 Years in 60 Photos: Anniversary Photo Exhibition of Vasil Garnizov, NBU, December 2018
- 2019 – “Rediscovering Heritage”, in collaboration with Ludmil Hristov, Ethnographic Museum, Plovdiv: the exhibition that opens the events “Plovdiv – European Capital of Culture”. The exhibition has been shown in Rousse and Sliven.
- 2019 – Participation in the international exhibition “Let's keep Coral 2018”, Barcelona, ArtHostel – photos and video installation.

== Bibliography ==
=== Textbooks, Books, Manuals ===
- Garnizov V., V. Marinov, G. Georgiev. Assessment of the Capacity of Non-Governmental Organizations and Businesses to Participate in the Absorption of the EU Structural and Cohesion Funds. Sofia, UNDP, April 2006. (Bulg. With summary in English) (www.undp.bg)
- Assessment of Municipal and District Capacities for Participation in EU Structural and Cohesion Funds Absorption. Sofia, UNDP, July 2006. (in Bulgarian with summary in English)
- Stanev, I., Y. Burer-Tavanie, V. Marinov, V. Garnizov, D. Malhasian. Bulgaria National Human Development Report 2006. Are we prepared for European Union funds? Challenges and opportunities for local development actors. Sofia, December 2006.

=== Selected articles ===
- Garnizov V. Politics, Reform and Everyday life. In: Politics, Reform & Daily Life. Transition papers. 1. Sofia, CSP, NBU, CLS, 1995, p. 6-23.
- Garnizov V. The transition of the mind. In: Bulgaria in transition: three viewpoints. Transition papers. 3. Sofia, CSP, 1996, p. 48-64.
- Garnizov V. The violence, nostalgia and guilt. In: Government and people. Sofia, CSP, 1998, pp. 76–101.
- Garnizov V (Ed.) Coalition’s attitude and local elections (ed.) Sofia, CSP, 1996
- Garnizov V. Group at Fieldwork, Fieldwork in the group – Anthropological Studies, v. IV, 2003, pp. 171–192
- Garnizov V. Economic Growth and Social Optimism: notes on research methodologies - Anthropological Studies, v. V, 2004, pp. 191–219
- Garnizov V. Medical Services and Health Culture - Anthropological Studies, v. VI, New Bulgarian University, 2005
- Garnizov V. Bulgarian National Project and Bulgarian Folklore Studies in 21st Century – Problems of Bulgarian Folklore, v. 10, Bulgarian Academy of Sciences, 2005, pp. 50–59
- Garnizov V. Corruption in Higher Education as Practice and Representation – Anti-Corruption, Anti-Education, Sofia, Ass. For Social Studies, 2005, pp. 86, 2005, 86-100)
- Garnizov V. The Minority of Intolerance and the Radical Change – Politiki 12/6, OSI, Sofia, 2006
- Garnizov V. The Debate between Folklorists and Ethnographers in Bulgaria (1975 - 1985) – In: Studying people in the people’s democracies, Studying Peoples in the People's Democracies II. Socialist Era Anthropology in South-East Europe. Vintilă Mihăilescu, Ilia Iliev and Slobodan Naumović (eds.), Berlin: LIT-Verlag, 2008, pp. 171–188.
- Bastian Lange, Marc Pradel Miquel and Vassil Garnizov. New Governance, New Geographic Scales, New Institutional Settings. In: Making Competitive Cities. Sako Musterd and Alan Murie (eds.); Oxford: Wiley-Blackwell; 2010. ISBN 978-1-4051-9415-0; 360 p.
- Garnizov V. La révolte des étudiants et l’occupation de l’Université de Sofia: La topographie – lieux et acteurs. – Divinatio, Studia culturologica series, v. 37, spring – summer 2013, MSHS, Sofia, p. 158-168.
- Garnizov V. Le printemps bulgare en images. – Divinatio, Studia culturologica series, v. 37, spring – summer 2013, MSHS, Sofia, p. 169-176.
- Garnizov V, I. Nachev, L. Stefanov. Civil society between protest and policies. Sofia, CSP, 2014, 55 p.
- Garnizov V. Notes on protests in Bulgaria. Interpretative model. In. E. Baruch (Ed.) The Protesters: Fact and Fiction. NBU, Sofia, 2016, pp. 125–132.
- R. Mihaylova-Garnizova, V. Garnizov. Refugee Crisis As a Potential Threat to Public Health. In: Defence Against Bioterrorism, NATO Science for Peace and Security Series A: Chemistry and Biology, Springer, 2018, pp. 25–42
