= Confederation of Labour Podkrepa =

Trade union centre in Bulgaria

Podkrepa
- Confederation of Labour Podkrepa
- Founded: 8 February 1989
- Headquarters: Sofia, Bulgaria
- Location: Bulgaria
- Members: 150,000
- Key people: Dimitar Manolov, president Konstantin Trenchev, former president
- Affiliations: ITUC, ETUC
- Website: www.podkrepa.org

The Confederation of Labour Podkrepa is a trade union centre in Bulgaria. It was founded on 8 February 1989 and has a membership of approximately 150,000 individuals.

It is affiliated with the International Trade Union Confederation and the European Trade Union Confederation. In Bulgarian, its full name is Конфедерация на труда „Подкрепа“, which is commonly shortened to КТ Подкрепа (KT Podkrepa [ˈka ˈtɛ potˈkrɛpɐ]).

== History ==
=== Foundation and Union rivalry ===
Podkrepa was founded in 1989 as an anti-establishment labour movement by a group of dissidents, led by Konstantin Trenchev. Initially the labour union took a right-wing, anti-communist stance, aligning itself with other anti-communist labour unions such as the Polish Solidarity and American AFL-CIO. As such, it became close to the opposition SDS and DPS movements and eventually became a full member of the rightist SDS, once it became a legally registered organization.

Around the same time, a competing trade union, the Confederation of Independent Trade Unions of Bulgaria (CITUB), was formed by a reorganization of the pro-government socialist-era union centres and became affiliated with the Bulgarian Socialist Party, the political heir to the country's Communist Party and primary rival of the SDS.

Podkrepa subsequently organized strikes (which were later joined in by CITUB for separate reasons) and contributed to the pressure that eventually caused Andrey Lukanov to resign.

A rivalry between the two unions was nevertheless quickly forged, in which Podkrepa would emerge the loser, its membership dwarfed by the CITUB at a ratio of nearly 10:1.

=== Ideological pivot ===
For its stances and actions, Podkrepa was criticised for its right-wing stance and its membership in the SDS, which led Trenchev to somewhat disassociate Podkrepa from the country's right-wing and downgrade its status within the SDS from a full member to that of an observer.

The union faced somewhat of an identity crisis in the 1990s, both as the transition from socialism to Western-style free market capitalism had degraded certain workers' rights and social benefits that Podkrepa had claimed to champion, and as Trenchev found himself at odds with SDS leadership, going as far as to dub SDS leader Ivan Kostov "scum".

Some of the more hard-line members left and formed different trade unions, such as "Promyana", a movement which sought to take the socialists down from power. However, these splinter movements proved unpopular and ineffective, fading into irrelevance relatively quickly. In the subsequent development of the trade union system in the country, CITUB solidified its role as Bulgaria's leading syndicate, consistently beating out Podkrepa in membership numbers through the years. With the remaining movements side-lined, CITUB and Podkrepa were earmarked as the only two nationally representative unions by the Bulgarian government.

=== Reconciliation ===
With Podkrepa having moved away from its rightist roots, it reconciled with CITUB and came to openly cooperate with the Socialist-led government elected in 2005, which it continued to support through to 2009. By this point, Podkrepa had cut all ties to the SDS and refused to endorse its candidate for the 2006 Bulgarian presidential election.

In 2011, Trenchev was pressured by the union's members to resign, but Podkrepa did not accept candidacies for his replacement and as such he remained at the head of the organization. He resigned, citing union members' demands, four years later in 2015, subsequently leaving Podkrepa entirely. This happened amidst a growing stagnation and decline in the labour union movement in general, with membership in labour unions declining from the nearly 100% of workers during the socialist era down to 15.4% in 2016. He was replaced by Dimitar Manolov, who won the leadership election with 476 from a total of 733 votes. However, he also came under criticism for being a member of the board of directors of the Burgas water company, with members questioning whether he would support labour or business interests.

Other members of the original anti-communist era also left the union, attempting to form other small unions, such as the "Defense Syndicate". The unions subsequently criticised each other, with a senior Podkrepa figure stating that they were "people that never moved their ass to go to a protest" and compared a proposed increase in overtime in Bulgaria to measures to policies taken by Viktor Orbán in Hungary.

By this point the union had changed so much since its foundation, that a new generation of leading figures such as Podkrepa's Economics Expert and MEP candidate Vanya Grigorova defined herself as leftist and viewed the government as rightist. A senior member of the union, alongside Grigorova, also became one of the lead organizers of the 2020–2021 Bulgarian protests against the right-wing GERB-United Patriots-SDS government, despite the fact that the union's head still did not support the protest movement.
