= Edvin Sugarev =

Bulgarian poet and politician

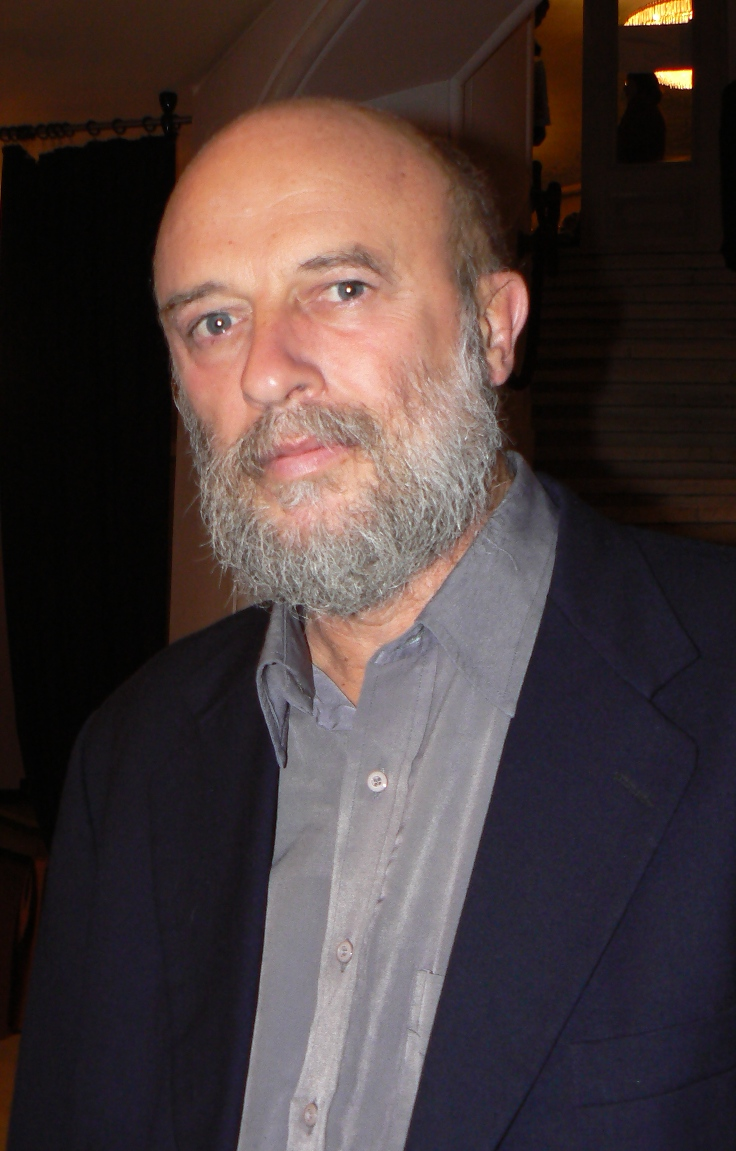

Personal details
- Born: 27 December 1953 (age 72) Sofia, Bulgaria
- Party: Union of Democratic Forces
- Profession: Poet, Politician

Edvin Sugarev (Bulgarian: Едвин Сугарев), (born 27 December 1953) in Sofia, is a Bulgarian poet and politician. He graduated from Sofia University in 1979. He was one of the founders of the first democratic movement in Bulgaria, "Ecoglasnost" and later appointed ambassador to India and Mongolia. He is a former member of the national coordination committee of the Union of Democratic Forces.

Edvin Sugarev was elected to the Bulgarian Parliament (Great National Assembly) in 1991.
