= Momchil Nekov =

Bulgarian politician

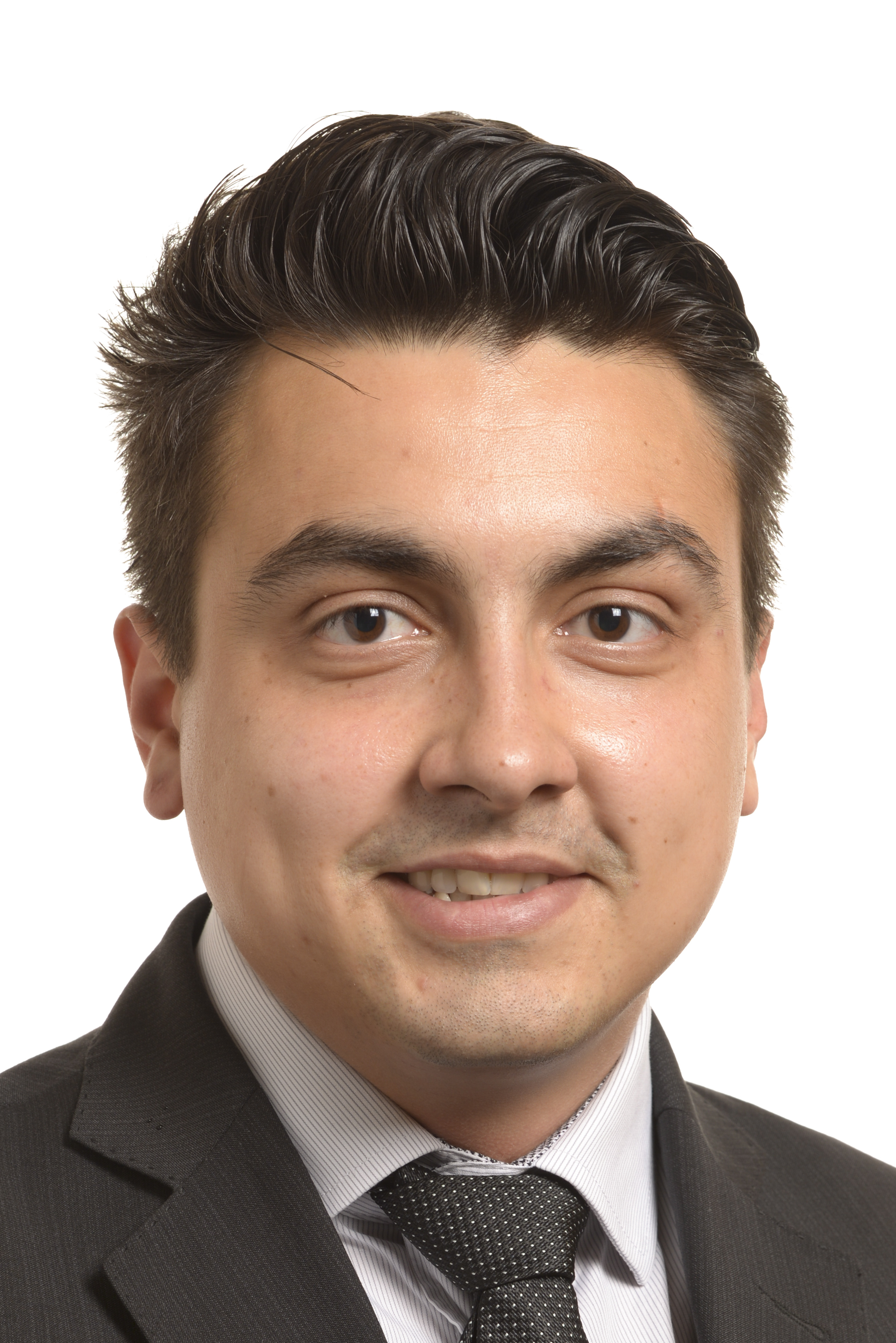

Member of the European Parliament
- In office 1 July 2014 – 1 July 2019
- Constituency: Bulgaria

Personal details
- Born: 13 May 1986 (age 39) Silistra, People's Republic of Bulgaria
- Party: Bulgarian Socialist Party
- Occupation: Politician

Momchil Nekov (Bulgarian: Момчил Неков) is a Bulgarian politician, who, in period 2014 — 2019, was a Member of the European Parliament, representing Bulgaria. He is a member of the Bulgarian Socialist Party. Deputy Minister of Agriculture in the government of Kiril Petkov.

== Parliamentary service ==
- Member, Committee on Culture and Education
- Member, Delegation for relations with the People's Republic of China
