= Konstantin Trenchev =

Bulgarian physician and syndicalist (1955–2026)

- Константин Тренчев

Personal details
- Born: 8 February 1955 Stara Zagora, Bulgaria
- Died: 6 November 2026 (aged 71)
- Profession: Physician, syndicalist

Konstantin Trenchev (Bulgarian: Константин Тренчев; 8 February 1955 – 6 November 2026) was a Bulgarian physician and syndicalist who was the president of the Confederation of Labour Podkrepa (CLP) from 1989 to 2015.

== Life and career ==
Trenchev received his education in the field of medicine. He supported the use of European Union funds to help firms and individuals in being granted patents.

He was one of the founding members of the Union of Democratic Forces and a member of the Coordinating Council of the UDF. He established CLP in February 1989, was reelected as its chairman in February 1997 and was persuaded to continue in this role at the CLP's 8th congress held in February 2011.

Trenchev resigned in 2015 and kept the title of Honorary president until his death.

Konstantin Trenchev died on 6 November 2026, at the age of 71.
