= Darik Radio =

Bulgaria
- Frequencies: FM: 105.0 MHz MHz (Sofia); DAB

Programming
- Format: News and talk

Ownership
- Owner: Radosvet Krumov Radev

History
- First air date: 21 January 1993

Links
- Website: Official website

Darik Radio is a Bulgarian radio station, specializing in news and comments from Bulgaria. It was launched at 12 am on 21 January 1993. Darik Radio is the biggest private radio station in Bulgaria. It has an extensive network of correspondents in nearly 20 countries in Europe and North America. A recent poll showed that Darik Radio is the preferred station among city-dwellers and middle-class people.

== History ==
Initially Darik Radio was broadcast from the capital Sofia and was heard only by a small fraction of the population. It quickly gained popularity due to its focus on news. In 1994 the radio started a scheme to become the first private radio station in Bulgaria. In the years that followed, Darik Radio opened numerous offices in other cities and covered the nation with its transmitters. The story of Darik Radio is one of success. After bitter legal fights with other competing radio stations Darik Radio achieved its ultimate goal - it was licensed as the first private national radio in Bulgaria and it stays so to this day. The project cost nearly $1,000,000. The radio is available online and via Intelsat satellite.

== Popular shows ==
The radio has news bulletins every half-hour.

- "The week" - sums up major event in the country every Saturday evening
- "Gong" - sports coverage
- "Wallet" - news from the world of business
- "Darik cafė" - every morning, reading newspapers, different live interviews, comments, weather forecast.
