= Bulgarian Helsinki Committee =

- Founded: 1992
- Type: Non-profit NGO
- Purpose: Human rights activism
- Location: Sofia, Bulgaria
- Region served: Bulgaria
- Product: non profit human rights advocacy
- Website: www.bghelsinki.org

The Bulgarian Helsinki Committee (Bulgarian: Български хелзинкски комитет, romanized: Bŭlgarski khelzinkski komitet) is an independent non-governmental organization for human rights founded on July 14, 1992 in Sofia, Bulgaria. Its main objectives are protection and promotion of human rights in Bulgaria. With more than 30 associates, the Bulgarian Helsinki Committee is the largest human rights watchdog in the country.

== History ==
In 1975, the Helsinki Final Act was signed by a number of nations, including nearly all European nations, in Helsinki, Finland. Beginning in 1976, a number of dissident Helsinki watchdog groups formed throughout the nations of the Eastern Bloc. In 1982, the International Helsinki Federation was founded to coordinate individual Helsinki committees.

The Bulgarian Helsinki Committee was founded on July 14, 1992 with a headquarters in Sofia, Bulgaria. The organization was a member of the Vienna-based International Helsinki Federation until the Federation's insolvency in 2007. Nowadays it is an independent organization. The Committee is registered with the Bulgarian Central registry of non-profit organization in the public benefit.

== Objectives ==
The Bulgarian Helsinki Committee's objectives are the protection and promotion with focus of the rights of minorities and vulnerable groups. The organization actively lobbies for legislative reforms in the field of human rights; it is actively involved in public debates on human rights issues and carries out advocacy for the protection of human rights. The Committee is also involved in human rights education, conference and workshop organization, public actions and other public activities with a focus on human rights.

== Structure ==
The Bulgarian Helsinki Committee is managed by two bodies: the General Meeting and Management Committees. The General Meeting is the supreme body of the organization and includes all members of the Committee (25 members as of early 2013). The Management Committee is appointed by the General Meeting, and it has executive functions.

== Programmes ==
The Bulgarian Helsinki Committee works through five programmes: Programming and administration, Legal Defence, Monitoring and research, Campaigns and communications and Legal protection of refugees and migrants.

The organization publishes a monthly magazine.

== Funding ==
The Committee is a nonprofit organization and is entirely funded by donations. In the recent years the largest donors have been public and private organizations, such as the Leon Levy Foundation, Open Society Foundations, Oak Foundation, United Nations High Commissioner for Refugees, European Union Fundamental Rights Agency, the European Commission, United States Agency for International Development.
