= Fundacja Reporterów =

Polish non-profit investigative journalism organisation

- Fundacja Reporterów
- Formation: 2010; 16 years ago
- Founders: Paweł Reszka, Wojciech Cieśla, Michał Majewski, Roman Daszczyński
- Type: Non-profit foundation
- Purpose: Investigative journalism
- Headquarters: Warsaw, Poland
- Region served: Poland; Central and Eastern Europe
- Chairman: Wojciech Cieśla
- Vice-chair: Anna Gielewska
- Affiliations: Organized Crime and Corruption Reporting Project; Global Investigative Journalism Network
- Website: frontstory.pl

Fundacja Reporterów (English: Reporters Foundation) is a Polish non-profit organisation dedicated to investigative journalism, based in Warsaw. Founded in 2010 by four Polish investigative reporters, it publishes the Polish-language investigative outlet FRONTSTORY.PL and the English-language regional platform VSquare, which covers Central and Eastern Europe. It describes itself as the first non-profit organisation in Poland focused entirely on independent, cross-border investigative journalism.

== History ==
The foundation was established in 2010 by the reporters Paweł Reszka, Wojciech Cieśla, Michał Majewski and Roman Daszczyński, who had worked for Polish publications including Gazeta Wyborcza, Rzeczpospolita and Newsweek Polska. Its initial aim was to support journalism in the Eastern Partnership countries, working with reporters from post-Soviet states such as Ukraine and Azerbaijan. According to Journalismfund Europe, some participants in its early programmes went on to work on projects such as YanukovychLeaks.

The founders later concluded that Poland itself needed stronger investigative journalism, and the foundation shifted its focus to Poland and the Visegrád Group region. Its activities have included training young investigative journalists, helping reporters obtain grants, and running cross-border investigations into corruption and organised crime.

== Publications ==
=== VSquare ===
In 2017 the foundation launched VSquare, an English-language platform for long-form, cross-border investigative reporting on Central and Eastern Europe, with a focus on the Visegrád countries – Poland, Hungary, the Czech Republic and Slovakia. Its name comes from "V4", an abbreviation for the Visegrád Group. Initial support for the project came from the National Endowment for Democracy. VSquare works with partner outlets in the region, including Czech and Hungarian investigative newsrooms such as Átlátszó and Direkt36. Its editor-in-chief is Anna Gielewska, who is also vice-chair of the foundation.

=== FRONTSTORY.PL ===
In 2021 the foundation launched FRONTSTORY.PL, a data-driven investigative outlet for Polish readers. The outlet's editor-in-chief is Wojciech Cieśla, who also chairs the foundation. FRONTSTORY.PL does not carry advertising and its content is free to read; it has entered into a content-sharing partnership with the Polish news site OKO.press for joint investigations. The foundation's team combines traditional reporting with open-source intelligence (OSINT) tools and data analysis.

== Investigations ==
In November 2019 VSquare published "The operation 'Lame Rebellion'", a joint investigation by the foundation's Wojciech Cieśla and Konrad Szczygieł with Investigate Europe, into Cat@Net, which it described as the largest internet troll farm identified in Poland. The report examined who the operation worked for and how it ran disinformation campaigns on Facebook and Twitter.

In 2020–21 journalists from the foundation, working with OKO.press and Gazeta Wyborcza, investigated the Polish public relations agency R4S. Reporting by the foundation's Konrad Szczygieł and Wojciech Cieśla alleged that the agency had used a troll farm in an online campaign against a proposed sugar tax while working for Coca-Cola, after which Coca-Cola ended its cooperation with the agency. R4S partners responded with a criminal complaint and threatened civil lawsuits against the journalists, steps OKO.press described as a strategic lawsuit against public participation (SLAPP). The joint reporting with OKO.press was nominated for major Polish journalism awards.

In August 2024 FRONTSTORY.PL and VSquare published "Magnes z Putinem" ("The Putin Magnet"), an investigation into Pavel Rubtsov, a GRU officer who posed as the Spanish journalist Pablo González and built contacts among journalists in Warsaw before his arrest in Poland in 2022. The investigation won the Press Club Polska Jarosław Ziętara Award for investigative journalism in 2025.

The foundation's reporters have also taken part in international collaborative projects, including an OCCRP-coordinated investigation of 28 newsrooms into Pravfond, a Russian state foundation for "compatriots" abroad (2025), and a VSquare-coordinated investigation with The Insider, Re:Baltica, LRT and Delfi into the GRU's role in parcel explosions across Europe.

== Breakwater Festival ==
In 2026 the foundation organised the first edition of Breakwater. Word and Solidarity, an international journalism festival held from 24 to 27 September 2026 at the European Solidarity Centre in Gdańsk. Billed as the first festival bringing together journalists from Poland, the Nordic countries and Central and Eastern Europe, its programme of workshops, lectures and debates covered cross-border investigations, OSINT, artificial intelligence, disinformation, data journalism and exiled media. Foundation president Wojciech Cieśla explained that the name refers to a breakwater as the last barrier protecting a port from storms, likening quality journalism to a final defence against disinformation, censorship and government overreach. Partners included the Global Investigative Journalism Network, OCCRP, Correctiv and Re:Baltica, with funding from sources including EEA Grants, Fritt Ord, Civitates, Journalismfund Europe and the European Endowment for Democracy.

== Affiliations ==
Fundacja Reporterów is a member of the Global Investigative Journalism Network and the Polish partner of the Organized Crime and Corruption Reporting Project (OCCRP). It has received support from Journalismfund Europe for cross-border projects. It is registered in Poland as a public benefit organisation (KRS 0000367130).

== See also ==
- Investigative journalism
- Media of Poland
- Organized Crime and Corruption Reporting Project
