= Belarusian Investigative Center =

- Status: Active
- Founded: 2018
- Founder: Stanislau Ivashkevich
- Country of origin: Belarus
- Headquarters location: Warsaw, Poland
- Distribution: Online
- Official website: investigatebel.org/en

The Belarusian Investigative Center (BIC) is an independent media outlet from Belarus that operates in exile. The center offers five core types of content: investigative journalism, fact-checking, analytical reporting, news, and economic analysis.

== History ==
The Belarusian Investigative Center was established in 2018. The team of the center left Belarus in 2021 amid a crackdown on media outlets and the arrest of journalists by Belarusian authorities. Following a search of the BIC studio in Minsk, most of the team relocated abroad.

On June 29, 2021, the website of the BIC was blocked in Belarus.

In October 2022, the Minsk city prosecutor's office designated the information products of the Belarusian Investigative Center, as well as logos featuring the abbreviation "BIC" and the words "Belarusian Investigative Center," as "extremist materials."

In December 2022, the Belarusian Investigative Center joined the Global Investigative Journalism Network, and became a member center of the Organized Crime and Corruption Reporting Project.

On September 15, 2023, the Belarusian Supreme Court designated the Belarusian Investigative Center as an "extremist organization."

In late July 2024 it became known that several current and former BIC members were put on the wanted list.

In 2026, the BIC was designated as an extremist group in Belarus.

On April 2, 2026, in a show of the state-owned channel Capital TV, presenter Roman Protasevich leaked personal information on the founder of the Belarusian Investigative Center Stanislau Ivashkevich. Protasevich showed his private phone number and home address in Poland. As a result of that, YouTube blocked several state-owned channels.

== Investigations ==
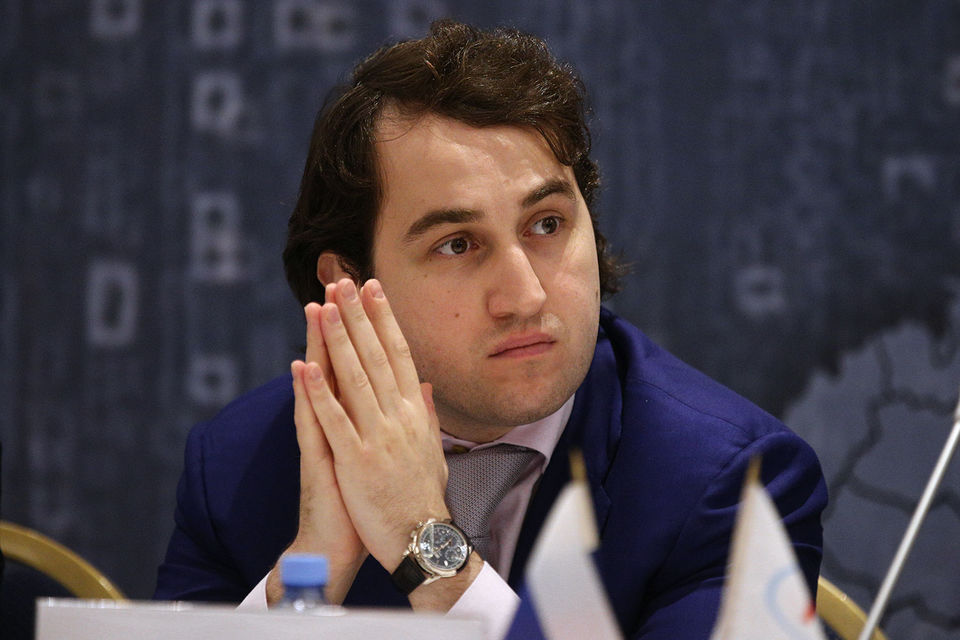
Russian businessman Said Gutseriev was a key figure in one of the most notable investigations by the BIC.

In January 2022, the Belarusian Investigative Center together with Re:Baltica, Delfi Estonia published an investigative report revealing a threefold increase in oil exports from Belarus to Estonia between 2020 and 2021. Consequently, on February 4, 2022, Estonia announced additional sanctions against Belarus, including the suspension of coal and oil transit.

Following a joint investigation by BIC and The Guardian, British authorities froze the London property of Said Gutseriev, valued at $200 million. Said Gutseriev is the son of Mikhail Gutseriev, a key financial supporter of Belarusian authoritarian leader Alexander Lukashenko.

In December 2022, Lithuanian businessman Saulius Girčys was expelled from his political party following an investigation by BIC, which revealed his involvement in the illegal sale of Belarusian timber to the EU via Kazakhstan and Kyrgyzstan.

After a joint investigation with the Lithuanian media outlet Siena into ways of circumventing sanctions against Grodno Azot, Lithuania seized Belarusian fertilizers worth millions of euros and strengthened border controls.

In November 2023, the Belarusian Investigative Center collaborated with the International Consortium of Investigative Journalists, Paper Trail Media, and 69 media partners, alongside over 270 journalists from 55 countries, to produce the "Cyprus Confidential" report. This investigation uncovered a financial network supporting Vladimir Putin's regime, primarily through connections in Cyprus. The report revealed that Cyprus has significant ties with high-ranking Kremlin figures, some of whom have been sanctioned.

GWithin 24 hours of the investigation's release, government officials, including Cyprus President Nikos Christodoulides and European lawmakers, responded by calling for reforms and initiating probes into the findings.

The BIC has also conducted investigations into numerous Belarusian companies and high-profile individuals, including Belaruskali, BelAZ, Belshina, Dana Holdings, Grodno Azot, Integral, Monolith, KBBV, Irina Abelskaya, Aliaksei Aleksin, Yury Chyzh, Petro Dyminskyi, Mikhail Gutseriev, Aliaksandr Shakutsin, Viktor Sheiman, Pavel Topuzidis, Siarhei Tsiatsieryn, Mikalai Varabei and Aleksandr Zaitsev. The BIC has also investigated Nicos Anastasiades' family business links to Belarus, the Belarus–EU migration crisis, the abductions of the Ukrainian children a Russian filtration camp for Ukrainians in Belarus,, the Russian looting of Ukrainian grain, including Belarusian involvement in it, and defense supplies to Russia by Belarusian companies.

Some of the BIC's investigations have been conducted in collaboration with OCCRP, ICIJ, C4ADS, Community of Railway Workers of Belarus, Cyber Partisans, KibOrg News, Belsat TV, Public Broadcasting of Latvia, Radio Liberty, Yle and local media outlets, such as 15min, Armando.Info, Der Standard, Gazeta Wyborcza, Heimildin, iStories, Kloop, L'Espresso, Paper Trail Media, Re:Baltica, Rzeczpospolita, Süddeutsche Zeitung, The Guardian, ZDF or TV3.

== Programs ==
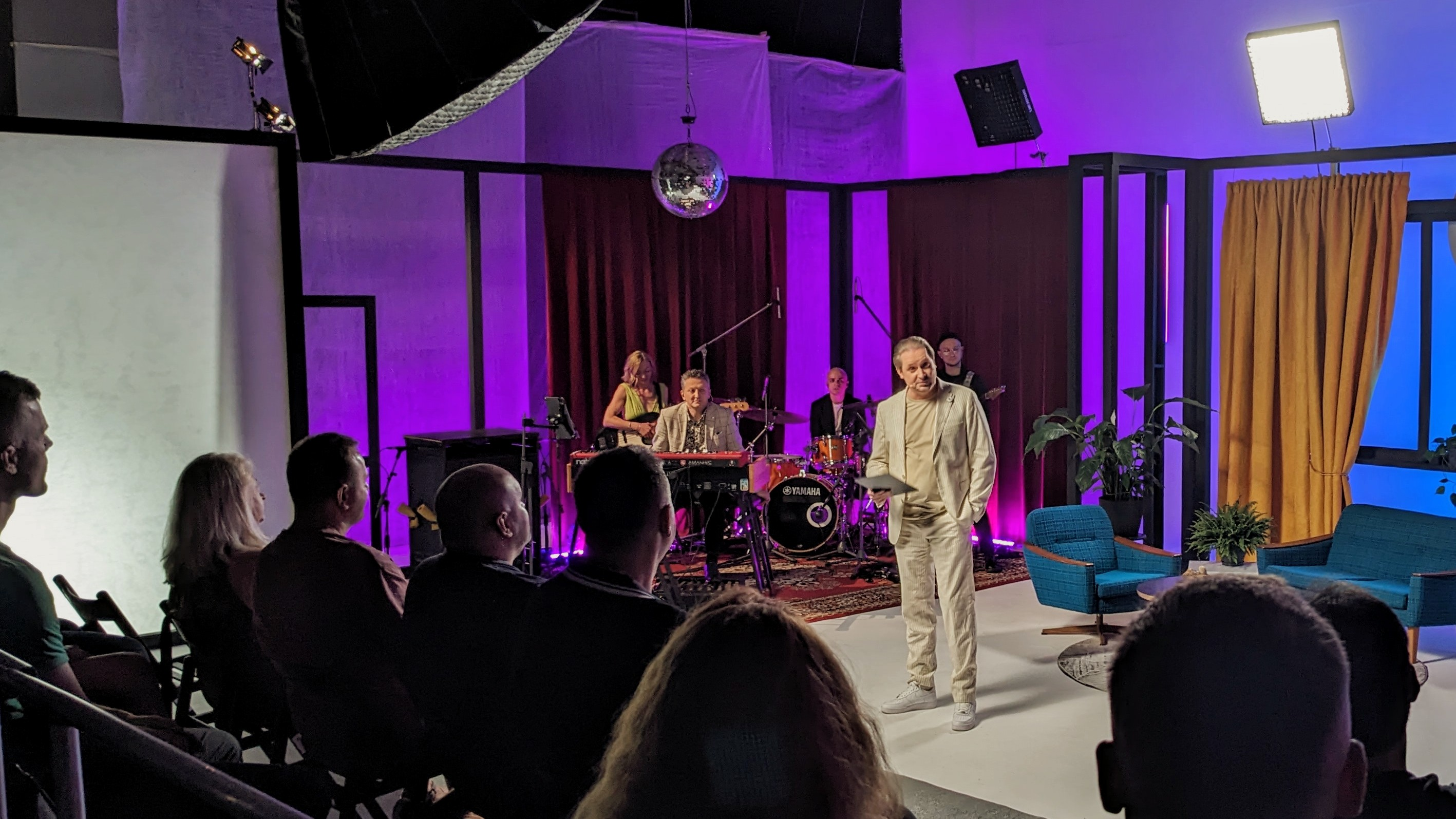
Filming of the "Late Night with Chaly" show by BIC.

The Belarusian Investigative Center produces several notable video programs, including "News with Chaly" and "Chaly: Economics." Their show "Weekly Top Fake" stands out for its dedication to debunking fake news in Belarusian and Russian media.

== Awards ==
In 2025, the Belarusian Investigative Center was co-awarded the Free Media Awards.

Journalists from the Belarusian Investigative Center have been honored with the national "Free Word" award from the Belarusian Association of Journalists multiple times. At the "Free Word" awards in 2021, the BIC team also secured first place in the Analytics category.
