= Aliaksei Aleksin =

Belarusian businessman

Aliaksei Ivanavich Aleksin (Belarusian: Аляксей Іванавіч Алексін; Aleksey Ivanovich Oleksin, Russian: Алексей Иванович Олексин) is a Belarusian businessman (petrochemical wholesaler and tobacco tycoon), who is closely associated with Belarusian president Alexander Lukashenko.

== International sanctions ==
In summer 2021, the European Union, USA, Canada and Switzerland imposed sanctions on Aleksin as a "wallet" of Lukashenko.

In 2022, Aleksin, Bremino Group and NNK were added to the sanctions lists of Ukraine and Japan, while Inter-Tobacco, Inna Aleksina and Vitaly Aleksin (Aliaksei Aleksin's wife and son, respectively) were blacklisted by Canada, whereas Vitaly and his brother Dzmitry Aleksin were sanctioned by the European Union and Switzerland.

In August 2023, the United States added Inna, Vital and Dzmitry Aleksin to the Specially Designated Nationals and Blocked Persons List.

== Biography ==
The early life of Aleksin is almost unknown. He graduated from the Lomonosov aerial technical military academy as a helicopter technician, then he graduated from Novosibirsk State Academy of Water Transport.

According to Intelligence Online, in 2022, Alexey Aleksin and his youngest son Vitaly received Vanuatu passports.

== Career ==
Aleksin worked in the Belvneshtorginvest company, which is owned by the Presidential administration of Belarus. His first steps in business are unknown. It was speculated that in Belvneshtorginvest Aleksin oversaw petrochemicals exports carried by Yury Chyzh. After Chyzh was included in EU's travel ban list, Aleksin became the nominal owner of his petrochemical wholesale companies (Energo Oil, Belneftegaz, Neonafta).

After Yury Chyzh fell into disgrace, Aleksin was reported to become an associate of senator and businessman Alexander Shakutin.

== Assets and controversies ==
According to a 2021 journalistic investigation, Aleksin and Aliaksandr Zaitsau received residence permits in Lithuania in 2012 and opened several companies there. Although these companies operated without significant business activity and without staff, more than 46 million euros were processed through their accounts. According to the same investigators, citing data from the Cyber Partisans, a few months after receiving tobacco preferences in 2018, Aleksin donated nine cars and motorcycles worth a total of $1.7 million to the Presidential Security Service.

In 2019, Ezhednevnik magazine put Aleksin on 4th place in its top-200 of Belarusian wealthy and influential businessmen. His main assets are SZAO Energo Oil and ODO Belneftegaz. As of 2015, he owned 60% of these companies directly, and 40% was owned by his wife Inna. In 2021, Aleksin has transferred his share to his sons, junior Vitaly and senior Dzmitry.

In 2015, Aleksin bought 98.97% of Cyprus-based parent company of Belarusian bank MTB (MTBank) from two American and Belarusian investment companies. As of 1 October 2020, MTBank's assets were Br 1,497,800,000 (US$590 million). In 2021, Aleksin sold MTBank's parent company to Dubai-based Stoneva Limited allegedly owned by Lebanese-born Romeo Abdo, but European banks suspected this deal to be a fictitious sale and asked the new owner to clarify it.

In 2020, it was speculated that Aleksin has left petrochemicals wholesale business and set focus on tobacco market.

According to Euroradio, Aleksin's family owned nearly quarter of Synesis Group, an IT company which is under EU sanctions because of close collaboration with Lukashenko's regime.

According to the journalistic investigation of the Buro, some assets of the Aleksin family were transferred to Victoria Gubanova, the wife of his son Dmitry, after the latter was included in the EU sanctions list.

=== Logistics ===
As of 2019 Aleksin owned nearly one third of Bremino Group (with Mikalai Varabei and Aliaksandr Zaitsau), which operated several logistics complexes and a special economic zone in Orsha district, created by Lukashenko's decree. Belarusian economist Jaroslav Romanchuk called Bremino projects a business of elites, establishment and siloviki. Romanchuk also suggested that these businessmen will turn into business oligarchs.

=== Tobacco ===
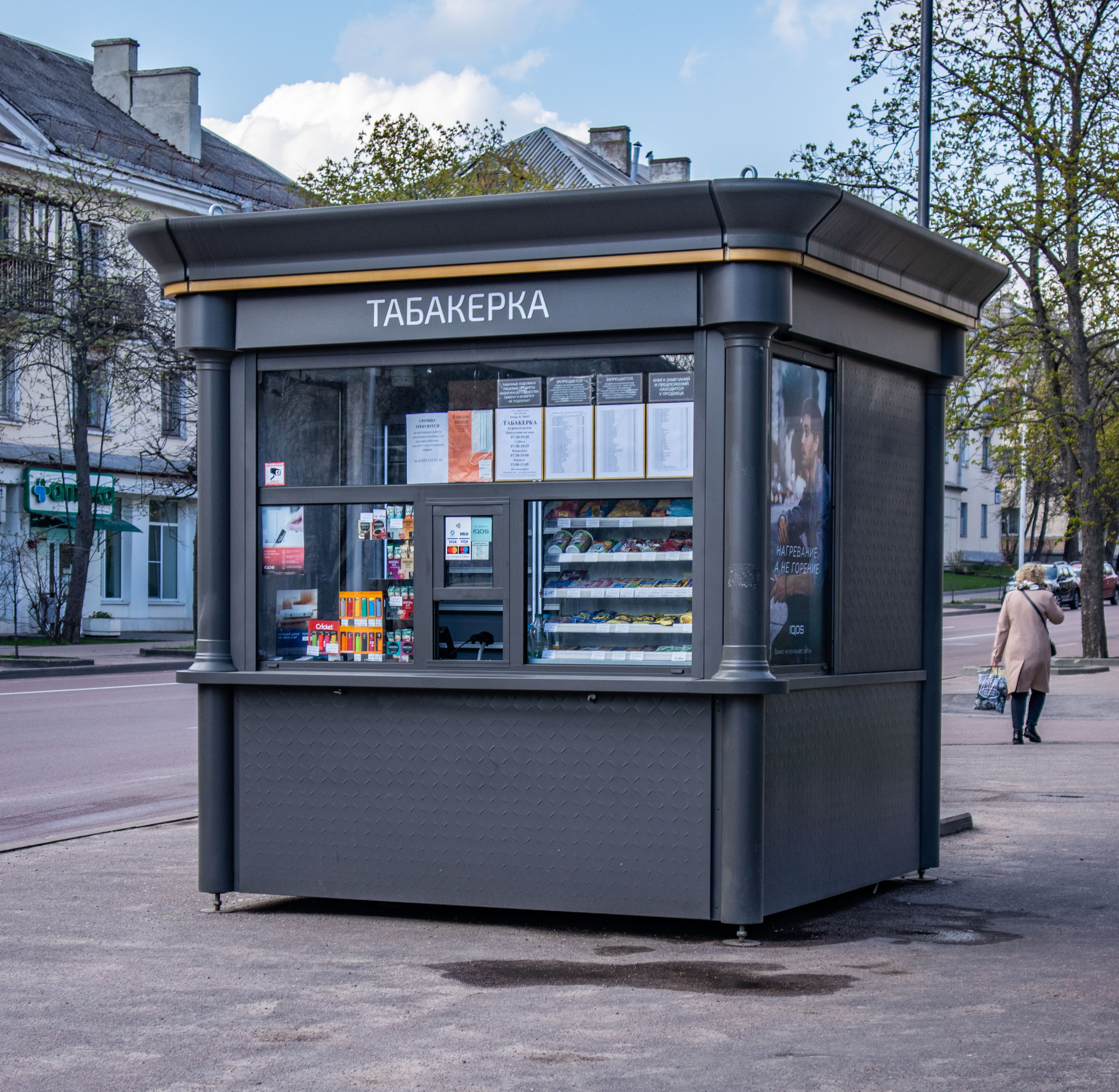
"Tabakerka" cigarettes stand on a bus stop in Minsk

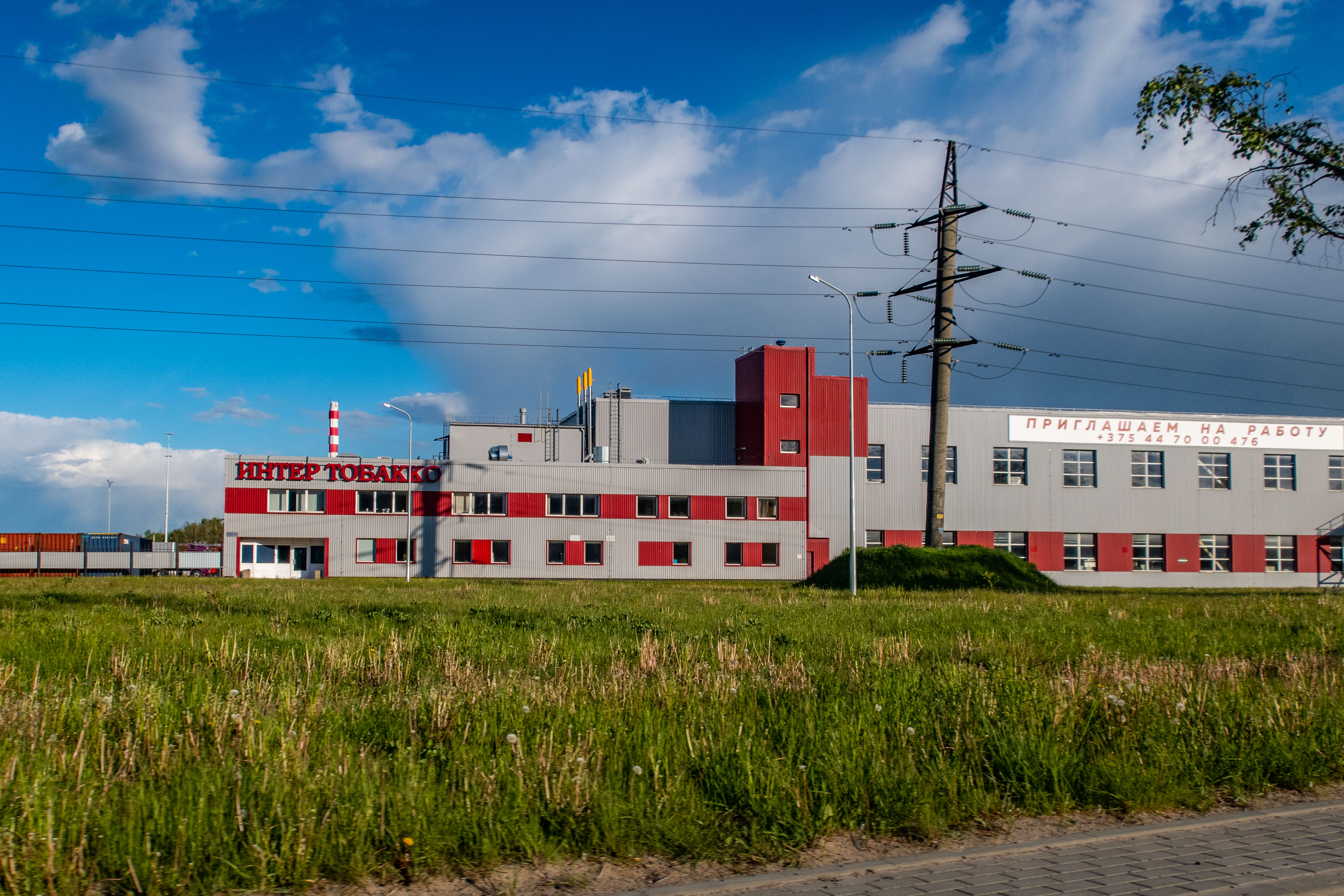
Inter-Tobacco cigarettes factory near Minsk

In 2017–2018, Aleksin's Energo Oil company entered Belarusian tobacco market with help of Lukashenko (later Aleksin created Inter-Tobacco company to manage these projects). He got a special permission of Lukashenko to import cigarettes, while previously only one state-owned company had such permission. Later his companies became the exclusive wholesale and retail operators of the state-owned Grodno tobacco factory; they also got a special permission to import tobacco blends to make cigarettes. Aleksin also started to build new tobacco factory in Minsk.

Mass installation of new cigarettes stands "Tabakerka" (Tobacco box) by Aleksin's companies became a major public controversy. In different Belarusian cities people signed a number of petitions to remove these stands or at least install them far from hospitals, schools and other public facilities. The association of entrepreneurs "Perspective" called on authorities to treat small businesses equally as Aleksin's company: they claimed that local authorities in Minsk previously removed private stands from streets, while Aleksin did not face a similar problem.

In 2020, Russian journalist Tina Kandelaki called to stop cigarettes smuggling to Russia, claiming Aleksin to be one of the main figures of the "Belarusian tobacco mafia".

On 16 February 2021, Alexander Lukashenko granted monopoly on imports of IQOS (heated tobacco product) to Aleksin's Energo Oil.

In 2021 Foreign Policy magazine claimed that Aleksin is one of the main alleged organizers of cigarette smuggling to the European Union.

=== Other assets ===
In 2014, Aleksin bought a meat processing plant in Maladzyechna from Yury Chyzh.

Aleksin's ODO Belneftegaz owns 74.95% of IT-company OOO Synesis Stigma, which was reported to be affiliated with Synesis Group. On 17 December 2020, the Council of the European Union imposed sanctions on Synesis Group.

Aleksin and his family also have some assets in Latvia (Latgales Alus D brewery, and Mamas D company).

=== Suisse Secrets ===
Aleksin was mentioned in the Suisse Secrets data leak in February 2022. According to the investigation made by OCCRP and journalists, Aleksin had a large corporate bank account (CHF 36 million) in the Swiss-based Credit Suisse. a 40% share in parent companies Energo Oil and Belneftegaz.

In 2012, his son Dmitry became an owner of 40% of at least 2 former companies of Chyzh in Latvia (Mamas D and Latgales Alus D).

=== Dubai leaks ===
In June 2022, Belarusian Investigative Center revealed that Aliaksei Aleksin has an apartment on the man-made island of Palm Jumeirah in the UAE, and his son Dzmitry has a villa there.

=== Worldclear files ===
According to a joint investigation by OCCRP, the Belarusian Investigative Center, 15min, and Expressen, published in 2026, files from financial services provider Worldclear contain suspicious transactions made by Aleksin through Worldclear and a Vanuatu bank, purportedly as loan repayments.
