= Russian theft of Ukrainian grain =

During the ongoing Russo-Ukrainian War, which began in 2014 with the illegal annexation of Crimea by the Russian Federation and the War in Donbas (2014—2022), and expanded with the full-scale Russian invasion of Ukraine since 24 February 2022, Russian troops in the occupied regions of Ukraine have systematically stolen grain and other products from local farmers. As of May 2022, at least 400,000 tons of grain were stolen and exported from Russian-occupied Ukraine according to the Ukrainian Ministry of Defence, with the Ministry of Agrarian Policy and Food of Ukraine similarly estimating a theft of 'several hundred thousand tonnes' of grain at the end of April 2022.

== War in Donbas period 2014–2022 ==
From 2014 until 2022, grain from the self-proclaimed Donetsk People's Republic and the Luhansk People's Republic came to Russia. According to the BBC, intermediaries transported grain from Donbas farmers to Russia, passed through customs, everything was paid for by bank transfer, through Russian banks. The grain was unloaded at the warehouses of Russian buyers, and they were already selling grain as Russian.

== Full-scale invasion period since 2022 ==
A June 2022 study by the Kyiv School of Economics found that the Russian invasion cost Ukraine's agricultural sector $4.3 billion in destroyed equipment, damaged land and unharvested crops.

As of October 2022, the widescale theft of Ukrainian grain was continuing and involved both private companies and Russian state operatives. Some of the stolen grain is transferred and mixed with legitimate goods. The Financial Times identified Nikita Busel, a Russian businessman and the general director of the government-run State Grain Operator, as one of the heads of the operation.

According to an investigation released in June 2024 by the Belarusian Investigative Center, the Schemes project of Radio Liberty's Ukrainian service, and Vyorstka, in 2023, agricultural products worth 6.2 million euros were exported from the occupied territory of the Kherson Oblast, and out of the 6.4 tons of wheat collected, two million tons were exported through Crimean ports. Some of this product was sold to Azerbaijan, Turkey, Iran, and Spain. According to another investigation by the BIC, Schemes, Cyber Partisans, and KibOrg, released in August 2024, rapeseed is being exported from the Kherson Oblast by people from Ramzan Kadyrov's entourage and their Belarusian business partners; documents were issued for the supply of 4.9 thousand tons of rapeseed to Belarus. According to another investigation by 15min, BIC, TV3, Schemes, Community of Railway Workers of Belarus, Cyber Partisans, and KibOrg, released in February 2025, oil from rapeseed exported to Belarus is supplied to the EU.

According to two journalistic investigations, a company linked to former Belarusian Interior Minister Uladzimir Navumau is involved in the export of Ukrainian grain from the occupied territories of Ukraine, including through Belarus.
