= Andy Sullivan =

Andy, Drew, or Andrew Sullivan may refer to:

- Andy Sullivan (baseball) (Andrew Raymond Sullivan, 1884–1920), Major League Baseball player
- Andy Sullivan (golfer) (Andrew Michael Sullivan, born 1987), English golfer
- Andrew Sullivan (Andrew Michael Sullivan, born 1963), British-American writer, editor and blogger
- Andrew Sullivan (politician), American politician in Wisconsin
- Drew Sullivan (Andrew Raymond Richard Sullivan, born 1980), British basketball player
- Andi Sullivan (Andi Maureen Sullivan, born 1995), American soccer player
- Drew Sullivan (journalist), American investigative journalist on organized crime
