= Szabolcs Panyi =

Hungarian investigative journalist

- Panyi Szabolcs
- Occupation: Investigative journalist
- Employer(s): VSquare; Direkt36
- Known for: Reporting on Russian influence in Hungary; Pegasus Project
- Awards: CPJ International Press Freedom Award (2026)

Szabolcs Panyi Hungarian: Panyi Szabolcs is a Hungarian investigative journalist who reports on national security, intelligence and Russian influence in Central Europe. He writes for the Hungarian outlet Direkt36 and for VSquare, a Central European investigative platform run by the Polish Fundacja Reporterów. In 2021, his phone was found to have been infected with the Pegasus spyware, and in March 2026 the Hungarian government accused him of spying.

== Career ==
According to the Committee to Protect Journalists (CPJ), Panyi joined Direkt36 after the takeover of his previous outlet by people close to the government, and in 2017 he helped launch VSquare. He writes VSquare's newsletter on Central Europe, "Goulash".

== Pegasus Project ==
In 2021, Panyi worked on the Pegasus Project, an international investigation into leaked phone numbers selected for surveillance with spyware made by Israel's NSO Group. He found his own number on the list. He was one of five Hungarian journalists confirmed as targets. CPJ says the spyware was deployed by Hungarian authorities while he was working on a series of national security investigations. Panyi also reported that Hungary had spent at least €6 million of public money on buying Pegasus in 2017 and 2018. Direkt36 published its first story on Hungarian targets on 18 July 2021. In 2022, Hungary's data protection authority (NAIH) opened a separate investigation into Panyi himself.

== Reporting on Russian influence ==
With VSquare and other Central European outlets, Panyi co-wrote an investigation based on phone conversations between Hungarian Foreign Minister Péter Szijjártó and Russian Foreign Minister Sergey Lavrov. It reported that Hungary had acted on the Kremlin's behalf, working to remove Russian oligarchs and their relatives from EU sanctions lists and passing EU documents to Moscow.

== Espionage accusation ==
On 26 March 2026, ahead of the 12 April 2026 parliamentary election, Gergely Gulyás, chief of staff to Prime Minister Viktor Orbán, announced that the government had filed criminal charges against Panyi. He accused Panyi of spying "in cooperation with a foreign state" and of helping to intercept communications between Szijjártó and Russian officials. Government-aligned media broadcast an edited secret recording of Panyi speaking to a source about confirming a phone number used by Szijjártó. Panyi denied the allegations and stood by his reporting. VSquare described the accusations as a smear campaign meant to discredit his findings. Press freedom groups in the Media Freedom Rapid Response condemned the charges as politically motivated, and CPJ called for them to be dropped.

== Awards ==
CPJ gave Panyi one of its International Press Freedom Awards in 2026.
