= Bivol.bg =

Bulgarian investigative media

- Type: Investigative media
- Format: Website
- Owner: Assen Yordanov
- Editor-in-chief: Atanas Tchobanov
- Staff writers: Atanas Tchobanov, Dimitar Stoyanov, Vildan Bayryamova, Tatiana Christi, Nikolay Marchenko
- Language: Bulgarian; English; French; Russian
- Country: Bulgaria
- Website: www.bivol.bg

Bivol.bg, also known as Bivol, is an investigative media based in Bulgaria which is part of the Organized Crime and Corruption Reporting Project network and an official partner of WikiLeaks.

== Team ==
Its team comprises Atanas Tchobanov, Dimitar Stoyanov and Assen Yordanov. Tchobanov is a member of the executive committee of the Organized Crime and Corruption Reporting Project.

== Yaneva Gate ==
The European Commission has referred to one of Bivol's investigations known as Yaneva Gate in their 2016 report on Bulgaria under the Mechanism for Cooperation and Verification. This mechanism measures the country's progress in the area of corruption and judicial independence. In 2010, Assen Yordanov from Bivol.bg received a Leipzing Media Award, which is meant to "honor journalists, publishers, authors and institutions from all over the world who dedicate themselves to ensuring and developing the freedom of the press by demonstrating willingness to take risks, strong personal commitment, persistence, courage and democratic conviction." Yordanov was also nominated for an award by Reporters Without Borders in 2013. In 2019, Bivol's journalist Dimitar Stoyanov received the Axel Springer Award for investigative journalism together with a colleague from the RISE Project Romania.

== BIRD project ==
In 2020, Bivol journalists Atanas Tchobanov and Dimitar Stoyanov started the BIRD project, which stands for Bureau for Investigative Reporting and Data.

== Notable investigations ==
=== Yaneva Gate ===
In 2015, Bivol started publishing leaked recordings of conversations between two judges from the Sofia City Court, Rumyana Chenalova and Vladimira Yaneva, and the lawyer Momchil Mondeshki: the wiretaps were dubbed Yaneva Gate. The conversations allegedly show influence peddling, illegitimate pressure on the judiciary by Bulgaria's Prime Minister Boyko Borisov, media mogul and politician Delyan Peevski and General Prosecutor Sotir Tsatsarov, corruption, and moral degradation of the courts, including sex against career promotion. According to the Organized Crime and Corruption Reporting Project, "the wiretaps have once again raised questions about the judiciary’s practices, lack of separation of powers, and questionable adherence to rule of law." Yaneva Gate reached the European Commission which asked Bulgarian authorities to carry out an investigation. The President of Bulgaria's Supreme Court of Cassation Lozan Panov also publicly called for an independent investigation because Yaneva Gate "put a stain on the courts". However, Bulgaria's Prosecutor's Office and the Ethics Committee of the Supreme Judicial Council refused to investigate because they deemed the recordings were manipulated. By contrast, an independent examination by a foreign laboratory which Bivol contacted showed the recordings were authentic. One of the judges in the conversation confirmed the recordings were authentic too. Hristo Ivanov, Minister of Justice at the time, has referred to these recordings as а "mega corruption scandal." In principle, an investigation is difficult because of the vertical structure of Bulgaria's Prosecutor's Office, which means that the General Prosecutor has to investigate himself.

=== GP Gate ===
In 2018, Bivol.bg published their investigation known as GP Gate, which is a joint project with RISE Project Romania. Arguably, it "exposed a complex network of consultants, businessmen and public officials that evidence indicates feasted without public oversight on projects funded by the European Union." While working on their investigation in September 2018, journalist from Bivol Dimitar Stoyanov and Attila Biro from RISE Project Romania were detained by Bulgarian authorities. Initially the head of the Directorate for Combating Organized Crime Ivaylo Spiridonov denied that an arrest took place. Subsequently, the Court of Pernik established not only there was an arrest, but also that the detainment was illegal. In response to the arrest, the Organization for Security and Co-operation in Europe said it was concerned by the "verbal and physical intimidation" of the journalists by Bulgarian authorities. The Council of Europe also issued an alert and monitored the case. Reporters Without Borders publicly condemned the arrests.

=== Panama Papers in Bulgaria ===
In 2018, Bivol.bg gained access to the Panama Papers under an agreement with the International Consortium of Investigative Journalists and subsequently published a story about the offshore company Viafot which is attempting to acquire a key asset of Bulgaria's defense industry, namely the arms producer Dunarit. The Panama Papers show that Viafot is owned by Alexander Angelov who is the lawyer of media mogul Delyan Peevski. Previously, other Bulgarian media had reported how mysteriously all state institutions help Viafot acquire Dunarit through illegitimate means. However, the Prosecutor's Office has not started an inquiry.

=== Boyko Atanasov's Case ===
Bivol.bg have shed light on the corrupt practices of Bulgaria's Prosecutor's Office by interviewing investigator Boyko Atanasov. Atanasov was subjected to pressure because he exposed the existence of a special secret unit "directly subordinate to General Prosecutor Sotir Tsatsarov, Prime Minister Boyko Borisov and controversial businessman, media mogul and lawmaker Delyan Peevski." Atanasov claims the unit "deals with concealing crimes and tipoffs against people close to the government, and at the same time, uses signals and tipoffs to blackmail the inconvenient." Atanasov revealed that "the members of the special unit can’t pursue cases based on their own judgment, but must work according to Tsatsarov’s orders and instructions, otherwise they face salary reduction, disciplinary proceedings and work overload.” The Organized Crime and Corruption Reporting Project has reported that "Atanasov took a TV crew to show them trash containers at the Sofia Investigation Office filled with shredded business contracts and documents from interrogations, including the collapse of Corporate Commercial Bank, the fourth largest private lender in Bulgaria. He insisted that the documents were destroyed immediately after he gave his first interview to Bivol."

In 2019, Bivol interviewed a second investigator, Radiana Abdulova, who confirmed there was a special unit at the Prosecutor's Office which whitewashes politicians and attacks critics and opponents of the government.

=== Apartment Gate ===
In 2019, Bivol.bg contributed to shedding light on suspicious deals of Bulgaria's political and administrative elite in the so-called Apartment Gate scandal which reached international media such as The Financial Times. Bivol.bg reported on a suspicious transaction by the Deputy Chairman of the Committee for Combating Corruption Anton Slavchev (jurist) who failed to declare the full price of his apartments and a glass-paneled terrace of 244 square meters. They also reported that the Chairman of the Committee for Combatting Corruption Plamen Georgiev engaged in document fraud. Following the allegations, Georgiev went on leave, so that the circumstances of the case could be verified, which, in practice, means he will be investigated by his deputy Slavchev. Georgiev resigned in July 2019, but no consequences followed for his failure to declare his property.

Radio Free Europe Bulgaria reported that the girlfriend of Deputy General Prosecutor Ivan Geshev, Detelina Hancheva, with whom he has two daughters is in a business relationship with the main witness in a case in which Geshev is a prosecutor. His girlfriend has stakes in the construction sector. In August 2019, the prosecution confirmed the information was true, but refused to open an inquiry.

=== Piracy in Bulgarian Waters ===
In 2018, Bivol published their investigation describing how the Libyan tanker BADR was hijacked in Bulgarian waters by suspicious private enforcement agents with forged documents. Bivol assert this is an unprecedented pirate attack in the Black Sea which was facilitated by Bulgarian institutions.

=== Garbage Gate ===
In 2020, Bivol broke the story of how the Italian Mafia was exporting dangerous waste to Bulgaria, thus jeopardizing the health of Bulgarian citizens. In October 2020, Bivol warned that Hristo Kovachki continued to burn dangerous waste in the Bobovdol thermal electric power station despite concerns.

=== Illegal Logging Gate ===
In 2022, Bivol published a story on what it calls "the timber mafia" - corrupt networks engaging in illegal felling of trees which benefit from state protection.

=== Prosecutors' Party Gate ===
In 2022, Bivol published pictures and videos from a party of Bulgarian prosecutors and investigators held during working hours in one of the buildings of the prosecution. The party involved the consumption of alcohol during working hours in violation of the code of ethics of magistrates. Bivol claims many of the attendees went home by car driving under the influence of alcohol. They also used the story to shed light on the schemes employed by the prosecution to increase the salaries of prosecutors.

== Threats against their work ==
In 2019, Tchobanov complained that Bulgaria's Prosecutor's Office had issued a European Investigation Order against him - Tchobanov, who lives in France, argued that this was deliberate harassment by then General Prosecutor of Bulgaria Sotir Tsatsarov aimed at silencing him. In 2022, Yordanov revealed that there was an attempt on his life with the participation of a high-ranking prosecutor.

== See also ==
- Corruption in Bulgaria
- Organized Crime and Corruption Reporting Project
- WikiLeaks
