= Anna Gielewska =

Polish investigative journalist and editor

- Occupations: Investigative journalist, editor
- Employer: Fundacja Reporterów (Reporters Foundation)
- Known for: Co-founding VSquare and FRONTSTORY.PL; investigations into Russian influence operations and disinformation
- Notable work: Antoni Macierewicz. Biografia nieautoryzowana (2018, with Marcin Dzierżanowski)
- Title: Editor-in-chief of VSquare; vice-chair of Fundacja Reporterów
- Awards: Jarosław Ziętara Award for investigative journalism (2025)
- Website: VSquare author page

Anna Gielewska is a Polish investigative journalist and editor based in Warsaw. She is a co-founder and the editor-in-chief of VSquare, a cross-border investigative journalism platform covering Central Europe, and a co-founder of the Polish investigative outlet FRONTSTORY.PL. She is also vice-chair of Fundacja Reporterów (Reporters Foundation), a Warsaw-based non-profit investigative journalism organisation. Her reporting focuses on organised disinformation, propaganda, Russian influence operations and political power networks.

== Career ==
=== Political reporting ===
Gielewska began her career as a political reporter, writing for the Polish publications Rzeczpospolita, Dziennik Gazeta Prawna and the weekly Wprost. While at Wprost she was nominated in a journalism poll for her commentary and analysis of the Polish political scene. She has also trained journalists at the University of Warsaw.

In 2018, together with Wprost deputy editor-in-chief Marcin Dzierżanowski, she published Antoni Macierewicz. Biografia nieautoryzowana (Antoni Macierewicz: An Unauthorised Biography), published by Znak. The authors said the book was based on more than two years of archival research, including files of the Institute of National Remembrance and cables from the U.S. embassy, and on interviews with over a hundred people. Former defence minister Antoni Macierewicz criticised the book and announced he would sue its authors.

=== Stanford fellowship ===
In the 2019–20 academic year Gielewska was a Lyle and Corrine Nelson International Fellow of the John S. Knight Journalism Fellowships at Stanford University, where she worked on a project on countering organised disinformation.

=== Fundacja Reporterów, VSquare and FRONTSTORY.PL ===
Gielewska is vice-chair of Fundacja Reporterów, which was founded in 2010 by a group of Polish investigative journalists and describes itself as the first non-profit organisation in Poland dedicated to investigative journalism. The foundation publishes VSquare (in English, covering Central and Eastern Europe) and FRONTSTORY.PL (in Polish).

She co-founded VSquare, a network of investigative journalists from the Visegrád Group countries – Poland, Hungary, the Czech Republic and Slovakia – and serves as its editor-in-chief. She also co-founded FRONTSTORY.PL, a data-driven investigative outlet for Polish audiences launched by the foundation in 2021. Among other formats, she writes VSquare's regular newsletter Goulash, which covers politics, intelligence and Russian influence in Central Europe.

=== Notable investigations ===
In August 2024 Gielewska published "Magnes z Putinem" (English version: "The Putin Magnet: the GRU spy and the women who loved him") on FRONTSTORY.PL and VSquare, in collaboration with colleagues from FRONTSTORY.PL and The Insider. The investigation examined how Pavel Rubtsov, a GRU officer who posed as the Spanish journalist Pablo González, built contacts among journalists, foreign correspondents and activists in Warsaw before his arrest in Poland in February 2022. It reported that his Polish partner, also a journalist, had been charged as an accessory to espionage. The report prompted public responses from Polish media outlets that had published Rubtsov's work, including Tygodnik Powszechny. The investigation received the Press Club Polska Jarosław Ziętara Award for investigative journalism in 2025.

She also contributed, with FRONTSTORY.PL colleagues, to a cross-border investigation coordinated by VSquare with The Insider, Re:Baltica, LRT and Delfi into the GRU's role in a series of parcel explosions across Europe.

Gielewska has received support from Journalismfund Europe for cross-border investigative work. She has spoken at international journalism events including the International Symposium on Online Journalism (2020) and the Breakwater festival (2026).

== Awards and recognition ==
- 2025 – Jarosław Ziętara Award for investigative journalism (Press Club Polska), with her team, for "Magnes z Putinem"
- 2022 – Novinářská cena (Czech Journalism Award), according to her VSquare biography
- Shortlisted for the Grand Press award (2015, 2021, 2022)
- Shortlisted for the Daphne Caruana Galizia Prize for Journalism (2021, 2023)

== Selected works ==
- Dzierżanowski, Marcin; Gielewska, Anna (2018). Antoni Macierewicz. Biografia nieautoryzowana (in Polish). Kraków: Znak.
