= Drew Sullivan (journalist) =

American investigative journalist

- Sullivan at the 37th Annual ACFE Global Fraud Conference in 2026
- Education: Texas A&M University (BS)
- Occupations: Investigative journalist, editor, publisher
- Employers: Organized Crime and Corruption Reporting Project; Center for Investigative Reporting (CIN); Associated Press; The Tennessean; Rockwell International
- Known for: Co-founder of the Organized Crime and Corruption Reporting Project (OCCRP)
- Awards: Pulitzer Prize for Explanatory Reporting (2017); Skoll Award (2020); Global Shining Light Award (2007); Daniel Pearl Award; Tom Renner Award; European Press Prize (2015); Missouri Honor Medal (2023); Maria Ressa Prize (2025); ACFE Guardian Award (2026)

Drew Sullivan is an American investigative journalist, editor, and publisher.

He is the co-founder and publisher of the Organized Crime and Corruption Reporting Project (OCCRP), a global network of investigative reporting centers with over 150 staff members, 55 to 70 member centers, and publishing partners across six continents. Under Sullivan's leadership, OCCRP has won over 100 investigative journalism awards and published over 1,000 investigative reports which contributed to 778 legal indictments and the recovery of more than $11 billion in illicit funds.

Before starting OCCRP, he founded the Center for Investigative Reporting in Bosnia and Herzegovina (CIN) and co-founded the Journalism Development Network (JDN). Under his leadership, OCCRP has led major global investigations, including the Russian Asset Tracker, Dubai Unlocked, Suisse Secrets, and the Laundromat series, including Azerbaijani, Troika and Russian. OCCRP has contributed to the Panama Papers, the Paradise Papers, the Pandora Papers.

== Early life and education ==
Sullivan holds a degree in Aerospace Engineering from Texas A&M University. He also attended the Missouri School of Journalism masters program.

== Career ==
=== Early career ===
After completing his engineering degree, Sullivan joined Rockwell International in 1987 as an aerospace engineer. He spent six years working on the Space Shuttle project.

=== Transition to journalism ===
Sullivan entered journalism in the early 1990s as an investigative reporter for The Associated Press (AP) on its Special Assignment Team in New York, and later reported for The Tennessean in Nashville.

In 2000, Sullivan traveled to Sarajevo, Bosnia and Herzegovina to train journalists.

In 2003, he proposed the creation of a local investigative journalism organization to USAID. This led to the founding of the Center for Investigative Reporting (CIN) in Sarajevo in 2004. Sullivan served as its first director, editor, and board president.

In 2004, he established the Journalism Development Group (later reorganized as the non-profit Journalism Development Network) to manage funding for CIN and regional media initiatives.

While at CIN, Sullivan led a team of reporters investigating corruption by the Bosnian prime minister. Their findings contributed to the prime minister's indictment and resignation.

Sullivan has also worked as a professional stand-up comedian and actor, appearing in four films in Eastern Europe where he was cast as the "evil American."

=== Organized Crime and Corruption Reporting Project (OCCRP) ===
In 2006, Sullivan met Romanian journalist Paul Radu who was the co-founder of the Romanian Center for Investigative Journalism. Together, they began collaborating on cross-border investigations into regional energy traders. The investigation, titled The Power Brokers, won the inaugural Global Shining Light Award in 2007.

Recognizing the transnational nature of organized crime, Sullivan and Radu co-founded the Organized Crime and Corruption Reporting Project in 2007. Initially established in Sarajevo, OCCRP was created as a regional consortium of investigative centers across Eastern Europe and the Balkans. Initial funding included a $346,000 grant from the United Nations Democracy Fund (UNDEF) in April 2007.

In 2014, Sullivan became a Future for Good fellow at the Institute for the Future (IFTF) in Palo Alto, CA.

Sullivan served as OCCRP's editor-in-chief from its inception until March 2023, after which he continued as its publisher and co-director. Under Sullivan and Radu, OCCRP expanded into a global network encompassing over 150 staff members across 30 nations, 55 to 70 member centers, and dozens of publishing partners across six continents, with global headquarters in Amsterdam.

During his tenure, OCCRP developed Aleph (investigative database), an open-source investigative data platform hosting billions of entities and datasets used by thousands of journalists worldwide.

In addition to reporting, Sullivan served as co-executive producer for the 2022 documentary The Killing of a Journalist, detailing the 2018 murders of Slovak investigative reporter Ján Kuciak and his fiancée Martina Kušnírová.

=== Legal defense ===
To address legal harassment against journalists, Sullivan helped establish Reporters Shield in 2022 alongside the Cyrus R. Vance Center for International Justice. Announced at the International Anti-Corruption Conference with an initial $9 million contribution from USAID, Reporters Shield provides pre-publication review and legal defense funds for newsrooms facing Strategic Lawsuits Against Public Participation (SLAPPs).

=== Initiatives ===
In 2016, Sullivan established the Global Anti-Corruption Consortium (GACC) in partnership with Transparency International. It received funding from the U.S. government and other donors to support its missing of connecting investigative reporting with advocacy and legal action.

Floodlight was created by Sullivan, OCCRP Co-Founder Paul Radu, and the Gabo Foundation (Fundación Gabo) to connect investigative reporting with filmmakers for adaptation into films and television series.

In 2025/2026, Sullivan launched Revenue Axis in partnership with Report for the World to help independent newsrooms build sustainable revenue models.

== Awards and honors ==
- Global Shining Light Award (Multiple recipient: 2007, and subsequently)
- Daniel Pearl Award (Two-time recipient)
- Tom Renner Award for Crime Reporting (Two-time recipient)
- Online Journalism Award for Investigative Reporting (Multiple recipient)
- European Press Prize (Special Award, 2015)
- Pulitzer Prize for Explanatory Reporting (2017) – Awarded to ICIJ, OCCRP, and media partners for the Panama Papers.
- Skoll Award for Social Entrepreneurship (2020) – Co-recipient with Paul Radu.
- Missouri Honor Medal (2023)
- Maria Ressa Prize for Courage in Investigative Journalism (2025)
- Pulitzer Prize in Public Service (2025) – Finalist, for collaboration with The Boston Globe on Steward Health Care.
- ACFE Guardian Award (2026) – Co-recipient with Paul Radu, presented by the Association of Certified Fraud Examiners.
- Overseas Press Club Award
