= Stop the Wagons =

Russian anti-war movement

- Останови вагоны
- Leader: Decentralized leadership
- Founded: 2022
- Country: Russia
- Allegiance: Russian opposition
- Ideology: Anti-war movement
- Status: Active

Stop the Wagons (Russian: Останови вагоны, romanized: Ostanovi vagony) is a Russian anti-war movement that engaged in sabotaging Russian railways in various ways to prevent the transport of equipment, fuel, ammunition and other supplies to the war in Ukraine.

== History ==
The movement's website contains detailed instructions on sabotaging Russian supply lines and railways. On 8 May 2022, the Telegram channel of the movement was blocked. According to their own statements, they were blocked "after the publication of a map of railway resistance, which covered over 30% of the territory of Russia."

The movement claimed responsibility for an incident in the Amur Oblast on the Trans-Siberian Railway on 29 June 2022, for railcar derailment in Tver on 5 July, for derailing several railcars in Krasnoyarsk on 13 July, for freight trains in station Lesosibirsk from Krasnoyarsk Krai, in Makhachkala during the night of 23–24 July (local authorities, as main version, also consider sabotage), and on October Railway's Babaevo station on 12 August.

On 19 July 2022, the website of the movement was blocked by Roskomnadzor in Russia at the request of the Prosecutor General's Office.

== See also ==
- Community of Railway Workers of Belarus
