= Miranda Patrucic =

Investigative journalist

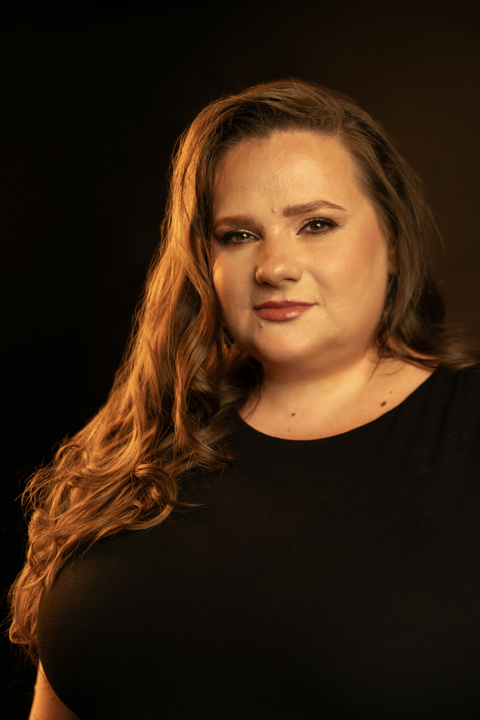
- Editor in Chief of OCCRP Miranda Patrucic
- Known for: Investigative journalism

Miranda Patrucic is an investigative journalist who has uncovered high-level corruption and financial crimes across Europe and Central Asia. She has exposed bribery schemes in Uzbekistan, Azerbaijan, and Montenegro, as well as other nations.

As of December 2025, Patrucic serves as editor in chief of OCCRP. In 2018, she developed a program in Central Asia to foster more open investigative journalism among the typically closed-off nations of Tajikistan, Uzbekistan, Turkmenistan, Kyrgyzstan, and Kazakhstan.

She is the recipient of several awards, including One World Media's International Journalist of the Year, the Knight International Journalism Award, the Global Shining Light Award, the IRE Tom Renner Award, the Daniel Pearl Award, and the European Press Prize.
