= Aliaksandr Shakutsin =

Belarusian businessman

Aliaksandr Vasilyevich Shakutsin
- Аляксандр Васільевіч Шакуцін
- Born: 12 January 1959 (age 67); Velikaye Babina , Orsha district, Byelorussian SSR, Soviet Union
- Education: Belarusian State Medical University
- Occupation: Businessman
- Known for: Oligarch operating major businesses with support from Belarusian president Alexander Lukashenko

Aliaksandr Shakutsin (Belarusian: Аляксандр Васільевіч Шакуцін; Russian: Александр Васильевич Шакутин, born 12 January 1959) is a Belarusian businessman, allegedly close to Belarusian president Alexander Lukashenko. Media widely characterize Shakutsin as an oligarch. On 17 December 2020, the Council of the European Union imposed sanctions on him.

== Early life ==
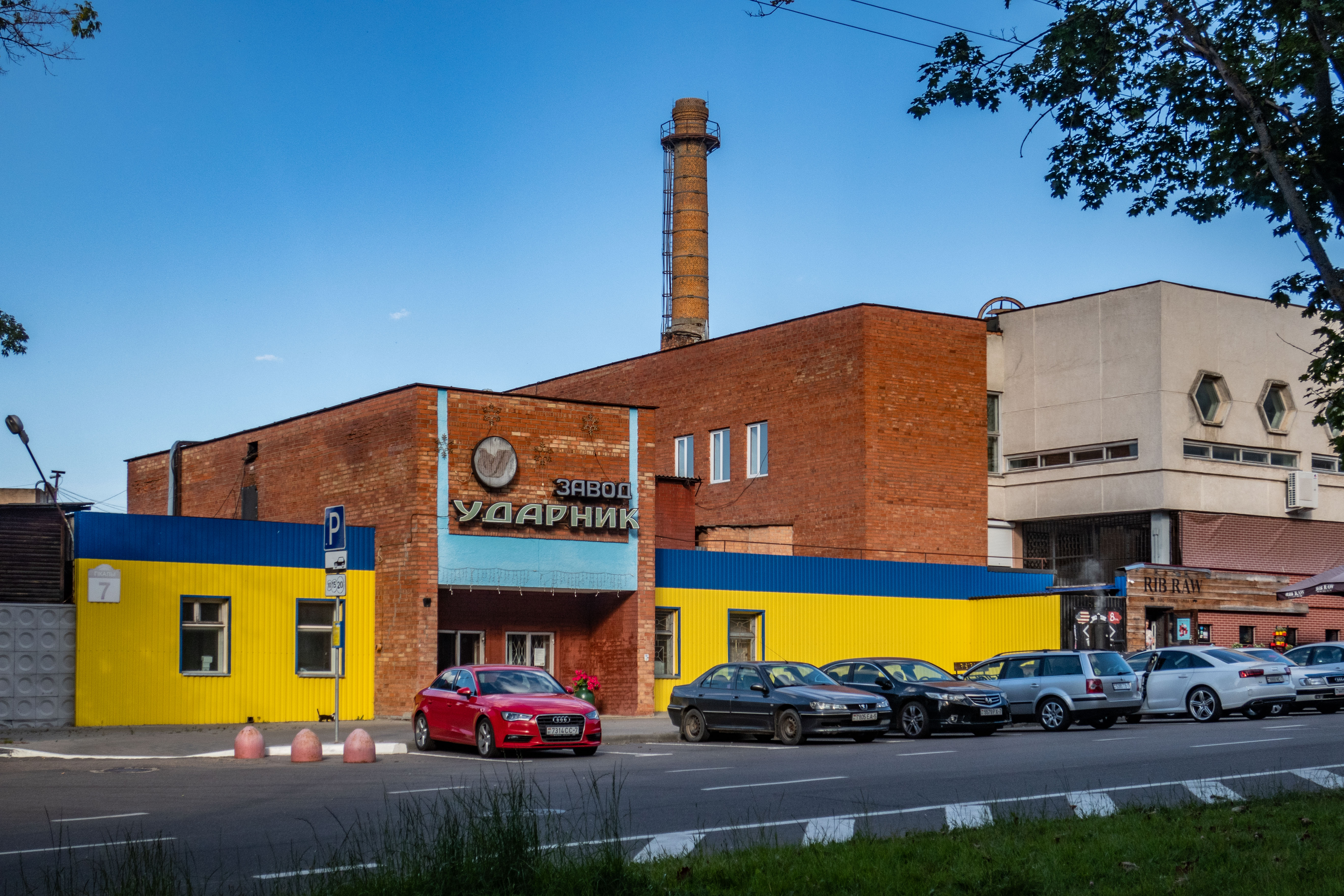
Udarnik factory in Minsk

Shakutsin graduated from the Belarusian State Medical University. He was a Soviet Komsomol activist, working in the central committee of LKSMB, the local Komsomol branch in the Belarusian SSR. In the early 1990s he headed the medical unit of Minsk Tractor Works (MTZ).

== Business career ==
In 1990s he created a trade company Prommedinvest with MTZ top manager Igor Subbotin and fellow Komsomol activist Yaroslav Buyalski. Prommedinvest supplied hospitals with medical equipment, but later the company expanded to other sectors of economy. In 2001—2002 Prommedinvest and a Nepali businessman Upendra Mahato bought the controlling stake in Amkodor (Амкодор) holding company, which was formed around Udarnik (Ударник) factory in Minsk. In the early 2010s Alexander Lukashenko sold several factories to Amkodor at a low price.

Shakutsin was one of the few businessmen who gained access to the export of petroleum production with his associate Mikalai Varabei via their Interservis (Интерсервис) company. Shakutsin's Spamash (Спамаш) owned 51% of Eksimoil (Эксимойл), which is also active in the export of petroleum products. Another petroleum products wholesaler Yury Chyzh was supposed to be a rival of Shakutsin among oligarchs close to Lukashenko.

In 2016, Shakutsin and Mikalai Varabei started to construct a major business and hotel complex in Minsk. Construction was carried out for Chinese credit (US$120 million) by Chinese CITIC. Shakutsin claimed that the loan terms were agreed to by Alexander Lukashenko and Xi Jinping personally.

In March 2026, the Belarusian Investigative Center released an investigation according to which, even after the de facto nationalization of Amkodor in 2025, Shakutsin retained control over some profitable assets associated with the holding.

== International sanctions ==
On 17 December 2020, the Council of the European Union imposed sanctions on both Varabei and Shakutsin (EU Regulation No 2020/2129). According to the regulation, Shakutsin was recognized as a person "who benefited most from the privatisation during Lukashenko’s tenure as President", "benefiting from and supporting the Lukashenka regime". Shakutsin claimed that the sanctions were imposed by mistake. Shakutsin was also sanctioned by the United Kingdom and Switzerland.

Logex (Логекс) company, owned by Shakutsin and his son Aliaksandr, was reported to be a major re-exporter of European and South American flowers to Russia, having indirect tax breaks in Belarus. On 21 June 2021, Logex was also sanctioned by the EU.

In 2022, Shakustin and Amkodor were blacklisted by Canada and Ukraine.

On December 5, 2023, the United States Department of the Treasury’s Office of Foreign Assets Control has added Shakutsin to its Specially Designated Nationals and Blocked Persons List.

=== Reactions ===
It was reported that in 2020 Shakutsin started to transfer some of his assets to his son.

According to a 2023 joint investigation by the Belarusian Investigative Center and Lithuania’s Siena, a company controlled by Shakutsin and his business partners functions in Germany despite the European sanctions against Shakutsin In the autumn of 2023, the Belarusian Investigative Center released two new investigations on the alleged circumvention of Western sanctions by Shakutin’s companies.

In June 2023, the European Court of Justice dismissed Shakutsin's request to lift the European Union sanctions against him.

== Political and cultural activities ==
In 2013, Shakutsin's companies financially supported his protege Alyona Lanskaya in the Eurovision 2013 song contest.

Shakutsin is an honorary consul of Bangladesh in Belarus.

Shakutsin was a member of the Council of the Republic, being indirectly elected in 2008 and in 2012.
