= Paul Radu =

Romanian journalist

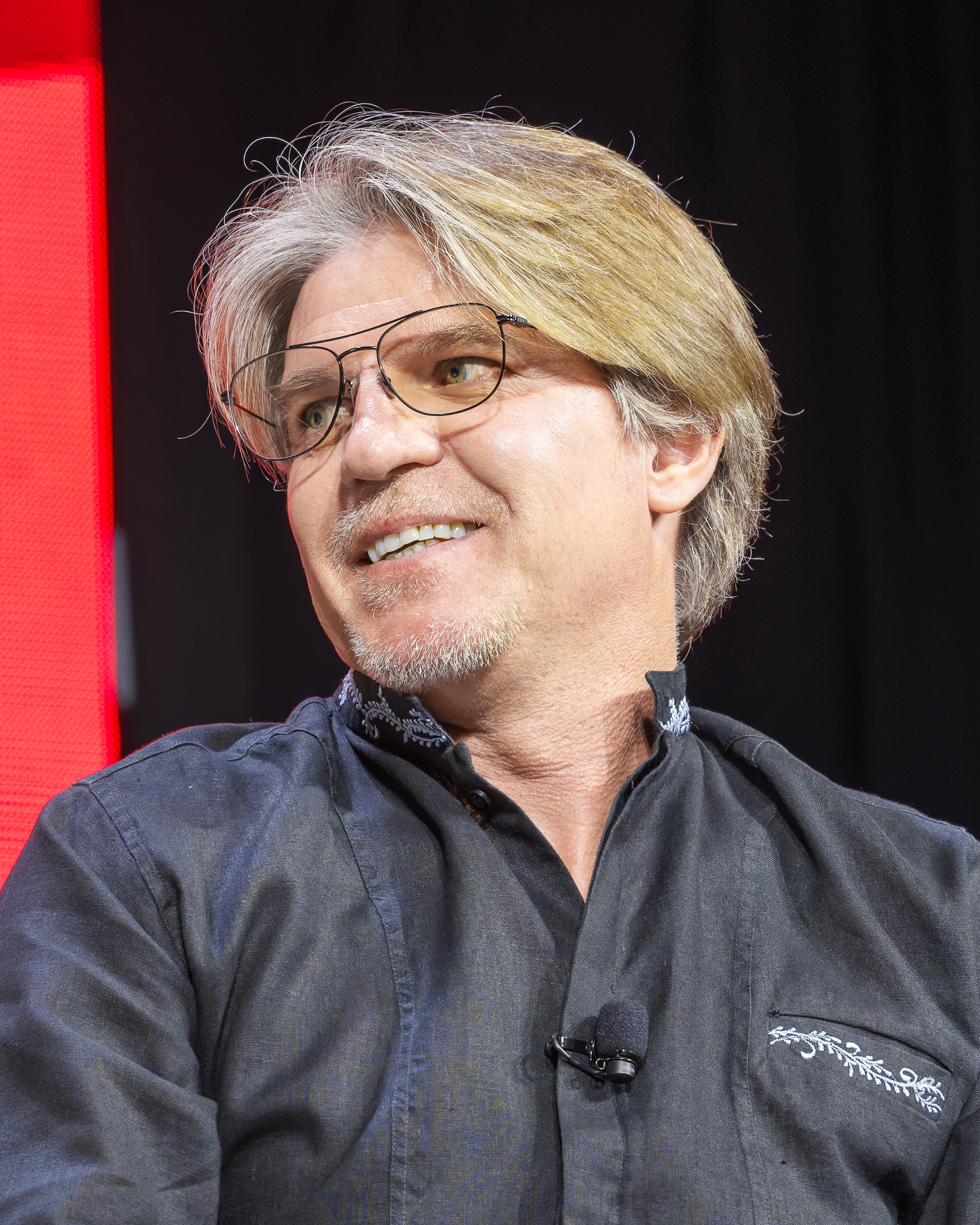
- Radu in 2026
- Born: 1975 or 1976 (age 49–50); Deva, Romania
- Education: West University of Timișoara
- Occupation: Investigative journalist
- Organization(s): Organized Crime and Corruption Reporting Project; Romanian Center for Investigative Journalism
- Known for: Investigating transnational crime in Eastern Europe

Paul Radu (born 1975–76) is an investigative journalist from Romania. He is the co-founder of the Organized Crime and Corruption Reporting Project, for which he and co-founder Drew Sullivan (journalist) received the Special Award by the European Press Prize. He is also one of the cofounders of the Romanian Center for Investigative Journalism.

== Early life ==
Radu was born in Deva, Hunedoara County, in a family with roots both from the region and from Timișoara. While studying at the University of Timișoara, he started working for a local newspaper. After graduation, he moved to Bucharest, where he was assigned investigative work and also covered criminal affairs for several newspapers.

== Awards and recognition ==
He is the recipient of numerous awards including in 2004, the Knight International Journalism Award and the Investigative Reporters and Editors Award, in 2007, the Global Shining Light Award, the Tom Renner Investigative Reporters and Editors Award, the 2011 the Daniel Pearl Award for Outstanding International Investigative Reporting and the 2015 European Press Prize. In 2020 he was awarded the Skoll Foundation Award for Social Entrepreneurship and He has also been part of the Panama Papers multiple awards winning team.

In 2008, he sat on a Central European Initiative jury to name that year's best investigative journalist; the jury chose Drago Hedl. In 2009, he appeared on 48 Hours investigating sexual slavery and human trafficking in Romania. He has also investigated human trafficking in Bosnia and Herzegovina.

Paul has been selected for a number of fellowships including the Alfred Friendly Press Fellowship in 2001, the Milena Jesenska Press Fellowship in 2002, the Rosalynn Carter Fellowship for Mental Health Journalism in 2007, the 2008 Knight International Journalism fellowship with the International Center for Journalists and he was selected as an Ashoka Global Fellow in 2018. He is a board member for the Global Investigative Journalism Network, a member of the International Consortium of Investigative Journalists, a member of the jury for the global Sigma Data Journalism Awards, and a member of the Allard Prize advisory board.

== Journalistic Work ==
Radu is the executive producer of the award-winning film “The Killing of a Journalist.”

In 2023, he co-founded Floodlight: Fiction in the Public Interest, an initiative that brings together investigative journalists and filmmakers together to make TV series and films.

Also in 2023, Radu oversaw the NarcoFiles project, a series of investigations that revealed the inner workings of transnational smuggling gangs from Latin America to Europe.

Radu is a co-founder of the Journalism Cloud Alliance, which is examining data storage costs and risks to ensure newsrooms can increase investigative journalism capacity and stay sustainable. He is a committee member of the Paris Charter on AI and Journalism which defines ethics and principles that journalists, newsrooms and media outlets can apply in their work with artificial intelligence.

In 2020 Radu was sued for defamation in London by Azerbaijani MP, Javanshir Feyziyev, over two articles in OCCRP's award-winning Azerbaijan Laundromat series about money-laundering out of Azerbaijan. The case was discontinued two weeks before the trial was to start.
