= RISE Project =

Romanian investigative journalism project

RISE Project is a Romanian non-profit journalism organization founded in early 2012 by a group of investigative journalists, activists, programmers and graphic designers.

RISE Project uses research techniques and technology to generate complex investigative reporting on local and crossborder organized crime and corruption networks. It produces investigative articles and visual databases and it develops research and data visualization tools such as the Visual Investigative Scenarios (VIS) platform.

RISE Project is a member of the regional network Organized Crime and Corruption Reporting Project (OCCRP) and of the Global Investigative Journalism Network.

== Investigations ==
In 2012 and 2013, RISE exposed several national and international cases of organized crime and corruption with serious social, economic and political impact, such as:

- identified secret businesses and assets of high-rank Romanian politicians (The Businesses of the Power and of the Opposition)
- revealed financial connections between prominent Church officials and organized crime (The Affairs of the Church)
- untangled networks of hidden money transactions between large international corporations and public authorities in Romania (The Ericsson Case)
- worked on large tax evasion cases involving cross-border food import-export structures (The Market Sultans) and The Horse Meat Affair
- traced Egypt's public money hidden in Romania and abroad by Hosni Mubarak and his associates (Mubarak's Money Hidden in Romania) and that of Syria's dictator Bashar Al Assad (Bashar's Clan Runs Business in Romania
- uncovered and prevented fraud in Romania and Moldova (The Bingo Fraud Exported to Moldova)
- disclosed agreements and corruption cases behind a major gold exploitation project in Romania (The Rosia Montana Affair)
- an assassination attempt on a Russian banker which led the Moldovan government to ban the pro-Russian political party Patria from the 2014 elections and the party's leader to flee the country (investigation made along with colleagues from RISE Moldova.

RISE Project investigations have been quoted in local and international media, and some of its members are winners of prestigious international journalism awards such as: the Daniel Pearl Award for Outstanding International Investigative Reporting (part of an OCCRP project), The Global Shining Light Award, and Investigative Reporters and Editors Tom Renner Award for crime reporting.

Following an investigation into Liviu Dragnea the Romanian Data Protection Authority (ANSPDCP) used a GDPR request to demand information on the RISE Project's sources.

== Awards ==
In 2019, Attila Biro from the RISE Project and his colleague from Bivol.bg Dimitar Stoyanov received the Axel Springer Award for young journalists for a joint investigation into the abuse of European Union funds.
