= Fritt Ord =

Fritt Ord (literally, "free speech") may refer to:

- Fritt Ord (journal), a Norwegian liberal Christian journal founded in 1931
- Fritt Ord (organization), a Norwegian private organization founded in 1974 by the Narvesen chain of convenience stores
