= Mikalai Varabei =

Belarusian businessman

Mikalai Mikalaevich Varabei
- Мікалай Мікалаевіч Варабей
- Born: May 4, 1963; Ukrainian SSR, Soviet Union
- Other names: Mikalai Verabei or Vorobey
- Citizenship: Belarusian
- Education: History Department of the National University of Kyiv
- Occupation: Businessman
- Known for: Petrochemical and coal wholesaler who is closely associated with Belarusian president Alexander Lukashenko

Mikalai Mikalaevich Varabei (or Verabei, Belarusian: Мікалай Мікалаевіч Варабей / Верабей; Nikolay Nikolayevich Vorobey, Russian: Николай Николаевич Воробей) is a Belarusian businessman (petrochemical and coal wholesaler, banker).

Due to his close relations with Belarusian president Alexander Lukashenko, in 2020, the Council of the European Union imposed sanctions on him, as did several non-EU countries.

== Early life ==
External image
- Left to right: Alexander Lukashenko, Victor Lukashenko, Mikalai Varabei, Aliaksei Aleksin, Aliaksandr Zaitsau

Early life of Varabei is almost unknown. He was born presumably in 1963 in Ukrainian SSR and graduated from the Kyiv State University (history department).

In the only (as of 2020) interview, he stated that he lives in Belarus after having completed his military service in the Soviet Army in 1985–1987. In 2016, businessman and statesman Aliaksandr Shakutsin claimed that he knew Varabei for 20 years.

It was reported that he worked as a car service station master in Navapolack. Some media called him "a native of Naftan [oil refinery]" (also in Navapolack).

== Assets and international sanctions ==
In early 2014, Varabei became officially known as the co-owner (with Shakutsin) of OOO Interservis (Russian: ООО Интерсервис). In early 2010s, Interservis was suspected to participate in the illegal trade schemes, exporting Russian and Belarusian petrochemicals made from Russian petroleum as goods with smaller export duties ("solvents affair"). In 2012–2013, Interservis bought bitumen refinery in Minsk region and increased its share in Amkodor machinery factory. In 2014, Interservis bought Belarusian Absolutbank. Later, Shakutsin and Varabei divided their assets: Varabei got bitumen refinery, petrochemical business and bank, and Shakutsin got Amkodor company.

In 2013, Varabei became a co-founder and co-owner of Bremino Group (with Aliaksei Aleksin and Aliaksandr Zaitsau), which operates several logistics complexes and a special economic zone in Orsha district, created by Lukashenko's decree. Belarusian economist Jaroslav Romanchuk called Bremino projects a business of elites, establishment and siloviki. Romanchuk also suggested that these businessmen will turn into business oligarchs.

As of 2019, 100% of shares in OOO Interservis belonged to OOO Krasny Bor. 99% of OOO Krasny Bor was owned by Varabei, 1% was owned by his wife Tamara. OOO Krasny Bor also owns one of the biggest hunting farms in Belarus. In 2019, Ezhednevnik magazine put Varabei on 16th place in its top-200 of Belarusian wealthy and influential businessmen.

On 17 December 2020, the Council of the European Union imposed sanctions on both Varabei and Shakutsin (EU Regulation No 2020/2129). According to the regulation, Varabei was recognized "benefiting from and supporting the Lukashenka regime" for his activities in Bremino Group, which enjoyed several forms of support by the government, including tax breaks. On 21 June 2021, his two companies, Bremino and NNK, were added to the EU list as well. Varabei and these two companies were also sanctioned by the United Kingdom, Switzerland, and Canada.

On 23 December 2020, Belarusian media tut.by noticed that the "Absolutbank" changed the page with the ownership structure. According to the updated information, owners of the Interservis are three people reported to be the company's management. Varabei and his wife were not mentioned in the new version (original version of the page was saved by the Internet Archive)

On 19 February 2021, National Security and Defense Council of Ukraine ordered to nationalize Soviet-built oil product pipeline Prykarpatzakhidtrans (Ukrainian: Прикарпатзахідтранс; Russian: Прикарпатзападтранс — Prikarpatzapadtrans), which was owned by Mikalai Varabei and a German resident, allegedly associated with Viktor Medvedchuk.

On 9 August 2021, Varabei was added to the SDN list by the United States Department of the Treasury's Office of Foreign Assets Control. Companies owned by him or otherwise linked to Varabei (Absolutbank, BelKazTrans, BelKazTrans Ukraine, Bremino Group, Industrial Unitary Enterprise Oil Bitumen Plant, Interservice, NNK, NNK East) were designated as well.

A BYPOL investigation has uncovered that Varabei had gifted a vintage ZIS-110 worth about half a million dollars and a Tesla Model S to Lukashenko. According to a September 2022 joint investigation by the Belarusian Investigative Center and Dossier, Varabei's immediate family controls multiple properties in Austria, including a chalet in Carinthia and flats in Vienna.

Varabei also has business activities in Ukraine. He is allegedly connected with Ukrainian oligarch Viktor Medvedchuk and with NT Marine company which sells Russian coal to Ukraine. On 9 December 2020, Ukrainian anti-monopoly committee published regulation (23 November 2020 727-r) which allowed Varabei to buy Ukrainian BTA Bank. Later National Bank of Ukraine refused to sell the bank to Varabei. In 2022, Varabei, Bremino Group and NNK were added to the sanctions lists of Ukraine and Japan, while Absolutbank and Varabei's daughter Ekaterina Smushkovich were blacklisted by Canada.

In November 2023, the European General Court dismissed Varabei's request to lift the European Union sanctions against him.
