= Fritt Ord (journal) =

Discontinued Christian magazine in Norway (1931–1940)

Fritt Ord (meaning Free Word in English) was a Norwegian journal, founded in 1931 by theologian Kristian Schjelderup, who later became known as a liberal bishop in the Church of Norway. It was published by Gyldendal in Oslo.

Fritt Ord served as the journal of Landslaget for frilyndt kristendom (National organization of liberal Christians), a liberal organization within the Church of Norway. From 1938, Fritt Ord was the organ of the Nansen School (Norwegian Academy of Humanities). Like the Nansen School, the journal was part of a broad humanistic tradition, an ethical-philosophical current that cuts across religions and views of life and about which the Nansen School was formed to spread knowledge. Schjelderup served as editor from 1931 until 1940 when the journal was discontinued.
