= Investigate Europe =

Cross-border journalism organisation

- Formation: 2016
- Headquarters: Berlin, Germany
- Managing Directors: Alessia Cerantola, Peter Matjašič
- Website: https://www.investigate-europe.eu

Investigate Europe is a team of investigative journalists focusing on in-depth European issues, using techniques such as open source reporting, data journalism and freedom of information requests. The organisation is registered as a not-for-profit European cooperative. Its reporters conduct in-depth, cross-border investigations into migration, conflict and corruption, and work with leading media to publish their findings. This collaborative approach raises public awareness of under-reported issues.

== History ==
Investigate Europe was founded in 2016 by a group of economic journalists from different European countries. It was registered as a non-profit organisation in 2019. The organisations first managing directors were Oliver Moldenhauer and Elisa Simantke.

== Publications ==
Investigate Europe has published dozens of cross-border investigations since its foundation. Of particular note is its investigation into a previously little-known investment protection treaty, the Energy Charter Treaty. As a result, more than a million people signed a petition calling on EU countries to withdraw from the treaty. Multiple EU member states eventually withdrew from the treaty. In another investigation Investigate Europe revealed the Moria logbook, in which the camp management recorded the conditions under which unaccompanied minors were housed in the Moria refugee camp on the Greek island of Lesbos. In the Secrets of Council project, Investigate Europe has been working since 2017 to make decision-making in the Council of the EU more transparent.

== Recognitions ==
Investigate Europe's research is published in Europe's major newspapers, including the Guardian, Público, Mediapart, Il Fatto Quotidiano, Dagens Nyheter, Gazeta Wyborcza, Republik, Der Standard and Tagesspiegel. The organisation's work has contributed to public debates, policy discussions and legislative processes in the EU and its member states.

A selection of prize nominations and awards:

- 2023: Awarded "Highly Recommended" in the International News Media Organisation of the Year category by the British Society of Editors
- 2022: IJ4EU Impact Award
- 2021: Shortlisted for the German Reporterpreis
- 2021: Shortlisted for the European Press Prize Award for Distinguished Reporting
- 2020: Longlist in the "Documentary" category of the Henri Nannen Prize
- 2019: Hans Matthöfer Award for Economic Journalism
- 2017: Keynes Society Award for Economic Journalism

== Funding ==
A number of small and large donors support Investigate Europe's work, as do foundations - including Fritt Ord, the Schöpflin Foundation, the Rudolf Augstein Foundation and the Reva and David Logan Foundation. In addition, the Journalismfund and IJ4EU programmes have supported several Investigate Europe investigations.
