= Russian Asset Tracker =

Database of Russian-owned assets 2022

Russian Asset Tracker is a database launched by the Organized Crime and Corruption Reporting Project to track the assets of the oligarchs and other influential Russians who have links to the Russian president Vladimir Putin. The tracker is a global collaboration between 27 media outlets, and it provides an interactive display of the "vast wealth held outside Russia by oligarchs and key figures close" to the Russian president. By April 2022, the project had identified 11 individuals with $17.5 billion in combined assets.
