= Paweł Reszka =

Polish journalist and war correspondent (born 1969)

- Born: 1969 (age 56–57)
- Occupations: Journalist, war correspondent, author
- Employer: Polityka

Paweł Reszka (born 1969) is a Polish journalist, war correspondent and author. He has been head of the national desk at the weekly Polityka since 2019. He has reported from wars in Chechnya, Georgia and Ukraine.

== Career ==
From 2003 to 2006, Reszka was the Moscow correspondent of the daily Rzeczpospolita. In August 2005, he was beaten by a group of about five men in Moscow and taken to hospital with head injuries.

He later worked in a reporting partnership with the investigative journalist Michał Majewski; in 2012 the two published investigations and interviews in the weekly Wprost. From 2013 to 2017 he worked for Tygodnik Powszechny, and in January 2017 he joined Newsweek Polska. In February 2019 he moved to Polityka. He has also taught reportage at the journalism faculty of the University of Warsaw.

Since 2022 he has reported from the front line of the Russian invasion of Ukraine. His 2024 book Stolik z widokiem na Kreml (A Table with a View of the Kremlin), about his years in Russia and the friendships lost to its wars, takes readers from the ruins of Grozny to burning houses in Georgia, separatist-held Donetsk and the mass graves of Bucha. It was translated into Ukrainian by Oleksandr Boichenko, and Reszka presented it at events in Ukraine, including in Kyiv in May 2025.

== Awards ==
- 2005: Dariusz Fikus Award, for his writing on Polish–Russian relations
- 2008: MediaTory award in the ProwokaTOR category, with Michał Majewski
- 2010: Radio Zet Andrzej Woyciechowski Award, with Michał Majewski, for a series of articles on the Smolensk air disaster
- 2016: MediaTory award in the ProwokaTOR category
- 2019: Radio Zet Andrzej Woyciechowski special award "Journalist of the Decade", with Bianka Mikołajewska and Adam Pieczyński
- 2022: Radio Zet Andrzej Woyciechowski Award for a series of reports from Ukraine during the war

== Selected works ==
- Miejsce po imperium (Świat Książki, 2007)
- Daleko od Wawelu (Czerwone i Czarne, 2010), with Michał Majewski
- Stolik z widokiem na Kreml (Wielka Litera, 2024) ISBN 978-83-8360-007-9
