= Center for Investigative Reporting (Bosnia and Herzegovina) =

The Center for Investigative Reporting/Centar za istraživačko novinarstvo (CIN) is a non-profit investigative center that investigates corruption, organized crime and other systemic irregularities in Bosnia and Herzegovina. It is based in Sarajevo but covers much of the Balkan region. Its stories appear in local media and other publications. The Center publishes stories and other materials such as online databases, info-graphics, maps and other on its website.

== History ==
The Center for Investigative Reporting in Sarajevo is unique in Bosnia and Herzegovina, the first organization of its kind to be established in Balkans. CIN is dedicated to investigative reporting, aimed toward providing fair and unbiased information, based on evidences and solid proof, to BiH citizens who need to make educated decisions.

CIN's work focuses on organized crime and corruption and the negative effect they have on the lives of ordinary citizens. They put out investigative projects and stories on topics that include education, health, sports, employment, politics, illegal trading in tobacco and drugs, illegal drugs and documents, and financial fraud.

CIN was started in 2004 with a USAID grant and technical assistance and support from the New York University School of Journalism and the Journalism Development Group. Today, CIN is an independent media agency; its investigative pieces are regularly published by local and regional media in printed and electronic formats. CIN stories are published on major web portals in BiH and in the region, and the number of individual visitors on www.cin.ba is increasing. CIN work is available for free to all partner organizations that credit CIN as their source.

The center cooperates with a number of distinguished media outlets world-wide and its stories have appeared in print form in the Guardian, Time, Der Spiegel, Washington Post, and on radio and TV stations including ZDF, BBC, and Deutsche Welle. CIN work is regularly published by the most prominent media outlets of Serbia, Croatia and Montenegro. In addition, they are distributed through Radio Free Europe/TV Liberty. CIN has done much work with one of the leading associations of investigative journalists in the world – the International Consortium of Investigative Journalists.

The center also is a founding member of the Organized Crime and Corruption Reporting Project (OCCRP) which brings together independent investigative reporters and organizations throughout South East Europe and Central Asia on journalistic investigations.

CIN produces documentaries and video materials in support of its investigative articles. These are broadcast through public and independent TV stations in BiH.

The CIN team is composed of 18 people who come from part of BiH with experience in different media. Two international editors serve as advisors to local editors who are charged with maintaining international standards in work and continuous staff training.

CIN is funded through grants from international donors. The intention is to develop a sustainable news product that attracts revenues to cover a part of organizational expenses.

CIN has won an impressive number of prestigious awards.

== Awards ==
CIN has won a number of awards both local and international.

- USC Annenberg Scholl of Communication Online Journalism Award 2007 – Small Sites for series of stories "Danger on Your Plate"
- Vecernji List Award – Media Stamp 2007
- Transparency International BiH Award for Journalism Integrity 2007
- Renovabis: Journalistenpreis Osteuropa 2008 for story on Small and Medium Enterprises in BiH
- Thomson Reuters Foundation & Media center Sarajevo Award for Best Story on Governance and Corruption, 2012
- Annual Robert F. Kennedy Journalism Award 2012 for International Social Media for story "Camping around Fire instead of Going to prison"
- Award for the best corruption reporting in 2013 from the Anti-Corruption Network in Bosnia and Herzegovina (BiH ACCOUNT) for The Former Head of UIO BiH Owns a Million in Assets
- SEEMO/CEI Award for Investigative Reporting in 2013 for Balkan Share Traders Endangered German Stock Exchange
- UNICEF prize award for the special journalistic contribution on the promotion and protection of children's rights in 2013 went to Writing Cyrillic and Reading Latin.
- July 2014. USAID journalism award on the issue of foster children for a story, "The Dear Cost Of Having Roof Over Your Head". The award was part of the USAID project on strengthening government institutions and reforms in BiH.
- July 2014. ACCOUNT, anti-corruption network in BiH, gave an award for the best corruption report for the story "The Valuable Property Holdings of Faris Gavrankapetanović".
- July 2014. ACCOUNT, anti-corruption network in BiH, gave an award for the best video about corruption to a documentary "Policemen And/Or Criminals".
- SEEMO / CEI award for investigative reporting for young journalists 2014., for story „The Dear Cost of Having a Roof over your Head".
- June 2015 – European Union's second award for investigative reporting in Bosnia and Herzegovina in 2014 for Allowance for Accommodation in One's Own Apartment
- June 2015 – European Union's third award for investigative reporting in Bosnia and Herzegovina in 2014 for Policemen And/Or Criminals
- June 2015 – ACCOUNT, anti-corruption network in BiH, gave an award for the best 2014 corruption report for the story Allowance for Accommodation in One's Own Apartment.
- September 2015 – Srđan Aleksić award for professional reporting. The award is sponsored by the United States Agency for International Development and its PRO-Future project.
- May 2015 – European Union's second award for investigative reporting in Bosnia and Herzegovina in 2014 for Čović's Rich Father-in-law.
- June 2016 – ACCOUNT, anti-corruption network in BiH, gave an award for the best corruption reporting for the story Čović's Rich Father-in-law.
- July 2016 – World Summit Awards announced CIN's databases as one of the five best digital media projects worldwide.
- May 2017 – Award "Reporter of the Year" from the BiH Association of Journalists for the Bosnalijek stories.

Awards for regional projects

- Shining Light Award 2007 for series of stories on Power Brokers
- International Consortium of Investigative Journalists (ICIJ) Daniel Pearl Award for Outstanding International Investigative Reporting 2010– finalist for series of stories on "Document Dilemma"
- International Consortium of Investigative Journalists (ICIJ) Daniel Pearl Award for Outstanding International Investigative Reporting 2011 – winner for series of stories on "Offshore Crime, Inc."
- US Embassy in Serbia & Independent Journalism Association of Serbia (NUNS) Award for Investigative Journalism 2012 for series of stories on "Project Copic".
- CIN's story "Bought International Awards to Show Off at Home Turf" won the Best 2014 Investigative Story awarded by the American Embassy in Serbia and the Independent Journalists' Association of Serbia (NUNS).
- UNDP Moldova third award for investigative reporting for a story about Bosnalijek.

Special Recognition

- BH Telecom Union Special recognition for Cooperation and Support, May 2012.
- SEEMO/CEI Award for Outstanding Merits in Investigative Journalism 2012 – special mention for outstanding results in investigative journalism
- A special mention for the journalistic contribution on the propomotion and protection of children's rights in 2013 went to How Music Woke up Stolac and Ballet Shook up Mostar.
