= Yury Chyzh =

Belarusian businessman

Yury Chyzh (Belarusian: Юрый Чыж, Russian: Юрий Чиж, Yury Chizh, born 1963) is a Belarusian businessman, believed to be one of the country's richest people. According to estimates, he is the second-wealthiest businessman in Belarus, the first being Vladimir Peftiev. On March 23, 2012, Chyzh was included in EU's travel ban list because of his alleged ties to the regime of Alexander Lukashenko.

== Early life ==
Yury chyzh was born in the village Sabali, Biaroza Raion, Brest Province in south-western Belarus.

He graduated from the electronic technical faculty of the Belarusian Polytechnical Institute. After graduation he made a career at the Minsk Tractor Plant and became head of energy supply of one of the factory's facilities.

== As a businessman ==
In 1994 Yury Chyzh established his company, Triple, which is active in construction business and production of construction materials.

In the following years his business expanded into production of non-alcoholic drinks (AquaTriple), production of aluminium constructions, transport and several other areas. Yury Chyzh owns the prominent restaurant and brewery Rakauski brovar in Minsk.

In 1999 Chyzh became member of the Council on development of entrepreneurship under the President of Belarus Alexander Lukashenko.

A BYPOL investigation has uncovered that Yury Chyzh had gifted a 2008 Rolls-Royce Phantom Coupé worth half a million US dollars and a 1988 Panther Kallista to Lukashenko.

As of 2013, Chyzh’s total wealth was estimated at $200 mln. He owned three petrochemical companies: Neonafta, Trayplenergo and Belneftegaz, meanwhile his Triple Group included 18 companies.

In October 2022, the Belarusian Investigative Center declared that Yury Chyzh and his Lithuanian business partner Vitold Tomaševskij resold Russian oil under the guise of solvents in 2011–2012.

Chyzh has apparently fallen out of favor with the Belarusian authorities. He was under arrest in 2016 and from 2021 to 2022 on tax evasion charges; in February 2023, Chyzh was sentenced to three and a half years in prison, but was released from serving the term due to an amnesty and the time he had spent in custody.

In 2026, OCCRP, Belarusian Investigative Center, ZDF, Der Standard, Paper Trail Media, and Cyber Partisans published an investigation into the business ties of Yuri Chizh's business ties to the family of former President Of Cyprus Nicos Anastasiades.

== Social activity ==
Yury Chyzh was president of the FC Dinamo Minsk. In 2008–2016, he was head of the Belarusian national wrestling federation. Chyzh sponsored the development of sports infrastructure in Minsk, including the construction of ice hockey rinks and the renovation of the Dynamo football stadium.

== Family ==
Yury Chyzh was married with two sons and a daughter. In the spring of 2023, Yury Chyzh confirmed in an interview that he had divorced his wife and was in conflict with his family.

== External list ==
- Найбагацейшыя людзі Беларусі
- Triple Group official website
