= Hristo Kovachki =

Bulgarian businessman

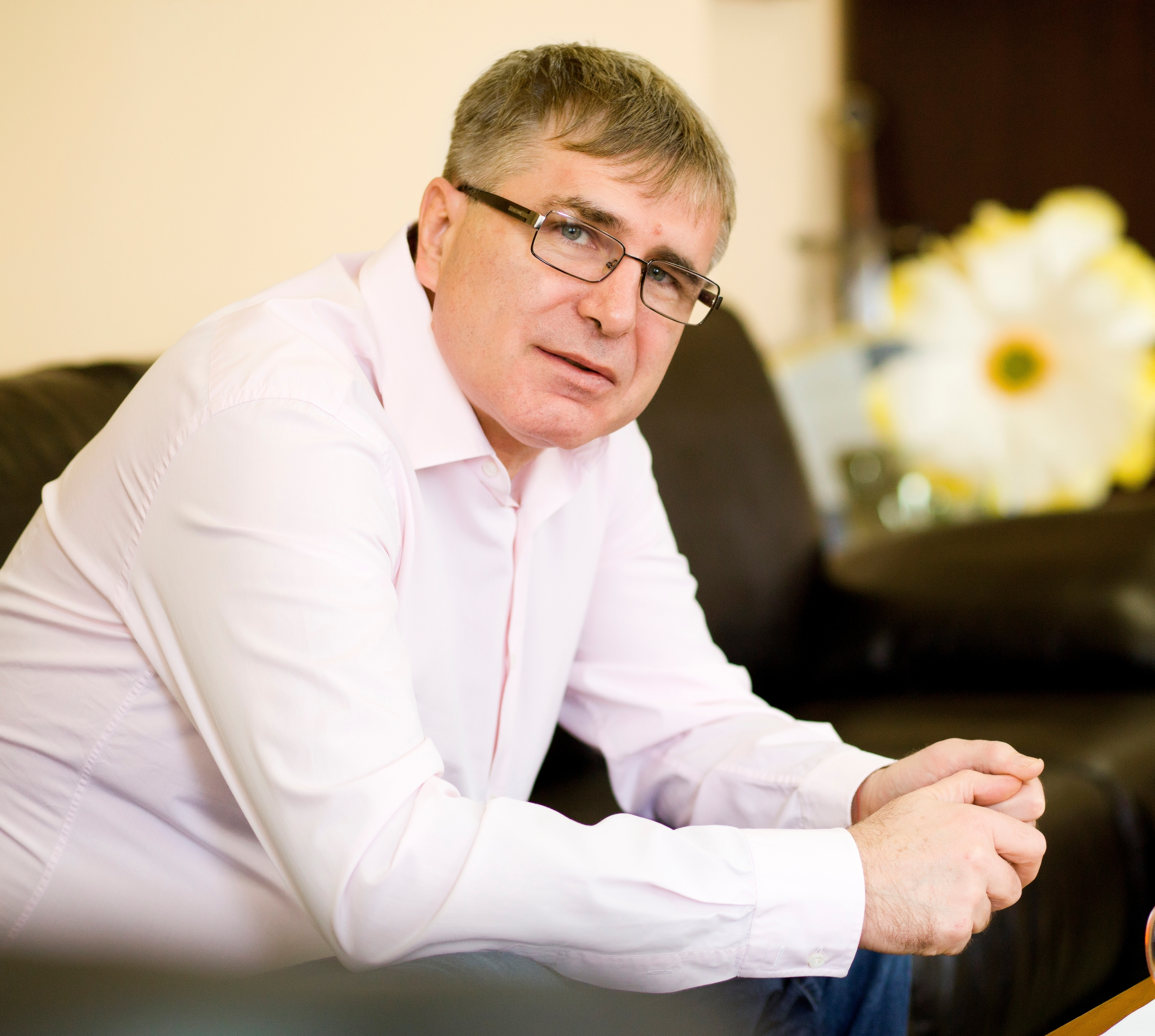

Personal details
- Born: 17 December 1962 (age 63) Samokov, Bulgaria
- Spouse: Dessislava Kovachka
- Children: Alexandra, Hristo
- Profession: Businessman, entrepreneur

Hristo Atanasov Kovachki (Bulgarian: Христо Атанасов Ковачки) is a Bulgarian entrepreneur born on 17 December 1962 in the town of Samokov (Bulgaria). He is married to the former pop folk singer Desislava, with whom he has two children – a daughter Alexandra, and a son Hristo. He graduated in St. Petersburg as a doctor of technical sciences and is an owner of a number of companies, as he has business interests in the field of energy as well.

== Education ==
In 1980 Hristo Kovachki graduated from the Secondary School of Mathematics in his hometown Samokov. He was admitted to study higher education at ITMO University (former LIFMO – Leningrad Institute of Fine Mechanics and Optics) in the city of St. Petersburg, Russia. Interested in science, in 1991 he successfully completed a PhD study by defending dissertation thesis Use of lasers in microelectronics. In 1994 he was awarded the degree of Doctor of Technical Sciences by the aforementioned university. In 2013 he was awarded the degree of "professor" by the International Slavonic Academy in Moscow. He is fluent in Russian, English and French. Hristo Kovachki is the author of a number of inventions, which are applied in laser technology, electronics and the energy sector.

== Early career ==
After his graduation Hristo Kovachki works on projects related to laser technologies. In parallel, he also elaborates and patents various inventions in Bulgaria, Russia and the European Union.

Since 1992 he develops his own business.

== Business ==
In the late 1990s Hristo Kovachki started developing his business interests in the field of energy.

He participates in the governing bodies of several energy companies. His name is linked to privatization deals in the mining industry (Beli Breg Mine, Stanyantsi Mine, MOV-Pernik, Bobov Dol Coalmining, Balkan Mine, Black Sea Mine, Chukurovo Mine) and the energy sector (TPP Dimitrovgrad, TPP Bobov Dol, Brikel – Galabovo, which is the only producer of briquettes within the Balkans).

It is believed that he is associated with a number of district heating companies in the country, both gas- and coal-based, in the towns of Burgas, Sliven, Pernik, Gabrovo, Vratsa, Pleven, Ruse, Veliko Tarnovo.

== Energy privatization ==
Hristo Kovachki's first participation in energy privatization was in 2000 with the purchase of the Pasarel and Kokalyane hydroelectric power plants. The price of the deal was 1.94 million dollars, the buyer was LM Impex EOOD. Later, Kovachki resold the hydroelectric power plants to the French concern EDF. The annual income from them in recent years amounted to 4 million leva. In media publications, the price of these transactions was determined to be significantly low. [link]

In 2001, the Privatization Agency sold 80% of Mina Chukurovo AD near the village of Gabra at an auction. The buyer was a consortium including: LM Impex, Elshitsa 99 AD - a company of the Panagyurishte mines, as well as Widex EOOD - then the owner of the Midzhur explosives factory in the village of Gorni Lom. [link]

In the period 2003-2008, Kovachki privatized 19 energy companies, with his largest acquisition being the Bobov Dol Thermal Power Plant.

One of the significant acquisitions was the company Atomenergoremont, which is responsible for the repair of the Kozloduy Nuclear Power Plant. The company was privatized in 2003 and was among Kovachki's first acquisitions. The deal was financed by First Investment Bank, and the buyer was Bulgarian Energy Company. This was the company's first nuclear investment, which received 70% of Atomenergoremont's capital. In 2016 alone, the repair company's revenues were almost 50 million leva.

Kovachki's business empire includes more than 180 companies, and the core of the business circle is 19 companies - 8 mines, 8 district heating plants and 3 thermal power plants. The mining companies are: "Chukurovo", "Beli Breg", "Stanyantsi", "Cherno More - Burgas", "Mini Open Coal Mining - Pernik", "Balkan 2000", "Coal Mining Bobov Dol", "Fundamental". This network also includes the district heating systems in the cities of Burgas, Sliven, Ruse, Pernik, Pleven, Veliko Tarnovo, Gabrovo, Vratsa. The thermal power plants are TPP "Maritsa 3", TPP "Bobov Dol" and "Brikel" EAD. [link]

== Accusations of corporate voting ==
Although Kovachki's party is recognized in Bulgarian law, there are various speculations about its legitimacy. Various journalistic investigations accuse Kovachki of corporate voting practices. The first such accusations came in 2007, when media outlets reported how miners and other workers from the enterprises of this business circle voted en masse for the Leader Party. The investigations at that time relied on the number of votes for the party, which coincided with the number of workers in the respective enterprises. link Other similar revelations and video materials appeared again in 2014, when employees of the Bobov Dol mine were filmed voting in a controlled manner link.[1] Other accusations are related to WikiLeaks documents. There, the revelations point to pressure exerted on the employees of the enterprises and an incentive with a 50 leva higher advance for supporting elections. Although no official investigations have been conducted by the CEC, according to publications, it is believed that in cases where there are no LEADER candidates, support is directed towards the MRF or the BSP. link

== Book ==
In 2013 Hristo Kovachki released his first book to date entitled Universal order – theory of cognition. The book concerns a multitude of issues, starting with universal order, passing through biblical order, as the focus dwells on the theory of cognition and its various manifestations. The statement section formulates and discusses in detail the seven fundamental principles of cognition theory:

- First principle: The process of cognition is creative, positive, free and infinite;
- Second principle: The process of cognition is based on a reasonable form of existence of matter – reasonable individuals. The process of cognition is more powerful when this reasonable form of matter exists in harmony;
- Third principle: The more actively an individual participates in the cognition process, the higher form he will attain, both within society and within the entire civilization;
- Fourth principle: The greater the number of individuals is, the more intensified the cognition process will be.
- Fifth principle: The cognition process is based on reasonable forms of matter, which are reproducible.
- Sixth principle: The cognition process is a self-regulating process.
- Seventh principle: The cognition process is an evolutionary process.

Two corollaries are also inferred from these seven principles:

- The cognition process underlies the foundation of generating the social product. The more stimulated the cognition process is, the greater the social product will be.
- The social product produced by society should be distributed on a fair (prorated) basis among the members of this society in accordance with their participation in the cognition process.

== Wealth status ==
The Polish news weekly Wprost releases at the end of each year a list of "Top 100 Richest Central and Eastern Europeans". In 2008 three Bulgarians were included in the ranking – Vasil Bozhkov in the 61st, – Hristo Kovachki in the 98th and Valentin Zlatev in the 100th position. According to the publication the wealth of Hristo Kovachki is estimated at $700 million. The amount is calculated based on the value of assets managed by Kovachki at the time.

Hristo Kovachki occupies fourteenth place in the ranking of the most influential Bulgarians in 2013 by Forbes magazine. He is followed by the businessmen Sasho Donchev, Grisha Ganchev, Bogomil Manchev, Vasil Bozhkov and others.
