= Community of Railway Workers of Belarus =

Belarusian opposition initiative

- Сообщество железнодорожников Беларуси
- Leader: Sergei Voitsekhovich
- Founded: August 2020
- Country: Belarus
- Allegiance: Belarusian opposition
- Ideology: Anti-Lukashenko; Anti-war movement
- Status: Active
- Website: belzhd.info

Community of Railway Workers of Belarus (Russian: Сообщество железнодорожников Беларуси, romanized: Soobshchestvo zheleznodorozhnikov Belarusi) is a Belarusian opposition initiative of railway workers, recognized by the Belarusian authorities as an extremist formation.

Telegram channel "Live. The Community of Railway Workers of Belarus" was created in August 2020, a week after the presidential election and the start of mass demonstrations against Alexander Lukashenko.

Since the beginning of the Russian invasion of Ukraine in 2022, the community has been carrying out railroad sabotage in order to undermine the logistics of the Russian army.

On 21 March 2022, the "Community of Railway Workers was recognized as an extremist formation by a decision taken by the KGB of Belarus on March 21 because "a group of citizens united through the Telegram chat "Community of Railway Workers of Belarus" carries out extremist activities."

As of 30 March 2022, at least 40 railway workers were reportedly detained for subscribing to the movement's Telegram channel.

== See also ==
- Stop the Wagons
- Busly liaciać
