= KibOrg News =

KibOrg is a project of journalists and IT professionals who operate under the name of "Legendary Cyborgs" in opposition to Russian media and IT spaces. The project was founded in early 2022. The only public member to date is journalist Maksym Dudchenko.

== General information ==
The kiborg.news website was created long before Russia's full-scale armed aggression, but the activity of the participants intensified in the summer of 2022. The most high-profile information operations conducted under the project began to be published online at the end of 2022. KibOrg IT specialists conducted a series of defeats of the occupation portals of the occupied parts of Zaporizhzhia and Crimea. They also carried out hacker attacks on Russian government organizations, such as Roskomnadzor and the Ministry of Digital Development, Communications and Mass Media.

KibOrg is known to be working closely with the volunteer organization Inform Napalm, the Peacemaker Center, hacktivists from the Ukrainian Cyber Alliance, RUH8, hacktivists from the Cyber Resistance team, and Ukrainian law enforcement agencies. The exact number of project participants remains classified to this day.

== Notable KibOrg operations ==
=== Hacking of Boris Rapoport Crimean Tatar ATR ===
The KibOrg website published a series of articles based on the materials of the mail dump of Boris Rappoport, who worked in the Russian Presidential Administration under the leadership of Vladislav Surkov and Sergey Kiriyenko. The KibOrg materials reflected the organization of pseudo-democratic processes inside Russia (referendum, elections), interference in international affairs, and information methods used to manipulate the Russian population. The analysis of Rapoport's materials was continued by the Myrotvorets Center, which revealed Surkov's preparations for the seizure of Ukraine (late 2013/early 2014), work with agents in Ukraine and abroad, including a series of articles about Kazbek (Andriy Portnov).

=== Interception of Russian FSB documents in Crimea ===
In December 2022, the KibOrg team published intercepted documents related to the activities of the Russian FSB in (illegal) Russian annexed Crimea. The article contains evidence that the FSB has massively nationalized property on the peninsula. In addition, the obtained documents contain the addresses of the headquarters of the Russian special service, barracks, administration buildings, etc. In addition to office space, a large number of apartments were transferred to the possession of the Russian FSB in Crimea. The KibOrg team revealed their location and de-anonymized FSB officers stationed on the peninsula.

=== Hacking of Roskomnadzor ===
In March 2023, KibOrg News gained access to Roskomnadzor's database of more than 500 gigabytes. It also gained access to the correspondence of employees of the punitive agency that performs censorship functions in relation to the media and the Internet. The officers of the Department of the Federal Service for Supervision of Communications, Information Technology and Mass Media in the Republic of Crimea and the city of Sevastopol, who supervised pro-Ukrainian opposition publications such as the Center for Investigative Journalism, were identified. Also published were references to the opposition Russian politician Alexei Navalny and correspondence between Russian authorities and foreign platforms regarding the blocking of Russian propaganda films and Ramzan Kadyrov's Instagram account. Roskomnadzor's database was made publicly available on the KibOrg News Telegram channel in May of the same year.

=== Hacking of the Russian-Iranian videoconference of the Institute of CIS countries ===
KibOrg News, in cooperation with Ukrainian prankster Yevgeny Volnov, gained access to a seven-hour Russian-Iranian conference of the Institute of CIS countries in April 2023. After joining the conference, Volnov, under the fictitious name Simindey V.V., "thanked" the participants for their "meaningful speeches" and the organizers for the alleged "invitation of the Ukrainian side".

=== Hacking of the Dovzhansky-Novoshakhtynsk customs checkpoint ===
On May 2, 2023, KibOrg published a database of the Dovzhansky-Novoshakhtynsk border customs checkpoint, which has been under the control of Russia since 2014 following the outbreak of the War in Donbas. After seizing the Dovzhansky checkpoint, the illegal Russian separatists armed groups of the Luhansk People's Republic and Donetsk People's Republic began to unauthorizedly allow cargo from Russia to pass through. On June 12, 2014, the separatists received heavy armored vehicles for the first time – a convoy of T-64 tanks.

KibOrg News journalists published summary tables for 2015–2017, which confirm the facts of illegal export of Ukrainian coal by Russia. The facts of the export of Ukrainian aircraft engines TV3-117 from the Luhansk Aviation Repair Plant were established. In particular, the employees of the customs office were de-anonymized, and lists of employees of the so-called "State Customs Committee" of the occupied Luhansk region were published.

=== Publication of personal data of 600 thousand Russian conscripts ===
In May 2023, the KibOrg News team gained access to the computers of the Russian Ministry of Digital Development, Communications and Mass Media, which, on behalf of the Ministry of Defense, was to send out summonses using the Gosuslugi service. The hackers published a list with personal data of more than 600,000 Russians liable for military service. The table contained SNILS numbers, phone numbers, e-mails and personal information about the residence of those liable for military service.
