= Re:Baltica =

Latvian investigative journalist non-profit organization

The Baltic Center for Investigative Journalism Re:Baltica (Latvian: Baltijas pētnieciskās žurnālistikas centrs Re:Baltica) is a Latvia-based non-profit organization founded in 2011. It is based in Riga.

Re:Baltica focuses on in-depth investigations of important issues in the Baltic region, such as corruption, money laundering, entrepreneurship, health, human rights and disinformation. Reports are published on their website in Latvian, English and Russian. Re:Baltica produces work for free and encourages other media organizations to publish their work. Re:Baltica reports and journalists have been quoted on Al Jazeera, The Washington Post, Financial Times, Meduza, BuzzFeed News and other international media outlets.

Re:Baltica is a member of the Organized Crime and Corruption Reporting Project, Global Investigative Journalism Network. Inga Spriņģe, an investigative journalist and one of the two founders of Re: Baltica, is a member of the International Consortium of Investigative Journalists network.

== Re:Check ==
In 2019, Re:Baltica launched the fact-checking and social media research lab Re:Check. Its goal is to verify the truthfulness of claims by significant public figures, deconstruct lies and research communication trends on social networks. Re:Check in a member of the International Fact-Checking Network (IFCN). As of 2019, Re:Check in an official Facebook fact-checking partner.

== Awards ==
Re:Baltica is the recipient of several prizes, including the Greste Baltic Freedom of Speech Awards in 2018.

== Funding ==
Funding comes from three main sources:

- Internal revenue from teaching, moderating events, research and scripting documentaries
- Competitive grants, mostly from the institutions based in EU/NATO countries, for example, International Press Institute and Calouste Gulbenkian foundation.
- Donations, a list of whom is attached to the annual reports.

In 2022, 60% from internal revenue, 32% – from grants, and 8% of funding came from donations. The main sources of income (those exceeding 1% of Re:Baltica's total income) were IJ4EU, All Media Latvia, Meta, Media Defense Legal Initiative, Free Press Unlimited, Calouste Gulbenkian foundation, small donations from individuals and legal entities.
