= Organized Crime and Corruption Reporting Project =

International investigative journalism network

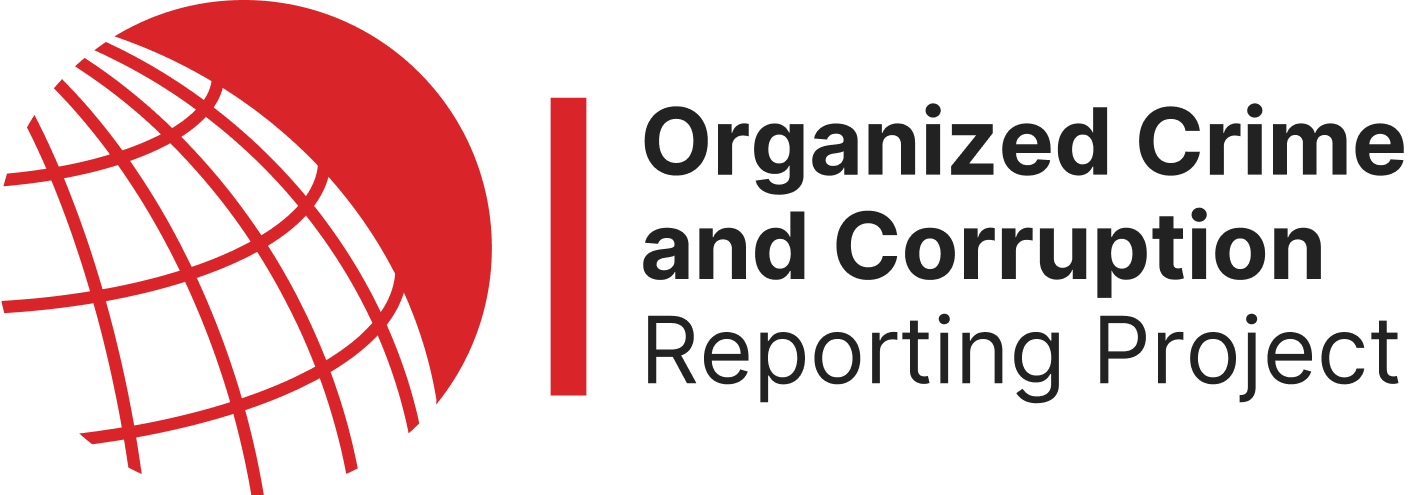

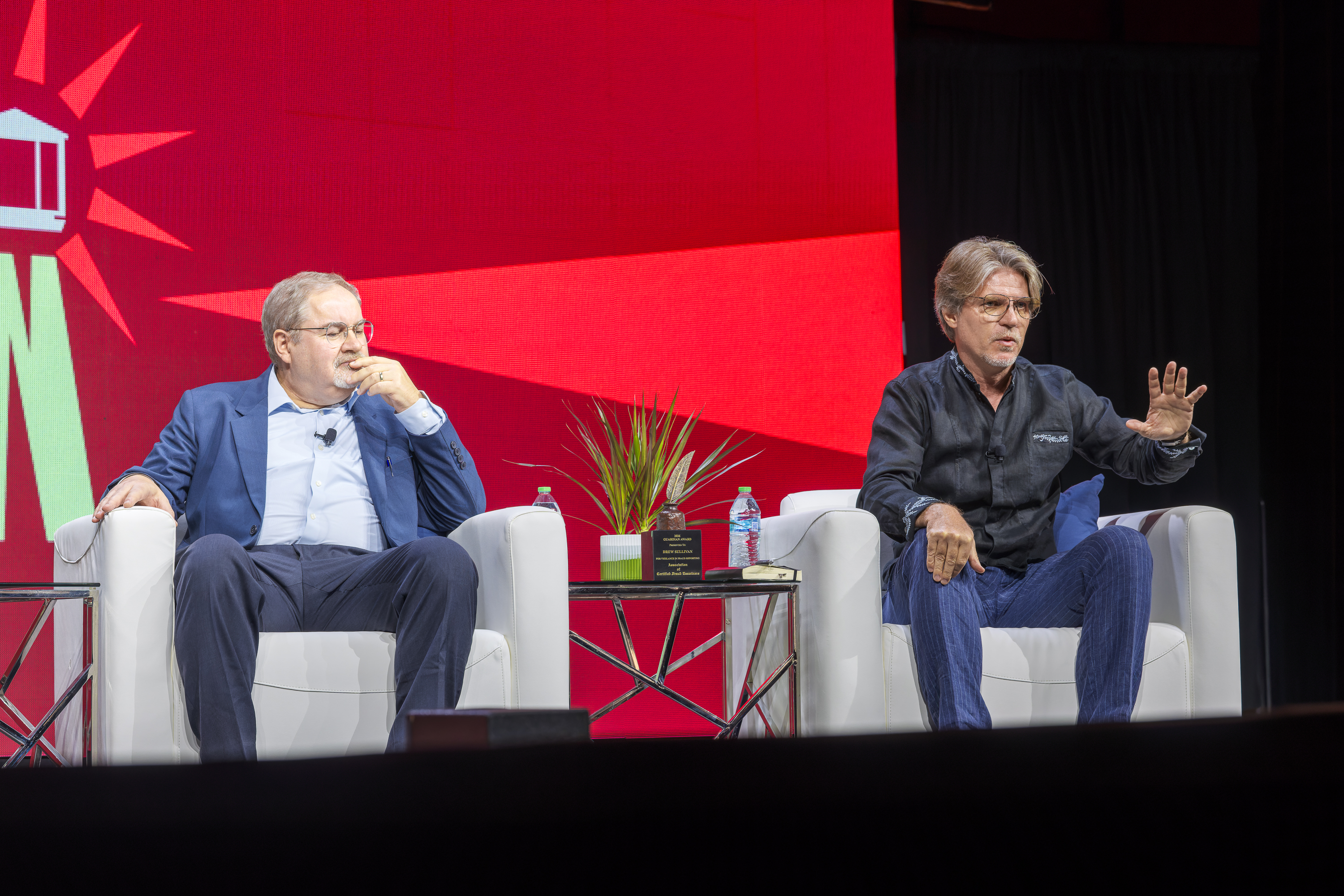
- Drew Sullivan and Paul Radu in 2026
- Formation: 2007; 19 years ago
- Founder: Drew Sullivan; Paul Radu
- Type: INGO; 501(c)(3) organization
- Tax ID no.: 26-0898750
- Purpose: Anti-corruption; crime prevention
- Editor-in-Chief: Miranda Patrucic
- Affiliations: Institute for Nonprofit News (member)
- Website: www.occrp.org

The Organized Crime and Corruption Reporting Project (OCCRP) is a United States non-governmental organization that fosters investigative journalism. It was founded in 2007 and specializes in organized crime and corruption.

It publishes its stories through local media and in English and Russian through its website. OCCRP works with and supports more than fifty independent media outlets across six continents. Throughout much of its existence, the majority of its budget was funded by the United States government via grants from various agencies. In 2025, this funding was frozen and OCCRP is now funded by other sources.

== History ==
OCCRP was founded by veteran journalists Drew Sullivan and Paul Radu. Sullivan was serving as the editor of the Center for Investigative Reporting (CIN) in Sarajevo and Radu worked with the Romanian Center for Investigative Journalism. The team paired with colleagues in the region on a story looking at energy traders, titled "The Power Brokers." The project showed that traders were buying power from state utilities at below production rates while the public was paying increasingly higher fees and experiencing widespread blackouts.

In March 2022, OCCRP was designated an undesirable organization in Russia.

== Work ==
=== Investigations ===
OCCRP has claimed the following totals as a result of its investigations since they began recording impact in 2009:

- More than US$12 billion in fines levied and assets seized by government agencies
- 1,083 government actions
- 841 arrests, indictments, or sentences
- 475 official investigations
- 309 civic actions
- 166 corporate actions
- 140 resignations or sackings of key figures, including a President, Prime Minister and CEOs of major international corporations

The OCCRP has been involved in a number of high-profile investigations, including looking at the offshore services industry, organized crime ownership in football clubs, casinos and the security industry.

==== Magnitsky case ====
In 2013, it investigated the Sergei Magnitsky case, the largest tax fraud in Russian history, and wrote that funds stolen from the Russian treasury ended up in a company now owned by the son of Moscow's former transportation minister. Some of the money was used to buy high-end real estate near Wall Street. US prosecutors have since sought to seize $18 million in property from the company.

==== Montenegro ====
It published stories on Montenegro's long-time President and Prime Minister Milo Đukanović. Two series looked at the ties between Đukanović and organized crime. One series traced the President's family-owned bank, Prva Banka (First Bank), and how the president privatized it to his brother cheaply, moved massive state funds into the bank and then loaned the money out to his family, friends and organized crime on overly favorable terms. When the bank failed under the weight of these bad loans, the president bailed it out with taxpayer money. The Central Bank said the government lied about repaying the loan simply shuttling funds back and forth and claiming the loan was repaid. A second series examined how the president through his staff kept close relationships to international drug traffickers like Darko Saric, and that municipalities controlled by the president's party gave prime coastal property almost for free to Saric. It also wrote that the Italian mafia was smuggling cigarettes to Italy from an island off the coast of Montenegro owned by Đukanović's good friend Stanko Subotić and controlled by Đukanović's head of security.

==== Moldova ====
It investigated an assassination attempt on a Russian banker which led the Moldovan government to ban the pro-Russian Patria political party from the 2014 elections and the party's leader to flee the country. It also looked at a massive money laundering scheme, the Russian Laundromat, that moved tens of billions of dollars into Europe using offshore companies, fake loans and bribed Moldovan judges. Some of the Russian banks involved were owned in part by Igor Putin, a cousin of Russian President Vladimir Putin.

==== Swedish telecom bribery scandal ====
In 2015, working with SVT and the TT News Agency, the OCCRP uncovered that the Swedish/Finnish Telecom giant TeliaSonera (now Telia), Vimpelcom and other phone companies had paid about $1 billion in bribes. More than $800 million in assets were seized or frozen by law enforcement after the scandal. Vimpelcom attempted to negotiate a $775 million fine for their part in the bribes, but was fined $795 million, including a $230 million criminal penalty to both U.S. and Dutch authorities, and a $375 million penalty to the U.S. Securities and Exchange Commission. OCCRP, SVT and TT News Agency were awarded The Golden Shovel, the most important award for investigative journalism in Sweden.

==== Panama Papers ====
OCCRP worked on the Panama Papers project with the International Consortium of Investigative Journalists and Süddeutsche Zeitung producing more than 40 stories on corruption through the use of offshore entities, which won the 2017 Pulitzer Prize Journalism. These included how friends close to Russian President Vladimir Putin were receiving large sums of money through offshore companies; how the President of Azerbaijan Ilham Aliyev owned a majority of his country's mining industry through offshore companies; and, how President Petro Poroshenko in Ukraine had violated Ukrainian law and avoided taxes using offshore companies.

==== Troika Laundromat ====
In 2019, OCCRP and 21 media partners discovered that Russia's former largest investment bank, Troika Dialog, had laundered $4.8 billion of funds. The so-called scheme, Troika laundromat, allowed funds to flow from Russian companies and figures into Europe and the US between 2003 and early 2013.

==== Formations House ====
In December 2019, Distributed Denial of Secrets (DDoSecrets) published "#29 Leaks" in partnership with the OCCRP and more than 20 outlets in 18 countries.

The 450 gigabytes of data came from Formations House (now The London Office), a "company mill" which registered and operated companies for clients included organized crime groups, state-owned oil companies, and fraudulent banks. The leak included emails, documents, faxes, and recordings of phone calls. Investigations revealed the firm ran a web of companies registered in Hong Kong, Cyprus, the British Virgin Islands and Pakistan, helped clients avoid anti–money laundering rules and had created banks in The Gambia in an attempt to create a tax haven. According to The Times, there was no evidence that Formations House did anything illegal but their investigation highlighted worrying vulnerabilities in the UK's defences against money laundering".

The release was compared to both the Panama Papers and the Paradise Papers. Belgian tax authorities initiated an investigation based on data from this leak and from the Cayman National Bank and Trust leak published by DDoSecrets the prior month. Politicians in Sweden and the UK, including anti-corruption chief John Penrose said the leak showed the need for reforms on company creation and registration.

==== COVID-19 ====
OCCRP has investigated fraud and corruption during COVID-19 relief efforts.

==== Russian asset tracker ====
In March 2022, in response to Russia's invasion of Ukraine, the project launched the Russian asset tracker to showcase the assets of the oligarchs and other influential Russians who have links to the Russian president Vladimir Putin. In June 2022, the company revealed an investigation on LLCInvest.

==== Team Jorge ====
In February 2023, together with The Guardian and other publications, the OCCRP uncovered a vast disinformation campaign codenamed Team Jorge, organized by ex-Israeli special forces operative Tal Hanan, which is alleged to have conducted electoral meddling in more than 30 countries over the course of several years.

==== NarcoFiles ====
In November 2023, the OCCRP joined with more than 40 media partners including Cerosetenta / 070, Vorágine, the Centro Latinoamericano de Investigación Periodística (CLIP) and Distributed Denial of Secrets and journalists in 23 countries and territories for the largest investigative project on organized crime to originate in Latin America, producing the 'NarcoFiles' report. The investigation was based on more than seven million emails from the Colombian prosecutor's office which had been hacked by Guacamaya, including correspondence with embassies and authorities around the world. The files dated from 2001 to 2022 and included audio clips, PDFs, spreadsheets, and calendars. The investigation revealed new details about the global drug trade and over 44 tons of "controlled deliveries" carried out to infiltrate the drug trade and how criminals corrupt politicians, bankers, accountants, lawyers, law enforcement agents, hackers, logistics experts, and journalists in order to use logistical, financial, and digital infrastructures.

==== Cyprus Confidential ====
In November 2023, the International Consortium of Investigative Journalists, Paper trail media and 69 media partners including Distributed Denial of Secrets and the OCCRP and more than 270 journalists in 55 countries and territories produced the 'Cyprus Confidential' report on the financial network which supports the regime of Vladimir Putin, mostly with connections to Cyprus, and showed Cyprus to have strong links with high-up figures in the Kremlin, some of whom have been sanctioned. Government officials including Cyprus president Nikos Christodoulides and European lawmakers began responding to the investigation's findings in less than 24 hours, calling for reforms and launching probes.

==== Uzbekistan ====
According to the OCCRP, Vlast, and iStories, Uzbekistan's exports to Russia have increased significantly since the start of the full-scale invasion of Ukraine (February 24, 2022), including cotton pulp and nitrocellulose. These components are key in the manufacture of explosives and gunpowder. At least two large Uzbek exporters worked with Russian military-industrial complex enterprises, and at least three Russian companies − Bina Group, Khimtrade and Lenakhim − sold Uzbek cotton pulp in Russia to military plants under US sanctions.

==== Bangladesh BSEC Chairman Bribe Scandal ====
OCCRP has investigate on head of Bangladesh's capital markets regulator, Shibli Rubayat ul Islam, received payments from a bank account allegedly used in a $13-million fraud. Based on this investigation by Zulkarnain Saer Khan, the accused Shibli has been arrested and Anti-Corruption Commission of Bangladesh filed a case.

==== Dubai Unlocked ====
In May 2024, OCCRP coordinated the publication of Dubai Unlocked, an investigative series involving more than 70 media outlets. Based on leaked data provided by the Center for Advanced Defense Studies (C4ADS), the project documented ownership of hundreds of thousands of properties in Dubai. The investigation identified individuals, including alleged criminals, fugitives, political figures, and sanctioned persons, who collectively owned over 1,000 properties, suspected to be purchased with proceeds from corruption or other crimes.

==== The Steward Files ====
In 2024, approximately 300,000 internal documents from Steward Health Care were leaked to OCCRP. The files were shared with The Boston Globe and The Times of Malta and revealed financial irregularities and management issues within the hospital chain. The investigation highlighted payments to consultants and lobbying efforts linked to government contracts and raised concerns about hospital administration practices.

==== Scam Empire ====
In March 2025, Scam Empire was published. A collaborative investigative project coordinated by OCCRP, Swedish Television (SVT), and 32 media outlets around the world. The investigation, based on 1.9 terabytes of data provided by a whistleblower, examined two call center operations involved in large-scale investment activities. Reporting indicated these operations affected more than 32,000 people across 33 countries, involving at least $275 million in transactions. The call centers were located in Israel, Eastern Europe, and Georgia.

==== Bad Practice ====
Bad Practice is an international investigative project led by OCCRP, in collaboration with Norway's VG and The Times (UK). The October 2025 investigation examined how doctors who lost their medical licenses for serious wrongdoing were able to relocate and continue practicing in other countries. The investigation highlighted shortcomings in cross-border information sharing through the Internal Market Information System (IMI) and led European authorities to review cases of doctors continuing to practice despite previous sanctions. Regulatory bodies in the United Kingdom, Germany, Cyprus, Spain, and Norway confirmed they were examining individual cases in their jurisdictions.

=== Person of the Year Award ===
Since 2012, OCCRP has highlighted extreme criminal activity through the Person of the Year Award that "recognizes the individual or institution that has done ... the most to advance organized criminal activity and corruption in the world".

List of Previous Winners

- 2012 – Ilham Aliyev, President of Azerbaijan – Other mentions: Naser Kelmendi, Milo Đukanović, Vladimir Putin, Miroslav Mišković, Islam Karimov, Darko Šarić
- 2013 – Parliament of Romania – Other mentions: Darko Šarić, Gulnara Karimova
- 2014 – Vladimir Putin, President of the Russian Federation – Other mentions: Viktor Orbán, Milo Đukanović
- 2015 – Milo Đukanović, Prime Minister of Montenegro – Other mentions: First Family of Azerbaijan, Nikola Gruevski
- 2016 – Nicolás Maduro, President of Venezuela – Other mentions: Rodrigo Duterte, Bashar al-Assad, ISIL/ISIS, Raúl Castro/Luis Alberto Rodríguez, Vladimir Putin
- 2017 – Rodrigo Duterte, President of the Philippines – Other mentions: Jacob Zuma, Robert Mugabe
- 2018 – Danske Bank (as Actor of the Year, because it is a company, not a human), for the money laundering scandal – Other mentions: Vladimir Putin, Viktor Orbán, Mohammed bin Salman, Donald Trump
- 2019 – Joseph Muscat, for the flourishing of criminality and corruption under his leadership as Prime Minister of Malta – Other mentions: Donald Trump, Rudy Giuliani, Denis-Christel Sassou Nguesso
- 2020 – Jair Bolsonaro, President of Brazil, for "surrounding himself with corrupt figures, using propaganda to promote his populist agenda, undermining the justice system, and waging a destructive war against the Amazon region that has enriched some of the country’s worst land owners." – Other mentions: President of the United States Donald Trump, President of Turkey Recep Erdoğan, and Ihor Kolomoyskyi
- 2021 – Alexander Lukashenko, President of Belarus, "in recognition of all he has done to advance organized criminal activity and corruption." – Other mentions: Former President of Afghanistan Ashraf Ghani, President of Syria Bashar al-Assad, President of Turkey Recep Tayyip Erdoğan, Former Chancellor of Austria Sebastian Kurz
- 2022 – Yevgeny Prigozhin, a Russian oligarch and mercenary leader, "for his tireless efforts to “extend Russia's vicious and corrupt reach, to steal for Vladimir Putin, and to punish those who resist.”" – Other mentions: European Court of Justice, President of Turkey Recep Tayyip Erdoğan, President of Nicaragua Daniel Ortega
- 2023 – María Consuelo Porras, Attorney-General of Guatemala, for "derailing democracy, working to keep the corrupt government in power by overseeing efforts to prevent president elect Bernardo Arévalo from assuming office, and brutally persecuting honest prosecutors, journalists, and activists." – Other mentions: President of Turkey Recep Tayyip Erdoğan, Prime Minister of Bangladesh Sheikh Hasina
- 2024 – Bashar al-Assad, 2000–2024 President of Syria – Other mentions: President of Kenya William Ruto, former President of Indonesia Joko Widodo, President of Nigeria Bola Tinubu, former Prime Minister of Bangladesh Sheikh Hasina, Gautam Adani

Drew Sullivan said that Philippines President Rodrigo Duterte "has made a mockery of rule of law in his country. While he is not your typical corrupt leader, he has empowered corruption in an innovative way. His death squads have allegedly focused on criminals but, in fact, are less discriminating. He has empowered a bully-run system of survival of the fiercest. In the end, the Philippines are more corrupt, more cruel, and less democratic."

=== Daily Updates ===
The website of the organization provides daily updates about alleged instances of corruption and organized crime around the world.

=== OCCRP Aleph ===
OCCRP Aleph is an investigative data platform containing an archive of government records and open databases. OCCRP grants access to journalists and activists on a case-by-case basis.

=== Luxembourg ultimate beneficial owner database ===
The UBO register does not allow search-by-owner-name, only company name or registration number. OCCRP received, from Le Monde, 3.3 million documents about 140,000 Luxembourg companies, scraped from the registry. Reporting about this are:

- Le Monde (France)
- IrpiMedia (Investigative reporting project Italy) (Italy)
- IStories.media (Russia)
- Arab Reporters for Investigative Journalism (Middle East)
- KRIK.rs (Serbia)
- Bivol.bg (Bulgaria)
- Investigace.cz (Czech Republic)
- Süddeutsche Zeitung (Germany)
- Le Soir (Belgium)
- Woxx (Luxembourg)
- McClatchy/Miami Herald/El Nuevo Herald (U.S.)
- Revista Piauí (Brazil)
- Tempo (Indonesia)
- Armando.Info (Venezuela)
- La Nacion (Argentina)
- Inkyfada.com (Tunisia)
- Infolibre.es (Spain)

=== Global Anti-Corruption Consortium ===
The Global Anti-Corruption Consortium (GACC) is a partnership that brings together investigative reporting from the Organized Crime and Corruption Reporting Project (OCCRP) and advocacy driven by Transparency International (TI). TI uses evidence from OCCRP's corruption investigations to inform and strengthen policy and legal advocacy.

OCCRP's 2017 Azerbaijani Laundromat investigation revealed a US$2.9 billion money-laundering operation and slush fund run by Azerbaijan's ruling elite. Run through four shell companies registered in the UK, with billions passing through Danske Bank – Denmark's biggest bank – the laundered money was used to influence European politicians and representatives of international organizations, including delegates to the Parliamentary Assembly of the Council of Europe (PACE) — Europe's most significant human rights body. TI rallied public pressure, presented European and national policymakers with evidence of reputation laundering and advocated for an independent investigation into allegations of corruption at the PACE. Resignations at the highest levels of the PACE followed almost immediately. A year later, PACE's independent external investigation found numerous breaches of codes of conduct and, in some cases, corrupt activities.

== Organization and funding ==
Organized Crime and Corruption Reporting Project (OCCRP) is a registered name of the Journalism Development Network (JDN), a Maryland-based 501(c)(3) organization. OCCRP is governed by a board of directors: Marina Gorbis, David Boardman, Anders Alexandersson, Sue Gardner, Marietje Schaake, Attila Biro, Tifani Roberts, Drew Sullivan and Paul Radu.

OCCRP's stated mission to spread and strengthen investigative journalism around the world and expose crime and corruption so the public can hold power to account.

OCCRP include the Center for Investigative Reporting (Bosnia and Herzegovina) (CIN) in Sarajevo, the RISE Project in Bucharest, the Centar za istraživačko novinarstvo − Serbia (CINS) in Belgrade, Investigative Journalists of Armenia (HETQ) in Yerevan, the Bulgarian Investigative Journalism Center in Sofia, Átlátszó.hu in Budapest, MANS in Montenegro, Re:Baltica in Riga, SCOOP-Macedonia in Skopje, Bivol.bg in Bulgaria, Slidstvo.info in Ukraine, The Czech Center for Investigative Reporting in Prague and RISE Moldova in Chișinău, Studio Monitori, iFact, and GMC in Tbilisi in Georgia, the Belarusian Investigative Center in exile in Poland, among several others. It is also partnered with Novaya Gazeta in Moscow and the Kyiv Post in Kyiv. New member centers were added to the OCCRP Network between 2015 and 2016, including the Investigative Reporting Project Italy (IRPI), Direkt36 in Hungary, Slidstvo.info in Ukraine, and DOSSIER in Austria.

OCCRP's annual budget was $22.1 million in 2023. In 2024, it was reported that OCCRP receives nearly half its funding from the United States government via USAID.. Under the funding agreement, the funds cannot be used for investigations in the US. USAID also has veto powers over appointments of senior personnel at OCCRP through this funding agreement. Asked about these terms, OCCRP responded, "We are confident that no government or donor has exerted editorial control over the OCCRP reporting". The accuracy of the allegations is disputable. As an American non-profit organization, OCCRP has publicly disclosed their revenue sources, and shares its donors on its website including specific funding levels by the US government. Contracts with USAID explicitly stated "OCCRP retains sole control over the editorial processes during the performance of this agreement …. [OCCRP] will solely decide which stories it reports and publishes[.]” Additionally, USAID did not have broad veto power over key OCCRP personnel. Rather, there was boilerplate language in several grants that in the event of certain logistical personnel leaving mid-grant, the appointed replacements would need to be approved by USAID. This language is standard for this grant type and used across government agencies. There are no documented instances of USAID opposing any such appointments. Lastly, charges that OCCRP cannot use USAID funding for investigations in the US are true. However, this is in line with their general conflict of interest policies, wherein funds originating from a particular country do not support reporting on that country.

The largest donor in 2023 was the government of the United States, which provides slightly less than half of the annual funding via USAID, the National Endowment for Democracy and the Department of State. Other donors which provided undisclosed amounts, were the governments of France, the United Kingdom, Sweden, Switzerland and Slovakia, as well as the Dutch Postcode Lottery, Ford Foundation, the International Center for Journalists (ICFJ), Google Ideas, Open Society Foundations (OSF) and the Knight Foundation.

Following the January 2025 defunding of USAID by the Trump administration, OCCRP sued the US government in February 2025 for withholding funding appropriated by Congress. In September 2025 on its emergency docket, the Supreme Court ruled on the consolidated case (Department of State v. AIDS Vaccine Advocacy Coalition) by allowed the funding freeze to continue, resulting in appropriated funds expiring at the end of the fiscal year. As a result, OCCRP has implemented pay cuts and reduced its workforce by roughly 20%.

== Awards and recognition ==
In 2025, OCCRP won the Maria Ressa Prize for Courage in Investigative Journalism from the Philip Merrill College of Journalism, which noted that the organization has "developed an impressive track record of taking on many of the most important and dangerous investigative reporting projects in the world."

OCCRP was one of five finalists for the 2025 "100&Change," a MacArthur Foundation competition for a $100 million grant to fund a single proposal that "promises real and measurable progress in solving a critical problem of our time."

In 2025, OCCRP also participated in The Shadow Fleet Secrets, an investigation led by Follow the Money, which won the prize. OCCRP contributed to two investigations that won the Daphne Caruana Galizia Prize for Journalism. In 2021, The Pegasus Project, coordinated by the Forbidden Stories Consortium, including OCCRP, won the award.

In 2023 OCCRP and its media partners received the European Press Prize Innovation Award for Russian Asset Tracker, a project documenting the wealth held by Russian oligarchs outside Russia. OCCRP won the 2015 European Press Prize Special Award for its work, with the judges saying "the OCCRP is a memorably motivated, determined force for good everywhere it operates. Its members do not get rich, but the societies they serve are richer and cleaner for the scrutiny only true, independent journalism can provide."

It won the 2015 Investigative Reporters and Editors Tom Renner award for "The Khadija Project," an initiative to continue the work of imprisoned OCCRP/RFE reporter Khadija Ismayilova. It has been a finalist for three years running for the International Consortium of Investigative Journalists' Daniel Pearl Award for Outstanding International Investigative Reporting. It was a 2010 finalist for its project on the illegal document trade. It won the 2011 Daniel Pearl Award for its project "Offshore Crime, Inc.", a series of stories documenting offshore tax havens, the criminals who use them and millions of dollars in lost tax money. It was again a finalist in 2013 for its story about an international money laundering ring called the Proxy Platform.

It won the Global Shining Light Award in 2008 for investigative reporting under duress for its series on energy traders. OCCRP was double finalist for the same award in 2013 for its stories on the first family of Montenegro's bank, "First Family, First Bank". It won the award for its stories on the first family of Azerbaijan's ownership of major companies in that country. It partnered with the International Consortium of Investigative Journalists for a project on tobacco smuggling that won the Overseas Press Club Award and Investigative Reporters and Editors's Tom Renner Award for crime reporting.

In 2017, NGO Advisor ranked it 69th in the world in their annual list of the 500 best NGOs. In 2019 OCCRP received a Global Shining Light Award Citation of Excellence from the Global Investigative Journalism Network for its story entitled The Azerbaijani Laundromat.

== Khadija Ismayilova ==
OCCRP and Radio Free Europe/Radio Liberty journalist Khadija Ismayilova, based in Baku, Azerbaijan was blackmailed by an unknown party with video captured in her bedroom using a camera installed in the wall. The camera was planted two days after OCCRP/RFERL published a story by Ismayilova about the presidential family in Azerbaijan and how it secretly owned Azerfon, a mobile phone company with a monopoly 3G license. A note threatened to show the videos if Ismayilova did not "behave". She went public about the threats and the videos were shown on at least two websites. Ismayilova said that "the evidence shows that the government agencies were involved in the crime and prosecutor’s office fails to act as an independent investigative body".

After this incident, Ismayilova published articles stating that the first family also owned shares in six major goldfields and they owned one of the construction companies that built the new showcase Crystal Hall auditorium in Baku, the site of the 2012 Eurovision Song Contest. In September 2015, Ismayilova was sentenced to 7.5 years in prison. Radio Free Europe/Radio Liberty wrote that the charges were "widely viewed as being trumped up in retaliation for her reports linking family members of Azerbaijani President Ilham Aliyev to massive business and real estate holdings". Amal Clooney offered to act as her lawyer.

OCCRP started the Khadija Project, an investigative reporting effort to continue Ismayilova's work.

From 2016 to the present (2021), OCCRP's website has been permanently blocked in Azerbaijan by the Aliev government, without any court decision.

In January 2019, the European Court of Human Rights ruled that the Azerbaijan government failed to properly investigate a 2012 "sex video" and the subsequent threats of its public disclosure.

== See also ==
- Center for Public Integrity (United States)
- Distributed Denial of Secrets
- European Investigative Collaborations
- International Consortium of Investigative Journalists
