= Peter, son of Petenye =

Medieval Hungarian nobleman

Ispán of Zemplén
- Reign: 1312–1317
- Predecessor: Amadeus Aba (?)
- Successor: Philip Drugeth
- Died: between 1318 and 1321
- Issue: Peter
- Father: Petenye

Peter, son of Petenye (Hungarian: Petenye fia Péter, Slovak: Peter Peteň; died 1318/1321) was a Hungarian lord at the turn of the 13th and 14th centuries. Initially a loyal supporter of King Charles I, he turned against the royal power and established a de facto independent province in Zemplén County after 1312, exploiting that political vacuum, which emerged following the dissolution of the Abas' dominion.

== Early life ==
There is nothing known about his origin and family relationships. Historian Tamás Kádár assumes a possible Slavic (Ruthenian) descent. Ukrainian historian Myroslav Voloshchuk emphasized that most of Peter's landholdings had Slavic names, because the area was inhabited by Ruthenians. His father was a certain Petenye (also Petene or Pethune), who served as Master of the treasury in the court of Elizabeth, spouse of junior king Stephen from 1264 to 1270. The family's landholdings laid in the surrounding lordship of Patak Castle (today ruins near Sátoraljaújhely). Historian Jenő Szűcs claimed that Peter's namesake great-grandfather ("Peter I") owned Vécse (today Vojčice, Slovakia) by 1217 (while others argue it referred to a member of the Aba clan from the Tarján branch). Accordingly, four generations bore the same forename in the upcoming decades. His son, Peter II ("the Freckled") bought Albény and Tehna with the permission of King Béla IV in 1245. Szűcs argued this was the first step in the development of the Gálszécs lordship (today Sečovce, Slovakia), the core of Peter, son of Petenye's dominion. These lands were part of the so-called "gyepűelve", a mostly uninhabited or sparsely inhabited area beyond the eastern border of the Kingdom of Hungary. Voloshchuk argued this Peter belonged to the retinue of Rostislav Mikhailovich prior that, who failed to acquire the throne of Galicia in 1245. Accordingly, this Peter, a prominent noble from the Rus', arrived to Hungary after the defeat. A charter of the Eger Chapter from 1297 states that Peter, son of Petenye resided in the village called Pethune in Nógrád County.

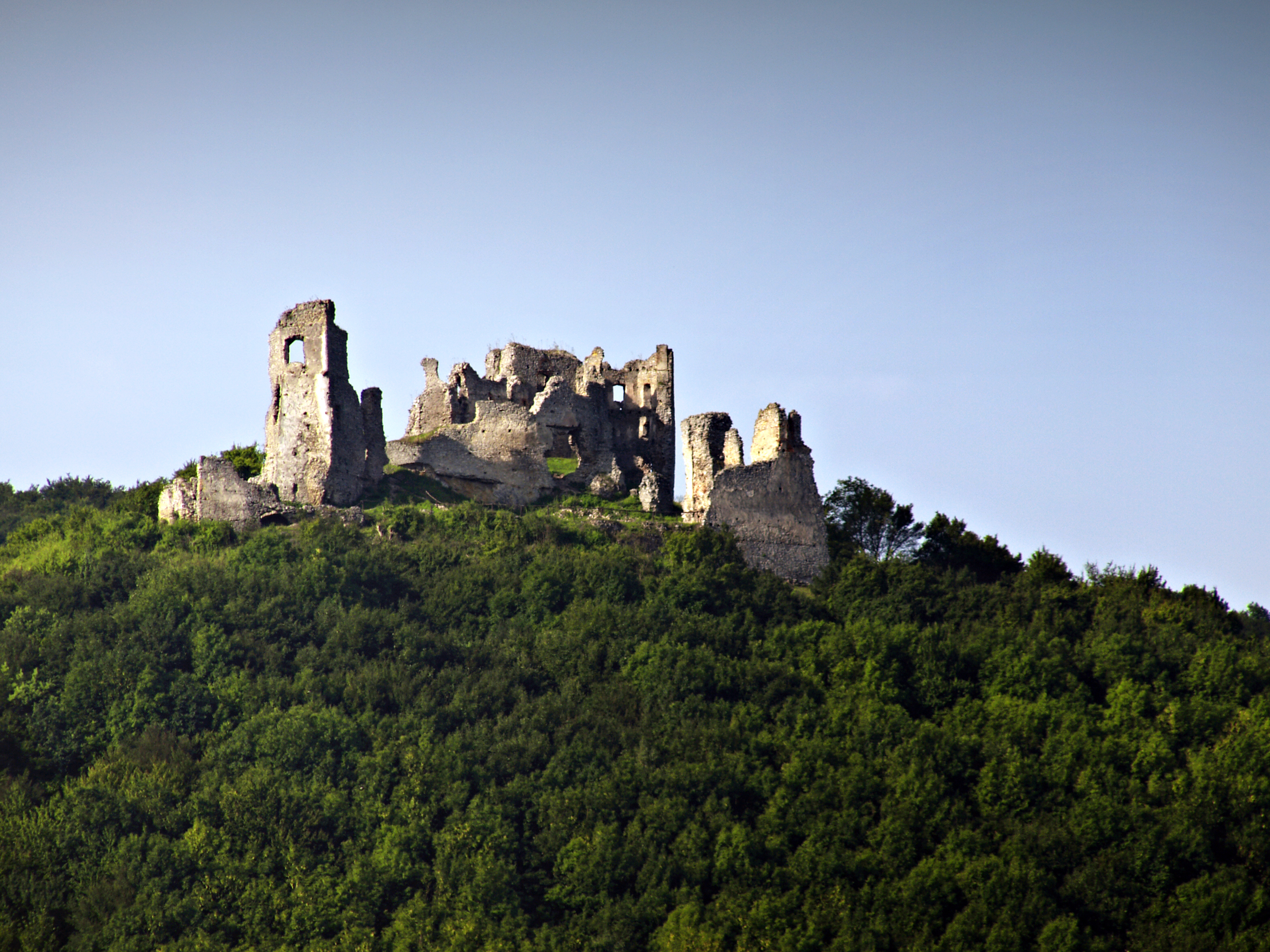
Ruins of Brekov (Barkó) Castle

Peter, son of Petenye first appeared in contemporary authentic charters since 1283, during the reign of Ladislaus IV, although a false diploma already mentioned him in 1263. In that year (1283), Ladislaus IV donated him the so-called Veker's Gate near the Veker (today Krivošťanka) Mountains, once an important part of the Hungarian border system in the eastern territories. It is possible he was granted the land for his participation in the Battle on the Marchfeld (1278). Alongside Reynold Básztély, former Palatine of Hungary and a certain James, he served as noble judge (Hungarian: szolgabíró; lit. "servants' judge") of Zemplén County sometimes after 1289 (some historians dated to around 1286 and 1291). He appeared in various lawsuits and land contracts in the 1290s. For instance, he protested against the induction of one of the applicants to the ownership of Visnyó (present-day Višňov, Slovakia) in 1296, before the court of Amadeus Aba. By 1297, Peter owned Gálszécs (or Szécs), the territorial centre of his landholdings. The village of Szőllőske also belonged to his property as an "inherited land" in 1298, in addition to an exchanged land, Zebegnyő (today Zbehňov, Slovakia), acquiring from his relatives, a certain Matthias and his brothers, sons of Conrad. By 1308, when petra charter referred to the lordship as "land beyond Terebes" (today Trebišov, Slovakia), he owned several villages and estates between the Bodrog and Tisza rivers (the region of Bodrogköz), for instance Rozvágy, Salamon (today Solomonovo, Ukraine), Záhony, Kiszte, Kásó (today Kysta and Kašov in Slovakia, respectively). When Charles I confiscated Peter's lands in 1317, the Gálszécs lordship consisted of 18 villages.

Possibly in the 1290s, Peter built the castle of Borostyán, which later became his provincial seat and 17 villages and lands belonged to it. Beside that, he also owned Jeszenő Castle (today Jasenov, Slovakia) since 1283, after it was confiscated from the rebellious Joachim Gutkeled's family. In 1307, he acquired Barkó Castle (today ruins above Brekov, Slovakia) from the Kaplon clan during an estate contract. Sometimes before 1312, he also became owner of the Bodrogszög Castle, which laid somewhere near present-day Klin nad Bodrogom, Slovakia.

== Lord of Zemplén ==
=== Provincial lord ===
Amadeus Aba and his kinship ruled de facto independently the northern and north-eastern counties, including Zemplén, of the kingdom since the 1290s, during the era of feudal anarchy. It is possible that Peter was among his familiares, thus he was able to maintain some degree of autonomy. After the extinction of the Árpád dynasty in 1301, when a succession war broke out, Amadeus Aba supported Charles of Anjou's claim to the Hungarian throne, thus Peter also joined his camp. Charles became the undisputed ruler of the whole kingdom by 1310. The burghers of Kassa (now Košice in Slovakia) assassinated Amadeus Aba in September 1311. After that Charles was committed to eradicating the Abas' oligarchic rule. However, Amadeus' sons rebelled against the king and entered into an alliance with the powerful oligarch Matthew Csák. Then Peter decided to left the Abas' allegiance and swore loyalty to Charles. In late 1311 or early 1312, when the Aba troops raided Sárospatak, the fort was successfully defended by the own militia of Peter and members of the Baksa kindred. Peter was seriously injured in the clash. A royal charter issued on 10 April 1312 narrated that one of Amadeus' sons, Nicholas Aba took revenge on Peter for his defection, and his troops looted and devastated the Gálszécs lordship (possibly in the spring of 1312). During the skirmish, the local church was destroyed, where all accumulated wealth were plundered, causing the damage of 1,000 gold ducats for Peter. In addition, his manor was set on fire by the Abas, when Peter's unidentified wife stayed there, while one of his relatives, also a Peter, was killed. Following that Peter participated in the siege of Sáros Castle (today Šariš in Slovakia), when Charles' army seized the fort from the Aba-ally Zólyom (Balassa) kinship. As a partial compensation, Peter was granted the land of Pihnye (present-day Pichne, Slovakia) from Charles I, who previously confiscated the estate from the treacherous sons of a certain Iroszló (Jarosław).

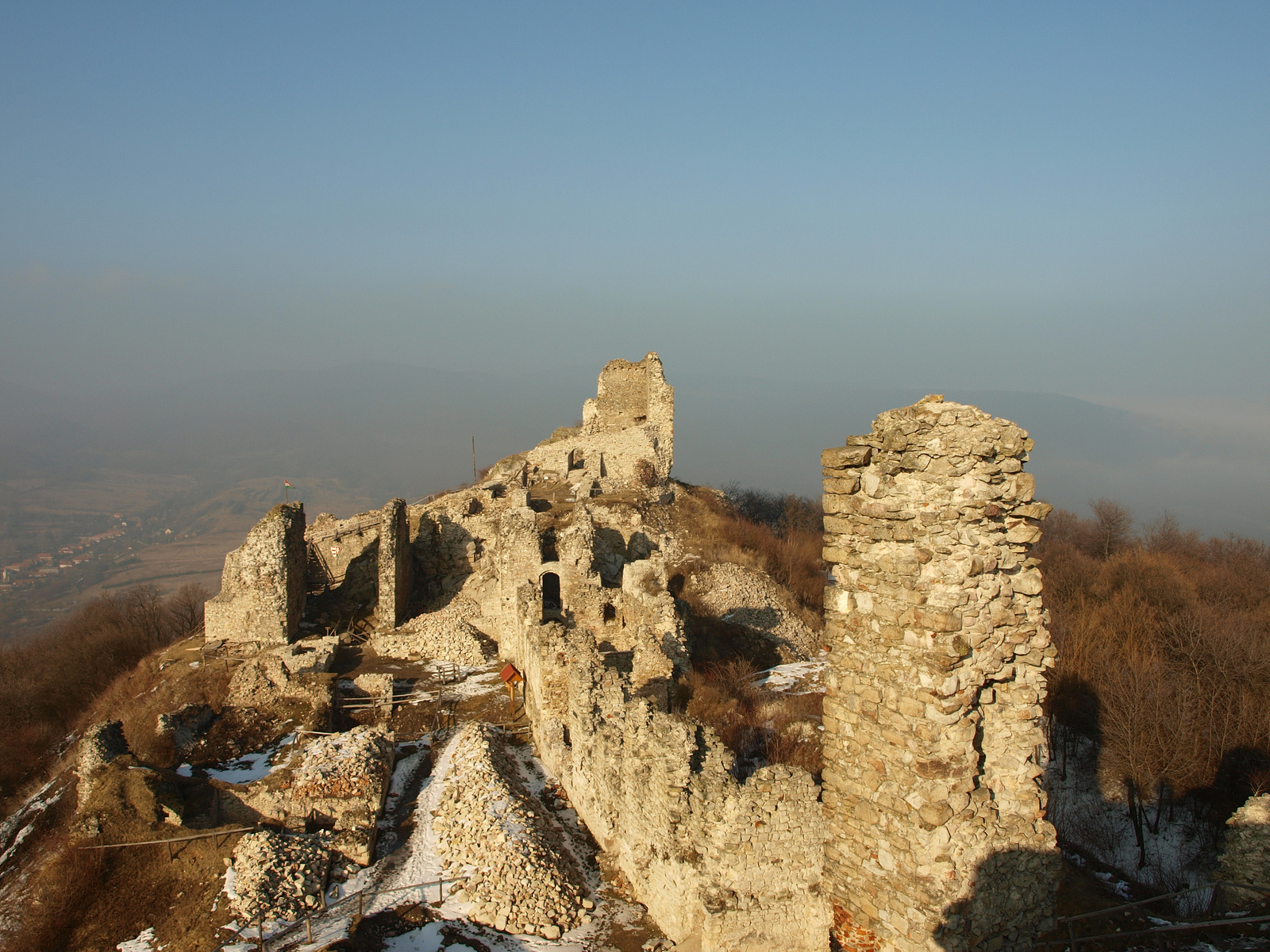
Ruins of Regéc Castle

Following the Battle of Rozgony on 15 June 1312, Peter and his servants presumably participated, which brought an end to the Aba family's rule in Northeast Hungary, Peter was made ispán of Zemplén and Ung counties by Charles I. As part of his dignities' honor, he was also granted the castles of Gönc (Amadeus Aba's former seat) and Regéc, where he served as castellan (with the title of comes). Kádár questions the latter position. A later source from 1345 refers to him as "ban", thus he possibly held a such dignity sometime between 1312 and 1315, or it was an honorary title. According to historian Gyula Kristó, Peter exploited that political vacuum, which emerged following the dissolution of the Abas' dominion in the upcoming years, and began to establish a de facto independent province in Zemplén and partly Abaúj counties. Thus Kristó considered him one of the so-called "oligarchs" or "provincial lords". Peter continually distanced himself from the royal power and entered as a local tyrant against the neighbouring noblemen. For instance, he plundered the lands of the royalist Nagymihályis (descendants of the Kaplon kindred) in late 1315. He cooperated with his former enemies, the sons of the late Amadeus Aba, and their joint troops besieged and destroyed the castles of Györke and Nagymihály (today Ďurkov and Michalovce in Slovakia, respectively). Peter's henchmen also tortured and murdered some of the Nagymihályis' relatives and servants. Peter possessed approximately 50 villages and six castles by that time. In November 1316, it was reported the members of the Rozgonyi family (Básztély clan) have been "defending Csicsva Castle [today part of Sedliská, Slovakia] for almost a year" against Peter's banderium.

=== Rebellion against Charles ===
Peter, son of Petenye was first referred to as "disloyal" by Charles I on 2 January 1317. The royal charter reported James Borsa, a former Palatine of Hungary, who turned against Charles, had made an alliance against the king with other lords, including his son-in-law Mojs Ákos, the Gutkeleds of Szilágyság (Sălaj) and Peter himself in the second half of 1316. The motivation of Peter's betrayal is unclear. According to Serbian historian Đura Hardi, he turned against Charles I because the king favored his Neapolitan courtiers, the Drugeth family – Peter's local competitors – by granting large landholdings in the eastern counties. In the charter, Charles confiscated some of his lands and estates and handed them over to his loyal soldier Mikcs Ákos, who suffered serious damages in his clashes against Peter (for instance, one of his familiares was killed). Among the lands confiscated were Sztracsina, Kékmező, Nagydomása, Kisdomása and Gereginye (present-day Stročín, Kuková, Veľká Domaša, Malá Domaša and Ohradzany in Slovakia, respectively).

Another document issued on 10 February 1321 narrated that after his betrayal, Peter, whose estates laid in the northeast border, traveled to the Kingdom of Rus' and offered the Hungarian crown to either Andrew or Leo II of Galicia, both were maternal great-grandchildren of Béla IV of Hungary. Historian Attila Bárány argued James Borsa and the increasingly influential Mojs Ákos supported Peter in his efforts, and he represented the whole conspiracy in the Galician royal court. Because of his potential Ruthenian ancestry and proximity to his properties, Peter had extensive and vibrant political and trade connections with the local elite in the Kingdom of Galicia–Volhynia. Tamás Kádár doubts the offer of the Hungarian throne, he considers that Peter and his allies only sought military assistance in Galicia against Charles. Peter's diplomatic mission ended unsuccessfully, both of the Rurikid princes, Andrew and Leo refused to involve in the unification of Charles, with whom they maintained good relationship (there were theories that Charles' first wife was Leo's daughter, Maria).

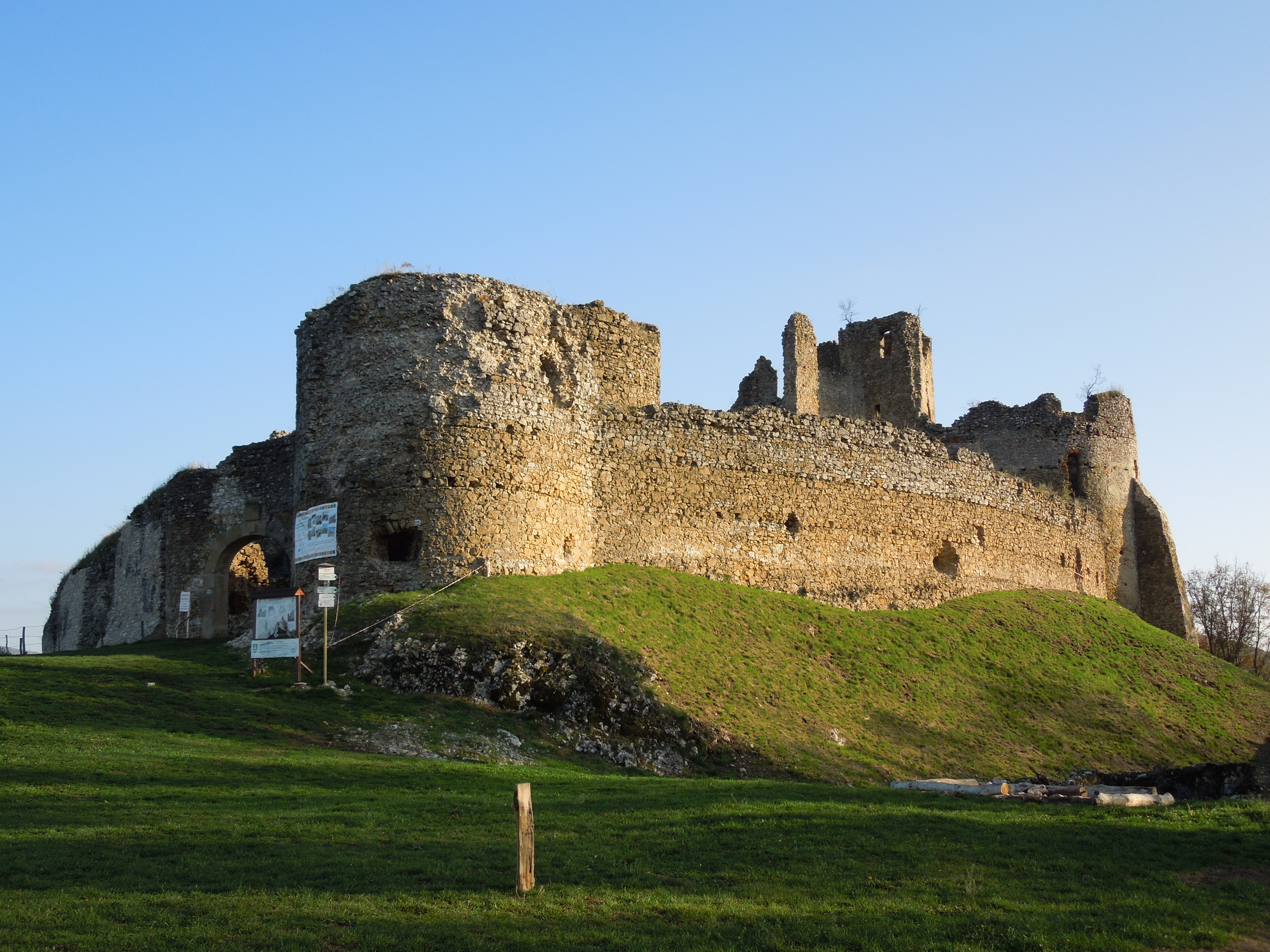
Jasenov (Jeszenő) Castle, owned by Peter since 1283

Based on a regesta found in the archives of the Drugeth family (today part of the Slovak National Archives in Prešov), Peter even attempted the assassination of Charles I twice. At first, he personally tried to kill Charles, who was sick in bed in Sárospatak, possibly when he still was considered loyal, thus he was able to present the king's companion without difficulty. Peter's attempt was revealed and captured by the king himself. István Petrovics considered this attempt took place in the last months of 1316. In contrast to Petrovics' reconstruction, Tamás Kádár argues that Peter was considered loyal even on 15 December 1316, according to a royal document. In addition, Charles resided in Southern Hungary, Temesvár and Lippa (present-day Timișoara and Lipova in Romania, respectively), in those months. If Peter's first assassination attempt happened at all, it must be occurred in the spring of 1317, as Kádár considers. Gyula Kristó questioned the validity of the royal document's narration on Peter's assassination attempt. The historian argued Charles I and his chancellery aimed to emphasize the impenitence of the traitorous Peter with the false narrative. Tamás Kádár does not share this viewpoint; he considers, instead of Peter, his commissioned assassin was captured during the first attempt. For the second time, Peter hired two assassins to murder Charles, who resided in the temporary capital Temesvár then. According to a diploma from 1355, the assassins, certain noblemen Nicholas and Philip tried to kill the king with an arrow. There was no report that whether Charles was injured during the assassination attempt, but the king exiled them and confiscated their lands in Csanád County. Petrovics argued Peter's second attempt occurred in either Spring (during his war against Charles) or Winter 1317 (after his defeat in Zemplén).

Charles immediately responded to the unfavorable developments and launched a multi-faceted war against James Borsa and his allies in early 1317. The king initiated a royal campaign first against Peter, the weakest member of the anti-Charles coalition. Philip Drugeth, who was also made ispán of Abaúj County, and Mikcs Ákos led Charles' army against Peter's forts in Ung County in the first months of 1317. Around March, Drugeth captured Gönc, then his army marched in front of Regéc Castle, also joined by Ladislaus Baksa's auxiliary troops due to a threatening leaf by Drugeth. Regéc was besieged and seized in April. In the same time, Mikcs Ákos crushed Peter's power in Zemplén, capturing the castles Barkó, Borostyán and Bodrogszög within few weeks. Peter successfully broke out of the blockade, "like an indomitable beast" (as a 1342 charter wrote) during the siege of his seat, Borostyán and fled the province. However, Mikcs captured and imprisoned Peter's (probably namesake) son and sent to the royal court as a prisoner of war. Peter's last stronghold Jeszenő was taken by Philip Drugeth in the last days of April or early May 1317.

== Later life ==
After his fall in Zemplén, Ung and Abaúj counties, there is only fragmented information about Peter. Following his defeat (or simultaneously), Charles turned against James Borsa, whose army was defeated in the first half of 1317 (historian Attila Zsoldos provided the exact date to 10 February) in Debrecen, and his fortresses were captured in the following months. James Borsa barricaded himself into the castle of Sólyomkő (now in Aleșd, Romania), but was captured by the royal troops after his surrender (possibly in May 1318), however he escaped execution and was eventually ransomed by Mojs Ákos. It is possible that Peter was captured too in Sólyomkő or earlier (his involvement in the two assassination attempts revealed only then), and later himself was also released during a ransom or exchange of prisoners between the royal court and Mojs.

In Transylvania, James Borsa and Peter, son of Petenye were both marginalized and overshadowed by Mojs, militarily the most successful enemy of Charles. When Mojs failed to prevent the king's general Dózsa Debreceni to advance into the inner parts of Transylvania at Topa, midway between the Meszes Gate and Kolozsvár (today Cluj-Napoca, Romania) in July 1318, Peter, summoning his supporters in Szatmár County, also participated in the skirmish, along with James Borsa and others. Possibly he remained in Transylvania in his remaining years and continued to struggle against the local pro-Charles noblemen in the regions of Northern Transylvania, Upper Tisza and Szamos (Someș) after the withdrawal of Dózsa Debreceni. In February 1321, Charles recalled him with "cursed memory", confirming his death by then. However Voloshchuk considered, based on a charter from 1331, that Peter took shelter in the Kingdom of Poland. His namesake son, Peter was still alive in 1335, and was possibly active in Szatmár County.

== Sources ==
- Bárány, Attila (2011). "Debreceni Dózsa küzdelme a bihari oligarchákkal [Dózsa Debreceni's Struggle with Oligarchs in Bihar]". In Bárány, Attila; Papp, Klára; Szálkai, Tamás (eds.). Debrecen város 650 éves. Várostörténeti tanulmányok (in Hungarian). Debreceni Egyetem. Történelmi Intézet. pp. 75–126. ISBN 963-821-6468.
- Engel, Pál (1988). "Az ország újraegyesítése. I. Károly küzdelmei az oligarchák ellen (1310–1323) [Reunification of the Realm. The Struggles of Charles I Against the Oligarchs (1310–1323)]". Századok (in Hungarian). 122 (1–2). Magyar Történelmi Társulat: 89–146. ISSN 0039-8098.
- Engel, Pál (1996). Magyarország világi archontológiája, 1301–1457, I. [Secular Archontology of Hungary, 1301–1457, Volume I] (in Hungarian). História, MTA Történettudományi Intézete. ISBN 963-8312-44-0.
- Kádár, Tamás (2017). "Egy megkésett tartományuraság-építési kísérlet a XIV. század eleji Magyarországon: Petenye fia Péter pályája [A Late Attempt at Sovereign Province-building in Early XIV Century Hungary: The Career of Peter, son of Petenye]". In Szolyák, Péter; Csengeri, Piroska (eds.). A Herman Ottó Múzeum Évkönyve LVI (in Hungarian). Herman Ottó Múzeum. pp. 99–111. ISSN 0544-4225.
- Kristó, Gyula (1979). A feudális széttagolódás Magyarországon [Feudal Anarchy in Hungary] (in Hungarian). Akadémiai Kiadó. ISBN 963-05-1595-4.
- Kristó, Gyula (2003). "I. Károly király harcai a tartományurak ellen (1310–1323) [The Struggles of Charles I Against the Oligarchs (1310–1323)]". Századok (in Hungarian). 137 (2). Magyar Történelmi Társulat: 297–347. ISSN 0039-8098.
- Petrovics, István (2000). "Orgyilkosok Temesvárott: merénylet I. Károly király ellen [Assassins in Temesvár: Assassination Attempts on King Charles I]". In Piti, Ferenc; Szabados, György (eds.). "Magyaroknak eleiről". Ünnepi tanulmányok a hatvan esztendős Makk Ferenc tiszteletére (in Hungarian). Szegedi Középkorász Műhely. pp. 421–434. ISBN 963-482-500-1.
- Szűcs, Jenő (1993). "Sárospatak kezdetei és a pataki erdőuradalom [The Beginnings of Sárospatak and the Royal Forest of Patak]". Történelmi Szemle (in Hungarian). 35 (1–2). Hungarian Academy of Sciences: 1–57. ISSN 0040-9634.
- Voloshchuk, Myroslav (2021). Ruthenians (the Rus') in the Kingdom of Hungary (11th to mid-14th Century): Settlement, Property, and Socio-Political Role. Leiden: Brill. ISBN 9789004469709. Archived from the original on 14 April 2023.
- Zsoldos, Attila (2011). Magyarország világi archontológiája, 1000–1301 [Secular Archontology of Hungary, 1000–1301] (in Hungarian). História, MTA Történettudományi Intézete. ISBN 978-963-9627-38-3.
- Zsoldos, Attila (2016). "Erdélyi háborúk a 14. század elején [Transylvanian Wars at the Beginning of the 14th Century]". In Pósán, László; Veszprémy, László (eds.). Elfeledett háborúk. Középkori csaták és várostromok (6–16. század) (in Hungarian). Zrínyi Kiadó. pp. 198–231. ISBN 978-963-3276-96-9.

Political offices
Preceded by Amadeus Aba (?)	Ispán of Zemplén; 1312–1317	Succeeded by Philip Drugeth
Preceded by Amadeus Aba (?)	Ispán of Ung; 1312–1313	Succeeded by Ladislaus Aba
