= 2020 Bulgarian Socialist Party leadership election =

2020 Bulgarian Socialist Party Leadership Election
← 2016	12 September 2020	2025 →
- Turnout: 67.1%
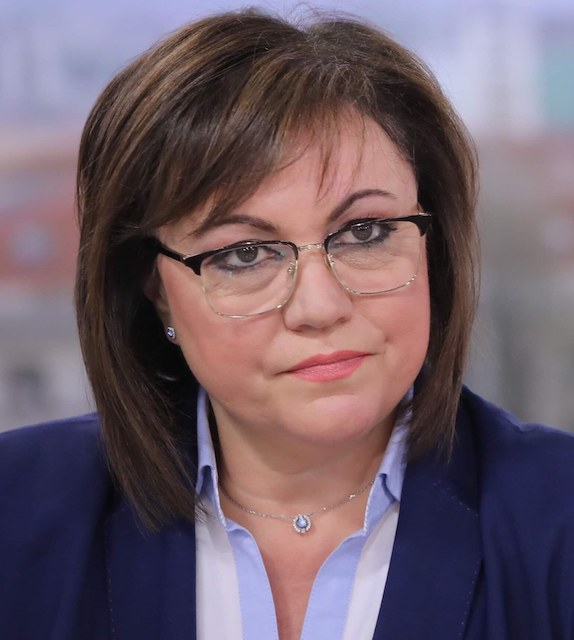

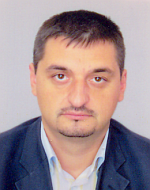
Candidate	Korneliya Ninova	Kiril Dobrev
Popular vote	43,222	7,910
Percentage	81.5%	14.9%
Leader before election
Korneliya Ninova
Elected Leader
Korneliya Ninova

Leadership elections within the Bulgarian Socialist Party were held on the 12th of September, 2020, and were the first direct elections in the history of the Bulgarian Socialist Party. They were won by incumbent chairwoman, Korneliya Ninova, in the first round.

== Candidates ==
The following individuals appeared on the finalised ballot.

Name	Experience	No. of Nominations	Notes
Korneliya Ninova (51)	MP from BSPzB (since 2009); Chairwoman of BSP (since 2016)	285	Incumbent
Kiril Dobrev (48)	MP from BSPzB (2005–2017); Member of the National Council of BSP (since 2000); Member of the Executive Council of BSP (since 2007); Deputy Chairman of BSP (since 2016)	144	
Krasimir Yankov (45)	MP from BSPzB (since 2013); Member of the National Council of BSP (since 2012); Leader of BSP-Varna(2011–2013)	55	Withdrew his candidacy prior to election day but remained on the ballot.
Valeri Zhablyanov (55)	MP from BSPzB (since 2013); Member of the National Council of BSP	34	Withdrew his candidacy prior to election day but remained on the ballot.

The following candidates were registered as candidates for the election, but withdrew and did not appear on the ballot.

- Georgi Todorov, member of the BSP National Council. Withdrew from the elections on the 10th of September and called for a boycott.

The following candidates submitted documents to participate in the elections, but their candidacy was not approved by the electoral commission due to not fulfilling the party experience requirement.

- Galina Vasileva, BSP activist.
- Irina Mihaylova, BSP activist.

The persons received a substantial number of nominations from the province, community or municipal branches of the Socialist Party, but did not submit their documents in order to run:

- Kaloyan Pargov, leader of BSP-Sofia, received 63 nominations.
- Dragomir Stoynev, MP and vice-chair of the BSPzB Parliamentary Group, received 40 nominations.
- Kostadin Paskalev, former BSP MP and Mayor of Blagoevgrad, received 36 nominations.
- Krum Zarkov, BSP MP and member of the National Council, received 34 nominations.
- Yanaki Stoilov, former BSP MP until 2017, received 23 nominations.

== Results ==
According to result data published by the BSP Electoral Commission, Ninova won in the first round of the election, gathering around 81.5% of the vote. Further, the elections were deemed as completed due to turnout of registered BSP members exceeding 50%.

Candidate	Votes	%
Korneliya Ninova	43,222	81.54
Kiril Dobrev	7,910	14.92
Krasimir Yankov	1,117	2.11
Valeri Zhablyanov	760	1.43
Total	53,009	100.00
Valid votes	53,009	98.59
Invalid/blank votes	760	1.41
Total votes	53,769	100.00
Registered voters/turnout	80,214	67.03
Source: NOVA, Free Europe Baricada

== Aftermath ==
On the 14th of September, Emil Voynov, head of the BSP Electoral Commission, announced the final results of the vote, and accredited Ninova as the elected chairwoman of the party.
