= 2014 Bulgarian Socialist Party leadership election =

- July 27th 2014
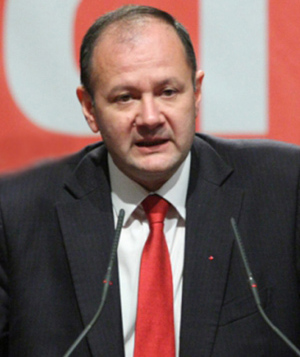
Candidate	Mihail Mikov	Dragomir Stoynev
Votes	377 (53.1%)	333 (46.9%)
Leader before election
Sergey Stanishev
Elected Leader
Mihail Mikov

Leadership elections within the Bulgarian Socialist Party were held on 27 July 2014 as part of the party's 48th congress, following the resignation of Sergey Stanishev earlier that month. While he made no formal endorsement, he hinted at supporting economy minister Dragomir Stoynev, who had been recently elected as party co-chairman.

== Background ==
Following his election as party leader in 2001 Sergey Stanishev was reelected in June 2002, November 2008, October 2009 and May 2012.

Similar to Georgi Parvanov, Stanishev and the party remained in opposition to the Sakskoburggotski Government, despite the fact that two socialist ministers had joined it as independents. The party achieved a victory in the 2005 election and formed a coalition government, however due to waning popularity and accusations of corruption, it underperformed in the 2009 election and went into opposition.

Following the 2013 election the BSP formed a coalition government with the Movement for Rights and Freedoms, which required support from the ultra-nationalist party Ataka. The government was seen as corrupt and figures from it were considered inappropriate. This led to protests, culminating in the resignations of Prime Minister Plamen Oresharski and Stanishev.

== Candidates ==
Initially party co-chairman Yanaki Stoilov was considered a frontrunner, alongside minister Dragomir Stoynev, however, following accusations directed at Stoynev, the party establishment appeared to coalesce around Mihail Mikov. Thus, both major candidates were seen as ideological successors to Stanishev. Candidates Maya Manolova, Georgi Kadiev and Korneliya Ninova advocated for change within the party.

== Results ==
The 48th party congress convened on 27 July with a total of 846 listed party delegates, 744 of whom cast votes. The first round of voting took place between 16:39 and 17:30. As no candidate received a majority, Chairman of the National Assembly and former Minister of Interior Mihail Mikov and Minister of Economy Dragomir Stoynev advanced to the second round. Members of the National Assembly Yanaki Stoilov and Korneliya Ninova placed 3rd and 4th respectively, unexpectedly surpassing Deputy Chairwoman of the National Assembly Maya Manolova.

The second round of voting took place the same day. Mihail Mikov was elected with 53.1% of the vote, or 377 of the 710 valid votes.

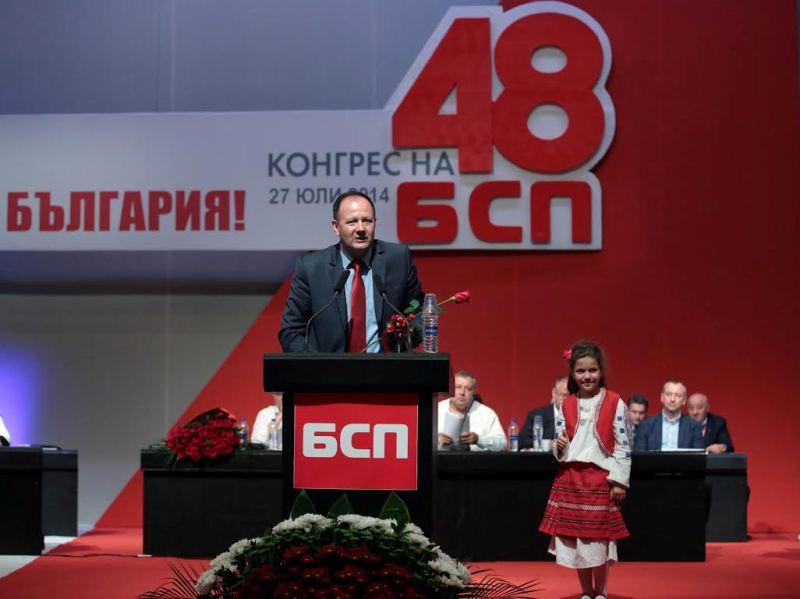
Mikov after being chosen as party chairman on the 27th of July 2014

Candidate	First round		Second round	
Candidate	Votes	%	Votes	%
Mihail Mikov	167	22.48	377	53.10
Dragomir Stoynev	126	16.96	333	46.90
Korneliya Ninova	119	16.02		
Yanaki Stoilov	103	13.86		
Maya Manolova	83	11.17		
Georgi Gergov	63	8.48		
Krasimir Yankov	46	6.19		
Georgi Kadiev	29	3.90		
Krasimir Premyanov	7	0.94		
Total	743	100.00	710	100.00
Valid votes	743	99.87	710	97.80
Invalid/blank votes	1	0.13	16	2.20
Total votes	744	100.00	726	100.00
