= 2016 Bulgarian Socialist Party leadership election =

2016 Bulgarian Socialist Party Leadership Election
← 2014	May 7-8 2016	2020 →
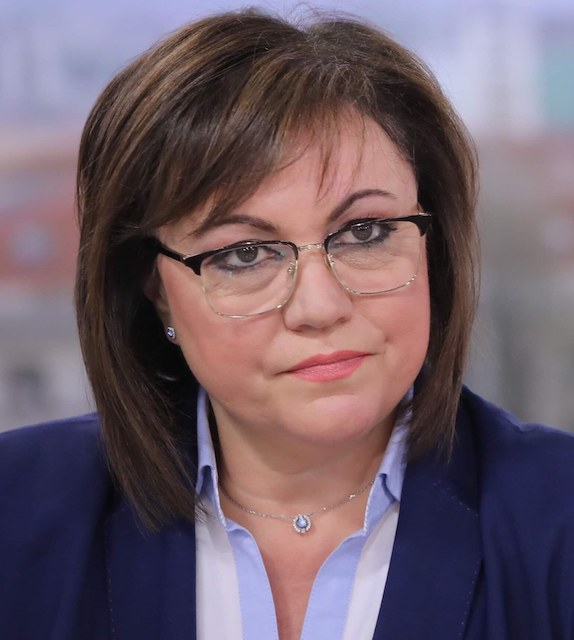

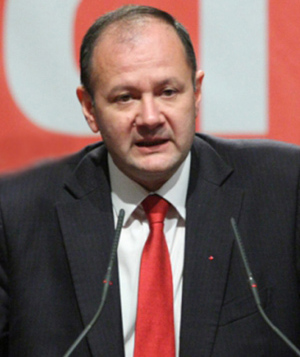
Candidate	Korneliya Ninova	Mihail Mikov
Votes	395 (53.1%)	349 (46.9%)
Leader before election
Mihail Mikov
Elected Leader
Korneliya Ninova

Leadership elections within the Bulgarian Socialist Party were held in the night between 7 and 8 May 2016 as part of the party's 49th congress. Incumbent leader Mihail Mikov originally faced a total of 31 challengers, however by the time the party congress convened on 7 May, four of them had dropped out. By the evening only 5 candidates remained.

== Candidates ==
Incumbent leader Mihail Mikov had the support of the party establishment, while MP Korneliya Ninova had received endorsements from several influential party figures and was seen as being to his right. Other challengers included MP from Varna Krasimir Yankov, leader of the BSP in Plovdiv Georgi Gergov, who was expected to endorse Ninova, and former party organisation secretary Valery Zhablyanov, who was seen as representing the party's left russophile tendencies and was expected to endorse Mikov.

== Political issues ==
In his speech to the delegates Mikov emphasized the importance of the upcoming presidential election; he called for the resignation of the current government and expressed a desire to join the Schengen Area. Ninova emphasized on changing the BSP's internal structures and attracting disenfranchised leftist voters, in view of the party's poor performance in the 2014 election.

== Results ==
A total of 782 party delegates were invited to the congress, 755 of whom cast votes. As no candidate received a majority, Mihail Mikov and Korneliya Ninova advanced to a second round. Between rounds Krasimir Yankov and Georgi Gergov, who were in 3rd and 4th place with 77 and 55 votes respectively, endorsed Ninova. Shortly after midnight it was announced that Ninova had defeated Mikov in the second round by a margin of 46 votes. This was the first time that an incumbent BSP leader had lost their reelection bid.

Candidate	First round		Second round	
Candidate	Votes	%	Votes	%
Mihail Mikov	329	43.81	349	46.91
Korneliya Ninova	280	37.28	395	53.09
Krasimir Yankov	77	10.25		
Georgi Gergov	55	7.32		
Valery Zhablyanov	10	1.33		
Total	751	100.00	744	100.00
Valid votes	751	99.47		
Invalid/blank votes	4	0.53		
Total votes	755	100.00		
