= Veľká Domaša =

Dam in Slovakia

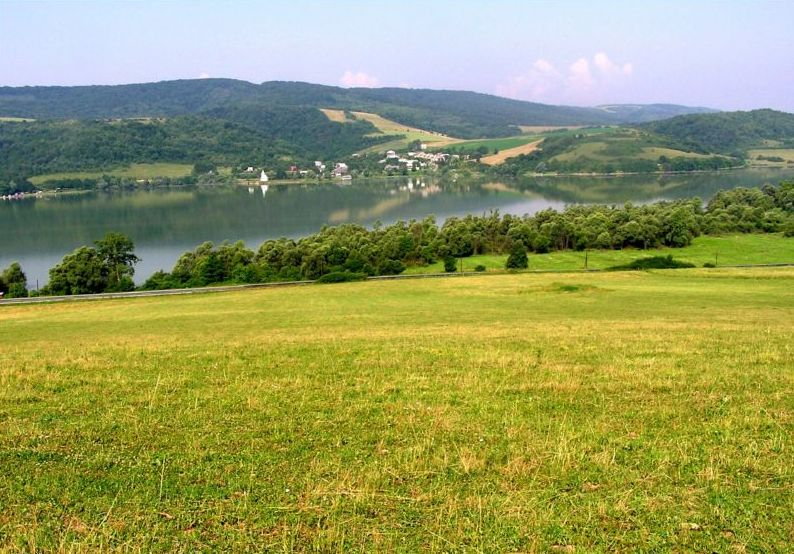
The dam close to the village of Bžany

Domaša is a dam along the Ondava River, situated in the mountains surrounding The Low Beskids, in the north of the town Vranov nad Topľou, in Eastern Slovakia.

== Geography and history ==
The Domaša Dam Lake was built by blocking the Ondava river at the village of Veľká Domaša. The villages of Dobrá nad Ondavou, Trepec, Kelča, Valkov, and Petejovce and their environs were flooded. The construction began in 1962 and was completed in 1967. The lake’s water surface, which is 14 km (8.7 mi) long, 4 km (2.5 mi) wide and between 18 and 32.5 m (59 and 107 ft) deep, covers an area of 1,510 hectares (3,700 acres).

Domaša is spread over the area of the districts of Vranov nad Topľou and Stropkov at the average altitude of 156 m (512 ft). With an agreeable climate and an average temperature of 23 °C (73 °F) it guarantees pleasant swimming in clean water from June to mid-September.

== Biology and ecology ==
The lake created by the dam is one of the few remnants of a belt of wetlands that formerly stretched from the Tisa-Danube confluence to the Vihorlat Mountains. The banks abound in a variety of water fowl, such as black stork, plover, swan, heron and duck. Representatives of some bird predators can also be spotted here.

=== Fishing ===
Fishermen can delight in calm places with rich occurrence of fish like carp, pike, eel, silver salmon or barbell. Rich fishing is available also in a neighbouring lake near the villages of Malá Domaša and Slovenská Kajňa.

== Tourism ==
The lake, surrounded by rolling hills, offers wide possibilities of recreation and water sports. The right bank of the lake is covered by forests, and on the opposite side woods alternate with meadows. The area is highly suitable for mushroom-pickers, hunters and lovers of long hikes in the country.

There are five holiday destinations: Dobrá, Poľany, Holčíkovce, Nová Kelča and Valkov. Its western bank is accessible from Prešov through Hanušovce nad Topľou by a 10 km (6.2 mi) long road leading through beech forests of the Low Beskids and ending in the Dobrá recreation centre.

== Infrastructure ==
Along the lake's eastern bank runs the main road from Vranov nad Topľou through Stropkov to Dukla, a Slovak – Polish border crossing. The same road offers access to the Poľany, Holčíkovce and Nová Kelča recreation centres. From the towns of Giraltovce, Stropkov and Svidník there is another access route to the two recreation centres on the western bank of the lake, Bžany and Valkov. Each centre provides a network of shopping services, public toilets, drinking water supply, sports equipment rentals and parking lots.

== Gallery ==
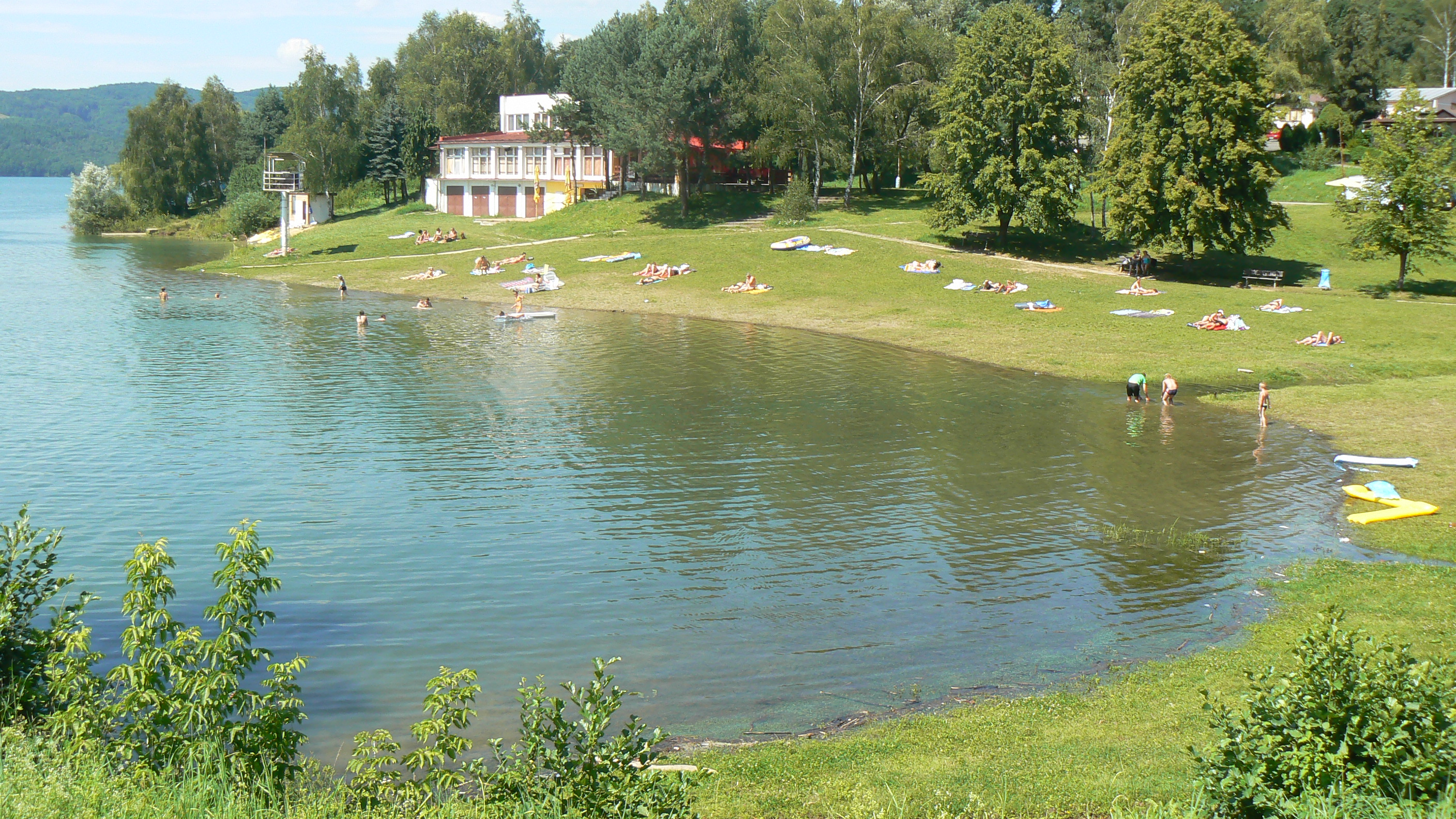

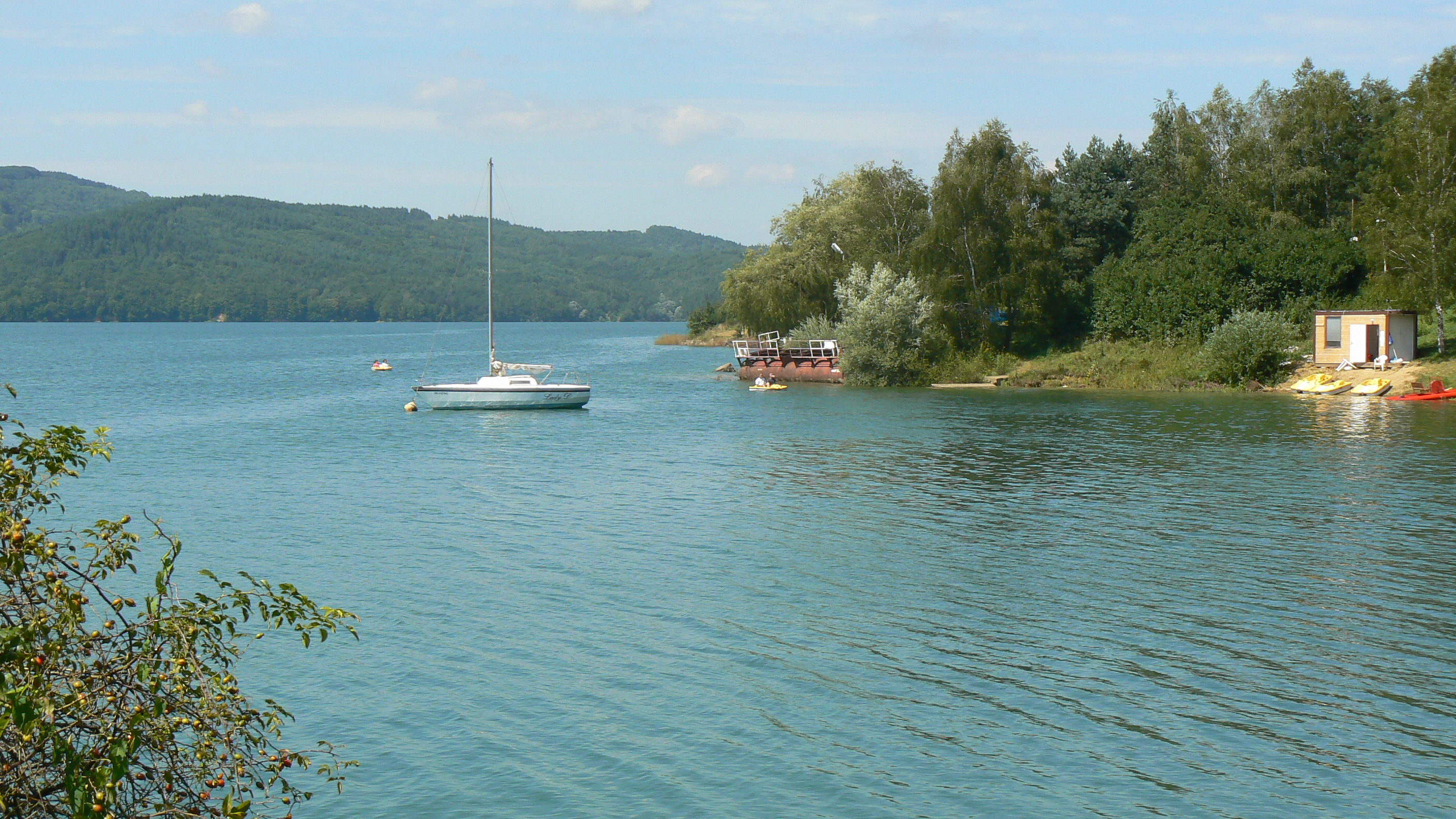

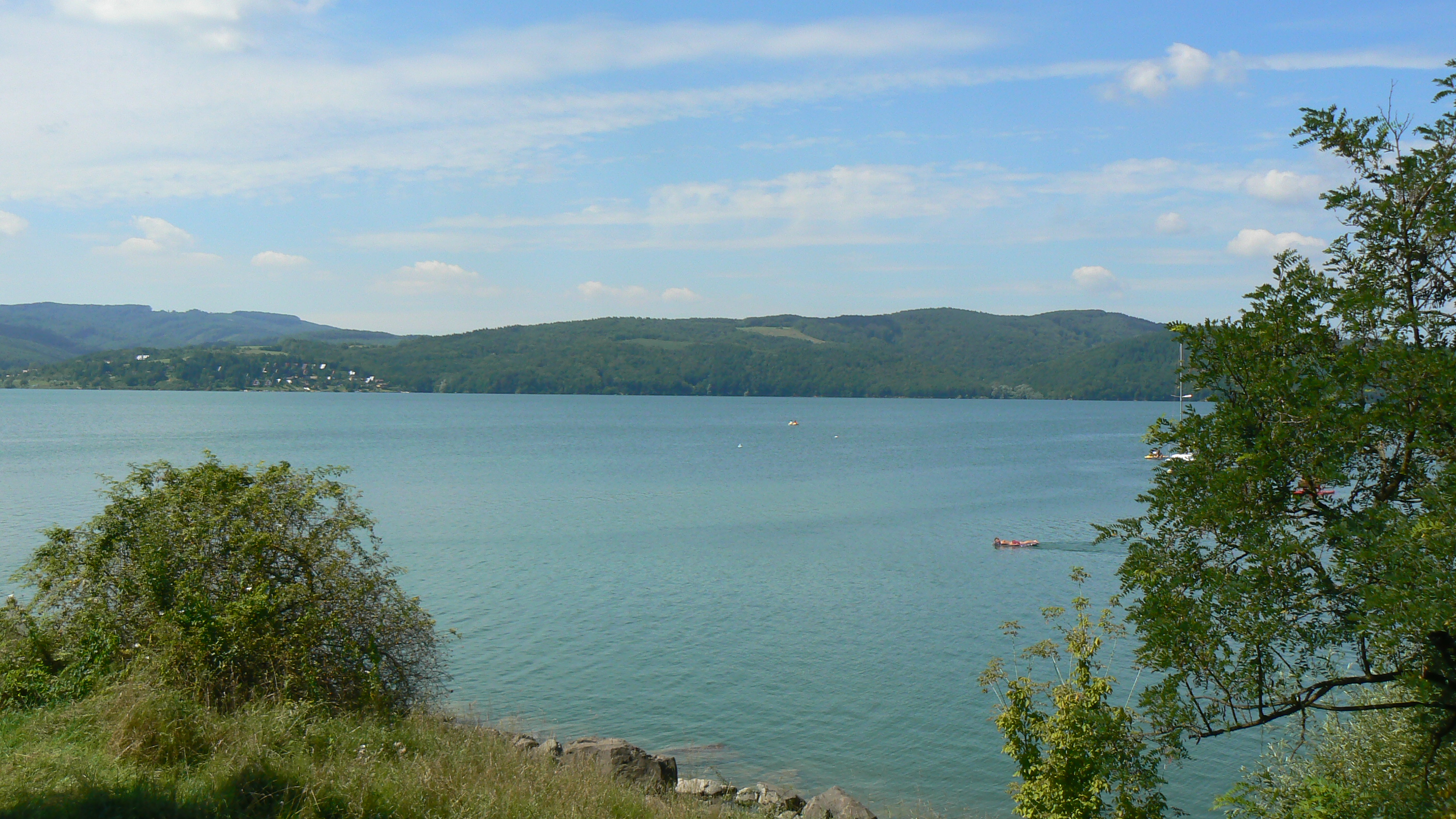

== See also ==
- Tourism in Slovakia
