= Valko =

Valko may refer to:

- Valkó (village), a village and commune in the Pest county, Hungary
- Valkó County, a county of the medieval Kingdom of Hungary
- Ernest Valko, murdered Slovak lawyer
- Taras Valko, Belarusian sprint canoer
- Valko (given name)
- Valko or Vlaksho, region of the 1st Bulgarian Empire.
- Valko, a cancelled character in the game Love and Deepspace
