= Nikolay Dobrev =

Bulgarian politician and engineer (1947-1999)

Personal details
- Born: 19 October 1947 Nevrokop, Bulgaria
- Died: 17 April 1999 (aged 51) Sofia, Bulgaria
- Children: Kiril Dobrev
- Profession: Politician, Engineer

Nikolay Kirilov Dobrev (Bulgarian: Николай Кирилов Добрев) (19 October 1947 – 17 April 1999) was a Bulgarian politician who served as Minister of the Interior of Bulgaria between 10 May 1996 and 12 February 1997.

== Biography ==
Dobrev studied geophysics in Sofia and then worked as an engineer at the Laboratory for underground nuclear geophysics and geochemistry (Bulgarian: Лаборатория по подземна и ядрена геофизика и геохимия).

In 1991, Dobrev was elected as a member of the National Parliament and became part of the supreme council (Bulgarian: Висшия съвет) of BSP.

After Lyubomir Nachev's resignation, Dobrev succeeded him as Minister of the Interior in the Zhan Videnov cabinet in 1996.

Dobrev played an important role during the December 1996-February 1997 political deadlock in Bulgaria. After discontent against the economic policies of the Zhan Videnov government and the resulting inflation triggered massive protests, strikes as well as acts of civil disobedience, Dobrev (who was envisioned by the BSP as the next Prime Minister following Videnov's resignation) and Georgi Parvanov reached an agreement on 4 February 1997 with then Bulgarian president Petar Stoyanov not to attempt to form a new government under the Socialists' mandate (even though they were legally entitled to do so). This paved the way for the early Parliamentary elections and ended the political crisis.

He died of cancer on 17 April 1999 in Sofia. In 2007, Dobrev was posthumously awarded with the "Justice, Freedom and Security" medal (Bulgarian: медал „Правосъдие, свобода, сигурност“) by the Ministry of the Interior. A special distinction for a young politician from the BSP is also under his name.
