= Valko (given name) =

Valko (Bulgarian: Вълко) is a Bulgarian masculine given name derived from the word вълк, 'wolf'. It produced the patronymic surname (and the patronymic) Valkov/Valkova. Notable people with the name include:

- Valko Chervenkov, Prime Minister of communist Bulgaria
- Valko Kostov, Bulgarian wrestler

== See also ==
- Valcho
