= Krasimir Premyanov =

Personal details
- Born: 27 January 1955 (age 71) Burgas, Bulgaria
- Profession: Politician, Lawyer

Krasimir Andreev Premyanov (Bulgarian: Красимир Андреев Премянов) (born 27 January 1955) is a Bulgarian politician who has been a member of two National Parliaments. Married with two children.

== Biography ==
Premyanov completed legal studies (focusing on international law) in Odesa and also earned a degree in political science in Moscow.

In 1990 he became a member of the supreme council (Bulgarian: Висшия съвет) of the Bulgarian Socialist Party (BSP) and rose to the position of deputy leader of the party in 1994. He remained in that capacity until 1998.

In 2006, Krasimir Premyanov was chosen as the "person of the year" by the Bulgarian diaspora in Ukraine.

He has been chairman of the "Open Forum" federation (Bulgarian: Федерация "Открит форум").

Currently he is Chairman of the Union of Thracian Partnerships (Bulgarian: Съюз на тракийските дружества).

In addition to his other endeavors, Premyanov is a practicing lawyer (member of the Sofia legal bar).
