= Kiril Dobrev =

Bulgarian politician (born 1972)

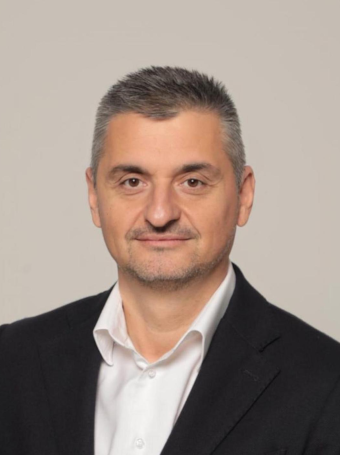
- Dobrev in 2024

Member of the National Assembly
- In office 11 November 2024 – 30 April 2026
- Constituency: Blagoevgrad
- In office 11 July 2005 – 26 May 2017
- Succeeded by: Kristina Sidorova
- Constituency: Sofia Province (2005–2014); Gabrovo (2014–2017)

Personal details
- Born: 18 April 1972 (age 54)
- Party: Bulgarian Socialist Party
- Parent: Nikolay Dobrev (father)

Kiril Nikolaev Dobrev (Bulgarian: Кирил Николаев Добрев; born 18 April 1972) is a Bulgarian politician. He has been a member of the National Assembly since 2024, having previously served from 2005 to 2017. He is the son of Nikolay Dobrev.
