= Valcho =

Valcho (Bulgarian: Вълчо) is a Bulgarian masculine given name derived from the word вълк, 'wolf'. It produced the patronymic surname (and the patronymic) Valchev/Valcheva. Notable people with the name include:

- Valcho Stoev (born 1952), Bulgarian shot putter
- Valcho Kostov or Valko Kostov, Bulgarian wrestler

== See also ==
- Valko (given name)
