= Valchev =

Valchev (Bulgarian: Вълчев), feminine: Valcheva is a Bulgarian patronymic surname derived from the given name Вълчо, Valcho, whoich is derived from Bulgarian for 'wolf'. Notable people with the surname include:

- Daniel Valchev, Bulgarian politician
- Emil Valtchev, Bulgarian volleyball player
- Enyu Valchev (1936–2014), Bulgarian sport wrestler
- Georgi Valchev, Bulgarian footballer
- Ivaylo Valchev (born 1972), Bulgarian politician
- Kiril Valchev, Bulgarian journalist and lawyer, the namesake of the Valchev Cove, Antarctica
- Krasimir Valchev, Bulgarian politician
- Mihail Valchev (born 1956), Bulgarian footballer and manager
- Yordan Valchev, Bulgarian rower
