= Klin nad Bodrogom =

Klin nad Bodrogom Bodrogszög
- Municipality
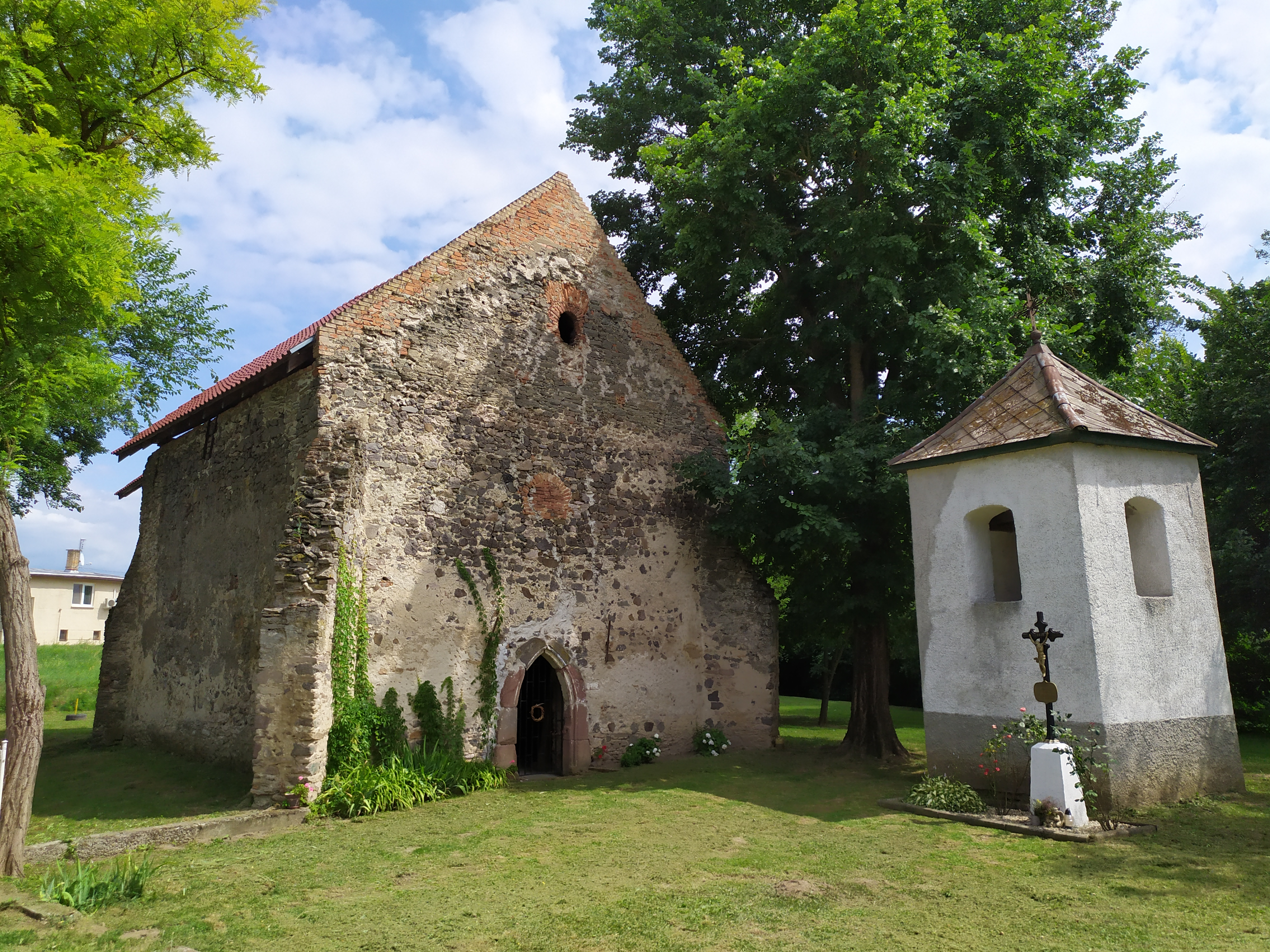
- Church of Saints Joachim and Anne

- Flag

- Location of Klin nad Bodrogom in the Košice Region Location of Klin nad Bodrogom in Slovakia
- Coordinates: 48.38°N 21.73°E
- Country: Slovakia
- Region: Košice Region
- District: Trebišov District
- First mentioned: 1378

Area
  - Total: 3.66 km^{2} (1.41 sq mi)
- Elevation: 97 m (318 ft)

Population (2025)
  - Total: 182
- Time zone: UTC+1 (CET)
  - Summer (DST): UTC+2 (CEST)
- Postal code: 763 1
- Area code: +421 56
- Vehicle registration plate (until 2022): TV
- Website: www.klinnadbodrogom.sk

Klin nad Bodrogom (Hungarian: Bodrogszög) is a village and municipality in the Trebišov District in the Košice Region of south-eastern Slovakia.

== History ==
In historical records the village was first mentioned in 1378.

== Geography ==
The municipality lies at an altitude of 97 metres (318 ft) and covers an area of 3.66 km^{2} (1.41 sq mi) (2025).

== Historical monuments ==
Interesting ruins of a small Gothic church from the 13th century lie at the end of the village (by the old parsonage and the municipal authority office), near the banks of the Bodrog River. It probably became abandoned and perished in the 17th century. There were some attempts to rebuild the church in the second half of the 19th century, but these weren't successful and didn't alter the original appearance of the structure too much.

== Population ==
Population statistic (10 years)
Year	1995	2005	2015	2025
Count	209	194	218	182
Difference		−7.17%	+12.37%	−16.51%

Population statistic
Year	2024	2025
Count	185	182
Difference		−1.62%

It has a population of 182 people (31 December 2025).

=== Ethnicity ===
Census 2021 (1+ %)
Ethnicity	Number	Fraction
Slovak	113	57.94%
Hungarian	96	49.23%
Not found out	16	8.2%
Czech	2	1.02%
Total	195	

In year 2021 was 195 people by ethnicity 113 as Slovak, 96 as Hungarian, 16 as Not found out and 2 as Czech.

Note on population: The difference values of population numbers in the table "Population statistic" and in the sections "Ethnicity" & "Religion" is caused by the use of various statistical methods.

=== Religion ===
Census 2021 (1+ %)
Religion	Number	Fraction
Roman Catholic Church	103	52.82%
Greek Catholic Church	25	12.82%
None	25	12.82%
Calvinist Church	24	12.31%
Not found out	16	8.21%
Evangelical Church	2	1.03%
Total	195	

In year 2021 was 195 people by religion 103 from Roman Catholic Church, 25 from Greek Catholic Church, 25 from None, 24 from Calvinist Church, 16 from Not found out and 2 from Evangelical Church.

== Facilities ==
The village has a soccer pitch.

== Genealogical resources ==
The records for genealogical research are available at the state archive "Statny Archiv in Kosice, Slovakia"

- Roman Catholic church records (births/marriages/deaths): 1743-1909 (parish B)
- Greek Catholic church records (births/marriages/deaths): 1787-1878 (parish B)
- Reformated church records (births/marriages/deaths): 1758-1924 (parish B)

== See also ==
- List of municipalities and towns in Slovakia
