= Mihail Mikov =

- Михаил Миков
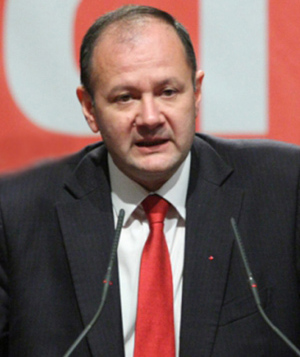
- Mikov in 2015

Leader of the Bulgarian Socialist Party
- In office 27 July 2014 – 8 May 2016
- Preceded by: Sergei Stanishev
- Succeeded by: Korneliya Ninova

Speaker of the National Assembly
- In office 21 May 2013 – 26 January 2016
- Preceded by: Tsetska Tsacheva
- Succeeded by: Tsetska Tsacheva

Minister of Interior
- In office 24 April 2008 – 27 July 2009
- Prime Minister: Sergei Stanishev
- Preceded by: Rumen Petkov
- Succeeded by: Tsvetan Tsvetanov

Member of the National Assembly
- In office 14 July 2009 – 26 January 2017
- Constituency: 5th MMC – Vidin (2009–2016); 25th MMC – Sofia (2016–2017)
- In office 7 May 1997 – 24 April 2008
- Constituency: 5th MMC – Vidin

Personal details
- Born: 16 June 1960 (age 65) Kula, Bulgaria
- Party: Communist Party (Before 1990); Socialist Party (1990–present)
- Website: Official website

Mihail Raykov Mikov (Bulgarian: Михаил Райков Миков; born 16 June 1960) is a Bulgarian politician who was Chairman of the Bulgarian Socialist Party (BSP) from 2014 to 2016. He is a parliamentarian with six consecutive terms as a deputy in the National Assembly. His career in the legislature culminated in his election as Chairman of the 42nd National Assembly on May 21, 2013. Mikov was Minister of Interior from 24 April 2008 to 29 July 2009 in Sergei Stanishev's government. Currently he is the leader of the Parliamentary Group of BSP Left Bulgaria in the 43rd National Assembly, the coalition led by the socialist party. Mihail Mikov was elected as Chairman of the BSP on 27 July 2014, succeeding Sergei Stanishev. He won a run-off against outgoing Economy and Energy Minister Dragomir Stoynev with a final tally of 377-333.

On May 8, 2016, Mikov was defeated 395-349 in a runoff vote by Korneliya Ninova for the leadership of the party.

== Early life and education ==
Mikov was born in the Bulgarian town of Kula, Vidin Province, on June 16, 1960. He graduated from the Faculty of Law of the Sofia University where he later taught criminal law. Mikov has postgraduate specializations in Human rights, NGO taxation, Anticorruption Practices. He is fluent in French, Russian and Serbian. Mikov is married with two children.

== Political career ==
=== Socialist ===
Mihail Mikov became a member of the Bulgarian Communist Party and after the democratic changes in Bulgaria in 1989 – a member of its successor, the Bulgarian Socialist Party. In the last parliamentary elections, held on October 5, 2014, BSP scored its lowest results since the restoration of the multiparty system. The new leadership under Mikov has stated the following goals:

- Consolidating BSP
- Modernizing the party
- Upholding the core values of socialism and social democracy
- Protecting the interests of the majority of Bulgarian citizens

=== Lawmaker ===
The leader of the Bulgarian socialists is acknowledged for his career as a jurist and a lawmaker. As an academic he consulted the authors of many bills and laws adopted by parliaments starting from the Grand National Assembly, including the present Bulgarian Constitution. He was elected for his first term in 1997 and became deputy from Vidin. In parliament he initiated constitutional and criminal law changes including such restricting the immunity of lawmakers, judges and prosecutors, creating the institution of Ombudsman and improving the accountability of the higher judicial bodies before the national legislature. Other reforms he co-authored lead to the abolition of the death penalty and criminalization of computer crimes.

=== Minister of Interior ===
Mihail Mikov was appointed Minister of interior in the BSP lead government of Sergei Stanishev and occupied that post from April 2008 to July 2009. In that executive role he undertook several reforms including the creation of a special department to fight organized crime. Mikov revealed the staff of the Ministry of Internal Affairs for the first time since the start of the democratic changes in Bulgaria – a move that many NGOs insisted on and which is a normal practice across the EU. Among his priorities were:

- Restructuring GDBOP, the directorate responsible for the battle against organized crime.
- Creation of General Directorate "Pre-trial Proceedings".
- Reduction the staff of several other directorates – "Security Police", "Criminal Police", "Border Police", "Fire Department".

=== Chairman of National Assembly ===
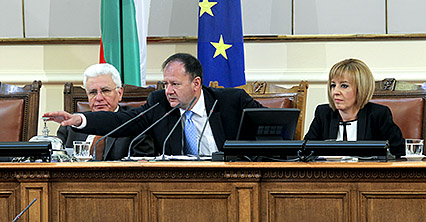
Mihail Mikov as Chairman of the 42nd National Assembly - 2013.

Mikov was elected Chairman of the 42nd National Assembly on May 21, 2013 and occupied that post until August 5, 2014.

==== Initiatives ====
- Mihail Mikov became a cofounder of the Parliamentary Assembly of the South-East European Cooperation Process and worked for increased cooperation in the region through participation in the Danube Initiative, Black Sea Economic Initiative and other important processes.
- The Chairman of the National Assembly presided over festivities for the 135th anniversary of the Constituent Assembly and the adoption of the Tarnovo Constitution.
- Mikov patroned the events marking the 125th anniversary of the death of Antim I, Chairman of the Constituent Assembly and the Ist Grand National Assembly of Bulgaria.

==== Positions and controversies ====
During the 2013–14 Bulgarian protests against the Oresharski cabinet, provoked by the nomination of Delyan Peevski for chairman of the State Agency for National Security, Mihail Mikov made a special address to the nation on June 26, 2013 in which he criticized mass media for increasing tension by their covering of the antigovernment protests. Mikov's remarks provoked a strong reaction from the press and the electronic media. Many of them signed a declaration in which they rejected any political and institutional attempts to influence freedom of speech and their editorial independence.

In October 2013 students from the Sofia University met Mikov in his cabinet after protesting inside the parliament's building. Later they quoted him as saying that he "doesn't care for those protesting" against the government. The chairmen of the National Assembly told them that he had been elected by voters for several terms and that in parliament deputies represent the sovereign as a whole and not a certain number of people.

In an interview around the premature end of his term as head of Bulgarian Parliament Mihail Mikov stated that he does not consider the mandate of the government and the ruling majority to be a failure. "That was a parliament of the necessary social decisions, of increased parliamentary control over the government… a parliament of the possible majority, born by the elections in May 2013”, he said quoted by the daily "Pressa".

=== Chairman of BSP ===
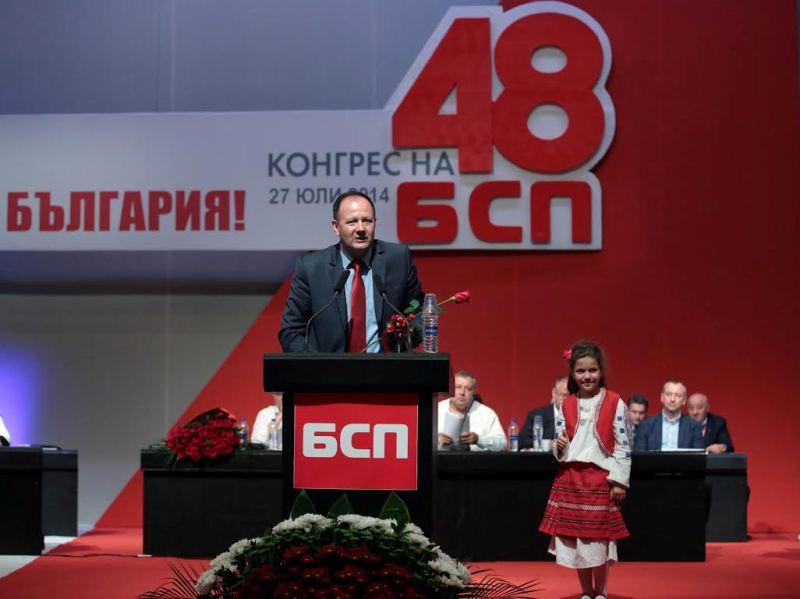
Mihail Mikov, elected Chairman of BSP - July 27, 2014.

Mihail Mikov was elected Chairman of BSP on July 27, 2014, succeeding Sergei Stanishev who lead the socialists for 13 years. He won a run-off against outgoing Economy and Energy Minister Dragomir Stoynev with a final tally of 377-333. There were 16 invalid ballots and 36 delegates decided not to vote.

=== Elections 2014 ===
The snap parliamentary elections on October 5, 2014 left the Bulgarian Socialist Party, and its coalition – BSP Left Bulgaria, with its weakest results since the start of the democratic changes in Bulgaria. BSP won 15,4% in a vote marked by low voters' turnout – just above 48%. At a pressconference after polls were closed Mihail Mikov admitted election defeat and pointed out that the party that won the most votes – the center-right GERB, now had the responsibility to form government.

On several rounds of consultations on the new government BSP highlighted its differences with GERB and announced it was to remain in opposition to the right lead majority in the new parliament and the future Ministerial Council. Although different opinions were heard, including those of some leading representatives of the Socialist Party, Mikov and the majority of the party's governing bodies maintained that opposing the center-right government was the right move.

=== 43rd National Assembly ===
On October 5, 2014 Mihail Mikov was elected to the 43rd National Assembly from two election districts – in Sofia, and in Vidin, where he traditionally runs for office. The leader of the Socialist party chose to become deputy from the capital. On October 27, 2014 he was elected leader of the Parliamentary Group of BSP Left Bulgaria.

Political offices
| Preceded by Rumen Petkov | Minister of Interior; 2008–2009 | Succeeded by Tsvetan Tsvetanov |
| Preceded by Tsetska Tsacheva | Chair of the National Assembly; 2013–2014 | Succeeded by Tsetska Tsacheva |
Party political offices
| Preceded by Sergei Stanishev | Leader of the Socialist Party; 2014–2016 | Succeeded by Korneliya Ninova |
