= Leaderism =

Political term

The Russian political term leaderism (Russian: вождизм, vozhdism) means "a policy directed at the affirmation/confirmation of one person in the role of an indisputable or infallible leader". Manifestations of vozhdism include clientelism, nepotism, tribalism, and messianism.

Forms of leaderism include Italian fascism, Führerprinzip, Stalinism, Maoism, and Juche. According to Nikolai Berdyaev (1874–1948), Leninism represented a new type of leaderism, featuring a leader of masses having dictatorship powers, while Joseph Stalin as vozhd exemplifies an ultimate type of such a supreme leader.

In Marxist–Leninist phraseology, leaderism is a pejorative, in opposition to the officially proclaimed "principle of collective leadership". As representative types of leaderist societies, some modern Russian authors argue include the regimes of Islamic leaders, and Vladimir Putin.

== See also ==
- Autocracy
- Caesarism
- Caudillo
- Cult of personality
- Dictatorship
- Strongman
