= Valkov =

Valkov (Bulgarian: Вълков, Russian: Вальков), feminine: Valkova, is a Bulgarian and Russian patronymic surname of different origins. Notable people with the surname include:

- Aleksandr Valkov (born 1986), Russian football player
- Diyan Valkov (born 1993), Bulgarian football player
- Gabriel Vulkov (born 1996), Bulgarian politician
- Konstantin Valkov (born 1971), Russian cosmonaut
- Stanimir Dimov-Valkov (born 1978), Bulgarian football player
- Vasily Valkov (1904–1972), Soviet ambassador
- Egor Valkov (born 1996), Norvegian kickboxer
