= Gabriel Valkov =

Bulgarian politician (born 1996)

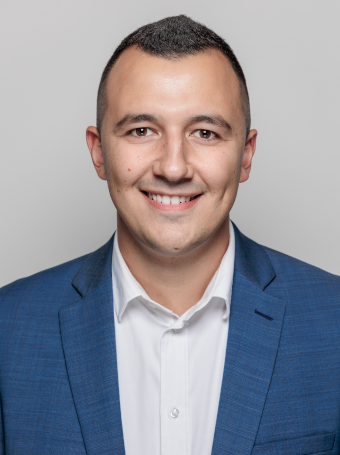
- Valkov in 2024

Member of the National Assembly
- Incumbent
- Assumed office 11 November 2024
- Constituency: 23rd MMC

Personal details
- Born: 15 December 1996 (age 29)
- Party: Bulgarian Socialist Party (since 2015)

Gabriel Georgiev Valkov (Bulgarian: Габриел Георгиев Вълков; born 15 December 1996) is a Bulgarian politician serving as a member of the National Assembly since 2024. He has been a member of the Bulgarian Socialist Party since 2015, and has served as leader of its youth wing since 2022.
