= Stročín =

- Municipality
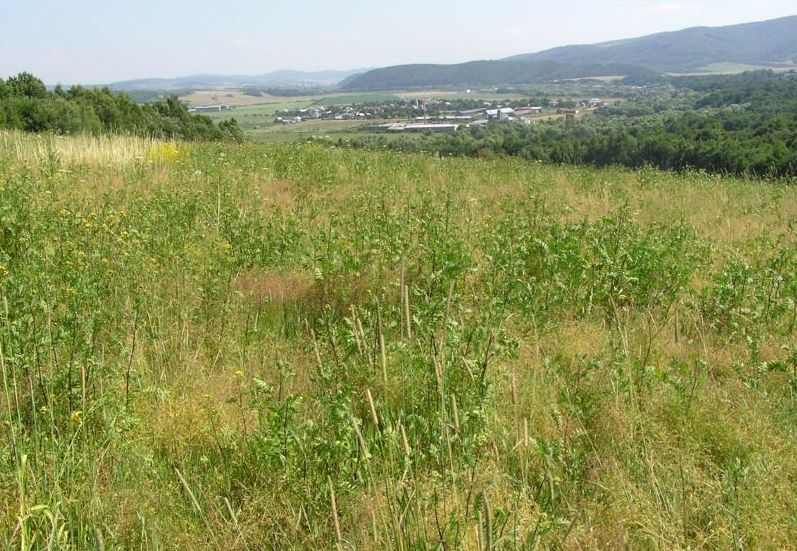

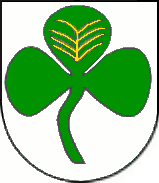
- Flag Coat of arms

- Location of Stročín in the Prešov Region Location of Stročín in Slovakia
- Coordinates: 49.27°N 21.60°E
- Country: Slovakia
- Region: Prešov Region
- District: Svidník District
- First mentioned: 1317

Area
  - Total: 8.65 km^{2} (3.34 sq mi)
- Elevation: 210 m (690 ft)

Population (2025)
  - Total: 568
- Time zone: UTC+1 (CET)
  - Summer (DST): UTC+2 (CEST)
- Postal code: 904 1
- Area code: +421 54
- Vehicle registration plate (until 2022): SK
- Website: www.obecstrocin.sk

Stročín (Hungarian: Szorocsány, until 1899: Sztrocsin) is a village and municipality in Svidník District in the Prešov Region of north-eastern Slovakia.

== History ==
In historical records the village was first mentioned in 1317.

== Geography ==
The municipality lies at an altitude of 210 metres (690 ft) and covers an area of 8.65 km^{2} (3.34 sq mi) (2025).

== Population ==
Population statistic (10 years)
Year	1995	2005	2015	2025
Count	394	499	564	568
Difference		+26.64%	+13.02%	+0.70%

Population statistic
Year	2024	2025
Count	572	568
Difference		−0.69%

It has a population of 568 people (31 December 2025).

=== Ethnicity ===
Census 2021 (1+ %)
Ethnicity	Number	Fraction
Slovak	495	88.23%
Romani	125	22.28%
Rusyn	52	9.26%
Not found out	20	3.56%
Total	561	

In year 2021 was 561 people by ethnicity 495 as Slovak, 125 as Romani, 52 as Rusyn, 20 as Not found out, 4 as Czech, 4 as Russian and 1 as Other.

Note on population: The difference values of population numbers in the table "Population statistic" and in the sections "Ethnicity" & "Religion" is caused by the use of various statistical methods.

=== Religion ===
Census 2021 (1+ %)
Religion	Number	Fraction
Greek Catholic Church	374	66.67%
Roman Catholic Church	125	22.28%
None	29	5.17%
Eastern Orthodox Church	17	3.03%
Not found out	14	2.5%
Total	561	

In year 2021 was 561 people by religion 374 from Greek Catholic Church, 125 from Roman Catholic Church, 29 from None, 17 from Eastern Orthodox Church, 14 from Not found out, 1 from Evangelical Church and 1 from Buddhism.
