= Kuková =

- Municipality
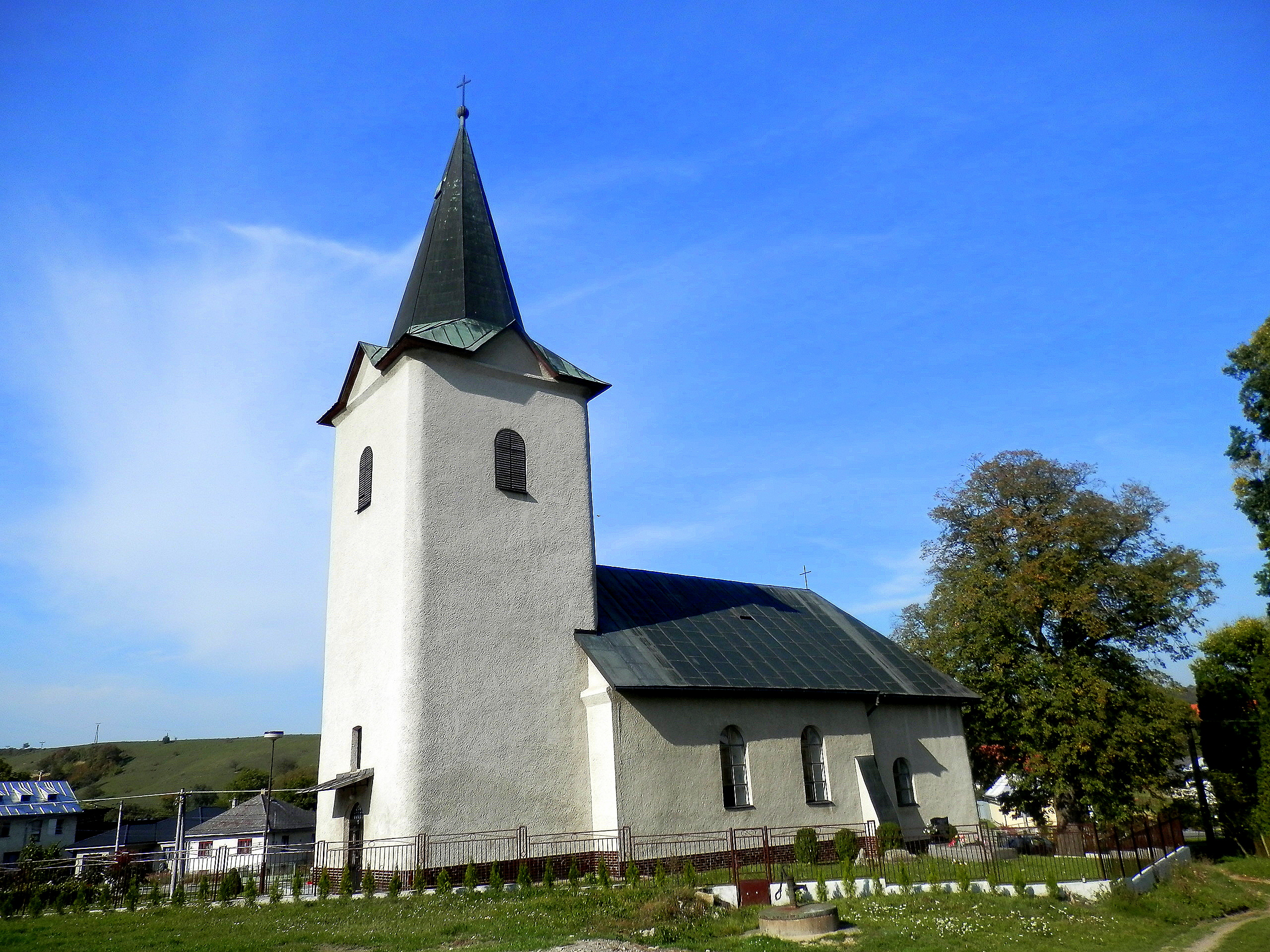

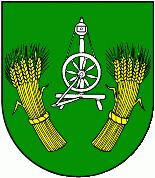
- Flag Coat of arms

- Location of Kuková in the Prešov Region Location of Kuková in Slovakia
- Coordinates: 49.11°N 21.45°E
- Country: Slovakia
- Region: Prešov Region
- District: Svidník District
- First mentioned: 1342

Area
  - Total: 10.60 km^{2} (4.09 sq mi)
- Elevation: 203 m (666 ft)

Population (2025)
  - Total: 760
- Time zone: UTC+1 (CET)
  - Summer (DST): UTC+2 (CEST)
- Postal code: 864 4
- Area code: +421 54
- Vehicle registration plate (until 2022): SK
- Website: www.obeckukova.sk

Kuková (Hungarian: Kükemező) is a village and municipality in Svidník District in the Prešov Region of north-eastern Slovakia.

== History ==
In historical records, the village was first mentioned in 1342.

== Geography ==
The municipality lies at an altitude of 203 metres (666 ft) and covers an area of 10.60 km^{2} (4.09 sq mi) (2025).

== Population ==
Population statistic (10 years)
Year	1995	2005	2015	2025
Count	691	706	728	760
Difference		+2.17%	+3.11%	+4.39%

Population statistic
Year	2024	2025
Count	737	760
Difference		+3.12%

It has a population of 760 people (31 December 2025).

=== Ethnicity ===
Census 2021 (1+ %)
Ethnicity	Number	Fraction
Slovak	689	95.69%
Not found out	28	3.88%
Romani	19	2.63%
Total	720	

In year 2021 was 720 people by ethnicity 689 as Slovak, 28 as Not found out, 19 as Romani, 3 as Rusyn, 3 as German, 1 as Czech, 1 as Ukrainian, 1 as Polish and 1 as Other.

Note on population: The difference values of population numbers in the table "Population statistic" and in the sections "Ethnicity" & "Religion" is caused by the use of various statistical methods.

=== Religion ===
Census 2021 (1+ %)
Religion	Number	Fraction
Roman Catholic Church	417	57.92%
Evangelical Church	192	26.67%
Greek Catholic Church	48	6.67%
Not found out	26	3.61%
None	23	3.19%
Total	720	

In year 2021 was 720 people by religion 417 from Roman Catholic Church, 192 from Evangelical Church, 48 from Greek Catholic Church, 26 from Not found out, 23 from None, 7 from Eastern Orthodox Church, 3 from Ad hoc movements, 1 from Paganism and natural spirituality, 1 from Other and not ascertained christian church, 1 from Jehovah's Witnesses and 1 from Church of the Brethren.
