= Nová Kelča =

- Municipality
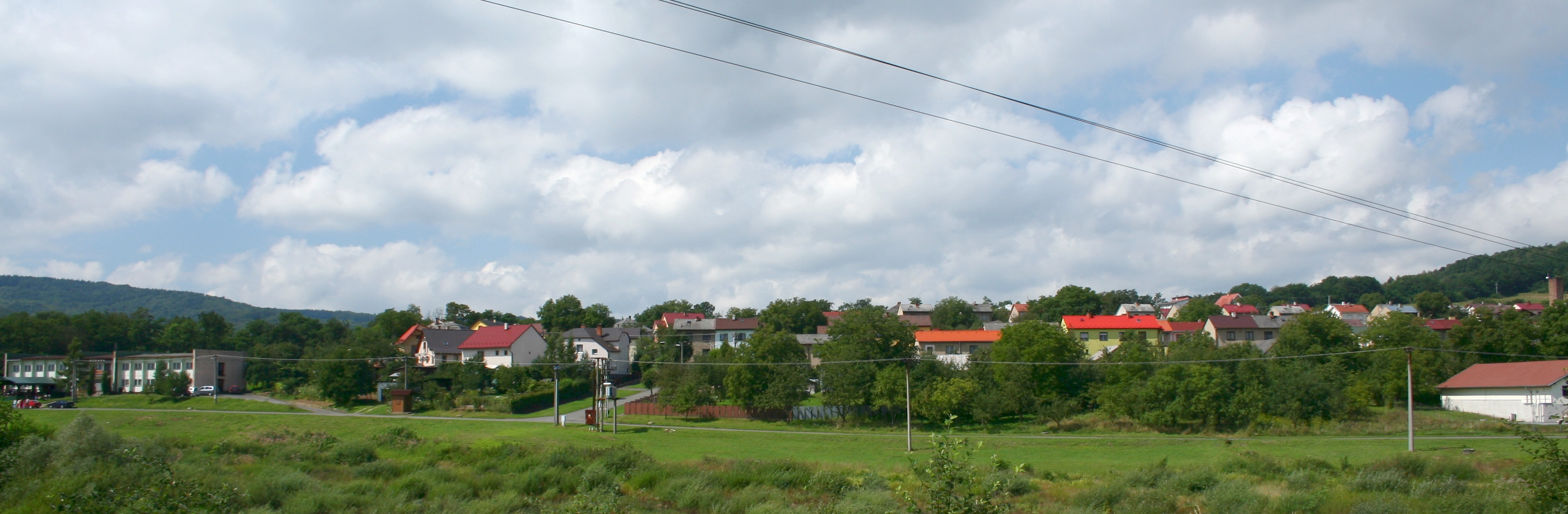

- Flag

- Location of Nová Kelča in the Prešov Region Location of Nová Kelča in Slovakia
- Coordinates: 49.06°N 21.69°E
- Country: Slovakia
- Region: Prešov Region
- District: Vranov nad Topľou District
- First mentioned: 1404

Area
  - Total: 11.83 km^{2} (4.57 sq mi)
- Elevation: 181 m (594 ft)

Population (2025)
  - Total: 364
- Time zone: UTC+1 (CET)
  - Summer (DST): UTC+2 (CEST)
- Postal code: 940 4
- Area code: +421 57
- Vehicle registration plate (until 2022): VT
- Website: novakelca.sk

Nová Kelča (Hungarian: Kelcse) is a village and municipality in Vranov nad Topľou District in the Prešov Region of eastern Slovakia.

== History ==
In historical records the village was first mentioned in 1404.

== Geography ==
The municipality lies at an altitude of 181 metres (594 ft) and covers an area of 11.83 km^{2} (4.57 sq mi) (2025).

== Population ==
Population statistic (10 years)
Year	1995	2005	2015	2025
Count	382	351	383	364
Difference		−8.11%	+9.11%	−4.96%

Population statistic
Year	2024	2025
Count	356	364
Difference		+2.24%

It has a population of 364 people (31 December 2025).

=== Ethnicity ===
Census 2021 (1+ %)
Ethnicity	Number	Fraction
Slovak	324	98.18%
Rusyn	13	3.93%
Not found out	9	2.72%
Total	330	

In year 2021 was 330 people by ethnicity 324 as Slovak, 13 as Rusyn, 9 as Not found out, 2 as Polish, 1 as Czech, 1 as Ukrainian and 1 as Other.

Note on population: The difference values of population numbers in the table "Population statistic" and in the sections "Ethnicity" & "Religion" is caused by the use of various statistical methods.

=== Religion ===
Census 2021 (1+ %)
Religion	Number	Fraction
Roman Catholic Church	297	90%
Greek Catholic Church	20	6.06%
None	7	2.12%
Not found out	4	1.21%
Total	330	

In year 2021 was 330 people by religion 297 from Roman Catholic Church, 20 from Greek Catholic Church, 7 from None, 4 from Not found out and 2 from Eastern Orthodox Church.
