= Malá Domaša =

- Municipality
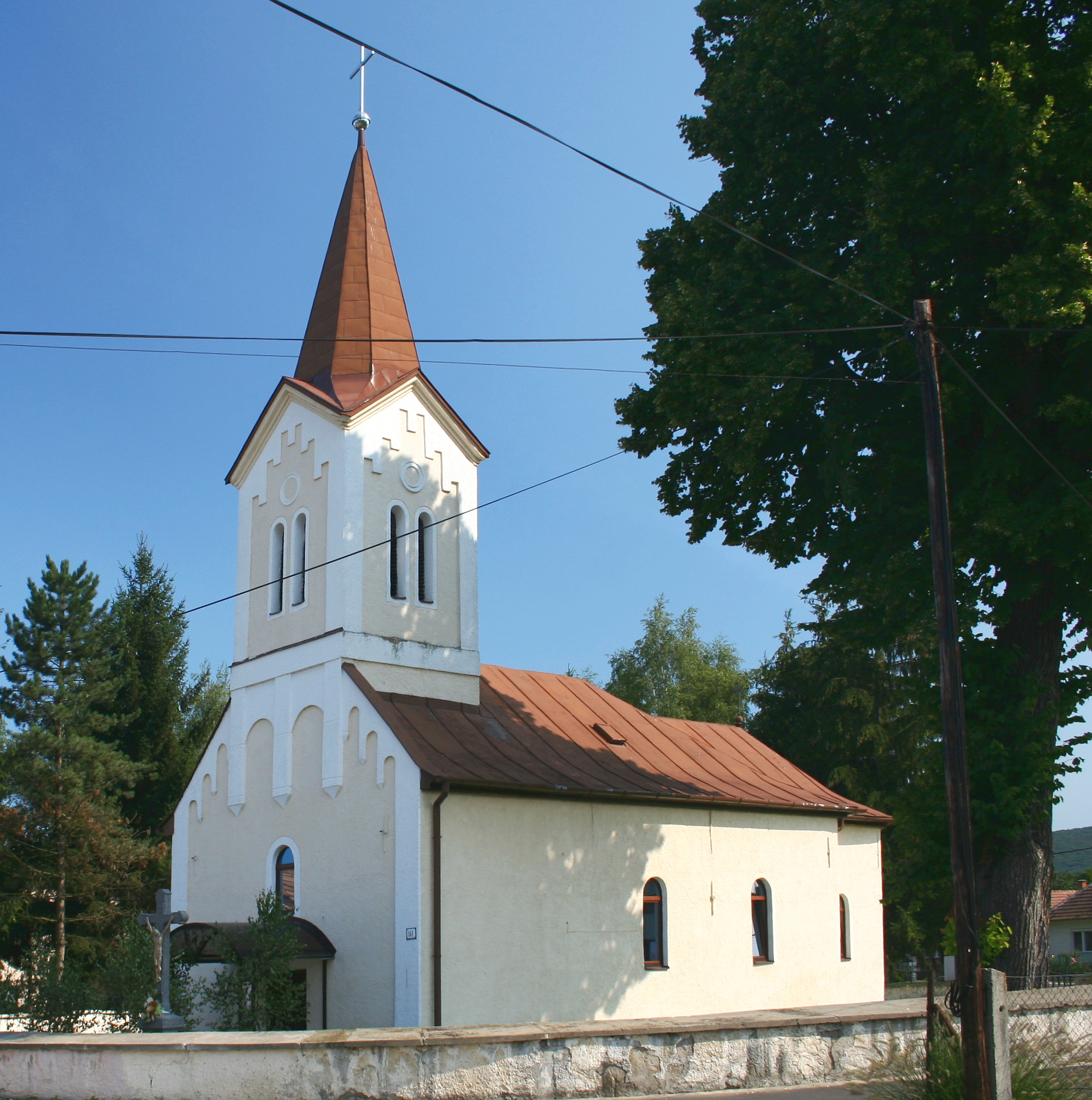

- Flag Coat of arms

- Location of Malá Domaša in the Prešov Region Location of Malá Domaša in Slovakia
- Coordinates: 48.97°N 21.72°E
- Country: Slovakia
- Region: Prešov Region
- District: Vranov nad Topľou District
- First mentioned: 1317

Area
  - Total: 5.67 km^{2} (2.19 sq mi)
- Elevation: 137 m (449 ft)

Population (2025)
  - Total: 718
- Time zone: UTC+1 (CET)
  - Summer (DST): UTC+2 (CEST)
- Postal code: 940 2
- Area code: +421 57
- Vehicle registration plate (until 2022): VT
- Website: www.maladomasa.sk

Malá Domaša (Hungarian: Kisdomása) is a village and municipality in Vranov nad Topľou District in the Prešov Region of eastern Slovakia.

== History ==
In historical records the village was first mentioned in 1317.

== Geography ==
The municipality lies at an altitude of 137 metres (449 ft) and covers an area of 5.67 km^{2} (2.19 sq mi) (2025).

== Population ==
Population statistic (10 years)
Year	1995	2005	2015	2025
Count	402	434	526	718
Difference		+7.96%	+21.19%	+36.50%

Population statistic
Year	2024	2025
Count	706	718
Difference		+1.69%

It has a population of 718 people (31 December 2025).

=== Ethnicity ===
Census 2021 (1+ %)
Ethnicity	Number	Fraction
Slovak	621	97.18%
Romani	20	3.12%
Not found out	11	1.72%
Rusyn	8	1.25%
Total	639	

In year 2021 was 639 people by ethnicity 621 as Slovak, 20 as Romani, 11 as Not found out, 8 as Rusyn, 3 as Other, 1 as Czech, 1 as Ukrainian and 1 as Polish.

Note on population: The difference values of population numbers in the table "Population statistic" and in the sections "Ethnicity" & "Religion" is caused by the use of various statistical methods.

=== Religion ===
Census 2021 (1+ %)
Religion	Number	Fraction
Roman Catholic Church	524	82%
None	47	7.36%
Greek Catholic Church	46	7.2%
Evangelical Church	7	1.1%
Total	639	

In year 2021 was 639 people by religion 524 from Roman Catholic Church, 47 from None, 46 from Greek Catholic Church, 7 from Evangelical Church, 6 from Not found out, 5 from Jehovah's Witnesses, 1 from Calvinist Church, 1 from Eastern Orthodox Church, 1 from Paganism and natural spirituality and 1 from Czechoslovak Hussite Church.
