= Dragomir Stoynev =

Bulgarian politician (born 1970)

- Драгомир Стойнев
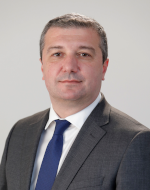
- Official portrait, 2021

Minister of Economy, Energy and Tourism
- In office 29 May 2013 – 6 August 2014
- Prime Minister: Plamen Oresharski
- Preceded by: Assen Vassilev
- Succeeded by: Vasil Shtonov

Member of the National Assembly
- Incumbent
- Assumed office 27 October 2014
- Constituency: 13th MMC - Pazardzhik
- In office 14 July 2009 – 29 May 2013
- Constituency: 26th MMC – Sofia

Personal details
- Born: 6 May 1976 (age 50) Tripoli, Libya
- Party: Bulgarian Socialist Party
- Education: Paris 1 Panthéon-Sorbonne University
- Occupation: economist; politician

Dragomir Velkov Stoynev is a Bulgarian politician and economist who is currently a Member of the National Assembly. He previously served as the Minister of Economy, Energy and Tourism.
