= Bulgarian Socialist Party =

Centre-left Bulgarian political party

Bulgarian Socialist Party Българска социалистическа партия
- Abbreviation: BSP
- Chairperson: Krum Zarkov
- Parliamentary leader: Nataliya Kiselova
- Founded: 3 April 1990
- Preceded by: Bulgarian Communist Party
- Headquarters: 20 Positano Street, Sofia
- Newspaper: Duma
- Youth wing: Bulgarian Socialist Youth
- Membership (2020): ▼80,236
- Ideology: Social democracy; Democratic socialism; Social conservatism; Left-wing populism
- Political position: Centre-left
- National affiliation: BSP – United Left
- European affiliation: Party of European Socialists
- European Parliament group: Progressive Alliance of Socialists and Democrats
- International affiliation: Progressive Alliance; Socialist International
- Colors: Red
- Slogan: Разумните решения Razumnite resheniya ('The reasonable solutions')
- National Assembly: 0 / 240
- European Parliament: 2 / 17
- Municipalities: 72 / 265

Party flag

Website
- bsp.bg

The Bulgarian Socialist Party (BSP), (Note: Bulgarian: Българска социалистическа партия, romanized: Bǎlgarska socialističeska partija (BSP)) also known as The Centenarian, (Note: Bulgarian: Столетницата, romanized: Stoletnicata) is a centre-left, social democratic political party in Bulgaria. The BSP is a member of the Socialist International, Party of European Socialists, and Progressive Alliance. Although founded in 1990 in its modern form, it traces its political heritage back to the founding of the BRSDP in 1891. It is also Bulgaria's largest party by membership numbers.

== History ==
The Centenarian moniker comes from the fact that the BSP is recognized as the successor of the Bulgarian Social Democratic Party, which was founded on 2 August 1891 on Buzludzha peak by Dimitar Blagoev, designated in 1903 as the Bulgarian Social Democratic Workers' Party (Narrow Socialists), and later as the Bulgarian Communist Party. After the political changes brought by the Revolutions of 1989, it abandoned Marxism–Leninism and refounded itself as the BSP in April 1990.

The party formed a government after the 1990 Bulgarian Constitutional Assembly election but was forced to resign after a general strike that December. A non-partisan government led by Dimitar Iliev Popov took over until the 1991 Bulgarian parliamentary election later in October. In the aftermath, the party was confined to opposition. As part of the Democratic Left coalition, a forerunner of the BSP for Bulgaria, it helped form a new government in 1995, headed by BSP leader Zhan Videnov as the prime minister of Bulgaria. Large-scale demonstrations in the cities and a general strike prevented the formation of a new socialist government after its term ended at the end of 1996. The country had entered into a spiral of hyperinflation, the most serious economic and financial crisis in its recent history, after the shock therapy and privatization policies, also followed to various degrees by other post-Communist countries.

In the 2001 Bulgarian presidential election, party chairman Georgi Parvanov was elected the president of Bulgaria on the second round, defeating on the second ballot incumbent candidate Petar Stoyanov from the Union of Democratic Forces (SDS). Parvanov resigned as party chairman and was succeeded by Sergey Stanishev. It was a break of the two-party system between the BSP and the SDS.

After two full terms out of power (1997–2001), the BSP-led Coalition for Bulgaria won the 2005 Bulgarian parliamentary election with 31.0% of the vote but without a governing majority, and formed the Stanishev Government, headed by the prime minister and BSP chairman Stanishev, with the centrist and social-liberal parties National Movement Simeon II and the Movement for Rights and Freedoms (DPS), respectively. In the 2006 Bulgarian presidential election, Parvanov was re-elected in a landslide, becoming the first Bulgarian president to do so in direct elections. In 2007, Bulgaria joined the European Union. The governing BSP-led coalition lost millions of euros of financial aid in the wake of allegations of widespread political corruption. The cabinet was also unable to react to the 2008 financial crisis and its term ended with a budget deficit after several successive surplus years.

In the 2009 Bulgarian parliamentary election, the BSP was defeated by the new conservative party GERB, obtaining 37 out of 240 parliamentary seats (18%), and went into opposition. GERB assumed power through an anti-communist and anti-Turkish platform, calling the previous BSP-led government communist even though, as written in Jacobin by sociologist Jana Tsoneva, that government "had introduced some of the most radical neoliberal policies." In the 2013 Bulgarian parliamentary election, the party took 30.6% of the votes, second is GERB with 26.5%. Plamen Oresharski, the party's candidate for prime minister, and the Oresharski Government were elected with the parliament support of the BSP and the DPS. The appointment of the controversial media mogul Delyan Peevski as head of the state security agency DANS sparked large-scale protests on 14 June. Protests against the Oresharski cabinet continued until the government resigned. In the 2017 Bulgarian parliamentary election, the BSP made big gains but not enough to govern, as GERB made smaller gains as well, and the party remained in opposition to the Third Borisov Government, which included the far right United Patriots.

The BSP supported the 2020–2021 Bulgarian protests and led the left-wing opposition for a failed non-confidence vote. The protests ended when the prime minister Boyko Borisov resigned, but results after the April 2021 Bulgarian parliamentary election proved to be fragmented. After failed attempts from the BSP to form a government in the aftermath of an inconclusive July 2021 Bulgarian parliamentary election, the political crisis continued, as no government without the participation of Borissov could be formed, despite an anti-GERB majority. In addition, Korneliya Ninova, the party leader since 2016, has faced internal struggle, as the party has not been in government since 2016; the BSP has hesitated, depending on public opinion, between backing and rejecting There Is Such a People, the populist party created ahead of the anti-government protests and with the most seats. A third snap election for November 2021, this time also at the presidential level (2021 Bulgarian general election), ensued to solve the crisis. Following the election, Ninova decided to step down again although she will remain the chairman of BSP until the next party congress which will be held in January.

BSP agreed to be a part of the Petkov Government, together with PP, ITN and DB, receiving the ministries of social care, healthcare, agriculture and economy, with Chairwoman Korneliya Ninova also receiving the position of Deputy Prime Minister.

During the January Congress, Ninova's resignation was rejected, meaning that Ninova continued on as Chairwoman of the BSP, until the end of her mandate in 2024.

In the 2026 Bulgarian parliamentary election the BSP lost all of its seats. Before that, in February, it elected Krum Zarkov as its new Chairperson on a platform calling for a return to the party's socialist roots. After his election he published a manifesto entitled “The Socialism of Our Century” and toured the country, seeking to win the membership of the BSP over to his vision of a renewed and decidedly more socialist BSP.

== Ideology ==
Founded as the legal successor to the Bulgarian Communist Party, the BSP describes itself as a democratic socialist party, espousing socialist policies and values, while supporting a social market economy. It has also been described as a populist and social-democratic party. The party's policies have oscillated during its existence from a customary understanding of socialism during the Videnov era, to a more social-liberal worldview under Stanishev, to a socially conservative strain of socialism under Ninova. The party also got described as national communist.

Like most Party of European Socialists (PES) member parties, the BSP has a pro-European stance, although it has taken some Eurosceptic positions and called for an end to sanctions against Russia. Some news outlets, such as Novinite, The Wall Street Journal, and The Washington Post, have described its orientation as soft Russophilia.

In recent times under the leadership of Korneliya Ninova and unlike the majority of PES parties, the BSP has been described as more conservative on social issues, and like European Union politics it is more divided, with some leaders, such as Ninova, opposing same-sex marriage in Bulgaria. (Note: Other party leaders, such as Georgi Kadiev, the mayor of Sofia party candidate in 2009 and 2011, took part to the 2011 LGBT pride.) Many party leaders opposed the Istanbul Convention because they were against educating children about sexuality if it also meant same-sex relationships, and after a long debate decided to vote against it, despite internal division about it. Former BSP leader and then-PES head Sergey Stanishev strongly supported the Istanbul Convention. (Note: Like most countries in Central and Eastern Europe, post-Communist Bulgaria holds socially conservative attitudes when it comes to such matters as homosexuality; however, through the lead of the BSP's predecessor party, it was one of the first European countries to legalize homosexuality in 1968. As of 2020, right-wing and far-right organizations remain the most anti-LGBT groups, and anti-LGBT rhetoric and discrimination increased during the 2020–2021 Bulgarian protests, of which the BSP took part alongside other anti-government forces, against the incumbent right-wing government. The strong opposition among most Bulgarian political forces to the Istanbul Convention was also an issue of mistranslation.) Under Ninova's leadership, BSP additionally shifted to a more nationalist position.

== Membership ==
The party is the largest in Bulgaria by number of members, having 105,000 members as of 2016, down from 130,000 in 2013, 150,000 in 2012, 210,000 in 2009, 250,000 in 1996, and around 1 million members during the late period of the People's Republic of Bulgaria. In 2020, it had 80,236 members.

== List of chairmen ==
No.	Name (birth–death)	Portrait	Term of office	
1	Aleksandar Lilov (1933–2013)		3 April 1990	12 December 1991
2	Zhan Videnov (born 1959)		12 December 1991	21 December 1996
3	Georgi Parvanov (born 1957)		21 December 1996	5 December 2001
4	Sergey Stanishev (born 1966)		5 December 2001	27 July 2014
5	Mihail Mikov (born 1960)		27 July 2014	8 May 2016
6	Korneliya Ninova (born 1969)		8 May 2016	15 June 2024
7	Atanas Zafirov (born 1971)		15 June 2024	7 February 2026
8	Krum Zarkov (born 1982)		7 February 2026	

=== Videnov era ===
During the chairmanship of Zhan Videnov, the party followed the customary line for socialist parties – it rejected the large-scale privatization efforts of the SDS and instead moved toward a "mass" or "social" privatization campaign, which was intended to allow working and middle-class individuals ("the masses") to obtain stocks in various enterprises earmarked for privatization, as opposed to those shares only being sold to private investors on the stock market. The party under Videnov opposed what was perceived as the strong political and economic over-reliance on the United States, and instead sought to foster more friendly relations with the neighbouring PASOK-ruled Greece and SPS-ruled FR Yugoslavia.

=== Parvanov era ===
Parvanov, who had also been on the Bulgarian-Greek Parliamentary Friendship Committee, and was later elected as president of Bulgaria, chose to keep a degree of public distancing between party and state institutions and instead resigned his membership in the party following his elections. Though the Bulgarian constitution requires the President to resign any leadership positions within political parties, it does not require the officeholder to give up his party membership completely. He instead hand-picked Sergey Stanishev as his successor for the position. During his chairmanship, however, he opposed the NATO bombing of Yugoslavia. He stated that this was not a position against NATO, but only against its military operation. He stated that he would support Bulgaria's entry into NATO, but insisted that such an accession should only happen after negotiations with Russia. Though he was considered a member of the party's liberal wing, Parvanov also reached out to its more left-wing members and restored the party membership of Todor Zhivkov, who ruled the country for over 30 years during the socialist period and who was still very popular among socialists.

After having successfully completed two presidential terms, he re-joined the socialist party and initially put himself forward for another mandate as chairman, but withdrew it before the party's congress in 2012. Two years later, he was expelled from the party for "damaging its prestige", which he condemned as an authoritarian decision by the party's authorities. He then became the first former chairman to found his own separate party – the Alternative for Bulgarian Revival.

=== Stanishev era ===
Sergey Stanishev was noted in his policy shift away from the traditional understanding of the left, and toward a more pro-Western, pro-European and social-liberal worldview. Having formed what was dubbed a 'liberal' tripartite coalition, he signed the accords for Bulgaria's entry into the European Union and NATO, while also implementing economic reforms that were criticised as being neoliberal and contrary to socialism, such as the flat tax that replaced progressive taxation in the country. Because of this, he became highly polarizing within the socialist party, generating harsh internal opposition and leading to the defection of the party's leftmost wing, the 'Marxist platform'. Having decisively lost in the 2009 election, he was successful in managing to form a government after the 2013 election, however his approach backfired, as it required the parliamentary support of the pro-Turkish Movement for Rights and Freedoms and nationalist Attack, both of which proved incredibly controversial. This led to protests, culminating in the resignations of both Stanishev and the government. Following the end of his chairmanship, the party adopted what was popularly dubbed the "anti-Stanishev amendment", which effectively barred him from returning to this position in the future. Stanishev then left Bulgarian politics and instead moved to the European level, where he was elected as the chairman for the Party of European Socialists.

=== Mikov era ===
Mihail Mikov entered into his chairmanship under a promise to "consolidate and modernise" the party, as well as "protect its socialist and social democratic ideals", adding that the party's foremost responsibility was "the rehabilitation of the social state". However the unpopularity of the government led to a major decrease in support for the BSP, due to its association with the pro-Turkish Movement for Rights and Freedoms and nationalist Attack. In the 2014 Bulgarian parliamentary election the party obtained its worst result on record by that point. Mikov accepted responsibility for the result and chose to go into opposition. He nevertheless ran for re-election as Chairman of the Socialist Party, but lost to Korneliya Ninova, thus becoming the first incumbent socialist chairman to lose his bid for re-election. Ninova then became the first woman to be elected as the party's chairperson.

=== Ninova era ===
Ninova's initial approach to managing the party was to present for election independent popular candidates, who nevertheless shared much of the socialists' worldview, as the party's candidates. This was exemplified by her decision to back Rumen Radev, previously the non-partisan head of the Bulgarian Air Force in the 2016 Bulgarian presidential election. Radev, though nominally running as an independent candidate, was still nominated by the socialists and ran with Iliana Iotova, a leading socialist, as Vice president. This proved to be a recipe for success, as Radev convincingly defeated GERB candidate Tsetska Tsacheva in the election and was elected as President of Bulgaria. Ninova then managed moderate improvements in the party's electoral performance during the 2019 European Parliament election in Bulgaria. Despite this, the socialists were not able to overtake GERB and Ninova handed in her resignation, only to withdraw it shortly before it was due to be voted. The party also improved its results in the 2019 Bulgarian local elections, increasing its support across the board in the Bulgarian local scene and even winning some districts of the capital Sofia, a city known as a bastion of centre-right and right-wing politics. The socialists even nearly managed to win the position of Mayor of Sofia, with the party's candidate Maya Manolova narrowly losing out to the incumbent Yordanka Fandakova.

However and much more controversially, around this time Ninova began to shift the party's orientation toward traditionalism and social conservatism, advocating against same-sex marriage and the Istanbul Convention, as well as taking a harsh stance against perceived 'gender ideology'.

These changes to the party's philosophy also proved very internally divisive, and many factions formed to oppose Ninova within her own party, further galvanized by the fact that Ninova had taken part in privatization deals during the 90s. This internal opposition also accused Ninova of acting in a very authoritarian manner in attempting to crush internal dissent, comparing her to SDS leader Ivan Kostov. Because of this, the party suffered numerous defections. Several party branches disassociated themselves from the party, Maya Manolova refused to renew her membership and instead went on to form her own party Stand Up.BG, a significant portion of the party's parliamentary caucus left to form the Bulgarian Progressive Line, while a portion of the party's old-school membership left to form the Left Union for a Clean and Holy Republic, a broad left-wing alliance led by former BSP Chairman Zhan Videnov. Tatyana Doncheva's Movement 21 also refused to align itself with its former mother party, the BSP, and instead chose to join Stand Up.BG in creating the Stand Up.BG! We are coming! alliance. A faction of those within the internal opposition that still remained in the party formed the 'Socialism of the 21st century platform', which stated that it would fight Ninova's 'usurpation' of the party and work to 'restore the public image of socialism as the path to a more just and secure society'. According to this internal platform, the party under Ninova had become a leaderist power broker party, separated from its 150-year history.

Due to these and other reasons, the BSP obtained poor results during three consecutive snap parliamentary elections held in 2021, with the party obtaining its worst electoral result in its history. Due to this bad electoral performance, Ninova was asked, but refused to resign from her post. However, many party organizations, including the BSP's own youth wing demanded that she resign, which she agreed to do the following day. However, Ninova later stated that her resignation was not yet valid and she would remain the party's chairperson until a congress approved it at an undefined later date. Nevertheless, the BSP's national council gave Ninova its approval for her to negotiate the BSP's support for a government led by We Continue the Change, the new pro-Radev party that had won the November election.

In late November 2021, BSP agreed to enter the Petkov Government.

In August 2023, BSP leader Korneliya Ninova highlighted her party's role in amending Bulgaria's Protection Against Domestic Violence Act, asserting that the changes uphold the Constitution. The revised "intimate relationship" definition specifies male and female, extending protection to relationships lasting over 60 days. The amendment, adopted during an extraordinary parliamentary session, sparked debate on gender inclusivity and was met with criticisms regarding the timeline of protection.

=== Post-Ninova Interim Leadership period ===
Following the parties poor performance in June 2024 Bulgarian parliamentary election, a number of figures within the party, including the leader of the youth wing, Gabriel Vulkov, called on Ninova to resign. On 11 June, two days after the elections, Korneliya Ninova announced her intention to resign her position as Chairwoman of the party, classifying the parties electoral results as "catastrophic". Ninova announced that an acting chairperson from within the ranks of her deputies would be chosen in the following days by the parties National Council, who would be tasked with carrying out direct elections of the Chairperson in the autumn. She refused to confirm or deny if she would present her own candidacy in such an election.

The National Council was scheduled to convene to discuss the question of electing an Acting Chairperson, among other questions relating to internal party affairs, on 15 June. Prior to the convention of the National Council, deputy-chairman of the party, Georgi Svilenski claimed there was a conspiracy within the party among the previous leadership in order to carry out a coup. Additionally, Korneliya Ninova wrote a post in which she clarified that together with her resignation she had tendered the resignation of the entire Executive Commission of the party and called on the National Council to not engage in revanchism, confirming that she herself would not be present at the meeting of the National Council.

Following the meeting of the National Council, it was announced that MP Atanas Zafirov was elected as acting Chairman, with a majority of 104 votes. The meeting of the National Council also chose to undo the appointment of Svilenski as head of the parliamentary group, instead choosing to appoint Borislav Gutsanov. In his first official statement, Zafirov denied the fact that a coup had taken place and promised to carry out fair elections for leadership positions within the party. He further confirmed that BSP would not support a government led by either GERB or DPS. The parties new leadership also made clear that it wished to reconcile with expelled members of BSP, as well as President Radev.

One of the first contentious decisions undertaken by the new leadership, was the removal of Kaloyan Metodiev from the Parliamentary Group. Metodiev, a former head of the SDS Youth Wing in the early 2000s, was seen as a close advisor to the party's former leader, Korneliya Ninova. Therefore, the vote to remove him created a division within the parliamentary group between the old and new leadership.

On 29 June, the parties control commission made a number of decisions which similarly seemed to attack the old leadership. For one, the Control Commission officially decided that Korneliya Ninova could not contest the upcoming Chairperson elections, as she had already served two terms in that capacity. The Control Commission further repealed the removal of Ivan Takov as head of the Sofia City organisation of the party, thus officially restoring him to that position.

Takov's reinstatement was opposed by the recently elected leader of the BSP-Sofia organisation, Diana Toneva, who noted that she had already been legally registered as the leader of the organisation and argued that the Conference of the cities organisation which had elected her was legitimate.

Throughout July, the conflict between supporters and opponents of Ninova and conversely the new leadership intensified. Svilenski, a key Ninova ally, called on BSP members to support Ninova's nomination in spite of the control council decision.

For their part, the new leadership intensified efforts to create a new left-wing alliance which would include political projects formed by dissident BSP members. This effort culminated prior to the annual rally of the Bulgarian Socialist Party at Buzludzha, where the formation of such a left-wing alliance was announced. Ninova, for her part, called for a boycott of the rally organised by the official leadership, and carried out her own event a few days later.

== Election results ==
=== National Assembly ===
Election	Coalition	Votes	%	Seats	+/–	Government
Election	Coalition	(Coalition totals)		(Coalition totals)		Government
1990	None	2,887,766	47.15 (1st)	211 / 400		Majority
1991	Pre-Electoral Union	1,836,050	33.14 (2nd)	106 / 240	▼105	Opposition (1991-1992)
1991	Pre-Electoral Union	1,836,050	33.14 (2nd)	106 / 240	▼105	Support (1992-1994)
1994	Democratic Left	2,262,943	43.50 (1st)	125 / 240	▲19	Majority
1997	Democratic Left	939,308	22.07 (2nd)	58 / 240	▼67	Opposition
2001	Coalition for Bulgaria	783,372	17.15 (3rd)	48 / 240	▼10	Opposition
2005	Coalition for Bulgaria	1,129,196	30.95 (1st)	82 / 240	▲34	Coalition
2009	Coalition for Bulgaria	748,114	17.70 (2nd)	40 / 240	▼42	Opposition
2013	Coalition for Bulgaria	942,541	26.61 (1st)	84 / 240	▲44	Coalition
2014	BSP – Left Bulgaria	505,527	15.40 (2nd)	39 / 240	▼45	Opposition
2017	BSP for Bulgaria	955,490	27.20 (2nd)	80 / 240	▲41	Opposition
Apr 2021	BSP for Bulgaria	480,146	15.01 (3rd)	43 / 240	▼37	Snap election
Jul 2021	BSP for Bulgaria	365,695	13.39 (3rd)	36 / 240	▼7	Snap election
Nov 2021	BSP for Bulgaria	267,817	10.21 (4th)	26 / 240	▼10	Coalition
2022	BSP for Bulgaria	232,958	9.30 (5th)	25 / 240	▼1	Snap election
2023	BSP for Bulgaria	225,914	8.93 (5th)	23 / 240	▼2	Opposition
Jun 2024	BSP for Bulgaria	151,560	6.85 (5th)	19 / 240	▼4	Snap election
Oct 2024	BSP – United Left	184,403	7.32 (5th)	20 / 240	▲1	Coalition
2026	BSP – United Left	97,753	2.97 (8th)	0 / 240	▼19	Extra-parliamentary

=== European Parliament ===
European Parliament
Election	List leader	Votes	%	Seats	+/–	EP Group
2007	Kristian Vigenin	414,786	21.41 (#2)	5 / 18	New	PES
2009	Ivaylo Kalfin	476,618	18.50 (#2)	4 / 18	▼1	S&D
2014	Sergei Stanishev	424,037	18.93 (#2)	4 / 17	0	S&D
2019	Elena Yoncheva	474,160	24.26 (#2)	5 / 17	▲1	S&D
2024	Kristian Vigenin	141,178	7,01 (#5)	2 / 17	▼3	S&D

=== President ===
Presidential elections
Election	Candidate	First round			Second round		
Election	Candidate	Votes	%	Rank	Votes	%	Result
1992	Velko Valkanov	1,549,970	30.44	2nd	2,443,434	47.15	Lost
1996	Ivan Marazov	1,158,204	27.01	2nd	1,687,242	40.27	Lost
2001	Georgi Parvanov	1,032,665	36.39	1st	2,043,443	54.13	Won
2006	Georgi Parvanov	1,780,119	64.05	1st	2,050,488	75.95	Won
2011	Ivaylo Kalfin	974,300	28.96	2nd	1,531,193	47.42	Lost
2016	Rumen Radev	973,754	25.44	1st	2,063,032	59.37	Won
2021	Rumen Radev	1,322,385	49.42	1st	1,539,650	66.72	Won
2026	Iliana Iotova	528,951	34.76	1st	1,093,852	57.56	Won

== Symbols and logos ==
Old party logo

== Bibliography ==
- Bell, John D. (2009). Bulgaria In Transition: Politics, Economics, Society, and Culture after Communism. Routledge. ISBN 9780429723834 – via Google Books.
- Jeffries, Ian (2002). Eastern Europe at the Turn of the Twenty-First Century: A Guide to the Economies in Transition (illustrated ed.). Routledge. ISBN 9781134561513 – via Google Books.
- Popivanov, Boris (2014). Changing Images of the Left in Bulgaria: An Old-and-New Divide? (illustrated ed.). Columbia University Press. ISBN 9783838267173 – via Google Books.
- Spirova, Maria (2007). Political Parties in Post-Communist Societies: Formation, Persistence, and Change (illustrated ed.). Springer. ISBN 9780230605664 – via Google Books.
