= Tax evasion =

Financial crime

Tax evasion or tax fraud is an illegal attempt to defeat the imposition of taxes by individuals, corporations, trusts, and others. Tax evasion often entails the deliberate misrepresentation of the taxpayer's affairs to the tax authorities to reduce the taxpayer's tax liability, and it includes dishonest tax reporting, declaring less income, profits or gains than the amounts actually earned, overstating deductions, bribing authorities and hiding money in secret locations.

Tax evasion is an activity commonly associated with the informal economy. One measure of the extent of tax evasion (the "tax gap") is the amount of unreported income, which is the difference between the amount of income that the tax authority requests be reported and the actual amount reported.

In contrast, tax avoidance is the legal use of tax laws to reduce one's tax burden. Both tax evasion and tax avoidance can be viewed as forms of tax noncompliance, as they describe a range of activities that intend to subvert a state's tax system, but such classification of tax avoidance is disputable since avoidance is lawful in self-creating systems. Both tax evasion and tax avoidance can be practiced by corporations, trusts, or individuals.

== Economics ==
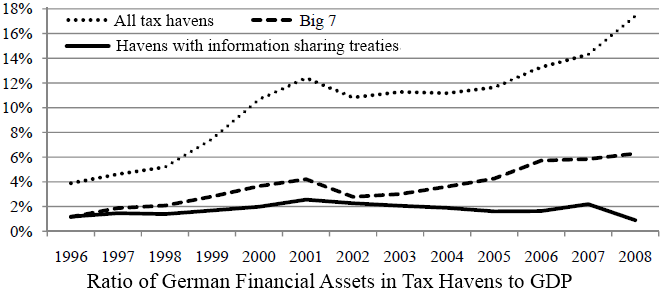
The ratio of German assets in tax havens in relation to the total German GDP, 1996–2008. The "Big 7" shown are Hong Kong, Ireland, Lebanon, Liberia, Panama, Singapore, and Switzerland.

In 1968, Nobel laureate economist Gary Becker first theorized the economics of crime, on the basis of which authors Michael G. Allingham and Agnar Sandmo produced, in 1972, an economic model of tax evasion. This model deals with the evasion of income tax, the main source of tax revenue in developed countries. The authors analyse the decision of a risk-averse agent who maximizes her utility by choosing the optimal level of undeclared income. According to the authors, the level of evasion of income tax depends on the detection probability and the level of punishment provided by law and the level of risk aversion. Later studies, however, pointed out limitations of the model, highlighting that individuals are also more likely to comply with taxes when they believe that tax money is appropriately used and when they can take part in public decisions.

The literature's theoretical models are elegant in their effort to identify the variables likely to affect non-compliance. Alternative specifications, however, yield conflicting results concerning both the signs and magnitudes of variables believed to affect tax evasion. Empirical work is required to resolve the theoretical ambiguities. Income tax evasion appears to be positively influenced by the tax rate, the unemployment rate, the level of income and dissatisfaction with government. The U.S. Tax Reform Act of 1986 appears to have reduced tax evasion in the United States.

In a 2017 study Alstadsæter et al. concluded based on random stratified audits and leaked data that occurrence of tax evasion rises sharply as amount of wealth rises and that the 0.01% richest are about 10 times more likely than average people to engage in tax evasion and they evade as much as 25% of their taxes.

== Tax gap ==
U.S. Treasury Department estimates of unpaid taxes indicate that over half of all unpaid taxes are attributable to the top 5% of earners.

The tax gap describes how much tax should have been raised in relation to much tax is actually raised. The IRS defines the gross tax gap as the difference between the true tax liability for a given year and the taxes actually remitted on time. It comprises the non-filing gap, the underreporting gap, and the underpayment (or remittance) gap. Voluntary tax compliance in the U.S. is approximately 85% of taxes actually due, leaving a gross tax gap of about 15%.

The tax gap is growing mainly because of two factors, the lack of enforcement on the one hand and the lack of compliance on the other hand. The former is mainly rooted in the costly enforcement of the taxation law. The latter is based on the foundation that tax compliance is costly for individuals as well as firms (tax filling, bureaucracy), hence not paying taxes would be more economical in their opinion.

== Evasion of customs duty ==
Customs duties are an important source of revenue in developing countries. Importers attempt to evade customs duty by (a) under-invoicing and (b) misdeclaration of quantity and product-description. When there is ad valorem import duty, the tax base can be reduced through under-invoicing. Misdeclaration of quantity is more relevant for products with specific duty. Production description is changed to match a H. S. Code commensurate with a lower or no rate of duty.

=== Smuggling ===
Smuggling is import or export of products by illegal means. Smuggling is resorted to for total evasion of customs duties, as well as for the import and export of contraband. Smugglers do not pay duty since the transport is covert, so no customs declaration is made.

== Evasion of value-added tax and sales taxes ==
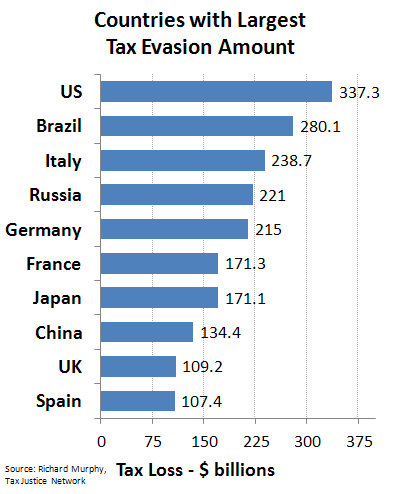
Tax campaigner Richard Murphy's estimate of the ten countries with the largest absolute levels of tax evasion. He estimated that global tax evasion amounts to 5 percent of the global economy.

During the second half of the 20th century, value-added tax (VAT) emerged as a modern form of consumption tax throughout the world, with the notable exception of the United States. Producers who collect VAT from consumers may evade tax by under-reporting the amount of sales. The US has no broad-based consumption tax at the federal level, and no state currently collects VAT; the overwhelming majority of states instead collect sales taxes. Canada uses both a VAT at the federal level (the Goods and Services Tax) and sales taxes at the provincial level; some provinces have a single tax combining both forms.

In addition, most jurisdictions which levy a VAT or sales tax also legally require their residents to report and pay the tax on items purchased in another jurisdiction. This means that consumers who purchase something in a lower-taxed or untaxed jurisdiction with the intention of avoiding VAT or sales tax in their home jurisdiction are technically breaking the law in most cases.

This is especially prevalent in federal countries like the United States and Canada where sub-national jurisdictions charge varying rates of VAT or sales tax.

In liberal democracies, a fundamental problem with inhibiting evasion of local sales taxes is that liberal democracies, by their very nature, have few (if any) border controls between their internal jurisdictions. Therefore, it is not generally cost-effective to enforce tax collection on low-value goods carried in private vehicles from one jurisdiction to another with a different tax rate. However, sub-national governments will normally seek to collect sales tax on high-value items such as cars.

== Objectives to evade taxes ==
One reason for taxpayers to evade taxes is the various personal financial benefits that come with it; however, the degree of evasion of taxes is likely attributed to how much risk an individual is willing to take. Additionally, Wallschutzky's exchange relationship hypothesis presents as a sufficient motive for many. The exchange relationship hypothesis states that tax payers believe that the exchange between their taxes and the public good/social services as unbalanced. Furthermore, the little capability of the system to catch the tax evaders reduces associated risk. Most often, it is more economical to evade taxes, being caught and paying a fine as a consequence, than paying the accumulated tax burden over the years. Thus, evasion numbers should be even higher than they are, hence for many people there seem to be moral objective countering this practice.

== Government response ==
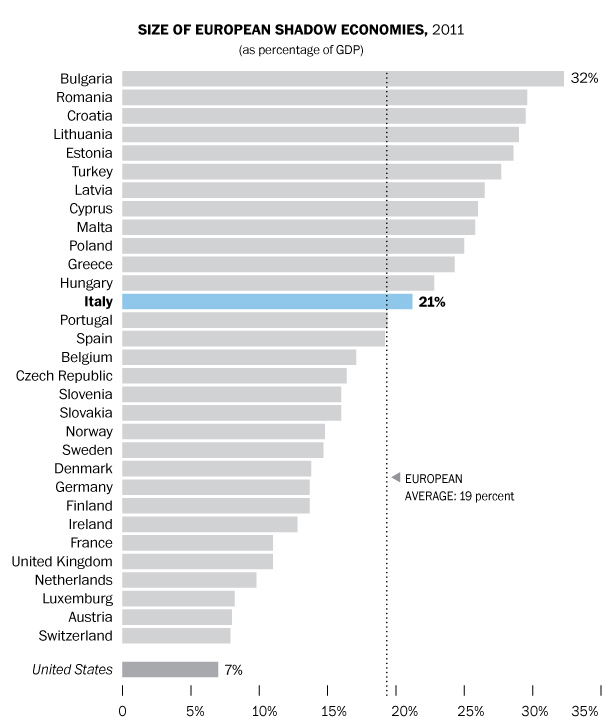
The size of the shadow economy in Europe, 2011

The level of evasion depends on a number of factors, including the amount of money a person or a corporation possesses. Efforts to evade income tax decline when the amounts involved are lower. The level of evasion also depends on the efficiency of the tax administration. Corruption by tax officials makes it difficult to control evasion. Tax administrations use various means to reduce evasion and increase the level of enforcement: for example, privatization of tax enforcement or tax farming.

In 2011, HMRC, the UK tax collection agency stated that it would continue to crack down on tax evasion, with the goal of collecting £18 billion in revenue before 2015. In 2010, HMRC began a voluntary amnesty program that targeted middle-class professionals and raised £500 million.

=== Corruption by tax officials ===
Corrupt tax officials co-operate with the taxpayers who intend to evade taxes. When they detect an instance of evasion, they refrain from reporting it in return for bribes. Corruption by tax officials is a serious problem for the tax administration in many countries.

=== Level of evasion and punishment ===
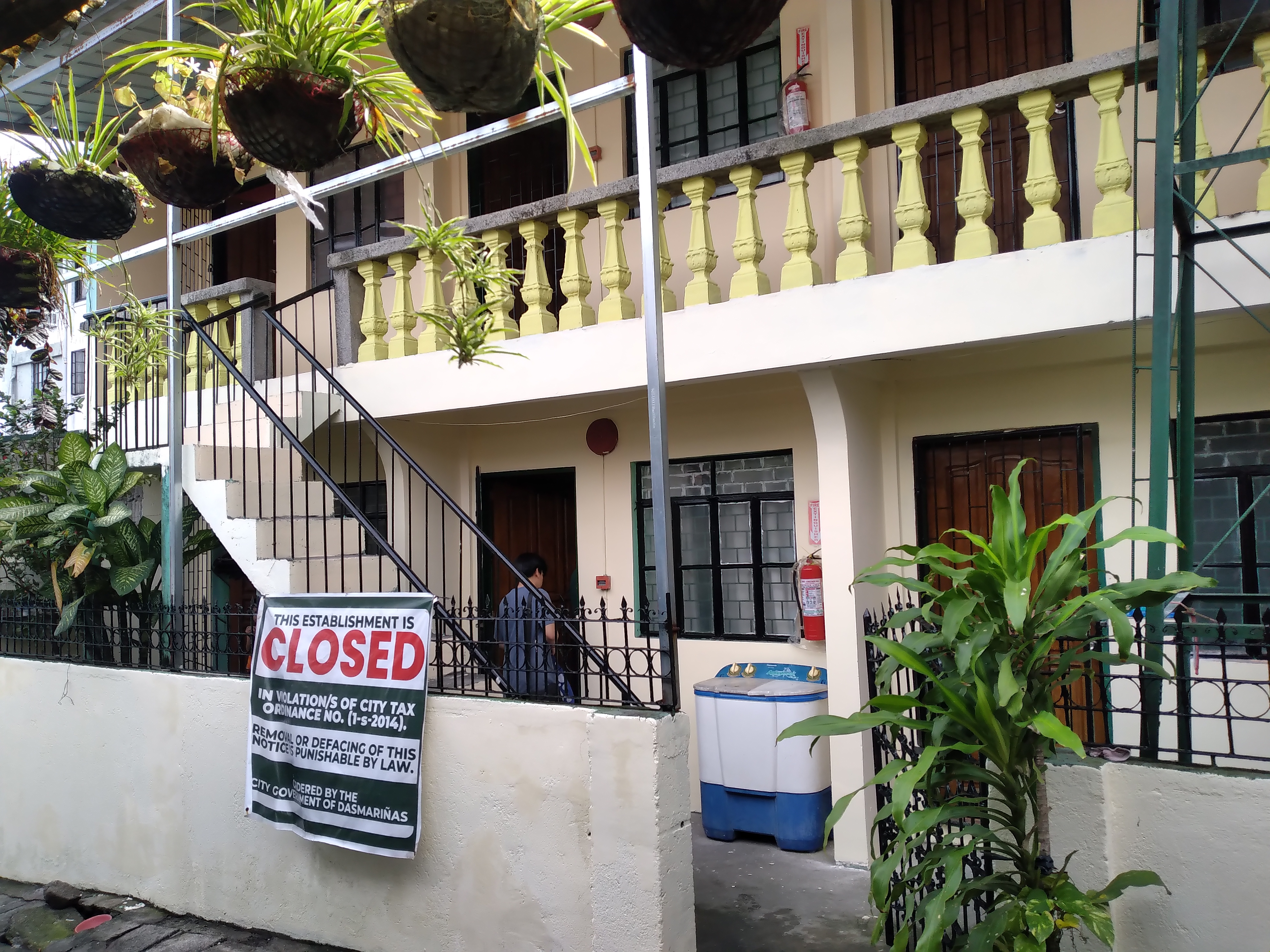
An apartment building in the Philippines closed for property tax evasion.

Tax evasion is a crime in almost all developed countries, and the guilty party is liable to fines and/or imprisonment. In Switzerland, many acts that would amount to criminal tax evasion in other countries are treated as civil matters. Dishonestly misreporting income in a tax return is not necessarily considered a crime. Such matters are handled in the Swiss tax courts, not the criminal courts.

In Switzerland, however, some tax misconduct (such as the deliberate falsification of records) is criminal. Moreover, civil tax transgressions may give rise to penalties. It is often considered that the extent of evasion depends on the severity of punishment for evasion.

=== Privatization of tax enforcement ===
A "Lion's Mouth" postbox for anonymous denunciations at the Doge's Palace in Venice, Italy. Text translation: "Secret denunciations against anyone who will conceal favors and services or will collude to hide the true revenue from them."

Professor Christopher Hood first suggested privatization of tax enforcement to control tax evasion more efficiently than a government department would, and some governments have adopted this approach. In Bangladesh, customs administration was partly privatized in 1991.

Abuse by private tax collectors (see tax farming below) has on occasion led to revolutionary overthrow of governments who have outsourced tax administration.

=== Tax farming ===
Tax farming is a historical means of collection of revenue. Governments received a lump sum in advance from a private entity, which then collects and retains the revenue and bears the risk of evasion by the taxpayers. It has been suggested that tax farming may reduce tax evasion in less developed countries.

This system may be liable to abuse by the "tax-farmers" seeking to make a profit, if they are not subject to political constraints. Abuses by tax farmers (together with a tax system that exempted the aristocracy) were a primary reason for the French Revolution that toppled Louis XVI.

=== PSI agencies ===
Pre-shipment inspection agencies like Société Générale De Surveillance S. A. and its subsidiary Cotecna are in business to prevent evasion of customs duty through under-invoicing and misdeclaration.

However, PSI agencies have cooperated with importers in evading customs duties. Bangladeshi authorities found Cotecna guilty of complicity with importers for evasion of customs duties on a huge scale. In August 2005, Bangladesh had hired four PSI companies – Cotecna Inspection SA, SGS (Bangladesh) Limited, Bureau Veritas BIVAC (Bangladesh) Limited and INtertek Testing Limited – for three years to certify price, quality and quantity of imported goods. In March 2008, the Bangladeshi National Board of Revenue cancelled Cotecna's certificate for serious irregularities, while importers' complaints about the other three PSI companies mounted. Bangladesh planned to have its customs department train its officials in "WTO valuation, trade policy, ASYCUDA system, risk management" to take over the inspections.

Cotecna was also found to have bribed Pakistan's prime minister Benazir Bhutto to secure a PSI contract by Pakistani importers. She and her husband were sentenced both in Pakistan and Switzerland.

== By region ==
=== India ===
The Indian government's deficiency in governmental expenditures is most notably attributed to wide spread tax evasion. Relative to other developing countries, the fact that India's income tax comprises 5% of its GDP is due to the fact nearly 2–3% of the population is exposed to income taxation. India faces more difficulties in proliferating its income tax than a country like China, who subjects 20% of its population, because there is an emphatically low amount of formal wage earners. Even though India's income tax was instituted in 1922 by the British, their tax history explains their high degree of tax delinquency today. With effect from 1 April 2017, the Income-tax Act, 1961 has introduced the General Anti-avoidance Rules. The intent of the bringing the said rules is to curb the ill-practices of the tax payers & tax practitioners assisting the tax payers in avoiding the tax where the tax impact of the arrangement or the transactions is more than INR Three Crores in a particular Financial Year. GAAR intends to cover the cases where the main purpose of the transaction is to obtain the tax benefit. It is pertinent to note that recently due to BEPS project by OECD & G 20 Member nations, there was huge hue and cry by the Inclusive Framework countries, where every country was trying to protect their respective tax base. Accordingly, basis the Action Plan Report 6 of the BEPS Project, member nations were required to adopt PPT test as a minimum standard. The said standard re-enshrines that where " one of the principal purposes of the transaction is to obtain tax benefit" then treaty benefit will not be allowed. Thus, presently in Indian context most of the treaties entered into by India, includes such minimum standard, accordingly where one of the principal purposes of the transaction is to obtain tax benefit, treaty benefit will be denied. This has posed several difficulties for MNCs who have routed their investments through Island Countries in India such as Mauritius, which though has a very good- Double tax avoidance treaty with India but with PPT all the benefits could be questioned due to want of Substance & PPT test requirements. The same was considered recently by Authority for Advance Rulings, New Delhi in ruling for Tiger Global International II Holdings,

=== United Arab Emirates ===
In early October 2021, 11.9 million leaked financial records in addition to 2.9 TB of data was released in the name of Pandora Papers by the International Consortium of Investigative Journalists (ICIJ), exposing the secret offshore accounts of around 35 world leaders in tax havens to evade taxes. One of the many leaders to be exposed was the ruler of Dubai and prime minister of the United Arab Emirates, Sheikh Mohammed bin Rashid al-Maktoum. Sheikh Mohammed was identified as the shareholder of three firms that were registered in the tax havens of Bahamas and British Virgin Islands through an Emirati company, partially owned by an investment conglomerate, Dubai Holding and Axiom Limited, major shares of which were owned by the ruler.

As per the leaked records, the Dubai ruler owned a massive number of upmarket and luxurious real estate across Europe via the cited offshore entities registered in tax havens.

Additionally, the Pandora Papers also cites that the former Managing Director of IMF and French finance minister, Dominique Strauss-Kahn was permitted to create a consulting firm in the United Arab Emirates in 2018 after the expiry of tax exemptions of his Moroccan company, which he used for receiving millions of dollars' worth of tax free consulting fees.

=== Germany, France, Italy, Denmark, Belgium ===
A network of banks, stock traders and top lawyers has obtained billions from the European treasuries through suspected fraud and speculation with dividend tax. The five hardest hit countries have lost together at least $62.9 billion. Germany is the hardest hit country, with around €31 billion withdrawn from the German treasury. Estimated losses for other countries include at least €17 billion for France, €4.5 billion in Italy, €1.7 billion in Denmark and €201 million for Belgium.

=== Scandinavia ===
A paper by economists Annette Alstadsæter, Niels Johannesen and Gabriel Zucman, which used data from HSBC Switzerland ("Swiss leaks") and Mossack Fonseca ("Panama Papers"), found that "on average about 3% of personal taxes are evaded in Scandinavia, but this figure rises to about 30% in the top 0.01% of the wealth distribution... Taking tax evasion into account increases the rise in inequality seen in tax data since the 1970s markedly, highlighting the need to move beyond tax data to capture income and wealth at the top, even in countries where tax compliance is generally high. We also find that after reducing tax evasion—by using tax amnesties—tax evaders do not legally avoid taxes more. This result suggests that fighting tax evasion can be an effective way to collect more tax revenue from the ultra-wealthy."

=== United Kingdom ===
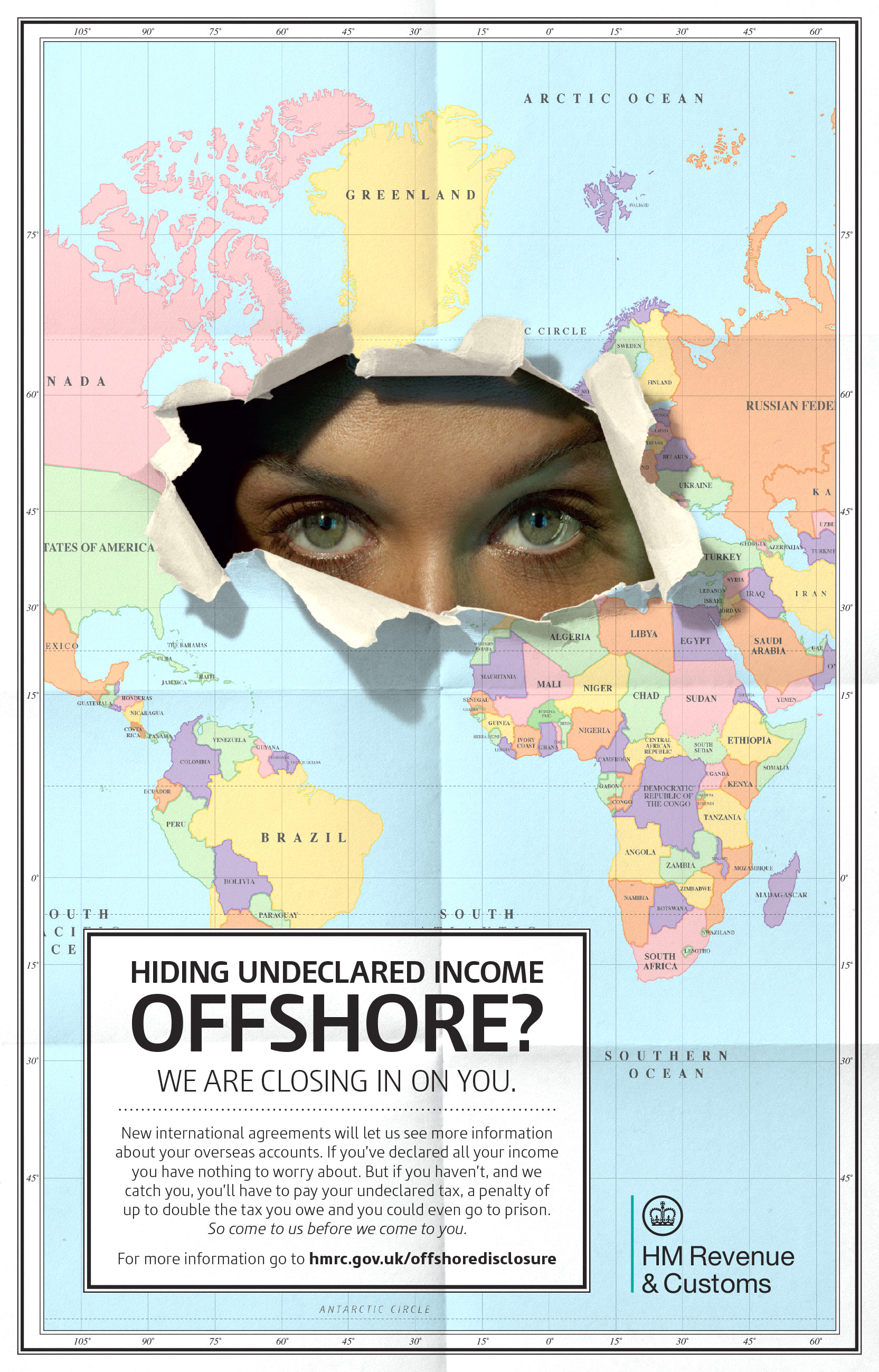
Propaganda poster issued by the British tax authorities to counter offshore tax evasion

HMRC, the UK tax collection agency, estimated that in the tax year 2016–17, pure tax evasion (i.e. not including things like hidden economy or criminal activity) cost the government £5.3 billion. This compared to a wider tax gap (the difference between the amount of tax that should, in theory, be collected by HMRC, against what is actually collected) of £33 billion in the same year, an amount that represented 5.7% of liabilities. At the same time, tax avoidance was estimated at £1.7 billion (this does not include international tax arrangements that cannot be challenged under the UK law, including some forms of base erosion and profit shifting (BEPS)).

In 2013, the Coalition government announced a crackdown on economic crime. It created a new criminal offence for aiding tax evasion and removed the requirement for tax investigation authorities to prove "intent to evade tax" to prosecute offenders.

In 2015, Chancellor of the Exchequer George Osborne promised to collect £5 billion by "waging war" on tax evaders by announcing new powers for HMRC to target people with offshore bank accounts. The number of people prosecuted for tax evasion doubled in 2014/15 from the year before to 1,258.

=== United States ===
In the United States of America, Federal tax evasion is defined as the purposeful, illegal attempt to evade the assessment or the payment of a tax imposed by federal law. Conviction of tax evasion may result in fines and imprisonment, such as five years in prison on each count of tax evasion.

The Internal Revenue Service (IRS) has identified small businesses and sole proprietors as the largest contributors to the tax gap between what Americans owe in federal taxes and what the federal government receives. Small businesses and sole proprietorships contribute to the tax gap because there are few ways for the government to know about skimming or non-reporting of income without mounting significant investigations.

As of 2007 the most common means of tax evasion was overstatement of charitable contributions, particularly church donations.

==== Estimates of lost government revenue ====
The IRS estimates that the 2001 tax gap was $345 billion and that the 2006 tax gap was $450 billion. A study of the 2008 tax gap found a range of $450–$500 billion, and unreported income to be about $2 trillion, concluding that 18 to 19 percent of total reportable income was not being properly reported to the IRS. In 2024 the IRS projected a gross tax gap of $696 billion for tax year 2022.

=== Other ===
- 2008 Liechtenstein tax affair
- Offshore Leaks, 2013
- LuxLeaks, 2014
- Swiss Leaks, 2015
- Bahamas Leaks, 2016
- Football Leaks, 2016
- Panama Papers, 2016
  - List of people named in the Panama Papers
- Paradise Papers, 2017
  - List of people and organisations named in the Paradise Papers
- Azerbaijani laundromat, 2017
- Mauritius Leaks, 2019
- FinCEN Files, 2020
- Pandora Papers, 2021
  - List of people named in the Pandora Papers
- Suisse Secrets, 2022

== Tax evasion and income ==
Generally, individuals tend to evade taxes, while companies rather avoid taxes. Studies suggest that 8% of global financial wealth lies in offshore accounts. Often, offshore wealth that is stored in tax havens stays undetected in random audits. According to Alstadsæter, Johannesen and Zucman 2019 the extent of taxes evaded is substantially higher with higher income, and exceptionally higher among people of the top wealth group. In line with this, the probability to appear in the Panama Papers rises significantly among the top 0.01% of the wealth group, as does the probability to own an unreported account at HSBC. However, the upper wealth group is also more inclined to use tax amnesty.

== See also ==
- Attorney–client privilege
- Digital invoice customs exchange
- Fuel dyes
- Global Forum on Transparency and Exchange of Information for Tax Purposes
- Informal sector
- Land value tax
- Tax information exchange agreements
- Tax resistance
  - History of tax resistance
- Taxation as slavery
- Taxation as theft
- Unreported employment
- U.S. taxation of illegal income
- Tax fraud schemes and detection
