= Linkurious =

French software company

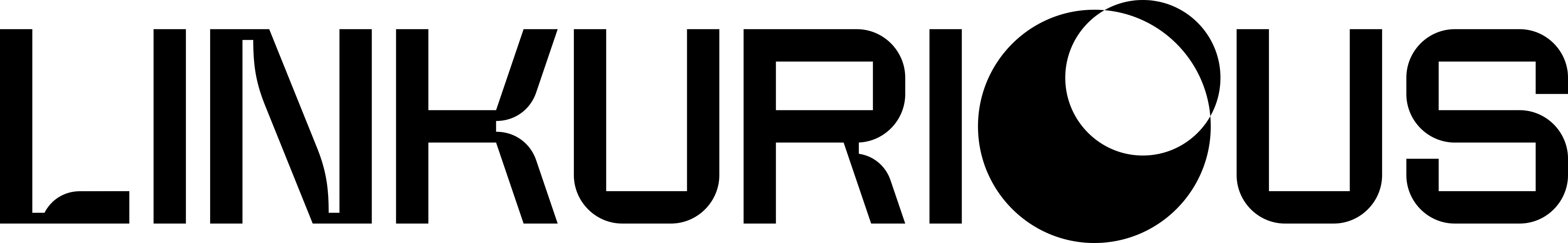
- Type: Graph data visualization and analytics
- Industry: software
- Founded: 1 January 2013; 13 years ago in Paris, France
- Founder: Sébastien Heymann, David Rapin, Jean Villedieu
- Headquarters: Paris, France
- Website: linkurious.com

Linkurious is a software company specialized in graph-based technology for various use cases such as financial crime, intelligence, cybersecurity, supply chain management or data governance.

Since 2024, Linkurious offers an integrated contextual decision intelligence platform powered by native graph technology and entity resolution AI.

Linkurious works with a variety of world-class technology and consulting partners including Microsoft, Amazon, Neo4j, Nuix, Capgemini, PwC or Deloitte.

The company has offices in Montreuil, France and Bethesda, MD, USA.

== History ==
Linkurious was founded in 2013 by Sébastien Heymann, David Rapin and Jean Villedieu following the development of Gephi, which was inspired by the prototype for Stanford's Center for Spatial and Textual Analysis project Mapping the Republic of Letters and looked at connections across thousands of communities in Europe and North America during The Enlightenment.

In 2023, Linkurious is listed in the TOP 250 French software companies and receives the "International" award of the Year granted by Ernst & Young and Numeum.

In December 2025, Nuix Ltd., a data analytics and intelligence software company headquartered in Australia, announced it has signed an agreement to acquire Linkurious.

On 20th April 2026 the Nuix acquisition of Linkurious was closed (https://ir.miraqle.com/DownloadFile.axd?file=/Report/ComNews/20260420/03080593.pdf)

== Products ==
Linkurious provides entity resolution, case management capabilities as well as detection, data search, visualization and exploration capabilities for various graph databases such as Neo4j, Azure Cosmos DB, Memgraph, Amazon Neptune, Google Spanner Graph, TitanDB, DataStax, AllegroGraph and FalkorDB (formerly RedisGraph).

Linkurious has developed a JavaScript graph visualization library named Ogma. It provides a graphics engine based on WebGL and supports older machines with HTML5 Canvas.

Linkurious' graph visualization tool is used for NASA's Lessons Learned database, identifying connections between seemingly unlikely subjects, such as a correlation between contaminated fluid and battery fire risk.

== Applications ==
=== Panama Papers ===
The International Consortium of Investigative Journalists (ICIJ) used a commercial version of Linkurious and Neo4j in the investigation of the Panama Papers, uncovering 4.8 million leaked files consisting of emails, 3 million database entries, 2.2 million PDFs, 1.2 million images, 320,000 text files, and 2242 files, evidence of money laundering, tax evasion or political corruption.

=== Swiss Leaks ===
The ICIJ also utilized the software during the Swiss Leaks investigation that revealed a massive tax evasion scheme in which 180.6 billion euros passed through HSBC accounts.

=== FinCEN files ===
In 2020, the ICIJ used the software and Neo4j to visualize and explore the FinCEN Files’ 400 spreadsheets containing data on 100,000 transactions.

=== Pandora Papers ===
In 2021, the ICIJ leveraged the capabilities of Linkurious and Neo4j once more to analyse the data from the Pandora Papers. The leak involved 14 different offshore services firms and 11.9 million records, amounting to 2.94 terabytes. The network visualisations were able to help organise and explain the data.

=== Justice for Myanmar ===
The campaign group Justice for Myanmar used the software to map the financial connections of the Myanmar military and publish the "Cartel Finance Map".

=== Obsalytics ===
The non-profit organization Obsalytics combined Linkurious and open data to understand the main power structures and financial flows in Syria.

=== The Sentry ===
The Sentry, a US-based investigative and policy organization that seeks to disable multinational predatory networks that benefit from violent conflict, repression, and kleptocracy, uses Linkurious combined with Neo4j graph database to leverage over 150 million pieces of data for their investigations.

=== Media4change ===
The "Karštos pėdos" tool developed by the international movement Media4change provides transparency around the connections between politicians and public figures and public-sector funding to journalists and to the general public. The organization used Linkurious technology to demonstrate how national and EU funds are used in Lithuania.
