= Panama Papers =

2016 document leak scandal

Countries with politicians, public officials or close associates implicated in the leak on April 15, 2016 (as of May 19, 2016)

The Panama Papers (Spanish: Papeles de Panamá) are 11.5 million leaked documents (2.6 terabytes of data) published from April 3, 2016. The papers detail financial and attorney–client information for more than 214,488 offshore entities. These documents, some dating back to the 1970s, were created by, and taken from, the former Panamanian offshore law firm and corporate service provider Mossack Fonseca, and compiled with similar leaks into a searchable database.

The documents contain personal financial information about wealthy individuals and public officials previously private. Their publication made it possible to prosecute Jan Marsalek, a person of interest to a number of European governments and revealed his links with Russian intelligence, and international financial fraudster Harald Joachim von der Goltz. While offshore business entities are legal, reporters found that some of the Mossack Fonseca shell corporations were used for illegal purposes, including fraud, tax evasion, and evading international sanctions.

"John Doe", the whistleblower who leaked the documents to journalist Bastian Obermayer from the German national newspaper Süddeutsche Zeitung (SZ), remains anonymous, apparently even to the journalists who worked on the investigation. "My life is in danger", the whistleblower told them. In a document (released on May 6, 2016), Doe cited income inequality as the reason for the action and said the documents were leaked "simply because I understood enough about their contents to realize the scale of the injustices they described". Doe stated that he had never worked for any government or intelligence agency and expressed willingness to help prosecutors if granted immunity from prosecution. After SZ verified that the statement did in fact come from the source for the Panama Papers, the International Consortium of Investigative Journalists (ICIJ) posted the full document on its website.

SZ asked the ICIJ for help because of the data involved. Journalists from 107 media organizations in 80 countries analyzed documents detailing the operations of the law firm. After more than a year of analysis, the first news stories were published on April 3, 2016, along with 150 of the documents themselves. The project represents an important milestone in the use of data journalism software tools and mobile collaboration.

The documents were dubbed the Panama Papers because of the country they were leaked from. Still, the Panamanian government, as well as other entities in Panama and elsewhere, expressed strong objections to the name over concerns that it would tarnish the government's and country's image worldwide. Some media outlets covering the story have used the name "Mossack Fonseca papers".

In June 2024, a judge in Panama acquitted all former Mossack Fonseca employees, including the two founders, due to insufficient evidence and problems with the chain of custody of evidence.

== Disclosures ==
In addition to the much-covered business dealings of British prime minister David Cameron and Icelandic prime minister Sigmundur Davíð Gunnlaugsson, the leaked documents also contain identity information about the shareholders and directors of 214,000 shell companies set up by Mossack Fonseca, as well as some of their financial transactions. Although it is generally not against the law to own an offshore shell company, reporters found that some of the shell corporations were used for illegal purposes, including fraud, tax evasion, and evading international sanctions.

The journalists on the investigative team found business transactions by many important figures in world politics, sports, and art. While many of the transactions were legal, since the data is incomplete, questions remain in many other cases; still others seem to clearly indicate ethical if not legal impropriety. Some disclosures – tax avoidance in very poor countries by very wealthy entities and individuals for example – led to questions on moral grounds. For example, the shell company Octea is registered to Beny Steinmetz and owes more than US$700,000 in property taxes to the city of Koidu in Sierra Leone, and is $150 million in debt, even though its exports were more than twice that in an average month in the 2012–2015 period. Steinmetz himself has a personal worth of $6 billion.

Other offshore shell company transactions described in the documents seem to have broken exchange laws, violated trade sanctions or stemmed from political corruption, according to ICIJ reporters. For example:

- Uruguay has arrested five people and charged them with money laundering through Mossack Fonseca shell companies for a Mexican drug cartel.
- Ouestaf, an ICIJ partner in the investigation, reported that it had discovered new evidence that Karim Wade received payments from DP World (DP). He and a long-time friend were convicted of this in a trial that the United Nations and Amnesty International said was unfair and violated the defendants' rights. The Ouestaf article does not address the conduct of the trial, but does say that Ouestaf journalists found Mossack Fonseca documents showing payments to Wade via a DP subsidiary and a shell company registered to the friend.
- Swiss lawyer Dieter Neupert has been accused of mishandling client funds and helping both oligarchs and the Qatari royal family to hide money.

Named in the leak were 12 extant or former world leaders; 128 other public officials and politicians; and hundreds of celebrities, businessmen, and other wealthy individuals from over 200 countries.

One notable case involved former Iceland prime minister Sigmundur Davíð Gunnlaugsson, who was found to possess a secret offshore account in a shell company called Wintris Inc., along with his wife. When Gunnlaugsson was elected in 2013, he had promised to be tougher on Iceland's foreign creditors. However, as revealed by the Panama Papers, Wintris Inc., which he and his wife owned a stake in, was one of these creditors. This conflict of interest ultimately led to his resignation in 2016.

== Tax haven ==
From a leaked internal memorandum

Ninety-five per cent of our work coincidentally consists in selling vehicles to avoid taxes.

— Mossack Fonseca

Individuals and entities may open offshore accounts for any number of reasons, some of which are legal. A Canadian lawyer based in Dubai noted, for example, that businesses might wish to avoid falling under Islamic inheritance jurisprudence if an owner dies. Businesses in some countries may wish to hold some of their funds in dollars also, said a Brazilian lawyer. Estate planning is another example of legal tax avoidance.

American filmmaker Stanley Kubrick had an estimated personal worth of $20 million when he died in 1999, much of it invested in an 18th-century English manor he bought in 1978. He lived in that manor for the rest of his life, filming scenes from The Shining, Full Metal Jacket, and Eyes Wide Shut there as well. Three holding companies set up by Mossack Fonseca now own the property, and are in turn held by trusts set up for his children and grandchildren. Since Kubrick was an American living in Britain, without the trust his estate would have had to pay transfer taxes to both governments and possibly have been forced to sell the property to obtain the liquid assets to pay them. Kubrick is buried on the grounds along with one of his daughters, and the rest of his family still lives there.

Other uses are more ambiguous. Chinese companies may incorporate offshore in order to raise foreign capital, normally against the law in China. In some of the world's hereditary dictatorships, the law may be on the side of the elite who use offshore companies to award oil contracts to themselves, or gold concessions to their children, however such dealings are sometimes prosecuted under international law.

While no standard official definition exists, The Economist and the International Monetary Fund describe an offshore financial center, or tax haven, as a jurisdiction whose banking infrastructure primarily provides services to people or businesses who do not live there, requires little or no disclosure of information when doing business, and offers low taxes.

"The most obvious use of offshore financial centers is to avoid taxes", The Economist added. Oxfam blamed tax havens in its 2016 annual report on income inequality for much of the widening gap between rich and poor. "Tax havens are at the core of a global system that allows large corporations and wealthy individuals to avoid paying their fair share," said Raymond C. Offenheiser, president of Oxfam America, "depriving governments, rich and poor, of the resources they need to provide vital public services and tackle rising inequality".

International Monetary Fund (IMF) researchers estimated in July 2015 that profit shifting by multinational companies costs developing countries around US$213 billion a year, almost two percent of their national income.

Real estate in London, where housing prices increased 50% from 2007 to 2016, also is frequently purchased by overseas investors. Donald Toon, then head of Britain's National Crime Agency, said in 2015 that "the London property market has been skewed by laundered money. Prices are being artificially driven up by overseas criminals who want to sequester their assets here in the UK". Three-quarters of Londoners under 35 cannot afford to buy a home.

Andy Yan, an urban planning researcher and adjunct professor at the University of British Columbia, studied real estate sales in Vancouver—also thought to be affected by foreign purchasers—found that 18% of the transactions in Vancouver's most expensive neighborhoods were cash purchases, and 66% of the owners appeared to be Chinese nationals or recent arrivals from China. Calls for more data on foreign investors have been rejected by the provincial government. Chinese nationals accounted for 70% of 2014 Vancouver home sales for more than CA$3 million. On June 24, 2016, China CITIC Bank Corp filed suit in Canada against a Chinese citizen who borrowed CN¥50 million for his lumber business in China, but then withdrew roughly CA$7.5 million from the line of credit and left the country. He bought three houses in Vancouver and Surrey, British Columbia together valued at CA$7.3 million during a three-month period in June 2014.

=== International banking ===
"This issue will surely be raised at the G20 summit," predicted Tomasz Kozlowski, Ambassador of the European Union (EU) to India. "We need to strengthen international cooperation for the exchange of tax information between tax authorities". Panama, Vanuatu and Lebanon may find themselves on a list of uncooperative tax havens that the Organisation for Economic Co-operation and Development (OECD) re-activated in July 2016 at the request of G20 nations, warned Le Monde, a French newspaper that participated in the investigation. Those three countries followed none of the OECD's three broad guidelines for international banking cooperation:

- information exchange on request
- a signed multilateral agreement on information standards
- a commitment to implement automated information exchange in 2017 or 2018

The OECD, the G20, or the European Union could also institute another list of countries that are inadequate in more than one area. Countries meeting none of these criteria, such as Panama, Vanuatu and Lebanon, would go on the blacklist. Countries that meet only one criterion would go on the greylist. In April 2016, if this greylist had been in place it would have included nine countries: Antigua and Barbuda, Bahrain, Brunei, Dominica, Liberia, Nauru, Samoa, Tobago and the United Arab Emirates.

== Illegal activities ==
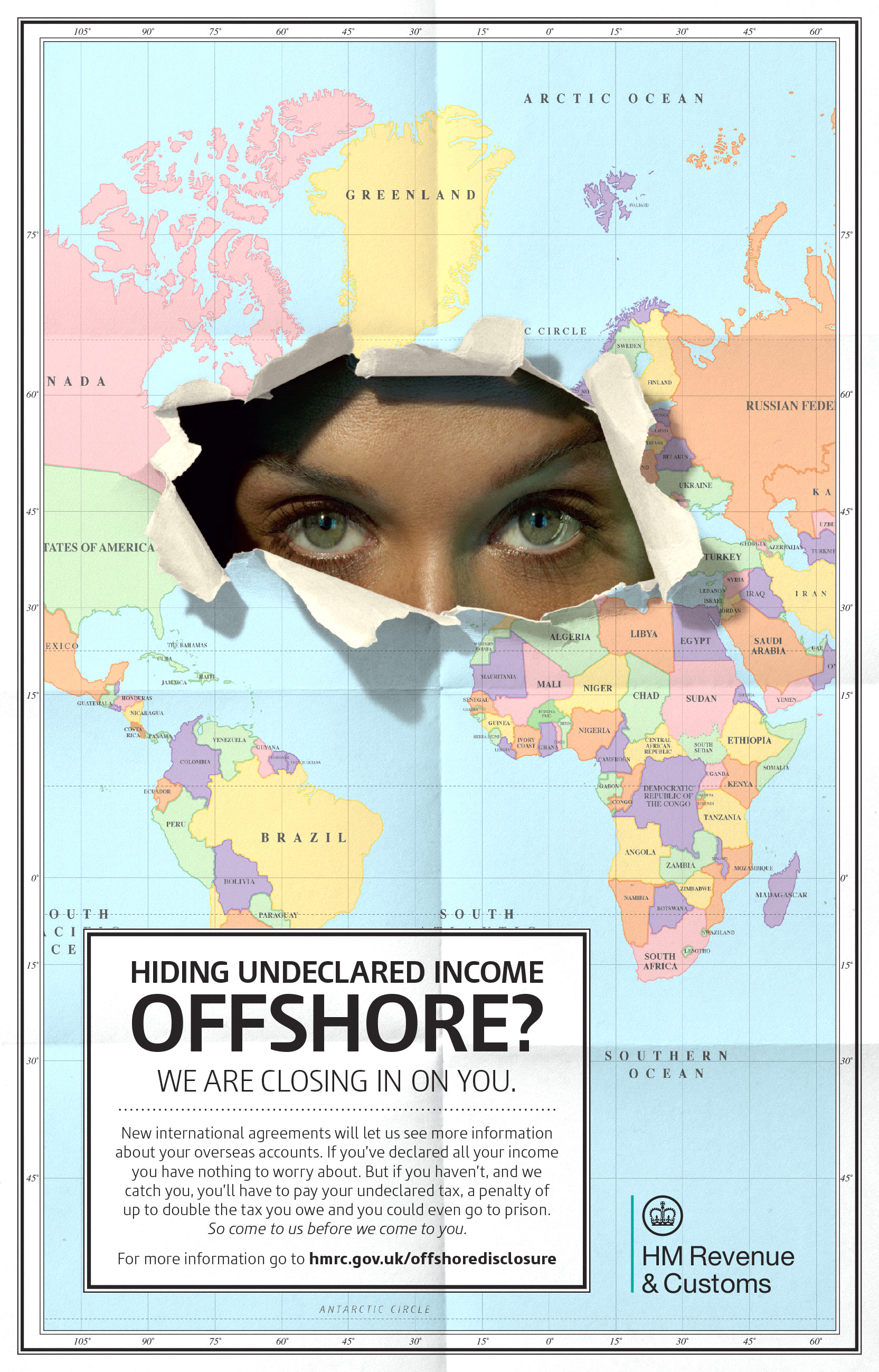
Poster issued by the British tax authorities to counter offshore tax evasion

While offshore business entities are not illegal in the jurisdictions where they are registered, and often not illegal at all, reporters found that some Mossack Fonseca shell corporations seem to have been used for illegal purposes including fraud, kleptocracy, tax evasion and evading international sanctions.

Offshore companies are legal, said Panamanian lawyer and former comptroller of the republic Alvin Weeden; illegality arises when they are used for money laundering, arms smuggling, terrorism, or tax evasion.

On October 22, 2016, during a state visit to Germany, Varela told journalist Jenny Pérez, of Deutsche Welle that there had been "progress" in transparency and many agreements to exchange tax information, and that tax evasion was a global problem. Asked about his ties with Ramón Fonseca Mora, managing partner of the firm Mossack Fonseca, he acknowledged that he is a friend.

In October 2020, German authorities issued an international arrest warrant for the two founders of the law firm at the core of the tax evasion scandal exposed by the Panama Papers. Cologne prosecutors sought German-born Jürgen Mossack and Panamanian Ramón Fonseca on charges of accessory to tax evasion and forming a criminal organization.

Igor Angelini, head of Europol's Financial Intelligence Group, said that shell companies "play an important role in large-scale money laundering activities" and that they are often a means to "transfer bribe money". Tax Justice Network concluded in a 2012 report that "designing commercial tax abuse schemes and turning a blind eye upon suspicious transactions have become an inherent part of the work of bankers and accountants".

Money laundering affects the first world as well, since a favored shell company investment is real estate in Europe and North America. London, Miami, New York, Paris, Vancouver and San Francisco have all been affected. The practice of parking assets in luxury real estate has been frequently cited as fueling rocketing housing prices in Miami, where the Miami Association of Realtors said that cash sales accounted for 90% of new home sales in 2015. "There is a huge amount of dirty money flowing into Miami that's disguised as investment," according to former congressional investigator Jack Blum. In Miami, 76% of condo owners pay cash (as opposed to using a mortgage), a practice considered a red flag for money-laundering, as of 2016. Analysis from Redfin in 2022 found that 31.9% of houses were purchased with cash across the 39 largest metropolitan areas in the US. This is higher than the sub 25% cash purchase rate as seen during the purchase of the Panama papers.

Leaked documents also indicate that the firm would also backdate documents on request and, based on a 2007 exchange of emails in the leaked documents, it did so routinely enough to establish a price structure: $8.75 per month in the past. In 2008, Mossack Fonseca hired a 90-year-old British man to pretend to be the owner of the offshore company of Marianna Olszewski, a US businesswoman, "a blatant breach of anti–money laundering rules" according to the BBC.

=== Recovered money ===
In April 2019, the ICIJ and European newspapers reported that the global tally of recovered sums from litigation, fines and back taxes exceeded $1.2 billion. Great Britain recovered the largest amount ($253 million), followed by Denmark ($237 million), Germany ($183 million), Spain ($164 million), France ($136 million) and Australia ($93 million). Colombia recovered $89 million, the highest amount for any South or Central American country. As of August 2019, investigations are ongoing in Austria, Canada and Switzerland, and many other countries are conducting inspections of companies and private individuals revealed in the report.

== Newsroom logistics ==
The ICIJ helped organize the research and document review once Süddeutsche Zeitung (SZ) realized the scale of the work required to validate the authenticity of 2.6 terabytes of leaked data. The group enlisted reporters and resources from a variety of outlets including The Guardian, BBC, Le Monde, SonntagsZeitung, Falter, La Nación, German broadcasters NDR and WDR, and Austrian broadcaster ORF. Ultimately, "reporters at 100 news media outlets working in 25 languages had used the documents" to investigate individuals and organizations associated with Mossack Fonseca.

Operations security factored in a number of project management considerations. Saying "my life is in danger," one anonymous "John Doe" insisted that reporters communicate over encrypted channels only and agreed that they would never meet face-to-face.

SZ also had concerns about security, not only for their source, the leaked documents, and their data, but also for the safety of some of their partners in the investigation living under corrupt regimes who might not want their money-handling practices made public. They stored the data in a room with limited physical access on air-gapped computers that were never connected to the Internet. The Guardian also limited access to its journalists' project work area. To make it even harder to sabotage the computers or steal their drives, SZ journalists made them more tamper-evident by painting the screws holding the drives in place with glitter nail polish.

Reporters sorted the documents into a huge file structure containing a folder for each shell company, which held the associated emails, contracts, transcripts, and scanned documents Mossack Fonseca had generated while doing business with the company or administering it on a client's behalf. Some 4.8 million leaked files were emails, 3 million were database entries, 2.2 million PDFs, 1.2 million images, 320,000 text files, and 2242 files in other formats.

Journalists indexed the documents using open software packages Apache Solr and Apache Tika, and accessed them by means of a custom interface built on top of Blacklight. Süddeutsche Zeitung reporters also used Nuix for this, which is proprietary software donated by an Australian company also named Nuix.

Using Nuix, Süddeutsche Zeitung reporters performed optical character recognition (OCR) processing on the millions of scanned documents, converting the data they contained to searchable and machine-readable text. Most project reporters then used Neo4J and Linkurious to extract individual and corporate names from the documents for analysis, but some who had access to Nuix used it for this as well. Reporters cross-referenced the compiled lists of people against the processed documents, then analyzed the information, trying to connect people, roles, monetary flow, and structure legality.

US banking and SEC expert David P. Weber assisted journalists in reviewing information from the Panama Papers.

Additional stories were released based on this data, and the full list of companies was released in early May 2016. The ICIJ later announced the release on May 9, 2016, of a searchable database containing information on over 200,000 offshore entities implicated in the Panama Papers investigation and more than 100,000 additional companies implicated in the 2013 Offshore Leaks investigation. Mossack Fonseca asked the ICIJ not to publish the leaked documents from its database. "We have sent a cease and desist letter," the company said in a statement.

The sheer quantity of leaked data greatly exceeds the WikiLeaks Cablegate leak in 2010 (1.7 GB), Offshore Leaks in 2013 (260 GB), the 2014 Lux Leaks (4 GB), and the 3.3 GB Swiss Leaks of 2015. For comparison, the 2.6 TB of the Panama Papers equals approximately 2,660 GB.

== Data security ==
Mossack Fonseca notified its clients on April 1, 2016, that it had sustained an email hack. Mossack Fonseca also told news sources that the company had been hacked and always operated within the law.

Data security experts noted, however, that the company had not been encrypting its emails and furthermore seemed to have been running a three-year-old version of Drupal with several known vulnerabilities. According to James Sanders of TechRepublic, Drupal ran on the Apache 2.2.15 version from March 6, 2010, the Oracle fork of Apache, which by default allows users to view directory structure.

The network architecture was also inherently insecure; the email and web servers were not segmented from the client database in any way.

Some reports also suggest that some parts of the site may have been running WordPress with an out-of-date version of Slider Revolution, a plugin whose previously announced vulnerabilities are well-documented.

A grey hat hacker named 1×0123 announced on April 12 that Mossack Fonseca's content management system had not been secured from SQL injection, a well-known database attack vector, and that he had been able to access the customer database because of this.

Computer security expert Chris Kubecka announced on May 24, 2016, that the Mossack Fonseca client login portal was running four different government-grade remote access trojans (RATs). Kubecka confirmed there were still numerous critical vulnerabilities, too many open ports in their infrastructure and internet access to their archive server due to weak security. Kubecka explained how each data security issue was discovered in detail in a book titled Down the Rabbit Hole: An OSINT Journey.

== Leak and leak journalism ==
Gerard Ryle, director of the ICIJ, called the leak "probably the biggest blow the offshore world has ever taken because of the extent of the documents". Edward Snowden described the release in a Twitter message as the "biggest leak in the history of data journalism". The ICIJ also said that the leak was "likely to be one of the most explosive [leaks of inside information in history] in the nature of its revelations".

"This is a unique opportunity to test the effectiveness of leaktivism", said Micah White, co-founder of Occupy, "... the Panama Papers are being dissected via an unprecedented collaboration between hundreds of highly credible international journalists who have been working secretly for a year. This is the global professionalization of leaktivism. The days of WikiLeaks amateurism are over."

WikiLeaks spokesperson Kristinn Hrafnsson, an Icelandic investigative journalist who worked on Cablegate in 2010, said withholding some documents for a time does maximise the leak's impact, but called for full online publication of the Panama Papers eventually. A tweet from WikiLeaks criticized the decision of the ICIJ not to release everything for ethical reasons: "If you censor more than 99% of the documents you are engaged in 1% journalism by definition."

The whistleblower reported that the murder of journalists Daphne Caruana Galizia in 2017 and Ján Kuciak in 2018 due to their investigations of the Panama Papers had deeply affected him and called upon the European Union to deliver justice.

== People named ==
Reports from April 3 note the law firm's many connections to high-ranking political figures and their relatives, as well as celebrities and business figures. Among other things, the leaked documents illustrate how wealthy individuals, including public officials, can keep personal financial information private.

Initial reports identified five then-heads of state or government leaders from Argentina, Iceland, Saudi Arabia, Ukraine, and the United Arab Emirates as well as government officials, close relatives, and close associates of various heads of government of more than forty other countries. Names of then-current national leaders in the documents include President Khalifa bin Zayed Al Nahyan of the United Arab Emirates, Petro Poroshenko of Ukraine, King Salman of Saudi Arabia, and the Prime Minister of Iceland, Sigmundur Davíð Gunnlaugsson.

Former heads of state mentioned in the papers include:

- Argentinian president Mauricio Macri who was president from December 2015 to December 2019. Moreover, the moral problem, the opposers claimed illegality because he never put this in his patrimonial declarations. For one of the official sources of Panama papers: "Macri's official spokesman Ivan Pavlovsky said that the Argentine president didn't list Fleg Trading Ltd. as an asset because he had no capital participation in the company. The company, used to participate in interests in Brazil, was related to the family business group. "This is why Mauricio Macri was occasionally its director," he said, reiterating that Macri was not a shareholder."
- Sudanese president Ahmed al-Mirghani, who was president from 1986–1989 and died in 2008.
- Former Emir of Qatar Hamad bin Khalifa Al Thani owned Afrodille S.A., which had a bank account in Luxembourg and shares in two South African companies. Al Thani also held a majority of the shares in Rienne S.A. and Yalis S.A., holding a term deposit with the Bank of China in Luxembourg. A relative owned 25 percent of these: Sheikh Hamad bin Jassim Al Thani, Qatar's former prime minister and foreign minister.

Former prime ministers:

- Prime Minister Bidzina Ivanishvili of Georgia
- Pavlo Lazarenko of Ukraine
- Prime Minister Ayad Allawi, a former vice president of Iraq, owned property through Mossack Fonseca shell companies registered in Panama and the British Virgin Islands, for security reasons following an assassination attempt, according to his spokesperson, who added that any income from the properties was reported and taxes paid "promptly and on time".
- Ion Sturza of Moldova.
- Ali Abu al-Ragheb of Jordan.

The leaked files identified 61 family members and associates of prime ministers, presidents and kings, including:

- the brother-in-law of China's paramount leader Xi Jinping
- the son of former Malaysian Prime Minister Najib Razak
- children of former Prime Minister of Pakistan Nawaz Sharif
- children of Azerbaijani President Ilham Aliyev
- Clive Khulubuse Zuma, the nephew of former South African President Jacob Zuma
- Nurali Aliyev, the grandson of Kazakh President Nursultan Nazarbayev
- Mounir Majidi, the personal secretary of Moroccan King Mohammed VI
- Kojo Annan, the son of former United Nations Secretary-General Kofi Annan
- Mark Thatcher, the son of former British Prime Minister Margaret Thatcher
- Juan Armando Hinojosa, the "favourite contractor" of Mexican President Enrique Peña Nieto.
- Spanish Royal Family: Infanta Pilar, Duchess of Badajoz and her son Bruno Gómez-Acebes, Iñaki Urdangarín, Amalio de Marichalar, and people close to the family like the mistress of former King Juan Carlos I, Corinna Larsen.

Other clients included less senior government officials and their close relatives and associates, from over forty countries.

Over £10 million of cash from the sale of the gold stolen in the 1983 Brink's-Mat robbery was laundered, first unwittingly and later with the complicity of Mossack Fonseca, through a Panamanian company, Feberion Inc. The company was set up on behalf of an unnamed client twelve months after the robbery. The Brinks money was put through Feberion and other front companies, through banks in Switzerland, Liechtenstein, Jersey, and the Isle of Man. It issued bearer shares only. Two nominee directors from Sark were appointed to Feberion by Jersey-based offshore specialist Centre Services. The offshore firms recycled the funds through land and property transactions in the United Kingdom. Although the Metropolitan Police Service raided the offices of Centre Services in late 1986 in cooperation with Jersey authorities, and seized papers and two Feberion bearer shares, it wasn't until 1995 that Brink's-Mat's solicitors were finally able to take control of Feberion and the assets.

Actor Jackie Chan is mentioned in the leaked documents as a shareholder in six companies based in the British Virgin Islands.

=== Client services ===
Mossack Fonseca is one of the biggest in its field and the biggest financial institutions refer customers to it. Its services to clients include incorporating and operating shell companies in friendly jurisdictions on their behalf. They can include creating "complex shell company structures" that, while legal, also allow the firm's clients "to operate behind an often impenetrable wall of secrecy". The leaked papers detail some of their intricate, multilevel, and multinational corporate structures. Mossack Fonseca has acted with global consultancy partners like Emirates Asset Management Ltd, Ryan Mohanlal Ltd, Sun Hedge Invest and Blue Capital Ltd on behalf of more than 300,000 companies, most of them registered in the British Overseas Territories.

=== Sanctioned clients ===
Many firms and individuals take advantage of the anonymity of offshore shell companies to circumvent international sanctions. More than 30 Mossack Fonseca clients were at some point in time blacklisted by the US Treasury Department, including businesses linked to senior figures in Russia, Syria and North Korea.

Three Mossack Fonseca companies started for clients of Helene Mathieu Legal Consultants were later sanctioned by the US Treasury's Office of Foreign Assets Control (OFAC). Pangates International Corporation was accused in July 2014 of supplying the government of Syria with "a large amount of specialty petroleum products" with "limited civilian application in Syria". The other two, Maxima Middle East Trading and Morgan Additives Manufacturing Co, and their owners Wael Abdulkarim and Ahmad Barqawi, were said to have "engaged in deceptive measures" to supply oil products to Syria.

Mossack Fonseca also ran six businesses for Rami Makhlouf, cousin of the former Syrian President Bashar al-Assad, despite US sanctions against him. Internal Mossack Fonseca documents show that in 2011 Mossack Fonseca rejected a recommendation by their own compliance team to sever ties to Mr. Makhlouf. They agreed to do so only months later. The firm has said it never knowingly allowed anyone connected with rogue regimes to use its companies.

Frederik Obermaier, co-author of the Panama Papers story and an investigative reporter at the German newspaper Süddeutsche Zeitung, told Democracy Now: "Mossack Fonseca realised that Makhlouf was the cousin, and they realised that he was sanctioned, and they realised that he's allegedly one of the financiers of the Syrian regime. And they said, 'Oh, there is this bank who still does business with him, so we should still keep with him, as well'."

HSBC also appeared to reassure Mossack Fonseca not only that it was "comfortable" with Makhlouf as a client but suggested there could be a rapprochement with the Assad family by the US. Makhlouf is already known to be a long-standing client of HSBC's Swiss private bank, holding at least $15 million with it in multiple accounts in 2006. The Panamanian files also show HSBC provided financial services to a Makhlouf company called Drex Technologies, which HSBC said was a company of "good standing".

DCB Finance, a Virgin Islands-based shell company founded by North Korean banker Kim Chol-sam and British banker Nigel Cowie, also ignored international sanctions and continued to do business with North Korea with the help of the Panamanian firm. The US Treasury Department in 2013 called DCB Finance a front company for Daedong Credit Bank and announced sanctions against both companies for providing banking services to North Korean arms dealer Korea Mining and Development Trading Corporation, attempting to evade sanctions against that country, and helping to sell arms and expand North Korea's nuclear weapons programme. Cowie said the holding company was used for legitimate business and he was not aware of illicit transactions.

Mossack Fonseca, required by international banking standards to avoid money laundering or fraudster clients, is, like all banks, supposed to be particularly alert for signs of corruption with politically exposed persons (PEP), in other words, clients who either are or have close ties to government officials. However they somehow failed to turn up any red flags concerning Tareq Abbas even though he shares a family name with the president of Palestine, and sat on the board of directors of a company with four fellow directors the firm did deem PEP because of their ties to Palestinian politics. Yet Mossack Fonseca actually did and documented due diligence research, including a Google search.

== Clients of Mossack Fonseca ==
Mossack Fonseca has managed more than 300,000 companies over the years. The number of active companies peaked at more than 80,000 in 2009. Over 210,000 companies in twenty-one jurisdictions figure in the leaks. More than half were incorporated in the British Virgin Islands, with others in Panama, the Bahamas, the Seychelles, Niue, and Samoa. Mossack Fonseca's clients came from more than 100 countries. Most of the corporate clients were from Hong Kong, Switzerland, the United Kingdom, Luxembourg, Panama, and Cyprus. Mossack Fonseca worked with more than 14,000 banks, law firms, incorporators, and others to set up companies, foundations, and trusts for their clients. Some 3,100 companies listed in the database appear to have ties to US offshore specialists, and 3,500 shareholders of offshore companies list US addresses. Mossack Fonseca has offices in Nevada and Wyoming.

The leaked documents indicate that about US$2 trillion has passed through the firm's hands. Several of the holding companies that appear in the documents did business with sanctioned entities, such as arms merchants and relatives of dictators, during the time that the sanctions were in place. The firm provided services to a Seychelles company named Pangates International, which the US government believes supplied aviation fuel to the Syrian government during the then current civil war, and continued to handle its paperwork and certify it as a company in good standing, despite sanctions, until August 2015.

More than 500 banks registered nearly 15,600 shell companies with Mossack Fonseca, with HSBC and its affiliates accounting for more than 2,300 of the total. Dexia and J. Safra Sarasin of Luxembourg, Credit Suisse from the Channel Islands and the Swiss UBS each requested at least 500 offshore companies for their clients. An HSBC spokesman said, "The allegations are historical, in some cases dating back 20 years, predating our significant, well-publicized reforms implemented over the last few years."

Foundations firms 'offshore' customers through banks
Headquarters	Bank	Number of foundations
Luxembourg	Experta Corporate & Trust Services (100% subsidiary of BIL)	1,659
Luxembourg	Banque J. Safra Sarasin – Luxembourg S.A.	963
United Kingdom Guernsey	Credit Suisse Channel Islands Limited	918
Monaco	HSBC Private Bank (Monaco) S.A.	778
Switzerland	HSBC Private Bank (Suisse) S.A.	733
Switzerland	UBS AG (subsidiary Rue du Rhône in Genebra)	579
United Kingdom Jersey	Coutts & Co Trustees (Jersey) Limited	487
Luxembourg	Société Générale Bank & Trust Luxembourg	465
Luxembourg	Landsbanki Luxembourg S.A.	404
United Kingdom Guernsey	Rothschild Trust Guernsey Limited	378
Spain	Banco Santander	119
Spain	BBVA	19

== Responses by Mossack Fonseca ==
In response to queries from the Miami Herald and ICIJ, Mossack Fonseca issued a 2,900-word statement listing legal requirements that prevent using offshore companies for tax avoidance and total anonymity, such as FATF protocols which require identifying ultimate beneficial owners of all companies (including offshore companies) before opening any account or transacting any business.

The Miami Herald printed the statement with an editor's note that said the statement "did not address any of the specific due diligence failings uncovered by reporters".

On Monday, April 4, Mossack Fonseca released another statement:

The facts are these: while we may have been the victim of a data breach, nothing we've seen in this illegally obtained cache of documents suggests we've done anything illegal, and that's very much in keeping with the global reputation we've built over the past 40 years of doing business the right way.

Co-founder Ramón Fonseca Mora told CNN that the reports were false, full of inaccuracies and that parties "in many of the circumstances" cited by the ICIJ "are not and have never been clients of Mossack Fonseca". The firm provided longer statements to ICIJ.

In its official statement April 6, Mossack Fonseca suggested that responsibility for any legal violations might lie with other institutions:

approximately 90% of our clientele is comprised of professional clients ... who act as intermediaries and are regulated in the jurisdiction of their business. These clients are obliged to perform due diligence on their clients in accordance with the KYC and AML regulations to which they are subject.

In an interview with Bloomberg, Jürgen Mossack said: "The cat's out of the bag, so now we have to deal with the aftermath."

He said the leak was not an "inside job"—the company had been hacked by servers based abroad. It filed a complaint with the Panamanian attorney general's office.

On April 7, 2016, Mossack resigned from Panama's Council on Foreign Relations (Conarex), even though he was not officially serving at the time. His brother Peter Mossack still serves as honorary Consul of Panama, as he has since 2010.

On May 5, 2016, Mossack Fonseca sent a cease and desist letter to the ICIJ in an attempt to stop the ICIJ from releasing the leaked documents from the Panama Papers scandal. Despite this, the ICIJ released the leaked documents on May 9, 2016.

In March 2018, Mossack Fonseca announced it would close down due to "irreversible damage" to their image caused by the Panama Papers scandal.

In October 2019, The Laundromat, a movie based on the events of the Panama Papers was released on the streaming service Netflix. Prior to this, Mossack and Fonseca issued a lawsuit in aim of preventing the release, citing defamation and potential damage to their rights of a fair trial by jury, should one begin. On July 17, 2019, the judge, based in Connecticut, refused the injunction citing lack of jurisdiction, and ordered the case be transferred to Los Angeles, California.

== Responses in Panama ==
At 5:00 am on April 3, as the news first broke, Ramón Fonseca Mora told television channel TVN he "was not responsible nor had he been accused in any tribunal".

He said the firm was the victim of a hack and that he had no responsibility for what clients did with the offshore companies that they purchased from Mossack Fonseca, which were legal under Panamanian law. Later that day, the Independent Movement (MOVIN) (Note: MOVIN: an independent political movement based in Panama, focused on influencing and monitoring the independence, efficiency and transparency of government institutions and their management.) called for calm, and expressed hope that the Panamanian justice system would not allow the culprits to go with impunity.

=== Public officials ===
By April 8, the government understood that media reports were addressing tax evasion and not attacking Panama. The then-president Varela met on Wednesday, April 7, with CANDIF, a committee of representatives from different sectors of the Panamanian economy which includes the Chamber of Commerce, Chamber of Industry and Agriculture, the National Lawyers Association, the International Lawyers Association, the Banking Association and the Stock Exchange, and entered full crisis management mode. On the same day, he announced the creation of a new judiciary tribunal and a high-level commission led by Nobel Prize Laureate Joseph Stiglitz. There were accusations that foreign forces were attacking Panama because of Panama's "stable and robust economy".

Isabel Saint Malo de Alvarado, then-Vice President of Panama, said in an op-ed piece published April 21 in The Guardian that then-President Juan Carlos Varela and his administration have strengthened Panama's controls over money laundering in the twenty months they had been in power, and that "Panama is setting up an independent commission, co-chaired by the Nobel laureate Joseph Stiglitz, to evaluate our financial system, determine best practices, and recommend measures to strengthen global financial and legal transparency. We expect its findings within the next six months, and will share the results with the international community."

However, in early August 2016, Stiglitz resigned from the committee because he learned that the Panamanian government would not commit to making their final report public. He said that he had always "assumed" that the final report would be transparent.

On April 8, then-President Varela denounced France's proposal to return Panama to a list of countries that did not cooperate with information exchange. Minister of the Presidency Alvaro Alemán categorically denied that Panama is a tax haven, and said the country would not be a scapegoat. Alemán said that talks with the French ambassador to Panama had begun.

On April 25, a meeting of the Panamanian and French finance ministers resulted in an agreement under which Panama would provide information to France about French nationals with taxable assets in the country.

The Minister of Economy and Finance of Panama, Dulcidio de la Guardia, formerly an offshore specialist at Mossack Fonseca competitor Morgan & Morgan, said the legal but often "murky" niche of establishing offshore accounts, firms and trusts make up "less than half a percentage point" of Panama's GDP. He appeared to suggest that the publication of the papers was an attack on Panama because of the high level of economic growth that the country had shown.

Eduardo Morgan of the Panamanian firm Morgan & Morgan accused the OECD of starting the scandal to avoid competition from Panama with the interests of other countries. The Panama Papers affect the image of Panama in an unfair manner and have come to light not as the result of an investigation, but of a hack, said Adolfo Linares, president of the Chamber of Commerce, Industries and Agriculture of Panama (Cciap).

The Colegio Nacional de Abogados de Panama (CNA) urged the government to sue. Political analyst Mario Rognoni said that the world perceives Panama as a tax haven. The government of then-President Juan Carlos Varela might become implicated if he tries to cover up for those involved, Rognoni said.

Economist Rolando Gordon said the affair hurts Panama, which has just emerged from the greylist of the FATF, and added that each country, especially Panama, must conduct investigations and determine whether illegal or improper acts were committed.

Panama's Lawyers Movement called the Panama Papers leak "cyber bullying" and in a press conference condemned it as an attack on the 'Panama' brand. Fraguela Alfonso, its president, called it a direct attack on the country's financial system.

I invite all organized forces of the country to create a great crusade for the rescue of the country's image.

The law firm Rubio, Álvarez, Solís & Abrego also reacted and in a press release said that "In recent decades Panama has been in the most important financial and service centers of Latin America and the entire world. As a result, all kinds of attacks on our service system have been attempted."

On October 19, 2016, it became known that a government executive had spent 370 million US dollars in order to "clean" the country's image.

=== Law enforcement ===
On April 4, 2016, the Attorney General's office announced that it would investigate Mossack Fonseca and the Panama papers. On April 12, the newly formed Second Specialized Prosecutor against Organized Crime searched the Panama City and Bella Vista offices of Mossack Fonseca for 27 hours. Following the search, the Attorney General's office stated that the purpose of the search was "to obtain documents relevant to the information published in news articles that establishes the possible use of the law firm in illegal activities". The search ended without measures against the law firm. On April 22 the same unit searched another Panama location and "secured a large amount of evidence".

The Municipality of Regulation and Supervision of Financial Subjects initiated a review of Mossack Fonseca to determine whether it had followed tax law, specifically due diligence, customer knowledge, disclosure of the final beneficiary, and the reporting of suspicious transactions to Financial Analysis Unit (UAF) operations. Some firms had been monitored since late 2015, with special attention after the publication of the Panama Papers. Violation of Panamanian law carries penalties of $5,000 to $1 million or even suspension of the firm.

The ICIJ investigation of Mossack Fonseca was reported to the Public Ministry. Samid Dan Sandoval, former candidate for mayor of Santiago de Veraguas (2014), filed legal action against the journalists and all those who had participated. He said the project name damaged the integrity, dignity and sovereignty of the country and that the consortium would have to assume legal responsibility for all damage caused to the Panamanian nation. A Change.org petition also requested the ICIJ stop using the name of Panama as in the Panama Papers. The request said the generally accepted name for the investigation "damage(d) the image" of Panama.

Attorney General of Panama Kenia Isolda Porcell Diaz announced on January 24, 2017, that she was suspending the investigations against Mossack Fonseca because it filed an appeal for protection of constitutional rights before the First Superior Court of Justice of Panama and requested that he deliver all the original documents to issue a judgment.

Mossack and Fonseca were detained on February 8, 2017, on money-laundering charges. They were initially refused bail because the court saw a flight risk, but were released on April 21, 2017 after a judge ruled they had cooperated with the investigation and ordered them each to pay $500,000 in bail.

On June 28, 2024 Judge Baloísa Marquínez acquitted the 28 accused individuals. She explained that the evidence brought against Mossack and Fonseca was insufficient and the chain of evidence was not comprehensible.

== Allegations, reactions, and investigations ==
=== Africa ===
Former South African president Thabo Mbeki, head of the African Union's panel on illicit financial flows, on April 9, 2016 called the leak "most welcome" and called on African nations to investigate the citizens of their nations who appear in the papers. His panel's 2015 report found that Africa loses $50 billion a year due to tax evasion and other illicit practices and its 50-year losses top a trillion dollars. Furthermore, he said, the Seychelles, an African nation, is the fourth most mentioned tax haven in the documents.

=== Oceania ===
==== Australia ====
On April 22, 2016, Australia said it would create a public register showing the beneficial, or actual, owners of shell companies, as part of an effort to stamp out tax avoidance by multinational corporations.

The Australian Taxation Office has announced that it is investigating 800 individual Australian taxpayers on the Mossack Fonseca list of clients and that some of the cases may be referred to the country's Serious Financial Crime Task Force. Eighty names match to an organized crime intelligence database.

Leaked documents examined by the ABC "pierced the veil of anonymous shell companies" and linked a Sydney businessman and a Brisbane geologist to mining deals in North Korea. "Rather than applying sanctions, the Australian Government and the ASX seem to have allowed a coach and horses to be ridden through them by the people involved in forming this relationship, corporate relationship with one of the primary arms manufacturers in North Korea," said Thomas Clark of the University of Technology Sydney.

David Sutton was director of AAT Corporation and EHG Corporation when they held mineral licenses in North Korea and did business with Korean Natural Resources Development and Investment Corporation, which is under United Nations sanctions, and North Korea's "primary arms dealer and main exporter of goods and equipment related to ballistic missiles and conventional weapons, responsible for approximately half of the arms exported by North Korea." The geologist, Louis Schurmann, said British billionaire Kevin Leech was key to putting the deal together. Leaked documents also reveal the involvement of another Briton, Gibraltar-based John Lister. According to ABC, the Department of Foreign Affairs and Trade was aware of these mining deals, which had also been brought up in the Australian Senate, but nobody ever referred the matter to the Australian Federal Police.

On May 12, 2016, the names of former Prime Minister of Australia Malcolm Turnbull, and former Premier of New South Wales Neville Wran, were both found in the Panama Papers, due to the pair's former directorship of the Mossack Fonseca-incorporated company Star Technology Systems Limited. Turnbull and Wran resigned from these positions in 1995, and the Prime Minister has denied any impropriety, stating "had [Star Technology] made any profits—which it did not regrettably—it certainly would have paid tax in Australia."

==== Cook Islands ====
Media initially reported that the Panama Papers lists 500 entities created under the jurisdiction of the Cook Islands, population 10,000, almost as many as Singapore, whose population is 5.7 million. After the Winebox affair, the Cook Islands gave New Zealand jurisdiction over tax matters.

==== New Zealand ====
New Zealand's Inland Revenue Department said that they were working to obtain details of people who had tax residence in the country who might have been involved in arrangements facilitated by Mossack Fonseca. Gerard Ryle, director of the ICIJ, told Radio New Zealand on April 8, 2016, that New Zealand is a well-known tax haven and a "nice front for criminals". New Zealand provides overseas investors with foreign trusts and look-through companies. New Zealand government policy is not to request disclosure of the identity of either the settlor or the beneficiaries of the trust, making the ownership secret, as well as concealing the assets from the trust-holder's home jurisdictions. These trusts are not taxed in New Zealand. These trusts can then be used to acquire and own New Zealand registered companies, which become a vehicle by which the trust owners can exercise day-to-day control over their assets. These New Zealand-registered companies can be designed not to make a profit using loans from tax havens and other profit-shifting techniques: the result being tax free income with the general respectability that has typically been associated with companies registered in New Zealand.

Prime Minister John Key responded on May 7 to John Doe's remark that he had been "curiously quiet" about tax evasion in the Cook Islands by saying that the whistleblower was confused and probably European. While the Cook Islands use New Zealand currency, "I have as much responsibility for tax in the Cook Islands as I do for taxing Russia." New Zealand does represent the Cook Islands on defence and foreign policy, but not taxation, he said.

In distancing New Zealand from the Cook Islands, Key ignored the close ties between the two countries and the crucial role New Zealand had in setting up the Cook Island taxation system.

==== Niue ====
Mossack Fonseca approached Niue in 1996 and offered to help set up a tax haven on the tiny South Sea island. The law firm drafted the necessary legislation, permitting offshore companies to operate in total secrecy. They took care of all the paperwork, the island got a modest fee for each filing, and it seemed like quite a deal, even if they were required by law now to provide all banking paperwork in Russian and Chinese as well as English.

Soon the filings almost covered the island's year budget. The US government however made official noises in 2001 about laundering criminal proceeds and Chase Bank blacklisted the island and Bank of New York followed suit. This caused inconvenience to the population so they let their contract with Mossack Fonseca expire and many of the privacy-seekers on the banking world moved on. Some did stay however, apparently; the Panama Papers database lists nearly 10,000 companies and trusts set up on Niue, population 1200.

==== Samoa ====
Many recently created shell companies were set up in Samoa, perhaps after Niue revised its tax laws. The Panama Papers database lists more than 13,000 companies and trusts set up there. Samoa has a population of roughly 200,000.

== International Federation of Association Football (FIFA) investigation ==
On May 27, 2015, the US Department of Justice indicted a number of companies and individuals for conspiracy, corruption and racketeering in connection with bribes and kickbacks paid to obtain media and marketing rights for FIFA tournaments. Some immediately entered guilty pleas.

Among those indicted were Jeffrey Webb and Jack Warner, the current and former presidents of CONCACAF, the continental confederation under FIFA headquartered in the United States. They were charged with racketeering and bribery offenses. Others were US and South American sports marketing executives who paid and agreed to pay well over $150 million in bribes and kickbacks.

On December 12, 2014, José Hawilla, the owner and founder of the Traffic Group, the Brazilian sports marketing conglomerate, waived indictment and pleaded guilty to a four-count information charging him with racketeering conspiracy, wire fraud conspiracy, money laundering conspiracy and obstruction of justice. Hawilla also agreed to forfeit over $151 million, $25 million of which was paid at the time of his plea.

Torneos & Traffic (T&T) is a subsidiary of Fox International Channels since 2005 (with investments since 2002) and is the same company involved in corrupt practices in the acquisition of rights to major South American soccer tournaments.

Many individuals mentioned in the Panama Papers are connected with the world governing body of association football, FIFA, including the former president of CONMEBOL Eugenio Figueredo; former President of UEFA Michel Platini; former secretary general of FIFA Jérôme Valcke; Argentine player for Barcelona Lionel Messi; and, from Italy, the head manager of Metro, Antonio Guglielmi.

The leak also revealed an extensive conflict of interest between a member of the FIFA Ethics Committee and former FIFA vice president Eugenio Figueredo. Swiss police searched the offices of UEFA, European football's governing body, after the naming of former secretary-general Gianni Infantino as president of FIFA. He had signed a television deal while he was at UEFA with a company called Cross Trading, which the FBI has since accused of bribery. The contract emerged among the leaked documents. Infantino has denied wrongdoing.

== See also ==
- Pumpkin Papers (1948)
- Pentagon Papers (1971)
- Swiss Leaks (2015)
- Bahamas Leaks (2016)
- Paradise Papers (2017)
- CumEx-Files (2018)
- Afghanistan Papers (2019)
- Mauritius Leaks (2019)
- Dubai Uncovered (2020)
- FinCEN Files (2020)
- Pandora Papers (2021)
- Suisse secrets (2022)
- Daphne Caruana Galizia
- Distributed Denial of Secrets
- The Laundromat (2019 film)
- Papers (2025 film)
