= Mauritius Leaks =

Tax haven leak in July 2019

The Mauritius Leaks were the report of a datajournalistic investigation by the International Consortium of Investigative Journalists (ICIJ) in 2019 about how the former British colony Mauritius has transformed itself into a thriving financial centre and tax haven.

A whistleblower leaked documents from a law firm in Mauritius to the investigative journalists, providing insight in how multinational companies avoid paying taxes when they do business in Africa, the Middle East, and Asia.

== Leak contents ==
The report was considered as evidence that laws in the country of Mauritius help corporations to avoid taxes globally, including on the continent of Africa, resulting in a loss of billions of dollars a year because of a complex, yet legal web of tax treaties and shell corporations.

At the heart of the ICIJ investigation was the law firm of Conyers Dill and Pearman with offices in Bermuda, Hong Kong, the Cayman Islands and Mauritius. More than 200,000 leaked legal documents were anonymously sent to the investigative journalists, exposing tax avoidance and evasion processes.

The AI-assisted investigative journalism project involved 54 reporters from 18 countries around the world coordinating online over many months in an encrypted workspace built by the ICIJ.

Based on large number of records since the early 1990s, the investigation revealed how a financial system based on the island diverted tax revenue from poor nations back to Western corporations through “tax treaties” with 46 mostly poorer countries, including Nigeria and India. According to Conyers the confidential papers had been “illegally obtained”.

In January 2019 (before the scandal), Mauritius overhauled the tax laws governing its offshore sector after years of complaints from its treaty partners and under pressure from international institutions.

Companies mentioned in the Mauritius Leaks were among others Aircastle and Pegasus Capital Advisers, and 8 Miles, a private equity firm established by Live Aid campaigner Bob Geldof, aiming to generate profits by buying stakes in African businesses.

== Response in Mauritius ==
Immediately after the investigation was published, the government of Mauritius denied many of the investigation's allegations. It pointed to its recent legal reforms, and claimed that its laws did not allow corporations to siphon away money that would otherwise go to other countries' taxes. Instead, it accused the associated reporters of seeking to damage the country's reputation, of acquiring the information contained in the report illegally, and of focusing on "obsolete information." The government of Mauritius has not passed any major tax reforms since the report was published, instead emphasizing the reforms passed in early 2019.

== International response ==
The leaks have also prompted responses from dozens of other countries mentioned in the documents. Journalists in affected countries published individual reports on locally relevant information revealed in the reports. In Botswana, a California-based mapping company operated a Mauritian shell corporation whose sole purpose was, according to documents found in the leak, “to benefit from Double Taxation Avoidance Agreements Between Mauritius and other countries" including Botswana. Similar reports came out regarding the activities of companies based in Uganda, Nigeria, Tanzania, India, the United Kingdom, the United States, the Netherlands, Thailand, and Namibia. Even after the scandal, some tax reform advocates called for other African countries to emulate Mauritius's tax code--in one report, a senior associate of PricewaterhouseCoopers recommended that Tanzania take up similar policies.

== See also ==
- Multinational
- Tax avoidance
- Offshore financial centre
- Corporate tax haven
- Panama Papers
- Paradise Papers
- Pandora Papers
- Bahamas Leaks
- Swiss Leaks
- Artificial intelligence
- FinCEN Files
- Corruption in Mauritius
