= Gerard Ryle =

Irish-Australian investigative reporter (born 1965)

- Born: 1965 (age 60–61); London, England, UK
- Occupation: Investigative journalist
- Known for: Director, International Consortium of Investigative Journalists

Gerard Ryle (born 1965) is an Irish-Australian investigative reporter who has written on subjects including politics, financial and medical scandals, and police corruption. From 2011, he has been director of the International Consortium of Investigative Journalists, which has published research on international tax evasion and money laundering, citing the leaked Panama Papers, Paradise Papers and Pandora Papers.

== Early life ==
Gerard Ryle was born in London to Irish parents. From Tralee, County Kerry in Ireland, he worked for the Irish Press in his early career. His great-grandfather, Maurice P Ryle, was also a journalist : he was the editor of the Kerry People, then worked as editor of the Evening Herald and deputy editor of the Irish Independent.

== Career ==
Ryle emigrated from his native Ireland to Australia in 1988 and has worked for the Fairfax newspapers The Age and the Sydney Morning Herald. In 2007–2009, he exposed the international fraudster Tim Johnston who had deceived the governments of Australia, Britain, Russia and other countries over the Firepower Pill.

In September 2011, he was appointed Director of the International Consortium of Investigative Journalists, a project of the Center for Public Integrity in Washington, D.C., US.

In April 2013, ICIJ published a financial leak, the Offshore leaks, comprising tens of thousands of offshore bank accounts, in which many prominent international figures were implicated, including the ex-wife of Marc Rich, Azerbaijan's ruling family, the daughter of Imelda Marcos, and the late Baron Elie de Rothschild. The leak was the largest ever, at more than 160 times the size in gigabytes of the United States diplomatic cables leak in 2010. "To analyze the documents, ICIJ collaborated with reporters from The Guardian and the BBC in the U.K., Le Monde in France, Süddeutsche Zeitung and Norddeutscher Rundfunk in Germany, The Washington Post, the Canadian Broadcasting Corporation (CBC) and 31 other media partners around the world." The 15-month investigation began when Ryle brought ICIJ a hard drive that he received by mail from an anonymous informant.

== Selected publications ==
- Firepower: The most spectacular fraud in Australian history Allen & Unwin, Sydney 2009. ISBN 978-1-74175-355-4
