= Nuix =

Digital forensics software

Nuix Ltd
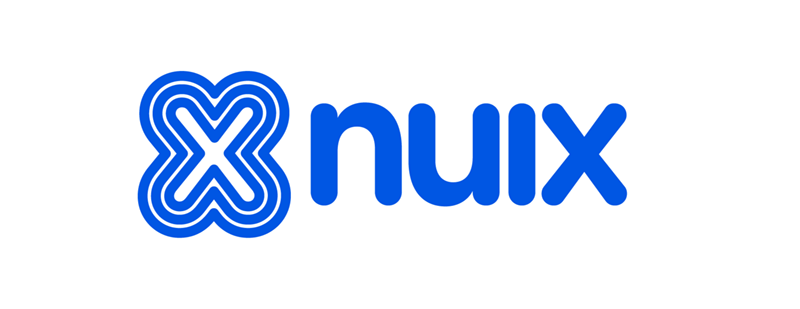
- Type: Public
- Traded as: ASX: NXL
- Industry: Software
- Founded: Sydney, Australia (Incorporated 2005)
- Founder: Tony Castagna David Sitsky
- Headquarters: Sydney, Australia
- Area served: 79 countries
- Key people: John Ruthven
- Number of employees: 420 approximately (2020)
- Website: nuix.com

Nuix Ltd is an Australian technology company that produces investigative analytics and intelligence software for extracting knowledge from unstructured data. The applications of the company's technology reportedly include digital forensics, financial crime, insider investigations, data privacy, data governance, eDiscovery and regulatory compliance. As of December 2020, the company's software was reportedly used by 1000 customers in 79 countries. The company has its headquarters in Sydney, Australia, with offices in Asia, Europe, the Middle East and North America.

== History ==
Nuix was incorporated in 2005 with the goal to make vast quantities of unstructured data easily searchable. From 2006 to 2016, the company grew from just two developers to more than 400 employees.

In 2010 Nuix was awarded a five-year contract by the Securities and Exchange Commission. In 2014 the company was appointed an Industry Partner of the International Multilateral Partnership Against Cyber Threats. In 2017, the Nuix Board of Directors appointed Rod Vawdrey to the position of Chief Executive Officer. In November 2020, the company appointed American lawyer and diplomat Jeffrey Bleich as its chairman. In December 2020, Nuix listed on the Australian Securities Exchange with an initial public offering that valued the company at A$1.8 billion. In October 2021, the Nuix Board appointed Jonathan Rubinsztein to the position of Group Chief Executive Officer.

== Ownership ==
Nuix is a public company listed on the Australian Securities Exchange (ASX: NXL). As of 2020, the largest shareholder was Macquarie Group with a shareholding of approximately 30%.

== Regulatory investigations ==
Following the initial public offering, the Australian Securities and Investments Commission (ASIC) investigated "suspicious revenue forecasts" published in Nuix's prospectus. ASIC concluded its investigation into the forecasts in February 2022 and said it would take no further action. In May 2021, the company reportedly cut ties with former chairman Tony Castagna after it was revealed the Australian Federal Police were investigating alleged breaches of the Corporations Act.

In June 2021, the Australian Federal Police raided the company's office as part of an investigation "into certain individuals" for alleged insider trading. The company later announced it had terminated Stephen Doyle as CFO "by mutual agreement" and CEO Rod Vawdrey had resigned.

== Technology and uses ==
Nuix markets software for eDiscovery, digital forensic investigation, security, intelligence, governance, risk and compliance based on the Nuix Engine. The Nuix Engine combines load balancing, fault tolerance and processing technologies to "provide insights from large volumes of unstructured, semi-structured and structured data". Several features of the Nuix Engine were granted a patent in 2011.

In 2013, Nuix provided a limited number of free software licences to the International Consortium of Investigative Journalists (ICIJ), who used Nuix to investigate the Offshore Leaks data. In 2016, Süddeutsche Zeitung and the ICIJ also used Nuix's software to analyze the "Panama Papers". Using the software, the Panama Papers investigation team made 2.6 terabytes of scanned documents text-searchable and extracted metadata that helped journalists cross-reference people, places and business entities across these documents.

== Awards and recognition ==
- In 2009, Nuix won a NSW Australian Technology Showcase (ATS) export award, and NSW Emerging Exporter Award.
- In 2012, it won the Information and Communication Technology category of the Australian Export Awards.
- In 2015, it won the Premier's NSW Exporter of the Year Award.
- In October 2015, the company reported that it had raised more than $250,000 for Room to Read from its philanthropic product Proof Finder.
- In 2016, Nuix products won Forensic Product of the Year at the Cyber Security Awards, and innovation awards at the Australian Business Awards
- In October 2016, Nuix won the Macquarie Capital Technology Growth Company of the Year at the Australian Growth Company Awards

== See also ==
- Computer forensics
- Open-source intelligence
- Corporate intelligence
- Whistleblower
