= Pandora Papers =

2021 leak of financial documents

Symbol used to represent the leak by the International Consortium of Investigative Journalists

The Pandora Papers are 11.9 million leaked documents with 2.9 terabytes of data that the International Consortium of Investigative Journalists (ICIJ) published beginning on 3 October 2021. The leak exposed the secret offshore accounts of 35 world leaders, including current and former presidents, prime ministers, and heads of state as well as more than 100 business leaders, billionaires, and celebrities. The news organizations of the ICIJ described the document leak as their most expansive exposé of financial secrecy yet, containing documents, images, emails and spreadsheets from 14 financial service companies, in nations including Panama, Switzerland and the United Arab Emirates. The size of the leak surpassed their previous release of the Panama Papers in 2016, which had 11.5 million confidential documents and 2.6 terabytes of data. The ICIJ has not named its source for the documents.

The ICIJ estimates that the total global amount of money held offshore (outside the country where the money was made) is between US$5.6 trillion and US$32 trillion.

== Disclosures ==
In total, 35 current and former national leaders appear in the leak, alongside 400 public officials from nearly 100 countries and more than 100 billionaires. Some of the activities were legal according to the countries' respective tax laws. The majority of the files were dated from 1996 to 2020, with some older documents dating back to 1970. The data included 130 billionaires listed by Forbes, over 330 politicians, celebrities, members of royal families, and religious leaders.

Among those named are former British Prime Minister Tony Blair, Chilean President Sebastián Piñera, former Kenyan President Uhuru Kenyatta, Montenegrin President Milo Đukanović, Ukrainian President Volodymyr Zelenskyy, Qatari Emir Tamim bin Hamad Al Thani, the United Arab Emirates Prime Minister and Dubai ruler Mohammed bin Rashid Al Maktoum, Gabonese President Ali Bongo Ondimba, Lebanese Prime Minister Najib Mikati, Ecuadorian President Guillermo Lasso, family members of former Argentine President Mauricio Macri and his spin-doctor, Ecuadorian Jaime Durán Barba, and Cypriot President Nicos Anastasiades. More than 100 billionaires, 29,000 offshore accounts, 30 current and former leaders, and 336 politicians were named in the first leaks on 3 October 2021.

The papers show that King Abdullah II of Jordan invested over US$100 million in property across the US and UK, including houses in Malibu, California, Washington, D.C., London and Ascot. A UK company controlled by Cherie Blair was shown to have acquired a £6.45 million property in London by purchasing Romanstone International Limited, a British Virgin Islands company; had the property been acquired directly, £312,000 would have been payable in stamp duty. Tony Blair's name appears in a statement of joint income for the associated mortgage.

The papers also reveal how an office block owned by Azerbaijan's ruling Aliyev family was sold to the Crown Estate, the UK sovereign's public estate, for £66 million in 2018, netting the Aliyevs a £31 million profit. Another office block worth £33 million was sold to the Aliyev family in 2009 and was gifted to the 11-year-old son of Azerbaijani president Ilham Aliyev, Heydar. According to the Las Vegas Sun, "Members of the inner circle of Pakistani prime minister Imran Khan are accused of hiding millions of dollars in wealth in secret companies or trusts". Supporters of former Ukrainian president Petro Poroshenko accused his successor Zelenskyy, who came to power on an anti-corruption campaign, of tax evasion. Elsewhere, close associates of Russian president Vladimir Putin, like Svetlana Krivonogikh and Gennady Timchenko, were revealed to have secret assets in Monaco, and Czech prime minister Andrej Babiš, who had campaigned on promises to crack down on corruption and tax evasion, did not declare the use of an offshore investment company in the purchase of eight properties, including two villas, in Mougins on the French Riviera for £12 million. As a result of the Pandora Papers, more information emerged about Russia-linked, allegedly Kremlin-linked, donations to the Tories. Uhuru Kenyatta was also mentioned, despite being quoted in 2018 as stating, "Every public servant's assets must be declared publicly so that people can question and ask – what is legitimate?" Kenyatta and six members of his family have been linked to 13 offshore companies. The leaked list also includes transnational criminal organization leaders, such as Raffaele Amato, boss of the Amato-Pagano clan, a clan within the Camorra, dedicated to international drug trafficking. Amato used a shell company in the UK to buy land and real estate in Spain.

Other global names mentioned include Shakira, who was incorporating new offshore entities while going on trial for tax evasion; model Claudia Schiffer; Indian cricket player Sachin Tendulkar; Indian billionaire Anil Ambani; fugitive diamantaire Nirav Modi's sister Purvi Modi; Alexandre Cazes, the founder of the dark web site AlphaBay, used to deal in illegal drugs; Pakistani finance minister, Shaukat Fayaz Ahmed Tarin, and several of family members of Pakistan's top generals; and the CEO of Channel One Russia, Konstantin Ernst. Miguel Bosé, Pep Guardiola and Julio Iglesias are also named.

== Data sources ==
The leaked files come from 14 offshore service providers that help clients establish companies in secrecy jurisdictions.

Offshore service provider sources
Provider	Records	Time period	Founding office location	Year founded
All About Offshore Limited	270,328	2002–2019	Seychelles	2007
Alemán, Cordero, Galindo & Lee	2,185,783	1970–2019	Panama	1985
Alpha Consulting Limited	823,305	1996–2020	Seychelles	2008
Asiaciti Trust Asia Limited	1,800,650	1996–2019	Hong Kong	1978
CCS Trust Limited	149,378	2001–2017	Belize	2005
CIL Trust International	459,476	1996–2019	Belize	1994
Commence Overseas Limited	8,661	2004–2017	British Virgin Islands	1992
Demetrios A. Demetriades LLC	469,184	1993–2021	Cyprus	1966
Fidelity Corporate Services Limited	213,733	1998–2019	British Virgin Islands	2005
Glenn D. Godfrey and Company LLP	189,907	1980–2019	Belize	2003
Il Shin	1,575,840	1996–2020	Hong Kong	2004
Overseas Management Company Inc	190,477	1997–2020	Panama	1961
SFM Corporate Services	191,623	2000–2019	Switzerland United Arab Emirates	2006
Trident Trust Company Limited	3,375,331	1970–2019	British Virgin Islands	1986

=== Alcogal law firm ===
An ICIJ report focused on the Panamanian law firm of Alemán, Cordero, Galindo & Lee, or Alcogal, saying it was the "law firm of the Latin American elite", having created at least 14,000 shell companies and trusts in tax havens. Alcogal was thus mentioned more than any other offshore provider in the leaked documents.

== Participating media outlets ==
For the uncovering of the papers, the ICIJ worked with journalists from 91 media outlets in 117 countries including news organizations such as The Washington Post, L'Espresso, Le Monde, El País, Süddeutsche Zeitung, the PBS program Frontline, the Australian Broadcasting Corporation, The Guardian, and the BBC's Panorama.

The following media organisations worked on the investigation:

- Balkan Investigative Reporting Network
- Twala
- La Nación
- elDiarioAR
- Infobae
- Hetq
- Australian Broadcasting Corporation
- Australian Financial Review
- Austrian Broadcasting Corporation
- Profil
- Belsat
- De Tijd
- Knack
- Le Soir
- Organized Crime and Corruption Reporting Project
- Ink Center for Investigative Journalism
- Agência Pública
- Metrópoles
- Poder 360
- Revista Piauí
- Bureau for Investigative Reporting and Data
- L'Economiste Du Faso
- VOD
- The Museba Project
- CBC/Radio-Canada
- Toronto Star
- Ciper Chile
- Fundación Periodística LaBot
- CONNECTAS
- El Espectador
- National Magazine Comores
- Centro Latinoamericano de Investigación Periodística
- Costa Rica Noticias, Canal 13
- Eburnie Today
- L'Elephant Dechaine
- Proyecto Inventario
- Czech Center for Investigative Journalism
- Berlingske
- Danish Broadcasting Corporation
- Politiken
- Noticias SIN
- Diario El Universo
- Mada Masr
- El Faro
- Diario Rombe
- Eesti Päevaleht
- Yle – Finnish Broadcasting Company
- Le Monde
- Premières Lignes
- Radio France
- iFact
- Deutsche Welle
- Norddeutscher Rundfunk
- Süddeutsche Zeitung
- Westdeutscher Rundfunk
- Ghana Business News
- Zami Reports
- Plaza Pública
- Contracorriente
- Stand News
- Direkt36
- Reykjavík Media
- Stundin
- The Indian Express
- Tempo
- Shomrim
- L'Espresso
- The Asahi Shimbun
- Kyodo News
- Arab Reporters for Investigative Journalism
- Africa Uncensored
- The Elephant
- Re:Baltica
- Daraj Media
- Daily Observer Newspaper
- FrontPage Africa
- Africa Report
- Siena.lt
- Reporter.lu
- Nation Publications LTD
- Platform for Investigative Journalism
- Malaysiakini
- Malian Network of Investigative Journalists
- Times of Malta
- L'Express
- Proceso
- Quinto Elemento Lab
- MANS
- Le Desk
- The Namibian
- Centre for Investigative Journalism, Nepal
- Kantipur Daily
- Het Financieele Dagblad
- Investico
- Trouw
- New Zealand Media and Entertainment
- TVNZ
- Confidencial
- L'Evenement
- Premium Times
- Aftenposten
- E24
- The News
- Grupo ABC Color
- Convoca
- IDL-Reporteros
- Philippine Center for Investigative Journalism
- Rappler
- Gazeta Wyborcza
- Expresso
- Centro De Periodismo Investigativo
- RISE
- Important Stories
- Impact.sn
- KRIK
- OŠTRO
- amaBhungane Centre for Investigative Journalism
- Carte Blanche (M-Net)
- Newstapa
- El País
- LaSexta
- Spotify
- SVT
- TAMEDIA
- Jamii Media
- Isra News Agency
- De Cive (Le Citoyen) et La Lettre Agricole
- Flambeau des Democrates
- L'Union pour la Patrie
- Quoditien Liberte
- Inkyfada
- NMG Uganda
- Slidstvo.Info
- BBC
- Finance Uncovered
- Private Eye
- The Guardian
- El Nuevo Herald
- Frontline (PBS)
- McClatchy
- Miami Herald
- The Washington Post
- Univision
- Semanario Búsqueda
- Armando.Info
- Makanday Center for Investigative Journalism

== Reactions ==
=== Africa ===
- Ivory Coast: Prime Minister Patrick Achi's office condemned the "malicious use" of information.
- Kenya: President Uhuru Kenyatta said the Pandora Papers would be good for transparency, and said he would respond fully when he returned from a trip abroad. He had previously demanded that all civil servants account for their wealth.

=== Asia ===
- Sri Lanka: President Gotabaya Rajapaksa has ordered the Bribery Commission to probe into Sri Lankans named in the Pandora Papers, which exposed financial fraud globally.
- Jordan: The Jordanian government called claims made about King Abdullah II in the leak "distorted", while the King himself denounced what he claimed was a "campaign against Jordan".
- India: The Indian Ministry of Finance promised an investigation into the revelations in the leak, and that appropriate legal action would be taken if necessary.
- Hong Kong: Chief Executive Carrie Lam refused to comment on the report and whether the current government would follow up on the incident, saying only that the Hong Kong government has a "very robust" declaration of interests system. Leung Chun-ying, the former chief executive named in the document, pointed out that the relevant reports were misleading, claiming that only directly held shares need to be declared, and indirectly held and traded shares do not need to be declared, and he countered that the position of participating in the investigation was a "foreign agent".
- Indonesia: Coordinating Minister for the Economy Airlangga Hartarto and Coordinating Minister for Maritime Affairs and Investment Luhut Binsar Pandjaitan are named on the leak. Airlangga denied any knowledge of the transactions by the corporation he owned in the British Virgin Islands. Luhut denied partnership with an Indonesian state-owned oil firm and then changed the company's name.
- Lebanon: Lebanese Prime Minister Najib Mikati and former Prime Minister Hassan Diab denied any wrongdoing.
- Pakistan: Prime Minister Imran Khan said that all citizens mentioned in the Pandora Papers would be investigated and appropriate action taken in case of wrongdoing. Ahsan Iqbal, secretary general of the Pakistan Muslim League (N), called for the resignation of Prime Minister Khan.
- Malaysia: Prime Minister Anwar Ibrahim called for the content of the Pandora Papers to be discussed in Parliament after it was revealed several officials, including former finance minister Tengku Zafrul Aziz, as well as former finance minister Daim Zainuddin were named in the leaks. Subsequently in Parliament, Minister in the Prime Minister's Department (Parliament and Law) Wan Junaidi Tuanku Jaafar said that the Government will instruct its agencies to look into claims related to the Papers. In addition, former Finance Minister Daim Zainuddin maintained his business dealings were legitimate.
- Singapore: The Monetary Authority of Singapore (MAS) will examine information relating to one of the companies named in the report, a Singapore-based firm called Asiaciti Trust. The firm added that the reports were "based on incomplete and sometimes erroneous information", including some illegally obtained. Subsequently in Parliament, Minister for Finance Lawrence Wong said that no significant concerns about financial institutions in Singapore were raised by the leaks, although the MAS will engage institutions to see if there is a need to tighten controls. The two companies named in the report, including Trident Trust Company Singapore, are licensed and regulated.

=== Europe ===
- United Kingdom: Former prime minister Tony Blair and his wife denied any wrongdoing, with the couple's spokesperson saying "the Blairs pay full tax on all their earnings. And have never used offshore schemes either to hide transactions or avoid tax."
- European Union: EU tax commissioner Paolo Gentiloni told the European Parliament that the European Commission will present new legislative proposals to tackle tax avoidance and tax evasion by the end of the year.
- Czech Republic: The Czech National Police promised an investigation into any citizens mentioned in the Pandora Papers, including ex-Prime Minister Andrej Babiš. Babiš denied any wrongdoing, and alleged that the timing and/or content of the leak was aimed at influencing the upcoming legislative election.
- Ireland: Tánaiste Leo Varadkar stated that the Irish government and legislature would move immediately to close any loopholes in tax or company law that allow individuals and businesses to use the country as an offshore location.
- Russia: President Putin's spokesman Dmitry Peskov dismissed the accusations against Putin, who is not directly named in the Pandora Papers, as "unsubstantiated claims" after several individuals linked to Putin were mentioned in the leak. Russian Foreign Ministry spokeswoman Maria Zakharova said that the United States was "the largest" tax haven and "billions of dollars in South Dakota belong to those accused of financial crimes."
- Ukraine: President Volodymyr Zelenskyy's office denied any wrongdoing after he was named in the leak. Ex-journalist and Volodymyr Zelenskyy's associate Serhiy Leshchenko said "there is no subject for a scandal" and "in Ukraine, offshore companies are so widespread that the owners of stalls already have an offshore company".

=== North America ===
- Mexico: President Andrés Manuel López Obrador stated that he would push for an investigation into any Mexican nationals named in the leak.
- United States: The United States Department of State announced in 2021 that it would review the documents published in the Pandora Papers. According to the leak, trusts in several U.S. states — including South Dakota, Florida, Delaware, Texas, and Nevada — were sheltering at least US$1 billion for offshore clients. In 2024, the IRS was granted permission to serve a John Doe summons to Trident Trust Group in order to collect information about any clients who may have used their services for the purpose of tax evasion.

=== Central America and Caribbean ===
- Dominican Republic: President Luis Abinader denied any wrongdoing after being named in the leak, adding that he "has been completely separated from the administration and management of all the companies controlled by the family, incorporated in the Dominican Republic or abroad" since he assumed power in August 2020.
- Panama: The Procuraduría General de la Nación (PGN), a government agency, was reported to be analyzing the contents of the leak, seeking foundations for a criminal investigation of those mentioned in the leak. The Colegio Nacional de Abogados (CNA), a local trade association, stated that Panamanian law firms had offered their services lawfully, the leak does not reflect reality, threatens the rule according to higher law, law firms and their customers around the world enjoy confidentiality which may only be breached by a court order, and the leak poses a threat to Panamanian law firms as it presents them as allies of criminals.
  - Alcogal, one of the largest sources of leaked documents, stated that many people named in the leak had never been its clients, the ICIJ had divulged inexact and outdated information and a wrong image of their law firm, already decided who was guilty, and Alcogal considers themselves part of the solution and are not infallible. The Panamanian government sent the ICIJ a letter through law firm Benesch, Friedlander, Coplan & Aronoff LLP, stating whatever image the ICIJ had of Panama in 2016 is out of date, and the Panamanian government is willing to start a dialogue to avoid further great damage to Panama, as happened during the Panama Papers. The government argued that the name "Panama" became linked to offshore companies and money laundering due to efforts from the ICIJ, despite not being the main tax haven or destination for tax structuring contrary to what the Tax Justice Network said, the ICIJ's use of "Panama Papers" caused global media to associate Panama with tax havens, and listed measures the government had taken after the Panama Papers. They also announced the suspension of 50% of all companies registered in Panama, stating the aim to curb sensationalist coverage and counteract any negative consequences resulting from scandals where the country may be involved by others. The ICIJ was told to be cautious and avoid references to Panama without "informative justification". The government will supervise all subjects registered in Panama mentioned in the leak to protect the country's image and reputation through the newly created Superintendencia de Sujetos no Financieros, and the DGI will begin taxing procedures to all natural and juridical persons in the leak and is willing to exchange information with other jurisdictions. Alcogal, the Panamanian law firm protagonist of Pandora's papers, announced that it has created a transparency department in order to reinforce its obligations in the matter and its commitment to a regulation recently approved by the National Government.

=== South America ===
- Chile: President Sebastián Piñera denied having hidden assets in tax havens.
- Ecuador: President Guillermo Lasso denied any wrongdoing. He said that he voluntarily cooperated with the Pandora Papers investigation, and that regarding his naming in the leak, "most of the societies mentioned were legally dissolved in the past, and I have no link with those that may still exist".
- Uruguay: The National Secretariat for the Fight against Money Laundering and Terrorism Financing of the Presidential Office of Uruguay started ex officio to research the case to find out about the roles of law firms based in Montevideo aimed to provide offshore entities to clients worldwide as intermediaries of Alcogal.

== See also ==
- List of people named in the Pandora Papers
- Azerbaijani Laundromat
- Bahamas Leaks
- Banca Privada d'Andorra
- Cyprus Papers
- Dubai Uncovered
- FinCEN Files
- The Laundromat (2019 film)
- LuxLeaks
- Mauritius Leaks
- Offshore Leaks
- Paradise Papers
- Russian Laundromat
- Suisse secrets
- Swiss Leaks
