= Nigel Cowie =

British banker

- Education: University of Edinburgh
- Occupations: CEO, Daedong Credit Bank
- Known for: co-founder, DCB Finance

Nigel Cowie is a British banker, who lived in North Korea for two decades from 1995.

== Early life ==
He was educated at the University of Edinburgh.

== Career ==
He worked for Hongkong and Shanghai Banking Corporation before moving to North Korea.

North Korean official, Kim Chol-sam and Cowie created a shell company called "DCB Finance" to circumvent sanctions, help sell arms, and expand its nuclear weapons programme.

Cowie was also CEO of Daedong Credit Bank, which was placed under sanctions.

Cowie is a director of Phoenix Commercial Ventures Limited, a North Korean project finance company.
