= Kim Chol-sam =

North Korean banker

Kim Chol-sam (born 11 March 1971) is a North Korean banker, the treasurer of Daedong Credit Bank (DCB).

Kim Chol-Sam and British banker Nigel Cowie created a shell company called "DCB Finance" to circumvent sanctions, help sell arms, and expand its nuclear weapons programme.

Daedong Credit Bank, has been placed under US sanctions.

Kim has been named in the Panama Papers.

== See also ==
- North Korea's illicit activities
