= Diario Rombe =

Digital newspaper

- Type: Digital newspaper
- Founder(s): Mocache Massoko
- Founded: 2012
- Website: https://diariorombe.es/

Diario Rombe is a digital newspaper outlet from Equatorial Guinea established in 2012 by Mocache Massoko. Based in Spain, it is considered as the most reliable media opposing the government of Teodoro Obiang.

Alongside Facebook, Twitter, and the opposition media Radio Macuto, Diario Rombe was blocked in the country during the 2015 student protests in Equatorial Guinea. It was also one of the media uncovering the Pandora Papers in 2021.
