= Kevin Leech =

British entrepreneur (born 1943)

Kevin Ronald Leech (born August 1943) is a British entrepreneur, involved with Land's End and the Snowdon Mountain Railway.
