= FinCEN Files =

2020 leak of 2,657 financial documents showing suspicious activities

The FinCEN Files are documents from the U.S. Treasury's Financial Crimes Enforcement Network (FinCEN), that were leaked to BuzzFeed News and then shared with the International Consortium of Investigative Journalists (ICIJ), and published globally on 20 September 2020. The 2,657 leaked documents include 2,121 suspicious activity reports (SARs) covering over 200,000 suspicious financial transactions between 1999 and 2017 valued at over US$2 trillion by multiple global financial institutions.

The BuzzFeed News report concludes that the documents appear to show that both the banks that filed the SARs and FinCEN had this financial intelligence but did little to stop activities such as money laundering. The SARs were generated by financial institutions in more than 170 countries that played a role in facilitating money laundering and other financial crimes. Journalists around the world have criticized both the banks and the US government. The BBC stated it shows how the "world's biggest banks have allowed criminals to move dirty money around the world". BuzzFeed News claimed the files "offer an unprecedented view of global financial corruption, the banks enabling it, and the government agencies that watch as it flourishes."

== Background ==
Financial Crimes Enforcement Network (FinCEN) is a bureau of the United States Department of the Treasury that collects and analyses financial information to combat money laundering, terrorism financing, evasion of economic sanctions and other financial crimes. Financial institutions are required to file suspicious activity reports (SARs) with FinCEN when they suspect their clients are engaging in financial crime. These SARs are not evidence of a crime, but the FinCEN claims they provide vital information to investigate crimes. Unauthorized disclosure of a SAR is a US federal criminal offense, as it could undermine or hamper ongoing investigations, and threaten the safety of financial institutions and those who file the SARs. FinCEN collected more than 2 million SARs in 2020, while its staff has decreased by 10% from 2009 to 2019. BuzzFeed News sources also claim that most SARs are not read or acted upon. The BuzzFeed News report claims that besides filing a SAR when they suspect suspicious activity, banks are also required to take action themselves to deal with corruption or money laundering.

== Investigative journalism ==
BuzzFeed News obtained the 2,657 leaked documents, including 2,121 SARs, in 2019 and shared them with the ICIJ. 400 journalists from 88 countries investigated the documents which were brought to the public's attention on 20 September 2020. BuzzFeed News and the ICIJ state that the files flag over 200,000 transactions dating from 1999 to 2017, worth a total of US$2 trillion. Furthermore, they noted that the findings may not be representative of all SARs, as the files received are less than 0.02% of the more than 12 million SARs that financial institutions filed with FinCEN during this period. The Miami Herald said that the files "are the most detailed U.S. Treasury records ever leaked."

BuzzFeed News reported that records had been gathered both during the U.S. Congress investigations into Russian interference in the 2016 United States elections and through requests from law enforcement agencies.

== Findings ==
BuzzFeed News has named "JPMorgan Chase, HSBC, Standard Chartered, Deutsche Bank, and Bank of New York Mellon" as involved in money laundering. BuzzFeed News also criticizes the United States government for not forcing the banks to stop this activity. BuzzFeed and the International Consortium of Investigative Journalists have also reported that American Express, Bank of America, Bank of China, Barclays, China Investment Corporation, Citibank, Commerzbank, Danske Bank, First Republic Bank, Société Générale, VEB.RF and Wells Fargo are involved in the SARs. The ICIJ noted that 62% of the leaked filings involved Deutsche Bank, with at least 20% involving addresses in the British Virgin Islands.

Prominent individuals highlighted in the leaks include former Donald Trump campaign manager Paul Manafort, Iranian-Turkish gold trader Reza Zarrab, Malaysian businessman Jho Low, and alleged Russian organised crime boss Semion Mogilevich.

Other reporting on national connections to the FinCEN Files includes the Canadian Broadcasting Corporation's reporting on HSBC and coverage by the Australian Broadcasting Corporation.

=== Africa ===
It was reported that Angolan businesswoman Isabel dos Santos was flagged for money laundering in 2013.

=== Asia and Oceania ===
It was reported that US$167 million of possibly dirty money flowed through two Australian banks: Macquarie Group (US$123 million) and Commonwealth Bank (US$44 million).

The Indian Express reported that Jindal Steel and Power was flagged by Deutsche Bank for money laundering.

The SARs, with additional investigations by the Organized Crime and Corruption Reporting Project, also provide further details on the scheme employed by Reza Zarrab to evade economic sanctions on Iran, and its links with the Magnitsky tax fraud and other Russian money laundering schemes.

In Macau, the Macau News Agency (MNA) reported that 62 transactions involving more than US$68.2 million that flowed to or from four banks in Macau between 2000 and 2017 were flagged as potentially suspicious money-laundering transactions. The banks included the Bank of China, Banco Nacional Ultramarino, Industrial and Commercial Bank of China (Macau), and HSBC Macau. All these transactions were processed through three American-based financial institutions, that filed SARs with FinCEN by the China Investment Corporation, The Bank of New York Mellon and Standard Chartered.

In Malaysia, the Malay Mail reported that several international banks had been flagged in numerous suspicious transactions involving fugitive Malaysian businessman Low Taek Jho, involving 103 transactions worth US$2.53 billion. The banks involved included Citibank, Deutsche Bank, HSBC, JPMorgan Chase, and the Bank of New York Mellon. Jho allegedly played a role in being the main person in the laundering of proceeds from the government unit 1Malaysia Development Berhad (1MDB).

Also reported by the Malay Mail, that several leading Malaysian banks and international banks with their Malaysian subsidiaries had been flagged by FinCEN in 23 suspicious transactions with over US$4.88 million entering and US$13.38 million leaving the country. The banks included Public Bank Berhad, AmBank, HSBC Bank Malaysia, Alliance Bank Malaysia Berhad, United Overseas Bank, CIMB Bank, and Standard Chartered. The flagged transactions going in and out of these Malaysian banks involved overseas accounts in countries including Afghanistan, Latvia, Poland, the United Arab Emirates (UAE) and the United States.

In the Philippines, the Philippine Center for Investigative Journalism (PCIJ) reported that the files show that two Philippine remittance agents Philrem Service Corp. (Philrem) and Werquick Inc. sent more than $1 billion of what were deemed suspicious wires from 2012 to 2016, that were coursed through their foreign currency accounts held at Philippine banks Banco de Oro (BDO), Metrobank and Rizal Commercial Banking Corporation (RCBC). Philrem and RCBC were involved in the illicit transfer of stolen funds from the Bangladesh Bank in 2016.

It was also reported that overseas proceeds from a sextortion scheme that were sent by wire transfer into U.S. banks amounting to more than $400,000 into the accounts of a certain Philippine criminal syndicate led by Charvel Yap Rebagay. His company, Digital Minds and its call centers offices across the Philippines were raided by the Philippine National Police and Interpol in 2014 for sextortion activities. Rebagay is still a wanted fugitive.

In Japan, the files also revealed a consulting firm for the Tokyo Olympic 2020 bid committee paid $370,000 to Papa Massata Diack, son of former International Association of Athletics Federations (IAAF) President and International Olympic Committee (IOC) Lamine Diack that were coursed through Black Tidings, a consulting firm based in Singapore, received a total of $2 million from the bid committee paid into a bank account in the city-state in July and October 2013 and later transferred to Diack's Citibank account. Diack was jailed for corruption and breach of trust by a Paris district court earlier in 2020.

It was reported that the Turkish bank Aktif Bank was a financial facilitator for Wirecard and was alleged to have laundered money for the Taliban.

The Central Bank of the UAE failed to act on SARs related to evading sanctions in Iran.

=== Europe ===
The files showed new details related to the Danske Bank money laundering scandal.

ICIJ and Deutsche Welle report that Germany's Deutsche Bank accounted for 62% of the leaked SARs. Deutsche Welle further notes that Deutsche Bank was responsible for $1.3 trillion worth of suspicious transactions, even after hundreds of millions in fines for violating US sanctions. BuzzFeed News also reported that the files revealed Deutsche Bank was a major source of money laundering for organised crime, terrorists and drug traffickers.

In Ireland, The Irish Times reported on a Dublin business called International Overseas Services Group (IOS), an international company services operation, whose office in Riga, Latvia, helped clients from Russia and the former Soviet Union establish secret accounts with Estonian and Latvian banks, with United Kingdom LLP shell companies formed back in the 1990s. The FinCEN documents show that 646 of 2,100 Scottish and English company SARs are linked to this Irish company, the largest number of any such entity. As for his relationship with money laundering, the company founder likens himself to the innocent seller of a criminal getaway car.

The files revealed that US banks have notified their authorities of around $160 million that has gone through the partly state-owned DNB group. The transactions via DNB took place mainly from 2015 to 2017. Some transfers date back to 2008.

A report by the BBC suggests that the FinCen Files reveal that the United Kingdom bank HSBC was involved in numerous illegal money transfers. At the time, HSBC was subject to a deferred prosecution agreement for the laundering of $881 million on behalf of the Sinaloa and Norte del Valle cartels. The files also describe how Barclays Bank laundered money on behalf of Arkady Rotenberg, a close associate of Vladimir Putin, who is under sanctions for his involvement in the Russo-Ukrainian War. The BBC further notes that the UK is judged a "higher risk jurisdiction" due to the number of the country's companies appearing in SARs.

The Times of Malta reported that €647m worth of transfers by Afren into Electrogas were flagged as suspicious.

=== North and South America ===
It was reported that the Argentinian company Vicentin was flagged for money laundering.

Javier Mascherano was reportedly flagged for money laundering for more than $1 million in transactions by his British Virgin Islands-registered company, Alenda Investments Ltd.

The FinCEN Files implicate former Mexican president Enrique Peña Nieto in money laundering. The files revealed that Group Grand Limited was controlled by Alex Saab and Álvaro Pulido.

NBC News reported that North Korea laundered money through US banks via shell companies and Chinese firms.

== Responses ==
BuzzFeed News contacted the named banks for responses to the allegations. American Express and Bank of China did not respond; Bank of America and First Republic Bank declined to comment. Even as the worldwide group of journalists was preparing their reporting of the FinCEN Files, FinCEN announced on 16 September 2020 that they would be overhauling their money laundering programs.

Deutsche Bank commented on the FinCEN investigation, explaining that the transactions in the FinCEN file leaks were prior to 2016, and "acknowledged past weaknesses in our control environment... we learnt from our mistakes, systematically tackled the issues and made changes to our business perimeter, our controls, and our personnel." They invested "$1 billion in improved controls, trainings and operational processes, and have increased our anti-financial crime team to over 1,500 people." and make the claim that they "are a different bank now." They followed their response up with an additional statement, restating their commitment to ensuring fraud does not occur and saying "To the extent that information referenced by the ICIJ is derived from SARs, this is information that is pro-actively identified and submitted by banks to governments pursuant to the law. SARs are alerts of potential issues, not proven facts."

Standard Chartered responded to these accusations, claiming "we take our responsibility to fight financial crime extremely seriously." They state that they meet their obligations to law enforcement, and say that "the responsibility of banks is to build effective screening and monitoring systems and we work closely with regulators and law enforcement to bring perpetrators to justice."

Valdis Dombrovskis stated to the ICIJ that "[d]uring my time as prime minister of Latvia between 2008 and 2014, in the midst of an unprecedented economic crisis, my governments oversaw important reforms ... to tackle money laundering and close loopholes...Progress made was acknowledged by [European Union] institutions at the time."

FinCEN condemned the leak, saying that it could affect US national security and compromise the safety of those filing FinCEN reports.

Senators Elizabeth Warren and Bernie Sanders both called for reform. Senator Warren pushed for punishments when banks are caught breaking the law and called for the passage of her "Ending Too Big to Jail Act" bill. Bernie Sanders stated that the laundering practices were "just some of the routine business practices on Wall Street" and that the "business model of Wall Street is fraud." Linda A. Lacewell the superintendent of the New York State Department of Financial Services, said in an opinion piece that "Individual bankers are rarely held accountable, so money laundering becomes a source of profits and bank fines become a cost of doing business, when the profits exceed the fines, the business choice is easily corrupted."

On 9 October 2020, the European Parliament held a hearing over the issues raised by the leak.

== Impact ==
On 21 September 2020, numerous bank stocks plunged as a result of the leaks. HSBC shares dropped to the lowest levels in 25 years.

In June 2021 an employee of the Financial Crimes Enforcement Network named Natalie Mayflower Sours Edwards admitted to leaking the SARs to BuzzFeed News, which was subsequently acknowledged by Buzzfeed News. She was sentenced to six months in federal prison for leaking other SAR's documents, but maintained she did so as a whistle-blower to highlight alleged corruption in the government.

The series was named a finalist for the Pulitzer Prize in the international category in 2021.

== See also ==
- Danskebank money laundering scandal
- HSBC § Money laundering
- LuxLeaks
- Panama Papers
- Pandora Papers
- Paradise Papers
- Swiss Leaks
- Suisse secrets
