= Bahamas Leaks =

The Bahama Leaks are 1.3 million internal files from the company register of the Bahamas. After the release of the Panama Papers in 2016, an unknown source handed over internal data from the national corporate registry of the Bahamas to Frederik Obermaier and Bastian Obermayer, who analyzed them with the help of the International Consortium of Investigative Journalists (ICIJ). At the same time, ICIJ, Süddeutsche Zeitung, and other media partners published detailed reports before publishing an online database of offshore entities.

The files provided data on 175,888 shell companies and trusts established in the Bahamas between 1990 and 2016. The 38 gigabytes of data showed that "several current and former heads of state and government and high-ranking politicians, including former EU Commissioner Neelie Kroes; Colombia’s former mining minister Carlos Caballero Argáez; Hamad bin Jassim bin Jaber Al Thani, the former prime minister of Qatar; and Angola’s vice-president, Manuel Domingos Vicente respectively are directors, secretaries, or presidents of Bahamian companies".

The files were later published as part of a larger set by Distributed Denial of Secrets. The Bahamas Attorney General accused the group of hacking their corporate registry, though the group, the ICIJ, and Frederik Obermaier disputed this.

== Offshore leaks database ==
Combined with documents from the Panama Papers and other leaked offshore documents, a free, online, and publicly-searchable database of offshore companies was made available to the public for the first time. The Offshore Leaks Database contains information about 500,000 entities linked to 200 countries and territories.

== See also ==
- Distributed Denial of Secrets
- International Consortium of Investigative Journalists
- Offshore Leaks
- Panama Papers
- Paradise Papers
