= Daedong Credit Bank =

Bank of North Korea

Coordinates: 39°01′12″N 125°43′03″E

- Native name: 대동신용은행
- Industry: Bank
- Founded: 1995; 31 years ago
- Headquarters: Pyongyang, North Korea
- Website: www.daedongcreditbank.com

Daedong Credit Bank (DCB; Korean: 대동신용은행) is a North Korean bank, established in 1995, and based in the country's capital, Pyongyang.

DCB has been on the US Treasury sanctions list since June 2013, for "its role in supporting Pyongyang's weapons of mass destruction program". Also sanctioned were DCB Financial Limited, and its representative, Kim Chol-sam, and Son Mun San, the external affairs bureau chief of North Korea's Bureau of Atomic Energy.

== See also ==
- North Korea's illicit activities
