= International Consortium of Investigative Journalists =

International network of investigative reporters

- Abbreviation: ICIJ
- Formation: 1997; 29 years ago
- Type: 501(c)(3) organization
- Tax ID no.: 81-4739107
- Location: Washington, D.C.
- Director: Gerard Ryle
- Board of directors: Rhona Murphy (chair), Alexander Papachristou, Alejandra Xanic von Bertrab Wilhelm, Tom Steinberg, Dapo Olorunyomi, Birgit Rieck, Tony Norman
- Revenue: $3,022,355 (2020)
- Website: www.icij.org

The International Consortium of Investigative Journalists (ICIJ), is an independent global network of 280 investigative journalists and over 140 media organizations spanning more than 100 countries. It is based in Washington, D.C., with personnel in Australia, France, Spain, Hungary, Serbia, Belgium and Ireland.

The ICIJ was launched in 1997 by American journalist Charles Lewis as an initiative of the Center for Public Integrity, with the aim of exposing international crime and corruption. In 2017, it became a fully independent organization and was later granted 501(c)(3) nonprofit status.

The Panama Papers were the result of a collaboration with the German newspaper Süddeutsche Zeitung and more than 100 other media partners, with journalists spending a year sifting through 11.5 million leaked files from the Panama-based law firm Mossack Fonseca. It culminated in a partial release on 3 April 2016, garnering global media attention. The set of confidential financial and legal documents included detailed information on more than 14,000 clients and more than 214,000 offshore entities, revealing the identities of shareholders and directors including noted personalities and heads of state—government officials, close relatives and associates of various heads of government of more than 40 other countries. Süddeutsche Zeitung first received the released data from an anonymous source in 2015. After working on the Mossack Fonseca documents for a year, ICIJ director Gerard Ryle described how the offshore firm had "helped companies and individuals with tax havens, including those that have been sanctioned by the U.S. and UK for dealing with Syrian President Bashar al-Assad."

The ICIJ helped bring about the Corporate Transparency Act in the United States. The Enablers Act, included in the annual defense bill, was first proposed shortly after the ICIJ's Pandora Papers investigation exposed widespread exploitation of lax financial disclosure rules in the U.S.

Governments have recovered more than US$1.36 billion in taxes as a result of the Panama Papers project alone, and some continue to collect lost tax revenue.

== History ==
In 1997, the Center for Public Integrity created the International Consortium of Investigative Journalists. By 2000, the ICIJ consisted of 75 investigative reporters in 39 countries.

In early November 2014, the ICIJ's Luxembourg Leaks investigation revealed that Luxembourg under Jean-Claude Juncker's premiership had turned into a major European centre of corporate tax avoidance.

In February 2015, the ICIJ website released information about bank accounts in Switzerland under the title Swiss Leaks: Murky Cash Sheltered by Bank Secrecy, which published information on 100,000 clients and their accounts at HSBC.

In February 2017, ICIJ was spun off into a fully independent organisation, which is governed by three committees: a board of directors, an Advisory Committee, and the ICIJ Network Committee.

ICIJ was granted nonprofit status from US tax authorities in July 2017.

In 2017, the ICIJ, the McClatchy Company, and the Miami Herald won the Pulitzer Prize for Explanatory Reporting for the Panama Papers. In total, the ICIJ won more than 20 awards for the Panama Papers.

== Selected reports ==
=== Global tobacco industry ===
From 2008 to 2011, the ICIJ investigated the global tobacco industry, revealing how Philip Morris International and other tobacco companies worked to grow businesses in Russia, Mexico, Uruguay and Indonesia.

=== Offshore banking series ===
The ICIJ partnered with The Guardian, BBC, Le Monde, the Washington Post, SonntagsZeitung, The Indian Express, Süddeutsche Zeitung and NDR to produce an investigative series on offshore banking. They reported on government corruption across the globe, tax avoidance schemes used by wealthy people and the use of secret offshore accounts in Ponzi Schemes.

In June 2011, an ICIJ article revealed how an Australian businessman had helped his clients legally incorporate thousands of offshore shell entitles "some of which later became involved in the international movement of oil, guns and money."

In April 2013, a report (Offshore Leaks) disclosing details of 130,000 offshore accounts, some of which conducted international tax fraud.

In early 2014, the ICIJ revealed that relatives of China's political and financial elite were among those using offshore tax havens to conceal wealth. In July 2019, the Mauritius Leaks showed how Mauritius was being used as one such tax haven. In 2022, ICIJ partnered with the Washington Post to investigate the role of registered agents in Wyoming such as Registered Agents Inc. to enable scams and financial crimes.

==== Panama Papers ====
Countries with politicians, public officials or close associates named in the leak on 15 April 2016

In 2016, the Süddeutsche Zeitung received a leaked set of 11.5 million confidential documents from a secret source, created by the Panamanian corporate service provider Mossack Fonseca. The so-called Panama Papers provided detailed information on more than 214,000 offshore companies, including the identities of shareholders and directors which included government officials, close relatives and close associates of various heads of government of more than 40 countries. Because of the leak the prime minister of Iceland, Sigmundur David Gunnlaugsson, was forced to resign on 5 April 2016. By 4 April 2016 more than 100 media organisations had participated in analyzing the documents, including BBC Panorama, and the UK newspaper, The Guardian. Based on the Panama Paper disclosure, Pakistan Supreme Court constituted the Joint Investigation Team to probe the matter and disqualified the Prime Minister Nawas Sharif on 28 July 2017 to hold any public office for life.

The ICIJ and Süddeutsche Zeitung received the Panama Papers in 2015 and distributed them to about 400 journalists at 107 media organizations in more than 80 countries.

According to The New York Times,

[T]he Panama Papers reveal an industry that flourishes in the gaps and holes of international finance. They make clear that policing offshore banking and tax havens and the rogues who use them cannot be done by any one country alone. Lost tax revenue is one consequence of this hidden system; even more dangerous is its deep damage to democratic rule and regional stability when corrupt politicians have a place to stash stolen national assets out of public view.

==== Paradise Papers ====
Countries with politicians, public officials or close associates named in the leak on 5 November 2017

In 2017, the German newspaper Süddeutsche Zeitung obtained millions of leaked files known as the Paradise Papers, regarding tax havens, related to the Bermuda-based offshore specialist Appleby. The files were shared the ICIJ and later the media. They revealed that many of the tax havens used by Appleby are in the Cayman Islands.

=== Implant Files ===
In November 2018, the ICIJ published the Implant Files, the first global investigation into the medical device industry that tracked the harm caused by medical devices that have been tested inadequately or not at all. It took a year to plan and another year to complete.

ICIJ partnered with 252 journalists from 59 media organisations in 36 countries to examine how devices are tested, approved, marketed and monitored. Anchoring the probe was an analysis of more than 8 million device-related health records, including death and injury reports and recalls. In total, the ICIJ won 11 awards for the Implant Files.

=== Mauritius Leaks ===
In July 2019, the ICIJ published the Mauritius Leaks, a datajournalistic investigation about how the former British colony Mauritius has transformed itself into a financial centre and tax haven. A whistleblower leaked documents from a law firm in Mauritius to the ICIJ, providing insight in how multinational companies avoid paying taxes when they do business in Africa, the Middle East, and Asia.

=== China Cables ===
In November 2019, the ICIJ revealed classified Chinese government documents leaked by exiled Uighurs, dubbed the China Cables which prove mass surveillance and internment camps of Uighurs and other Muslim minorities in China's Xinjiang province.

=== Luanda Leaks ===
In January 2020, Luanda Leaks revealed how Angola's richest woman, Isabel dos Santos, used a network of Western advisors to amass a fortune. The investigation showed how dos Santos and her husband, Sindika Dokolo, built their empire taking advantage of many secrecy jurisdictions.

=== FinCEN Files ===
In September 2020, the ICIJ along with BuzzFeed News published leaked documents from the Financial Crimes Enforcement Network (FinCEN) that describe suspicious financial transactions across multiple global financial institutions.

=== Pandora Papers ===
On 3 October 2021, the ICIJ began publishing 11.9 million leaked documents (comprising 2.9 terabytes of data) that came to be known as the Pandora Papers. The ICIJ described the document leak as their most expansive exposé of financial secrecy yet, containing documents, images, emails and spreadsheets from 14 financial service companies, in nations including Panama, Switzerland and the UAE, surpassing their previous release of the Panama Papers in 2016, which had 11.5 million confidential documents.

In total, the ICIJ won nine awards for the Pandora Papers including the Overseas Press Club of America's Malcolm Forbes Award for international business reporting and the WAN-IFRA North American Digital Media Award.

=== Ericsson List ===
In February 2022, the ICIJ published the Ericsson List, an internal investigation into corruption inside the Swedish multinational networking and telecommunications company Ericsson. It detailed corruption in at least 10 countries. Ericsson has admitted "serious breaches of compliance rules".

=== Uber Files ===
In July 2022, the ICIJ published the Uber Files, a leaked database of Uber's activities in about 40 countries from 2013 to 2017. The documents were leaked to The Guardian, and shared with the ICIJ and a number of media organisations.

=== Deforestation Inc. ===
In March 2023, the ICIJ published Deforestation Inc., a nine-month investigation into greenwashing practices pertained by major environmental auditing firms. The investigation was conducted in collaboration with 39 media partners from 27 countries worldwide.

=== Cyprus Confidential ===
In November 2023, ICIJ and 68 partners reported on the financial network which supports the regime of Vladimir Putin. The roughly 3.6 million leaked documents were obtained variously via Distributed Denial of Secrets, Paper Trail Media, and the Organized Crime and Corruption Reporting Project (OCCRP). They contain confidential information from financial services companies, mostly with connections to Cyprus, and show that country to have strong links with high-up figures in the Kremlin, some of whom have been sanctioned. The investigation purports to show "how 67 of the 105 Russian billionaires on the 2023 Forbes World’s Billionaires List used financial services firms on the island to hide their wealth and keep it out of reach from Western sanctions". The investigation was initiated by ZDF, Der Spiegel and ICIJ, and involved more than 270 journalists from 69 media companies worldwide, including the political journal "frontal", the Washington Post, the Guardian, the Austrian Der Standard and the Swiss research network Tamedia.

=== Social Discovery Group ===
In July 2026, the International Consortium of Investigative Journalists (ICIJ) reported that Social Discovery Group operated a "pay-per-action" dating app scheme using influencers to exploit users, according to the ICIJ investigation "Inside the Matrix". The report indicates this scheme involved models and strict engagement quotas across platforms such as AmoLatina, which is operated by the Russian-owned company.

== Data journalism ==
In the course of the Panama Papers and Paradise Papers investigations, ICIJ was challenged to learn about and implement various technologies to manage international collaboration on terabytes of data – structured and unstructured (e.g. emails, PDFs) – and how to extract meaningful information from this data. Among the technologies used were the Neo4j graph database management system and Linkurious to search and visualize the data. The data-intensive projects involved not just veteran investigative journalists, but also demanded data journalists and programmers.

Datashare
- Developers: ICIJ, EPFL
- Stable release: 20.14.0 / 25 February 2026; 8 months ago
- Operating system: Linux; macOS; Microsoft Windows
- Website: datashare.icij.org
- Repository: github.com/ICIJ/datashare

ICIJ's research platform is called Datashare. It is free and open source. Datashare was developed by ICIJ together with Swiss university École Polytechnique Fédérale de Lausanne. In 2021, Datashare was improved to make 11.9 million records (2.9 terabytes) available to more than 600 journalists. Also in 2021, the ICIJ's technology team built a new open-source platform, Prophecies, to make data fact-checking more efficient.

ICIJ's public Offshore Leaks Database a repository of information on companies registered in tax havens. It uses machine-learning techniques to analyze data. The ICIJ also provides advice on the use of other public databases, as well as research assistance to partner journalists.

== Collaborative journalism ==
The ICIJ's collaborative journalism model has been described as a new departure for global journalism that embraces collaboration. ICIJ's cross-border collaboration, involves more than 140 newspapers, television and radio stations, and online media organizations, and is marked by transparency and peer scrutiny. The stories that result from the collaboration are published simultaneously around the world and made available to readers free.

== Funding ==
The ICIJ is funded by donations. Financial supporters of the project include the Adessium Foundation, the Bertha Foundation, the National Endowment for Democracy and the Open Society Foundations.

== Awards and recognition ==
ICIJ's collaborations have received several awards, including the 2017 Pulitzer Prize for Explanatory Reporting. Their work to uncover financial secrecy was nominated for the 2021 Nobel Peace Prize. In 2021, the ICIJ also won a News Emmy along with PBS Frontline for its Luanda Leaks investigation and was named a Pulitzer Prize finalist for the FinCEN Files.

In 2022, the ICIJ was awarded the Katharine Graham Award for courage and accountability by the White House Correspondents’ Association. ICIJ also received an Honourable Mention award at the 2022 Allard Prize for International Integrity.

The ICIJ organized the bi-annual Daniel Pearl Awards for Outstanding International Investigative Reporting. The award is currently not being awarded.

GuideStar, a nonprofits evaluator, gave the ICIJ a "Gold Seal of Transparency" in 2019.

== See also ==
- Center for Public Integrity (United States)
- European Investigative Collaborations
