= Offshore Leaks =

Disclosure of tax haven client data in 2013

Group structure and statistics of “Gourmet Master Co. Ltd.”, as of 31 December 2017, with hyperlinks to the ICIJ Offshore Leaks Database. Cf. usage instructions for this interactive SVG at the file's description page on Wikimedia Commons.

Offshore Leaks is a report disclosing details of 130,000 offshore accounts that came out in April 2013. Prior to the release of the Panama Papers in 2016 (which itself was surpassed by the Pandora Papers in 2021), it was the largest disclosure of information relating to clandestine offshore banking.

The report originated from the Washington D.C.–based investigative journalism nonprofit, the International Consortium of Investigative Journalists (ICIJ), who collaborated with reporters around the world to produce the series of investigative reports published in connection with ICIJ's The Global Muckraker. The investigation is based on a cache of 2.5 million secret records about the offshore assets of people from 170 countries and territories, obtained by ICIJ's director, Gerard Ryle.

The ICIJ Offshore Leaks Database is headed with the cautionary paragraph: "There are legitimate uses for offshore companies and trusts. We do not intend to suggest or imply that any persons, companies or other entities included in the ICIJ Offshore Leaks Database have broken the law or otherwise acted improperly." More than 100 journalists from more than 60 countries and dozens of news organizations have taken part in the investigation, which has since expanded to include revelations about the offshore holdings of China's business and political elites.

== People ==
Imee Marcos, daughter of the former Philippine president Ferdinand Edralin Marcos, is on the list. Philippine authorities are investigating if the money is part of the $5 billion of unexplained wealth with which Marcos fled from the country in the 1980s. Also on the list are the family of Azerbaijani President Ilham Aliyev, former Prime Minister of Georgia Bidzina Ivanishvili, Olga Shuvalov (the wife of former Russian First Vice Premier Igor Shuvalov), Deputy Director of the Board of Gazprom Valeriy Golubev, and Ukrainian oligarchs Rinat Akhmetov and Dmytro Firtash.

Kazi Zafarullah, a relative of Bangladesh's Prime Minister Sheikh Hasina, and his wife are shareholders of two offshore companies in the British Virgin Islands.

== Reactions ==
A German politician, Peer Steinbrück, has called for harsh penalties for the banks involved in the scandal, up to revoking their licenses. ICIJ reports that the series of stories has sparked "official investigations, sweeping policy changes and high-profile resignations" around the world, with the European Union's top tax official calling Offshore Leaks “the most significant trigger” behind Europe's new push to crack down on offshore hideaways and global tax dodging. “We're in a completely different context today” because of the Offshore Leaks revelations, Belgium's secretary of state said. “It’s a new world.”

IBC consultant Ryan Mohanlal responded that each enterprise, holding, corporation or entity which is registered has its own reasons for doing so and that there are legitimate reasons to incorporate in this form.

In Brazil, ICIJ's criteria for selecting journalists has been criticized for lack of transparency. The journalists chosen by ICIJ are part of media conglomerates that could potentially have connections with offshore account owners. Claims that UOL (a joint venture between Grupo Abril and Folha de S. Paulo) and O Globo (from military dictatorship backers Grupo Globo) journalists might pick and disclose names according to political bias rather than public interest eventually led investigative reporter Amaury Ribeiro Jr. to leave the ICIJ.

== Primary data ==
As of 15 June 2013 a searchable database which includes part of the data is available under the URL http://offshoreleaks.icij.org/. So far the full primary data set has not been made publicly available.

There is no known connection between the ICIJ "Offshore Leaks" and "WikiLeaks".

== Investigations ==
By July 2021, the Government of India identified undeclared assets worth of about ₹11,010 crore (equivalent to ₹130 billion or US$1.4 billion in 2026) following the investigation.

== See also ==
- Football Leaks
- Luxembourg Leaks
- Offshore financial centre
- Panama Papers
- Pandora Papers
- Paradise Papers
- Swiss Leaks
- Suisse secrets
- Tax haven
