= Swiss Leaks =

2015 exposé of tax avoidance scheme

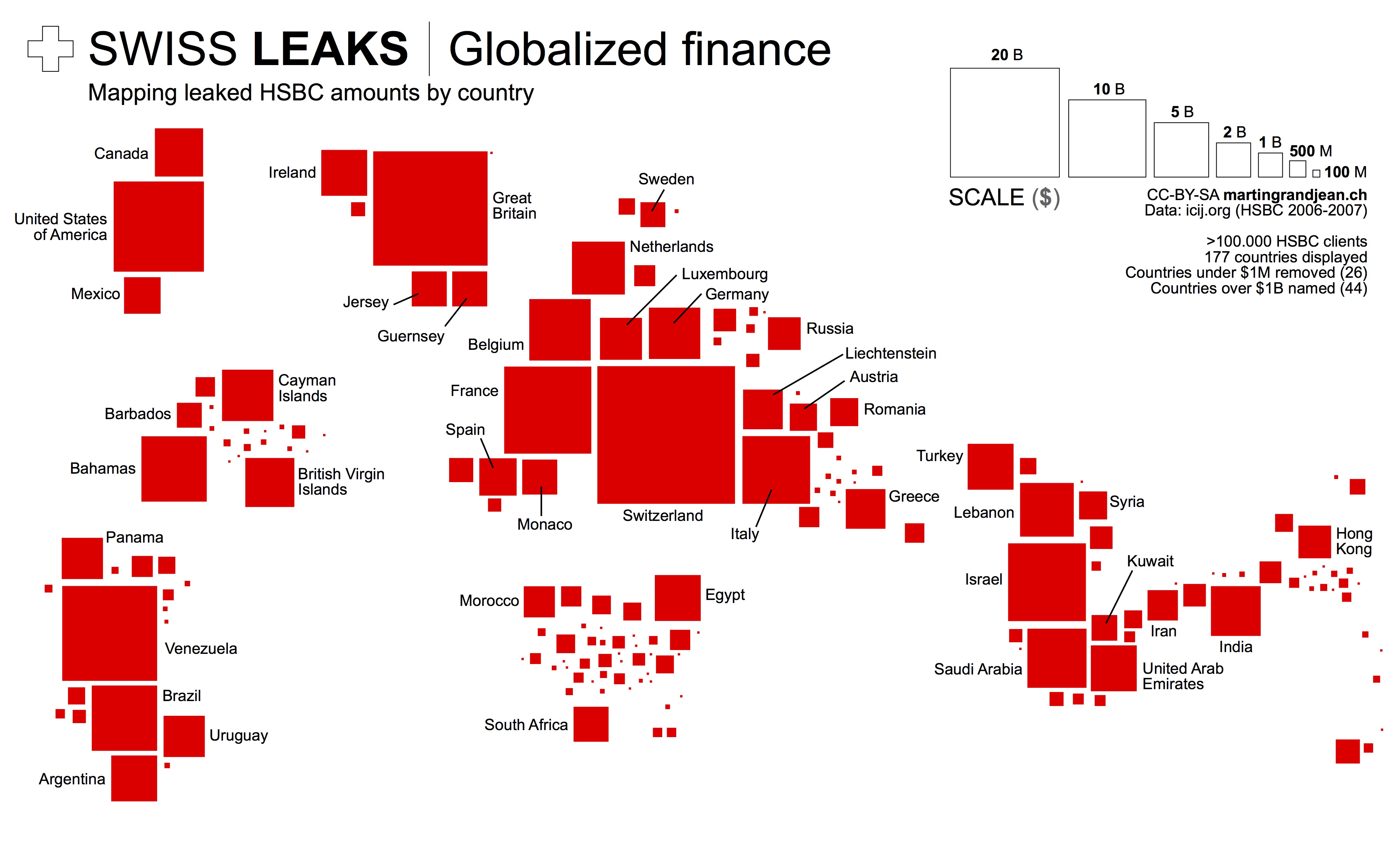
Swissleaks: the map of the HSBC bank accounts

Swiss Leaks (or SwissLeaks) is a journalistic investigation, released in February 2015, of a giant tax evasion scheme allegedly operated with the knowledge and encouragement of the British multinational bank HSBC via its Swiss subsidiary, HSBC Private Bank (Suisse). Triggered by leaked information from French computer analyst Hervé Falciani on accounts held by over 100,000 clients and 20,000 offshore companies with HSBC in Geneva, the disclosed information was then called "the biggest leak in Swiss banking history".

== Investigation ==
Investigators allege that 180.6 billion euros passed through HSBC accounts held in Geneva by over 100,000 clients and 20,000 offshore companies between November 2006 and March 2007. The data for this period comes from files removed from HSBC Private Bank by a former staffer, software engineer Hervé Falciani, who fled to Lebanon with the attempt to sell it. Later he handed it to French authorities in late 2008.

=== Investigation in France ===
In December 2008, Falciani was detained by Swiss authorities, who questioned him concerning suspected data theft. Released "overnight" by Swiss police, he fled with his family and the data files to France.

On January 20, 2009, the prosecutor’s office in Nice, responding to a request from Swiss authorities, ordered a search of Falciani's father's home, where he had been staying. The Nice prosecutors began examining the files Falciani and decided that they were of relevance to France's interest, and refused the Swiss extradition request.

The data, some 600 files with a total size over 100 GB, took time to analyze, but French authorities were assisted by Falciani. By early 2010, French tax authorities had begun notifying other countries' tax officials about the files.

In April 2015, Nina Ricci's heir, Arlette Ricci, was convicted of tax evasion in a Paris court on the basis of the Swiss Leaks files. Ricci was given a three-year prison sentence, two of them suspended, and had real estate in Paris and Corsica seized. She was also assessed a million-euro fine, for showing a "particularly determined willingness" to hide money (some €18m) with the help of HSBC. Some 50 other wealthy French individuals were expected to be brought to court for similar activities (several others having settled out of court, of the 72 originally up for prosecution).

Five days earlier, HSBC itself had been charged in France for complicity in concealing fiscal fraud and illegal selling via its Swiss branch.

=== Investigation in Morocco ===
According to the International Consortium of Investigation Journalists (ICIJ), which treated the data of the Swiss Leaks, Morocco is concerned by $1.6 billion of tax evasion and stands at thirty-seventh place of the affected countries. Morocco stands at twenty-third place for the number of clients (1068). The maximal amount of tax evasion for one client was $74.1 million and the average was $1.5 million. As stated in the Moroccan law, it is strictly forbidden to have a foreign bank account. But the documents revealed that the royal family were part of the HSBC clients. Prince Moulay Rachid was touched by this scandal, the princess Lalla Meryem and the current king Mohammed VI with an amount $9.1 million hidden in the HSBC bank.

=== International investigation ===
Given the scale of the investigation, Le Monde called upon 154 journalists affiliated with 47 different media outlets including: The Guardian, CBS, Süddeutsche Zeitung, and The Indian Express, among others, to help analyze the data. The International Consortium of Investigative Journalists (ICIJ) has been coordinating this international collaborative effort.

In February 2015, the International Consortium of Investigative Journalists (ICIJ) website released information about bank accounts in Switzerland under the title Swiss Leaks: Murky Cash Sheltered by Bank Secrecy, which involves the Swiss Leaks Project, a website containing almost 60,000 leaked files that provide details on over 100,000 HSBC clients and their bank accounts.

=== Involvement ===
The Swiss Leaks Project's investigations revealed that HSBC's Geneva branch, ignoring these rules, helped people accused of drug-running, corruption, money-laundering or arms-dealing conceal billions of dollars in Switzerland.

Among the 66 names revealed by the Swiss Leaks investigation are:

- Rami Makhlouf, whose cousin and close associate, Syrian President Bashar al Assad
- Katex Mines Guinee, a company fingered by the United Nations as a "possible provider of weapons" in Liberia's civil war
- Erez Daleyot, a Belgian-Israeli diamond tycoon, connected to arms trafficking, blood diamonds and bribery
- Jeffrey Tesler, a lawyer and key participant in the $182-million Halliburton Bribery Scandal
- Rachid Mohamed Rachid, the former Egyptian trade minister who fled Cairo in February 2011 amid the uprising against Hosni Mubarak. Rachid was convicted in absentia for alleged profiteering and squandering public funds.
- Vladimir Aleksandrovich Antonov, a Russian banker accused of looting £400m from the Lithuanian Snoras bank

The top 10 countries involved, in terms of dollar amounts and number of clients in leaked Swiss files, are shown in the tables below.

10 most-involved involved countries by dollar amount
| Rank | Country | Amount (billions of US$) |
|---|---|---|
| 1 | Switzerland | 31.2 |
| 2 | France | 29.5 |
| 3 | United Kingdom | 21.7 |
| 4 | Venezuela | 14.8 |
| 5 | United States | 13.4 |
| 6 | Israel | 10 |
| 7 | Italy | 7.5 |
| 8 | Bahamas | 7 |
| 9 | Brazil | 7 |
| 10 | Belgium | 6.3 |

10 most-involved countries by client count
| Rank | Country | Number of clients |
|---|---|---|
| 1 | Switzerland | 11,235 |
| 2 | France | 9,187 |
| 3 | United Kingdom | 8,844 |
| 4 | Brazil | 8,667 |
| 5 | Italy | 7,499 |
| 6 | Israel | 6,544 |
| 7 | United States | 4,183 |
| 8 | Argentina | 3,625 |
| 9 | Turkey | 3,105 |
| 10 | Belgium | 3,002 |

By July 2021, the Government of India identified undeclared assets worth of about ₹8,465 crore (equivalent to ₹95 billion or US$990 million in 2023) following the investigation and levied ₹1,294 crore (equivalent to ₹15 billion or US$150 million in 2023) in tax penalty.

=== HSBC trial ===
In March 2015, the French financial state prosecutor requested that HSBC's Swiss private bank was sent to criminal trial over the suspected tax-dodging scheme for wealthy customers. The recommendation followed a lengthy investigation by local magistrates into alleged tax fraud involving 3,000 French taxpayers and was a procedural step that brought the Swiss banking arm one step closer to a possible trial in France.

In November 2017, HSBC agreed to pay 300 million euros ($352 million) to avoid going to trial in France for enabling tax fraud. The deal struck between the financial crime prosecutor's office and the bank was a first in France under a new procedure that allowed companies under suspicion of corruption or dissimulation of tax fraud to negotiate a fine to stop a case from going to trial.

French prosecutors have now dropped the case against HSBC Holdings.

== Media coverage ==
BBC reported that HSBC had put pressure on media not to report about the controversy, with British newspaper The Guardian claiming HSBC advertising had been put "on pause" after The Guardian's coverage of the matter. Peter Oborne, chief political commentator at the Daily Telegraph resigned from the paper; in an open letter he claimed the Daily Telegraph suppressed negative stories and dropped investigations into HSBC because of the bank's advertising. CBS published a story about the leaks in its news program 60 Minutes.

== See also ==
- Banking in Switzerland
- 2008 Liechtenstein tax affair
- Lagarde list – a subset of the data set, passed on to the Greek government in 2010 by French finance minister Christine Lagarde
- Football Leaks
- Luxembourg Leaks
- Offshore financial centre
- Offshore Leaks
- Tax haven
- Panama Papers
- Suisse Secrets, 2022
- HSBC and Lebanon banking controversy
