= Bárcenas =

Barcenas or Bárcenas is a surname. Notable people with the surname include:

== Barcenas ==
- Loretta Barcenas, Filipino sprinter
- Melanie Barcenas (born 2007), American professional soccer player

== Bárcenas ==
- Alejandro Bárcenas, Venezuelan philosopher
- Delvim Fabiola Bárcenas (born 1977), Mexican politician
- Édgar Yoel Bárcenas, Panamanian international footballer
- José Ascensión Orihuela Bárcenas (born 1952), Mexican politician
- José Juan Bárcenas (born 1961), Mexican politician
- Luis Bárcenas, Spanish politician
  - Bárcenas affair, a major corruption case in Spain with Luis Bárcenas as a major actor
- Perla Bárcenas, Mexican Paralympic powerlifter
- Rafael E. Bárcenas (born 1944), Panamanian businessman

== See also ==
- Bárcena (surname)
- De la Bárcena
