= José Bárcenas =

José Bárcenas may refer to:

- José Ascensión Orihuela Bárcenas (born 1952), Mexican politician
- José Juan Bárcenas (born 1961), Mexican politician
