= Ramón Fonseca Mora =

Panamanian novelist and lawyer (1952–2024)

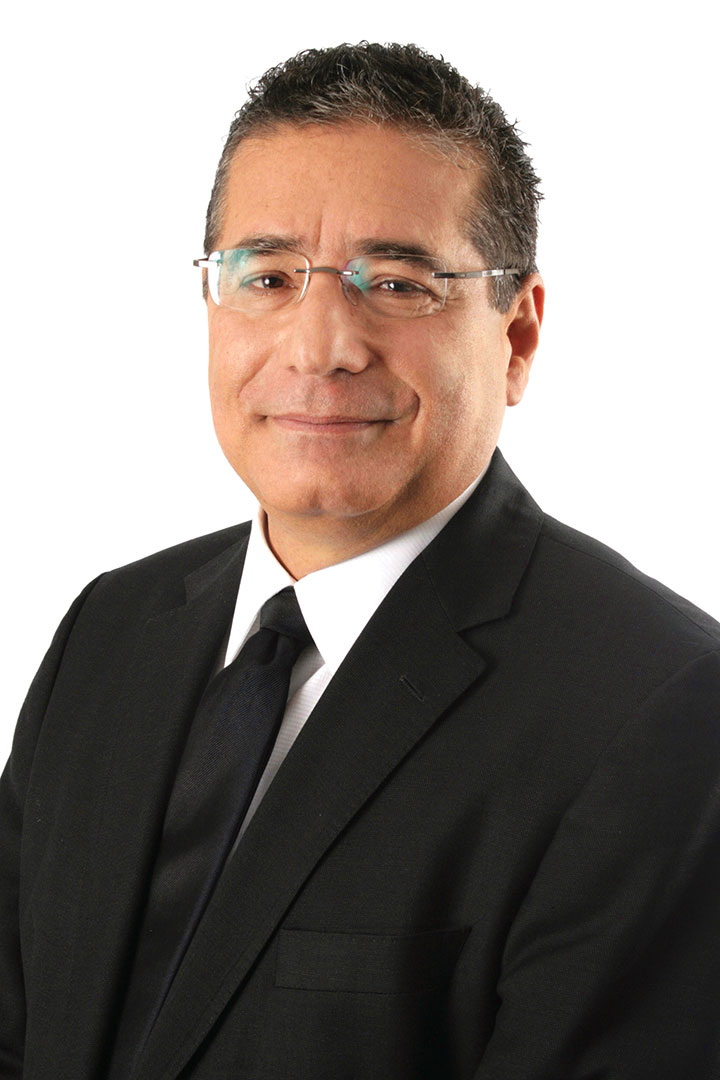
- Fonseca in 2009
- Born: 14 July 1952; Panama City, Panama
- Died: 8 May 2024 (aged 71); Panama City, Panama
- Education: University of Panama; London School of Economics
- Occupations: Novelist, lawyer
- Known for: Co-founder of Mossack Fonseca
- Political party: Panameñista Party
- Children: 6
- Website: fonsecamora.com

Ramón Fonseca Mora (14 July 1952 – 8 May 2024) was a Panamanian novelist, lawyer and co-founder of Mossack Fonseca, a former law firm based in Panama with more than 40 offices worldwide. He was minister-counselor of Panamanian President Juan Carlos Varela, and president of the Panameñista Party until he was dismissed in March 2016, due to the Brazilian Operation Car Wash anti-corruption probe.

In 2016, Mossack Fonseca was raided by police on suspicion of money-laundering, bribery and corruption. Fonseca and his partner Jürgen Mossack were arrested and jailed on 10 February 2017. They were initially refused bail because of flight risk, but were released on 21 April 2017 on US$500,000 bail each, after a judge ruled they had cooperated with the investigation. In March 2018, the firm shut down in the wake of its involvement in the Panama Papers affair. Numerous lawsuits including serious allegations of collusion with despotic regimes, mafia, and global criminals are ongoing.

== Early life ==
Fonseca was born on 14 July 1952 in Panama and studied law and political science at the University of Panama and the London School of Economics.

He stated that as a young man, "he hoped to save the world", and considered joining the priesthood. But, he revealed in a 2008 television interview that, "I didn't save anything, I didn't make any change. I decided then, as I was a little more mature, to dedicate myself to my profession, to have a family, to get married and have a regular life … As one gets older, you turn more materialistic."

== Career ==
In 1977, Fonseca and Jürgen Mossack founded the law firm Mossack Fonseca in Panama City. It went on to become the world's fourth-largest offshore law firm, with more than 40 offices all over the world. In March 2018, the firm shut down in the wake of its involvement in the Panama Papers affair.

He was also a member of the Panameñista Party.

Fonseca was also an award-winning novelist. He wrote four novels, along with plays and short stories. He was awarded the Ricardo Miró Prize, the national literary award in Panama, twice, for novels Dance of the Butterflies (1994) and Dream City (1998).

== Criminal investigations ==
=== Panama Papers ===
Following the leak of 11.5 million Mossack Fonseca documents by an anonymous whistle-blower to the German newspaper Süddeutsche Zeitung in 2016, it was revealed how offshore tax regimes were exploited for tax purposes. While offshore entities are not in themselves illegal, the documents showed how some of the more than 214,000 shell companies set up by Mossack Fonseca were used for illegal purposes, including fraud and tax evasion. The documents were shared with the International Consortium of Investigative Journalists. As a result, more than 150 inquiries and criminal investigations were launched in more than 70 countries worldwide.

On 20 October 2020, prosecutors in Cologne, Germany issued international arrest warrants for Fonseca and his German-born law partner, Jürgen Mossack. Charges against them include accessory to tax evasion and forming a criminal organization, with the firm noted as central to the investigation.

The charges against Fonseca were dropped when he died in May 2024.

=== Money laundering in Brazil ===
According to court papers filed on 15 October 2019, Mossack and Fonseca "are the subjects of an FBI Investigation in the Southern District of New York" and are "defending criminal charges against them in Panama."

In February 2017, both Fonseca and Mossack were arrested in connection with an investigation into money laundering and corruption in Brazil, known as Operation Car Wash. They were released on bail the following April.

== Personal life ==
Fonseca had six children. He was previously married to Elizabeth Ward Neiman, who became the Ambassador of the Republic of Panama to the Netherlands on 9 September 2020. As of April 2016 his son, Eduardo Fonseca Ward, was the former ambassador to the UAE. Fonseca died at a hospital in Panama City due to pneumonia on 8 May 2024, at the age of 71.

== Works ==
- 1976: Las cortes internacionales de justicia
- 1977: Reflexiones de derecho judicial
- 1985: Compañías panameñas
- 1988: Panamá, un viejo lugar bajo el sol
- 1994: La danza de las mariposas, won the Ricardo Miró Prize, Panama's national book award
- 1995: La isla de las iguanas
- 1996: La ventana abierta
- 1997: Ojitos de ángel
- 1998: Soñar con la ciudad, won the Ricardo Miró Prize
- 2000: 4 mujeres vestidas de negro
- 2007: El desenterrador
- 2012: Míster Politicus, "articulates the tangled processes that unscrupulous officials use to gain power and achieve their detestable ambitions"

== In popular culture ==
In 2016, Steven Soderbergh announced he would produce a film about the Panama Papers affair. The comedy-drama The Laundromat premiered at the Venice Film Festival on 1 September 2019. Fonseca and Mossack tried to block the film's release on Netflix by filing a defamation lawsuit against Netflix in October 2019, arguing that the ongoing FBI investigation and possible trial in New York as well as their defence against criminal charges in Panama could be negatively prejudiced by the way they are portrayed in The Laundromat. A judge ruled that the case was filed in the wrong court, transferring it to Los Angeles. With a court decision still pending, the film was made available for streaming by Netflix on 18 October 2019. In the film, Fonseca is portrayed by Antonio Banderas.
