= Bárcena =

Bárcena or Barcena may refer to:

- Bárcena de Campos, a municipality in the province of Palencia, Castile and León, Spain
- Bárcena de Cicero, a municipality in the autonomous community of Cantabria, Spain
- Bárcena de Pie de Concha, a municipality in the autonomous community of Cantabria, Spain
- Volcán Bárcena, a Mexican volcano
- Bárcena (surname)
- Barcena Druges, a taxonomic synonym of the plant genus Colubrina
