= Reactions to the Panama Papers =

This article lists some of the reactions and responses from countries and other official bodies regarding the leak of legal documents related to offshore tax havens from the law firm Mossack Fonseca, called the Panama Papers.

== Government reactions and investigations ==
=== Argentina ===
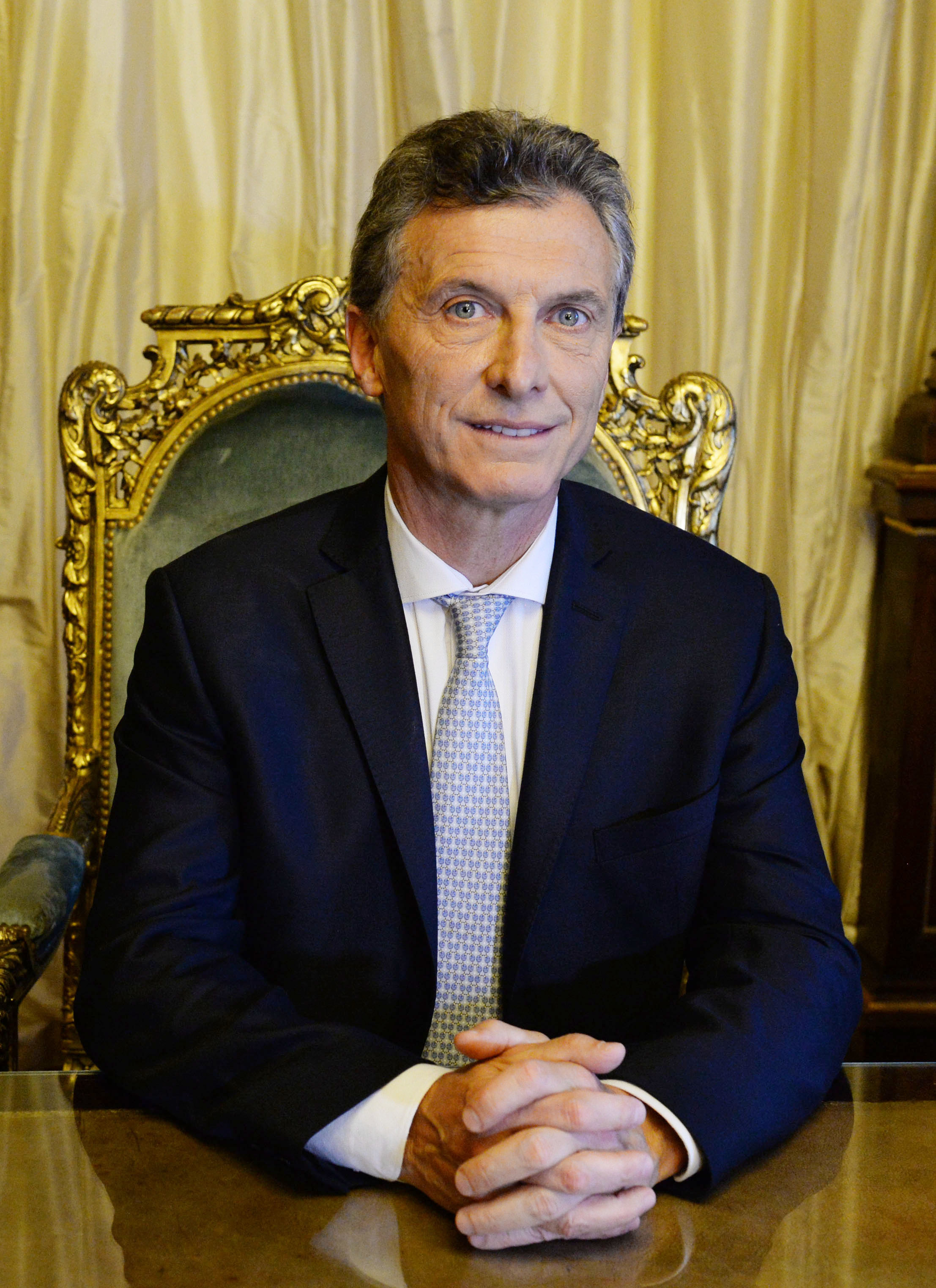
Argentine President Mauricio Macri

Argentine President Mauricio Macri is listed as head of a trading company based in the Bahamas that he did not disclose during his tenure as Mayor of Buenos Aires; it is not clear whether disclosure of non-equity directorships was then required under Argentine law.

On April 7, 2016, federal prosecutor Federico Delgado began a formal investigation into Macri's involvement with Fleg Trading Ltd., the company registered in Panama for which President Macri was listed as director. Judge Sebastián Casanello was asked to start the file on the inquiry. The initial petition was made by Neuquén representative Darío Martínez. Martínez claims Macri could be guilty of perjury due to omissions made in his sworn statement. Martínez also referenced another offshore company, Kagemusha SA (named after Akira Kurosawa's 1980 film), which had been established in 1981 and to which President Macri also had connections.

On 20 September 2017, the civil judge Andrés Fraga determined that in the company Fleg Trading Ltd, of the Bahamas, Mauricio Macri only accepted the position of director for which he was appointed to the sole and only effect of designating a replacement and resigning, and that in Kagemusha he did not even accept tacitly the position of director for which he was appointed by Francisco Macri. The ruling adds that neither of the two companies he was a shareholder, that he did not receive any dividends or profits, did not participate in the business decisions or in any business, nor was he the owner or co-owner of any current bank account of the companies.

The family of Argentine football player Lionel Messi announced that they will file a complaint after reports accused him of assembling a tax evasion network in Panama. The family denied Messi had been involved and called the accusations slanderous. They said that the company referred to in the Panama Papers was inactive and that Messi had declared all income from image rights before and after proceedings with the Argentine Tax Agency.

=== Armenia ===
On April 4, 2016 Hetq Online reported that according to the Panama Papers, Major-General of Justice and head of the Armenia's Compulsory Enforcement Service Mihran Poghosyan was connected to three Panama-registered companies (Sigtem Real Estates Inc., Hopkinten Trading Inc. and Bangio Invest S.A., being the sole owner of Sigtem and Hopkinten). On April 8, Armenian Transparency International Anti-Corruption Center filed a petition with the Ethics Committee for High Level Officials, requesting an investigation of Poghosyan. Members of the families of Poghosyan's uncles Grigor and Mikhail Haroutyunyan were also mentioned in connection with his business.

=== Australia ===
In 2016, the Australian Taxation Office announced that it is investigating 800 individual Australian taxpayers on the Mossack Fonseca list of clients and that some of the cases may be referred to the country's Serious Financial Crime Task Force.

=== Azerbaijan ===
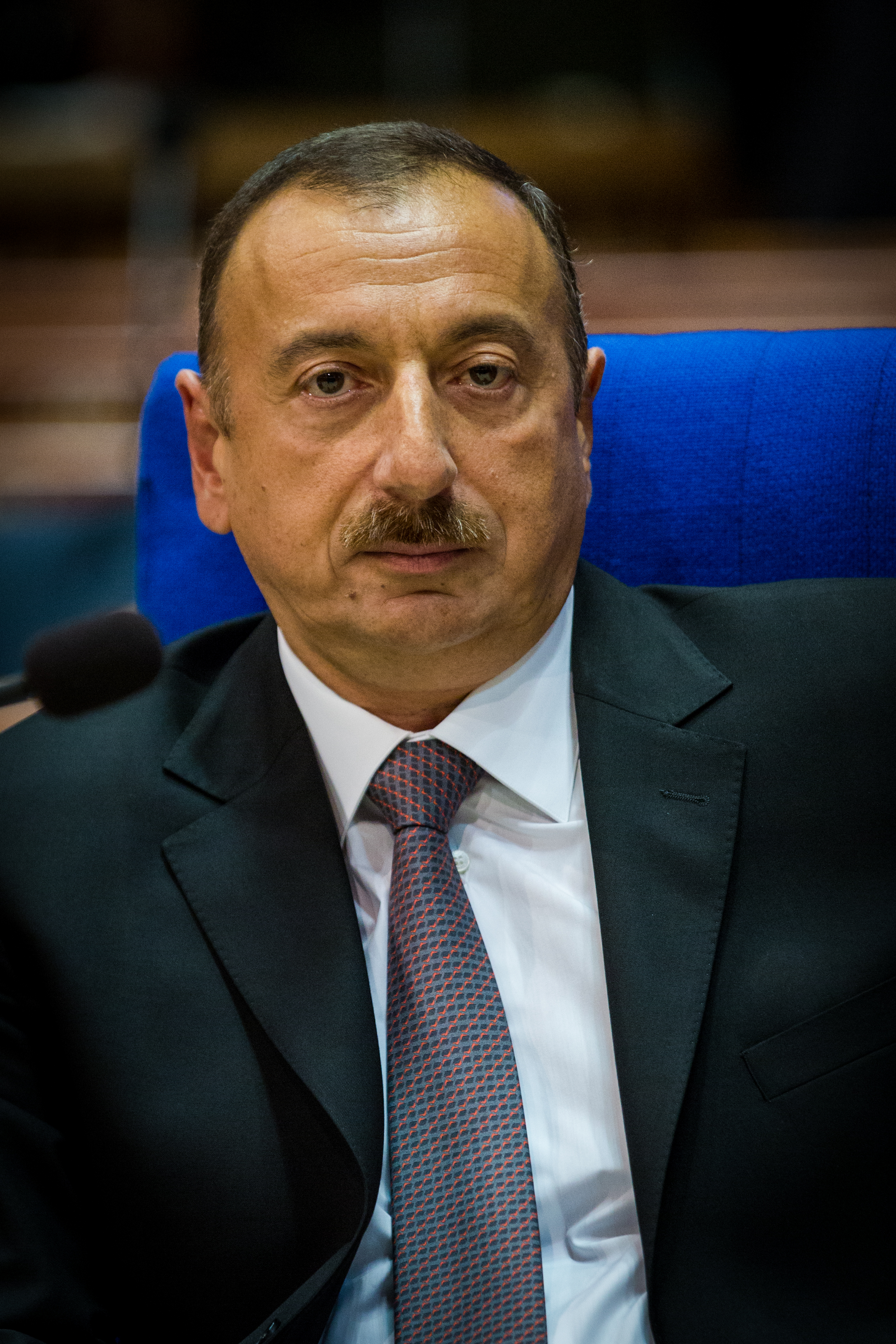
President of Azerbaijan Ilham Aliyev

Azerbaijani President Ilham Aliyev did not respond to repeated requests for comments.

According to ICIJ website, "The family of Azerbaijan President Ilham Aliyev leads a charmed, glamorous life, thanks in part to financial interests in almost every sector of the economy. ... [Aliyev's daughter] Arzu, has financial stakes in a firm that won rights to mine for gold in the western village of Chovdar and Azerfon, the country's largest mobile phone business. Arzu is also a significant shareholder in SW Holding, which controls nearly every operation related to Azerbaijan Airlines ("Azal"), from meals to airport taxis. Both sisters and brother Heydar own property in Dubai valued at roughly $75 million in 2010; Heydar is the legal owner of nine luxury mansions in Dubai purchased for some $44 million."

=== Bangladesh ===
According to numerous media outlets, two conglomerates and thirty-two Bangladeshi shareholders are listed. Top business personalities include Muhammed Aziz Khan, Mohiuddin, and Samson H. Chowdhury. Awami League Presidium member Kazi Zafarullah and his wife Nilufar Zafar are said to be in the list.

On April 7, 2016, The Anti Corruption Commission Bangladesh launched an inquiry to obtain details of the businesses and individuals and said that tax evaders would be brought to trial and punished.

=== Brazil ===
Politicians from seven parties in Brazil were named as clients of a Panama-based firm at the center of a massive data leak over possible tax evasion. The leaked files included politicians from Brazil's largest party, the PMDB, which broke away from President Dilma Rousseff's coalition in 2016. Political figures from the PSDB, the most prominent opposition party in the country, was also mentioned in the leaks, as well as others from the PDT, PP, PSB, PSD and the PTB parties. No politicians from Rousseff's Workers' Party were mentioned in the leaks. A research in the Panama papers, from a group of Dutch journalists from the daily newspaper Trouw, has shown that TV Globo is cited "many times" in a money laundering investigation of the De Nederlandsche Bank which revealed that for years the media outlet conducted several "irregular financial transactions" through tax havens in order to pay broadcast rights for the Copa Libertadores.

=== British Virgin Islands ===
In the British Virgin Islands Mossack Fonseca were subjected to a 6-month investigation by the regulator, the British Virgin Islands Financial Services Commission. At the end of the investigation they were fined US$440,000 for breaches of regulations countering terrorist financing regulations and against money laundering. The fine was the highest ever levied by the regulator, and just short of the maximum fine that they had power to impose.

=== Canada ===
Canadian Prime Minister Justin Trudeau has denied any involvement with the leak, saying "I have entirely and completely been transparent about mine and my family’s finances. That is something I learned early on that Canadians expect from their leaders." The Government has ordered the Canada Revenue Agency to find copies of the Panama Papers, in order to find any Canadians that used offshore accounts to avoid taxes.

The Royal Bank of Canada CEO David McKay announced that the bank set up a team that will look back through four decades of documentation for ties to Mossack Fonseca. CEO Bill Downe of the Bank of Montreal also defended, saying "Canadian banks have 'dramatically' beefed up anti-money laundering controls over the last seven to 10 years." He also stated that any link between Canadian businesses and the Panama Papers would have originated a long time ago, before the time when Canadian banks took action to stop money laundering.

=== China ===
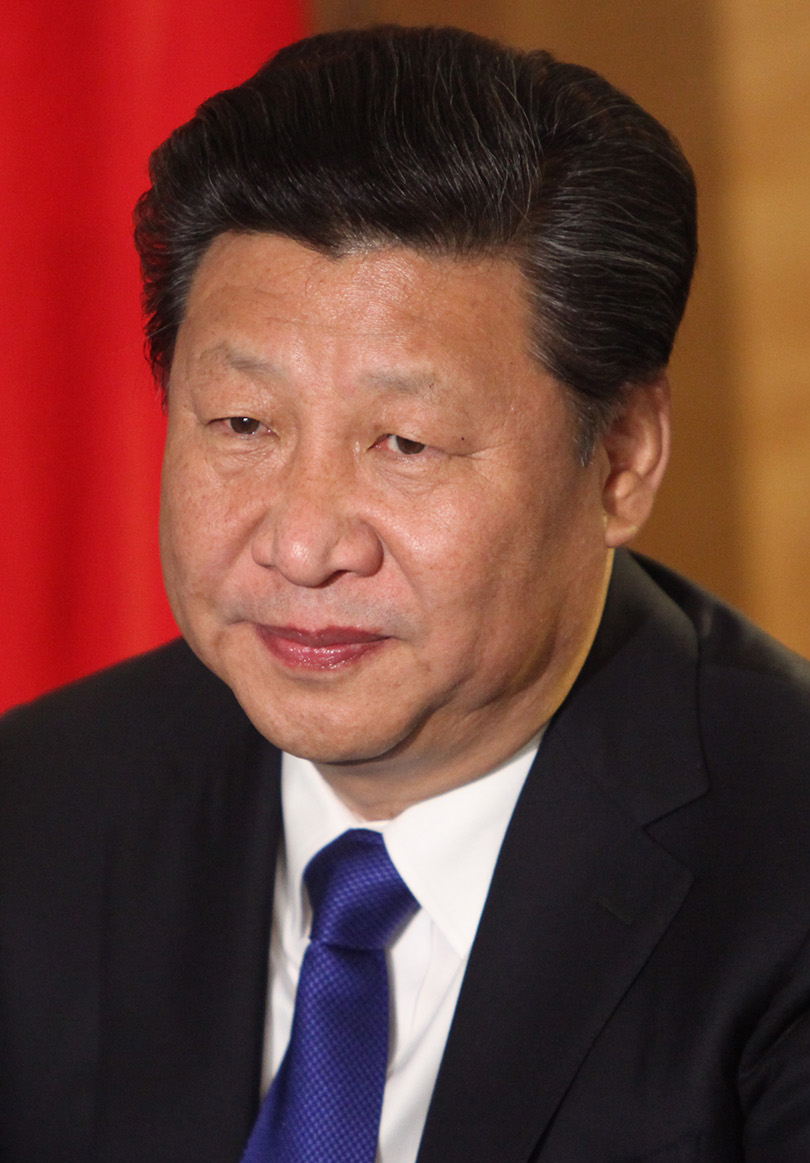
China's paramount leader Xi Jinping

Relatives of highly placed Chinese officials including seven senior leaders and former senior leaders of Politburo of the Chinese Communist Party have been named, including former Premier Li Peng's daughter Li Xiaolin, former Communist Party General Secretary Hu Yaobang's son Hu Dehua and Deng Jiagui, the brother-in-law of current General Secretary of the Chinese Communist Party Xi Jinping. Deng had two shell companies in the British Virgin Islands while Xi was a member of the Politburo Standing Committee, but they were dormant by the time Xi became General Secretary of Communist Party (paramount leader) in 2012. Others named include the son and daughter-in-law of propaganda chief Liu Yunshan and the son-in-law of Vice-Premier Zhang Gaoli. China's government is suppressing mentions of the Panama Papers on social media and in search engines results. China's Communist party reportedly has told news organizations to delete all content related to the Panama Papers leak.

Considering the material to be a concerted foreign media attack on China, internet information offices were immediately given verbal orders to delete reprinted reports on the Panama Papers, and not to follow up on related content without exceptions. Hong Lei, the spokesman of China's Foreign Ministry, responded that he had "no comment" for "such groundless accusations" at an April 5 news conference.

China is in the third year of an anti-corruption campaign launched by Xi which has punished more than 300,000 party officials for financial misdeeds and created many enemies for Xi.

Chinese authorities have blocked almost all information about the Panama Papers on Chinese media and the Internet. A screenshot showed that the authority had forced all websites to delete content about the Panama Papers. Foreign websites such as Wikileak, China Digital Times have been blocked in mainland China. Official media, like The Global Times reported the resignation of Prime Minister of Iceland, but the media never mentioned that the Panama Papers caused the resignation. On Weibo, a Twitter-like social media in China, almost all content about the Panama Papers was deleted. Because Xi's brother-in-law had been named, and the Panama Canal is well known, Weibo users started to use "brother-in-law", "Canal Papers", and other such tags to avoid Weibo's censor. Because of the censorship in mainland China, few Chinese people know of the Panama Papers.

=== Colombia ===
The National Directorate of Taxes and Customs launched an investigation into all 850 clients of Mossack Fonseca Colombia, a subsidiary of Mossack Fonseca that was established in 2009. In 2014, Colombia had placed Panama onto its blacklist of tax havens.

=== Cyprus ===
Central Bank of Cyprus officially declared: "With regard to press reports citing leaked documents, known as the Panama Papers, the Central Bank of Cyprus announces that it is assessing the information to the extent that it may concern the Cypriot banking system and taking, where necessary, appropriate action." A Cypriot online paper said "The Cyprus link stems from the fact that Fonseca runs an office in Cyprus and, more specifically, in Limassol. In a chart, the leaks name Cyprus as a tax haven (countries that offer little or no tax), although it has a corporate tax rate of 12.5%, the same as Ireland."

=== Czech Republic ===
In October 2021, Andrej Babis was campaigning for another term as the country’s prime minister and was ahead in the polls. A week before the first vote, on October 3, the Panama Papers revealed that Babis used a tax haven shell company to buy a French chateau. Czech law requires dislosure of such a purchase, which he failed to do, despite that he was running as a populilst who often spoke out against corruption among the country's elites. He ended up losing the election.

=== European Union ===
Many senior EU figures have been implicated in the Panama Papers scandal. The European Commissioner for Taxation, Pierre Moscovici, has said that the European Union as a whole had a "duty" to prevent the kind of tax avoidance uncovered in the Panama Papers scandal. Moscovici told reporters the use of offshore companies to hide what he called "shocking amounts" of financial assets from tax authorities was "unethical". He estimated that the tax shelters resulted in an annual loss of some €1 trillion in public finances, adding that the European Commission attempted to tighten tax rules across the union since November 2014 due to the "LuxLeaks" tax avoidance scandal (also revealed by the ICIJ), and hoped the extent of the Panama Papers revelations would spur countries to action.

In a 2013 letter unearthed by the Financial Times to then-president of the European Council, Herman Van Rompuy, the Prime Minister of the United Kingdom David Cameron said that offshore trusts should not automatically be subject to the same transparency requirements as shell companies. Some analysts suggested that these actions may affect the outcome of the referendum on UK membership of the EU.

=== Egypt ===
Alaa Mubarak, son of former president Hosni Mubarak, was cited as owning, through holding companies, real estate properties in London.

=== France ===
French financial prosecutors opened a probe, and President François Hollande declared that tax evaders would be brought to trial and punished. Also as a result, France restored Panama to its tax havens list, from which it had recently been removed.

Jean-Marie Le Pen, founder and long-time leader of the right-wing Front National is mentioned in the documents, along with several aides of his daughter Marine Le Pen, the current party leader.

=== Iceland ===
On April 5, 2016, Prime Minister of Iceland Sigmundur Davíð Gunnlaugsson announced his resignation. Reykjavík City Council Member Júlíus Vífill Ingvarsson resigned earlier in the day.

Shortly after initial reports of Sigmundur Davíð's resignation, the Prime Minister's office in Iceland issued a statement to the international press saying that Sigmundur Davíð had not resigned, but rather stepped aside for an unspecified amount of time and would continue to serve as the Chairman of the Progressive Party. In the fall of 2017, Sigmundur Davíð left the Progressive Party and created a populist party called the Centre Party. The Centre Party received 10.9% of the vote in the Icelandic parliamentary election held in October 2017.

=== India ===
Indian Prime Minister Narendra Modi ordered an inquiry, and subsequently the Indian government announced that it was constituting a special multi-agency group comprising officers from the investigative unit of the Central Board of Direct Taxes and its Foreign Tax and Tax Research division, the Financial Intelligence Unit and the Reserve Bank of India. The list contains names of more than 500 prominent Indian actors, politicians and businessmen who have allegedly stashed money in offshore entities in Panama. Some of them include Bollywood megastar Amitabh Bachchan and his daughter-in-law actress Aishwarya Rai Bachchan, DLF promoter KP Singh, Apollo Tyres chairman Onkar Kanwar, Tractors and Farm Equipment Limited chairman Mallika Srinivasan and Iqbal Mirchi, an Indian drug lord.

=== Indonesia ===
Finance Minister, Bambang P.S. Brodjonegoro, immediately responded quickly to the leaked data of tax evasion "Panama Papers" by instructing the Directorate General of Taxation (DGT) to follow up the findings. Leaked investment data originating from Panama law firm, Mossack Fonseca, attracted Bambang's attention because they can be a source of new information about the potential tax that has not been traced.

"I've asked Mr Ken (Dwijugiasteadi), Director General of Taxation, please let's study the data known as Panama Papers", he said at the headquarters of the DGT, Tuesday (5/4).

Finance Minister once said there is potential for the property of the taxpayer around Rp 4,000 trillion, which has not been affected by the tax. He specifies, around Rp 1,400 trillion, is a property that is not taxed, and remitted to the DGT, while the remaining Rp 2,700 trillion, a rich Indonesian deposits in banks abroad.

=== Israel ===
Some 600 Israeli companies and 850 Israeli shareholders are listed. Among the Israeli names found in the leaked documents are: top attorney Dov Weissglass, who was the bureau chief of the late prime minister Ariel Sharon; Jacob Engel, a businessman active in the African mining industry; and Idan Ofer, a member of one of Israel's wealthiest families, according to Haaretz. Tareq Abbas, a son of Mahmoud Abbas, the president of the Palestinian Authority, was also revealed to hold $1 million in shares of an offshore company associated with the Palestinian Authority.

Weissglass' name appears as a sole owner of one of four companies set up by his business partner Assaf Halkin. The company, Talaville Global, was registered in the British Virgin Islands in May 2012, according to Haaretz, and seven months later, all of its shares were mortgaged against a loan from a Vienna bank.

Weissglass and Halkin told Haaretz that the company "was registered for the purpose of receiving a loan from the bank in order to invest in European properties. The bank would only allow a loan to a corporation... [the] company activity is reported to the tax authorities in Israel. The required tax on the said activity is paid in Israel."

=== Italy ===
On April 6, 2016 Italy's Procura of Turin ordered Guardia di Finanza to further investigate the 800 Italians contained in the Panama Paper's documents.

=== Mexico ===
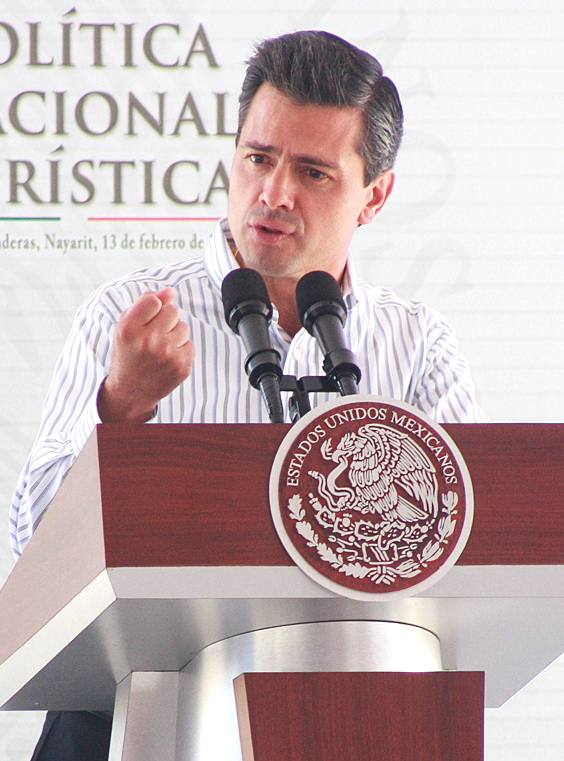
The leaked files identified "favorite" contractor of Mexican President Enrique Peña Nieto

Aristóteles Núñez, who is in charge of the government's tax administration, Servicio de Administración Tributaria, said that people involved in the Panama Papers case can still make tax declarations and pay taxes on their investments. Being Mexican and having foreign investments or bank accounts is not a crime, but having income and not declaring it is illegal. If the concealment of income from Panama Papers-related investments is categorized as tax evasion, fines of up to 100% of the omitted tax payment can result, as well as three months to nine years imprisonment for a "tax crime".

According to Forbes, "Hinojosa and other prominent Mexicans, mostly businessmen with close ties to the government, including at least one member of the Forbes billionaires list, were the subject of extensive articles published on line by Proceso and Aristegui Noticias Sunday to coincide with the ICIJ posting of the Panama Papers."

=== New Zealand ===
New Zealand's Inland Revenue Department said that they were working to obtain details of people who have tax residence in the country who may have been involved in arrangements facilitated by Mossack Fonseca.

Gerard Ryle, director of the International Consortium of Investigative Journalists, told Radio New Zealand on April 8, 2016 that New Zealand is a well-known tax haven and a "nice front for criminals".

=== Norway ===
The Norwegian Tax Administration expects to demand access to information from DNB (Norway's largest financial services group) about approximately 30 companies formed by DNB that are owned by Norwegians, 20 of whom are living in Norway. 200 Norwegians are on the client list of Mossack Fonseca.

=== Pakistan ===
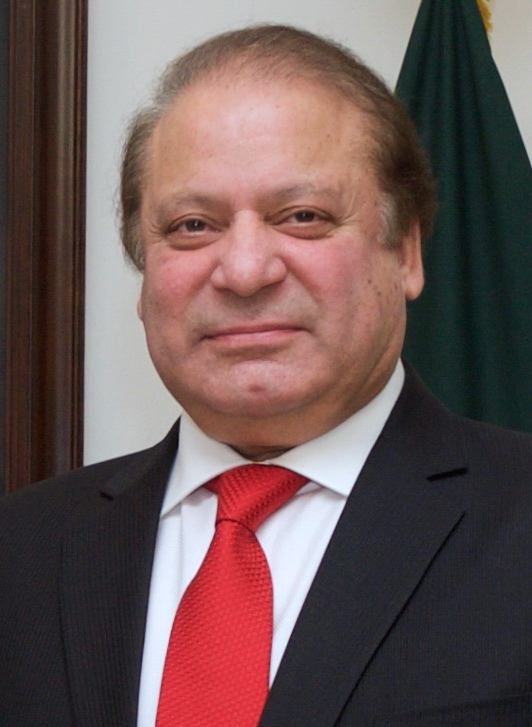
Nawaz Sharif – Prime Minister of Pakistan

The three children of prime minister Nawaz Sharif, Maryam, Hussein and Hassan, are shown as owning four companies among them. Maryam Nawaz denied all such charges via her official Twitter account in a series of tweets, saying:

As stated earlier, I do NOT own any company/property abroad. My brother has made me a trustee in one of his corporations which only entitles me to distribute assets to my brother Hussain's family/children if needed. Nothing more than what my brother has already explained. The info provided by leaks does NOT say any wrongdoing involved. Distortion is wilful that a couple of media channels using to settle scores.

Samina Durrani, the mother-in-law of chief minister Shebaz Sharif from his second marriage and Ilyas Mehraj, his brother-in-law from his first marriage are also included in the documents.

The leaks resulted in a high-profile case against the prime minister, Nawaz Sharif, in the Supreme Court of Pakistan which returned a 3-2 verdict in favor of further investigation into the Sharif family's businesses. A Joint investigation Team was formed by the Supreme Court in May 2017 to probe the family's assets in this regard. It will have to render its report before the court within 60 days of its first session.

On July 28, 2017, as per results of the investigation, Supreme Court of Pakistan disqualified the Prime Minister of Pakistan from holding the public office also permanently disqualified and corruption case referred to NAB of Pakistan

=== Panama ===
The Procuraduría de la Nación announced that it will open an investigation concerning the international journalistic investigation "Panama papers", where Mossack Fonseca is involved. Minister of the Presidency, Alvaro Alemán categorically rejects that Panama is considered a tax haven and ruled that no permit is used the country as a "scapegoat", thus reacting to the scandal "Panama Papers" and the subsequent re-registration by France in the list of tax havens. Alemán criticized vigorously the statements made by the Secretary General of the Organisation for Economic Co-operation and Development (OECD) José Ángel Gurría and Minister of Finance of France, Michael Sapin and considered as disrespectful and irresponsible, especially when publications speak of a total of 21 jurisdictions, but only lash out at Panama. Alemán explained that talks have started with the French ambassador in Panama, with whom the issue will be discussed preliminarily and establish avenues of understanding to clarify the situation being implicated the country. Eduardo Morgan, from the Panamanian firm Morgan & Morgan accuses the OECD of being behind the campaign to avoid competition that Panama represents for the interests of other countries. The Panama Papers are a very serious issue for Panama because it affects in an "unfair" manner the country's image and is not the result of an investigation, but is a "hack". This was stated on April 5, by Adolfo Linares, president of the Chamber of Commerce, Industries and Agriculture of Panama (Cciap). The Colegio Nacional de Abogados de Panama (CNA) urged the Panamanian government to sue anyone who has affected the country's image with the massive leak of documents linking the Panamanian firm Mossack Fonseca with the creation of companies to move capital evading taxes. Political analyst Mario Rognoni said that Panama is the most affected in the whole scandal 'Panama Papers'. He said the world is pointing to Panama as a tax haven and will depend on the policies adopted by the authorities. On the government of President Juan Carlos Varela, he believes he might be involved if he tries to cover up the responsibility of those involved. Economist Rolando Gordon said this hurts the country that has just emerged from the gray list of FATF. The US could ask Panama to modify the law, he said. He explained that at this time is seen as a scandal, but will each country, especially Panama to conduct investigations and determine whether it is true that illegal or improper acts were committed. Panama's Lawyers Movement listed as a 'cyber bullying or international cyberterrorism' scandal called 'Panama Papers'. In a press conference, the guild primarily condemned the attack on the country brand 'Panama'. Fraguela Alfonso, president of the movement, said there is no doubt that this is a direct attack on the country's financial system.'I invite all organized forces of the country to create a great crusade for the rescue of the country's image, "he said.He said that Panama is not a tax haven and Panamanian corporations are widely used by the Panamanians.The law firm Rubio, Alvarez, Solis & Abrego also reacted and in a press release detailing that "in recent decades Panama has been in the financial and most important services in Latin America and the world plazas. Product of it all kinds of attacks on our service system 'are encouraged.' The establishment of an offshore company is legal. The lawyer and excontralor of the Republic Alvin Weeden explained that its illegal when the product created or sold to others is used for money laundering or arms smuggling, terrorism, and tax evasion. This case was published on Twitter: 'Its like you create an atomic bomb, you sell it to another country and detonate them in another country'.

=== Russia ===
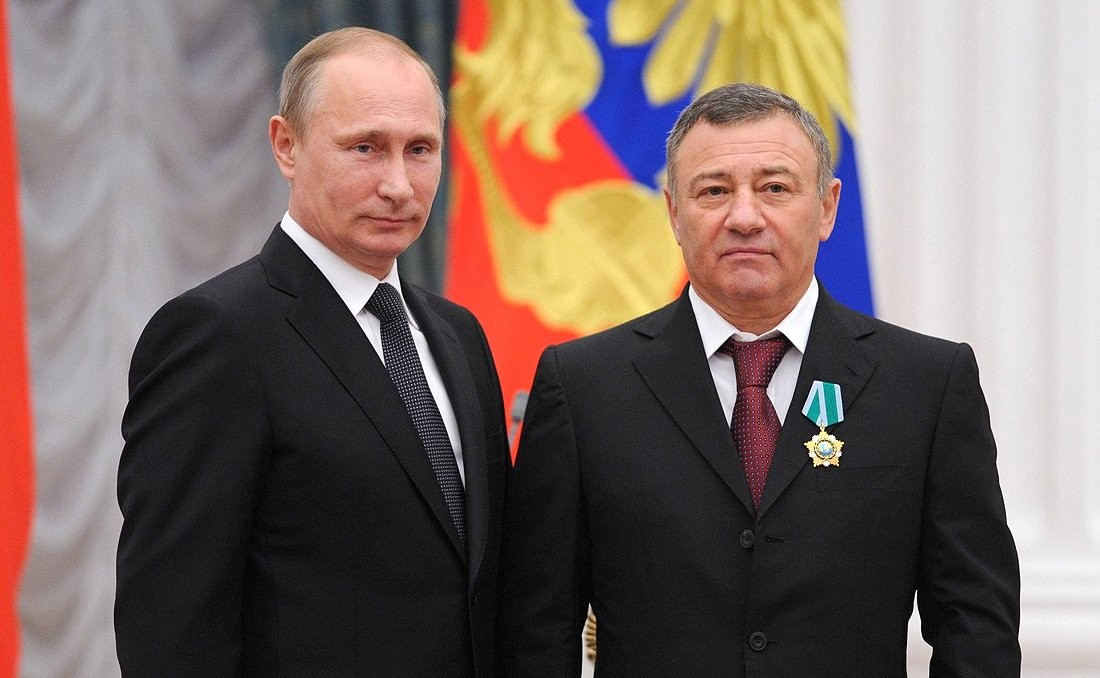
Russian President Vladimir Putin with Russian businessman and oligarch Arkady Rotenberg

The Süddeutsche Zeitung, which made the papers public, has described the connections of various individuals listed in the papers to Russian President Vladimir Putin. According to the newspaper, the release of the papers confirms the previous descriptions of Russia as a kleptocratic "Mafia state" run by Putin and his inner circle. Vladimir Putin does not appear in any of the records but the names of many of his associates do, such as construction billionaires Arkady and Boris Rotenberg, as well as the professional musician Sergei Roldugin and business magnate Alisher Usmanov. The papers also list billionaire Gennady Timchenko, Putin's press secretary's spouse, his cousin, Putin's former KGB colleagues, and several oligarchs as owning offshore shell companies. In 2011 Putin had criticized offshore companies as "unpatriotic".

The documents leaked indicated that Sergei Roldugin, a professional cellist described by Novaya Gazeta as Vladimir Putin's best friend and the godfather of his eldest daughter, had acquired assets worth at least $100 million, including a 12.5% stake in Video International, Russia's largest television advertising firm. It was also revealed that Roldugin had acquired these assets in what the BBC described as "suspicious deals".

Putin spokesperson Dmitry Peskov said that Western mainstream media reporting of the Panama Papers was engaged in "Putinophobia". He said the primary target of the leak was Vladimir Putin and the Panama Papers were part of a conspiracy against Russia, orchestrated by the Central Intelligence Agency, the United States Department of State and others.

President Putin has denied "any element of corruption" over the Panama Papers leaks, saying his opponents are trying to destabilise Russia.

Initially, aside from few independent outlets, Russian media entirely ignored the leak. Channel 1 and Rossiya 1, both state owned, did not mention the Panama Papers at all on April 4, when the story broke. When an opposition politician asked why the media was ignoring the story, Dmitry Kiselev, head of Rossiya Segodnya, refused to discuss or comment. To the extent that some coverage was given to the story it was often done in the middle of the night, and focused exclusively on international celebrities rather than the links to Putin's circles found in the papers. Coverage of the leak began to appear after Peskov's reaction, but generally focused on Peskov's comments rather than discussing the information in the Panama Papers.

=== Saudi Arabia ===
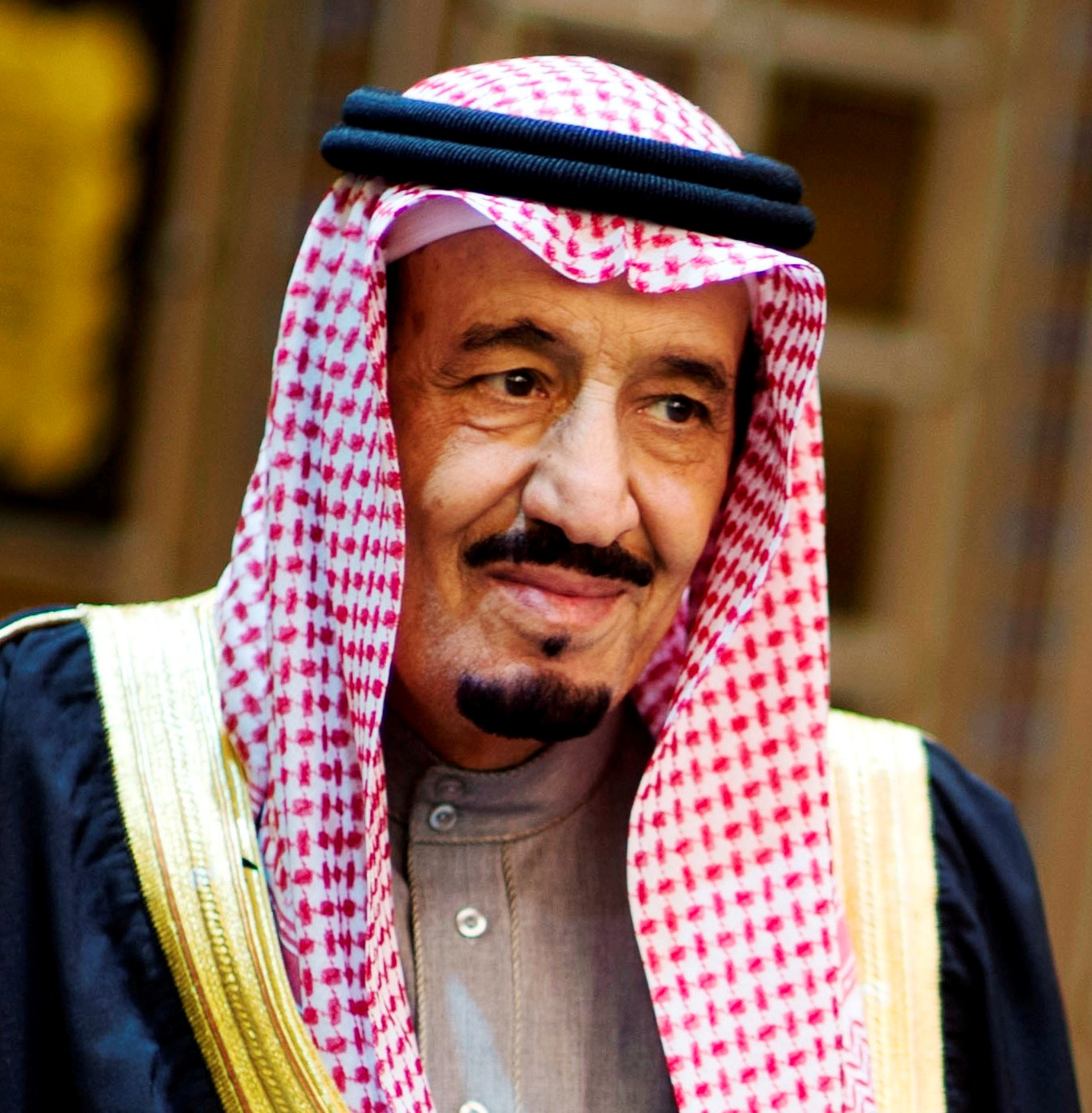
King Salman of Saudi Arabia

The Crown Prince Muhammad bin Nayef has also been named in association with the Papers.

=== Singapore ===
The Ministry of Finance and Monetary Authority of Singapore said in a statement that "Singapore takes a serious view on tax evasion and will not tolerate its business and financial centre being used to facilitate tax related crimes. If there is evidence of wrongdoing by any individual or entity in Singapore, we will not hesitate to take firm action."

=== Sweden ===
The Swedish Financial Supervisory Authority (FI) said on April 4, 2016 it would launch an investigation into the actions of Nordea, one of the largest financial institutions in the Nordic countries, after Panama Papers revealed the company's Luxembourg office had helped to set up nearly 400 offshore companies for its clients. Later FI informed that they will investigate also the other three big banks in Sweden: Handelsbanken, SEB and Swedbank.

Nordea cut all ties with Mossack Fonseca following an interview with Nordea CEO Casper von Koskull on SVT on April 4. The FI has pointed out that there are "serious deficiencies" in how Nordea monitors money laundering and has given the bank two warnings. In 2015 Nordea had to pay the largest possible fine – over 5 million EUR.

=== Thailand ===
The Bangkok Post said that the "...Anti-Money Laundering Office (AMLO) is seeking information from its foreign counterparts regarding twenty-one Thai nationals reportedly included in a list of people worldwide using a Panama-based law firm apparently specializing in money laundering and tax evasion. It is not clear how or why AMLO is investigating only twenty one. The Panama Papers include at least 780 names of individuals based in Thailand and another fifty companies based in Thailand. Some are foreigners or foreign-owned companies but 634 individual addresses in Thailand appear in the documents that have surfaced to date, including the CEOs of giant companies Bangkok Land and Phatra Finance.

=== Tunisia ===
The Tunis trial court prosecutor ordered a judicial inquiry opened into the Panama Papers and the Tunisian political figures suspected of hiring the firm. A judge from the Financial Judiciary Pole that is a Tunisian specialized court in financial crimes was assigned to the case. The Tunisian Assembly of the Representatives of the People established a parliamentary commission of inquiry as well

=== Ukraine ===
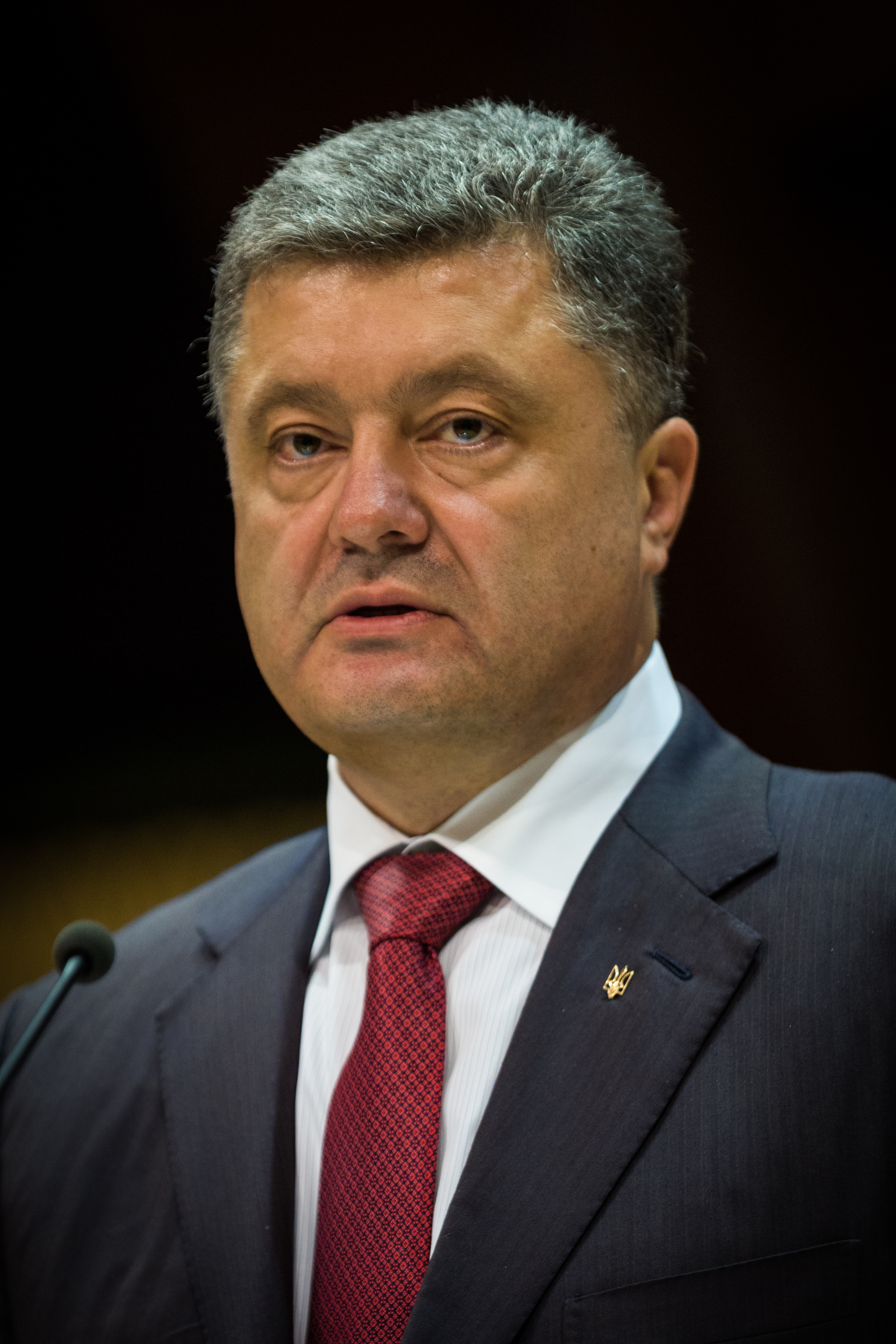
Ukrainian President Petro Poroshenko

When Ukrainian President Petro Poroshenko ran for office in 2014, he pledged to sell his candy business (Roshen) if elected, but leaked documents indicate that on August 21, 2014 he instead had Mossack Fonseca set up offshore holding company Prime Asset Partners Ltd in the British Virgin Islands and moved his company there, roughly two months after the election. The move had the potential to save him millions of dollars on his Ukrainian taxes. Records in Cyprus show him as the firm's only shareholder.

Anti-corruption group Transparency International believes that the "creation of businesses while serving as president is a direct violation of the constitution". Also, journalists from the Organized Crime and Corruption Reporting Project believe that with the move Poroshenko committed two other illegalities, starting a new business while in office and failing afterwards to report it on his disclosure statements.

Poroshenko denied any wrongdoing and a spokesman said the offshore company had no active assets and was a legitimate corporate restructure aimed at helping to sell Poroshenko's Roshen group. Analysts in Ukraine responded that the secretive way Poroshenko set up these accounts was certain to undermine trust in him, his party and Ukraine itself.

The news about Poroshenko's offshore business came as his government campaigned against offshore companies. Oleh Lyashko, leader of the Radical Party, urged lawmakers to begin impeachment proceedings, And even some of his allies backed calls for a parliamentary commission to investigate the allegations.

In the Ukrainian Parliament, relations between the Poroshenko bloc and the People's Front party of Prime Minister Arseniy Yatsenyuk had over previous months already soured, with mutual accusations of corruption.

The allegations threw gasoline on long-running allegations of corruption and impropriety on Poroshenko's behalf, which are thought to be a large reason, although not the chief one, why Poroshenko lost his reelection bid.

=== United Arab Emirates ===
ICIJ, The Guardian and The Independent have reported that UAE President Khalifa bin Zayed Al Nahyan owns London real estate worth more than £1.2 billion through a structure of some thirty shell companies Mossack Fonseca set up for him in the British Virgin Islands and administer for him, using them to manage and control the luxury properties in London. By December 2015, Mossack Fonseca held nearly all of the shares in those companies in trust structures on his behalf, with the President and his wife, son and daughter the trust beneficiaries.

=== United Kingdom ===
The Leader of the Opposition has called for an immediate independent investigation into the tax affairs of the family of then-Prime Minister of the United Kingdom, David Cameron (pictured).

According to The Guardian, "More than £170bn of UK property is now held overseas. ... Nearly one in 10 of the 31,000 tax haven companies that own British property are linked to Mossack Fonseca." British property purchases worth more than £180 million were investigated in 2015 as the likely proceeds of corruption — almost all bought through offshore companies. Two-thirds of the purchases were made by companies registered in four British Overseas Territories and Crown dependencies which operate as tax havens – Jersey, Guernsey, the Isle of Man and the British Virgin Islands (BVI) – according to Land Registry data obtained by Private Eye magazine through freedom of information requests. The seller's market has sent prices skyrocketing out of reach for many Londoners.

Included among the Papers are the names of six members of the House of Lords, several of whom have been donors to Cameron's Conservative Party, and other Conservative donors. This included:

- Anthony Bamford: £4 million in Conservative Party donations, made a Conservative life peer in 2013;
- David Rowland: £3.8 million in Conservative Party donations, former party treasurer;
- Fleming Family & Partners: Over £400,000 in Conservative Party donations, including direct donations to David Cameron;
- Juniper Equities Trading: £250,000 loan to the Conservative Party from an offshore fund with an opaque ownership structure;
- Tony Buckingham: £100,000 donation to the Conservative Party.

As the United Kingdom still exercises varying degrees of control over British Overseas Territories and Crown dependencies which make up a large number of the many tax havens and "secrecy jurisdictions" that exist, pressure has mounted on Prime Minister David Cameron to make changes. According to the Wall Street Journal, the Panama Papers "are shining a light on the constellation of offshore centers in the last remnants of the British Empire, from Gibraltar to the British Virgin Islands." Of the companies handled by Mossack Fonseca which were included in the leaked data, British Overseas Territory the BVI topped the list, with 113,000 of the nearly 215,000 companies that Mossack Fonseca managed incorporated there. British Overseas Territory Anguilla was 7th on the list.

Cameron criticized complex offshore structures in 2012, saying that it is "not fair and not right", while at the G8 summit in 2013 he demanded more transparency, saying that it would be better for business. In 2014, Cameron asked all Overseas Territories and Crown dependencies to set-up an open register of firms and individuals with investments registered in their jurisdictions, but by the time of the Panama Papers leak in April 2016, only Montserrat and Gibraltar had agreed to do so.

Leader of the Opposition Jeremy Corbyn, said "The government needs to stop pussyfooting around on tax dodging" and called for "direct rule" to be imposed over British Overseas Territories and Crown dependencies that act as tax havens, a move former Business Secretary Vince Cable agreed with, although former attorney general Dominic Grieve described it as a "bit of a nuclear option" which would "destroy the livelihoods" of BVI inhabitants in the finance industry. The Labour Party also said that Cameron's plans for an "anti-corruption" summit in May would be "a charade" if Cameron, as chairman of the summit, did not require representatives of all Crown dependencies and overseas territories to attend.

Jennie Granger, a spokeswoman for HMRC said that the department had received "a great deal of information on offshore companies, including in Panama, from a wide range of sources, which is currently the subject of intensive investigation". She said HMRC had asked ICIJ to share all its data. Private Eye and The Guardian revealed that Edward Troup, appointed executive chair of HMRC in April 2016, was a former partner with Simmons & Simmons, the London-based legal firm whose clients included the Panama-registered fund created by David Cameron's father, Blairmore Holdings. Papers obtained by the Süddeutsche Zeitung and ICIJ reveal Simmons & Simmons' close relationship with running offshore companies and major overseas property owners, including an investment company run on behalf of Sheikh Hamad bin Abdullah Al Thani, while Troup was its senior tax partner.

By November 2016 it was reported that a total of 22 people had been subjected to investigation by HMRC relating to potential tax evasion as a result of the Panama Papers, with a further 43 "under review".

==== Blairmore Holdings, Inc. ====
Ian Cameron, the late father of UK Prime Minister David Cameron, ran an offshore fund (Blairmore Holdings, Inc.) through Mossack Fonseca that avoided UK taxes for 30 years. His company moved to Ireland after David Cameron became prime minister. On April 6, Cameron admitted that he owned shares in Blairmore, but sold his shares before becoming PM.

Prominent politicians criticized the involvement of the Cameron family in the scandal; Leader of the Opposition Jeremy Corbyn urged an immediate independent investigation into the tax affairs of Cameron's family as well as tighter laws on UK tax avoidance. Opponents also called for Cameron's resignation after he admitted owning shares in Blairmore.

=== United States ===
President Barack Obama was critical of Caribbean tax havens in his 2008 election campaign. In 2010, the United States implemented the Foreign Account Tax Compliance Act; the law required financial firms around the world to report accounts held by US citizens to the Internal Revenue Service.

Former Secretary of State and Democratic Presidential front-runner Hillary Clinton condemned "outrageous tax havens and loopholes ... in Panama and elsewhere". at a Pennsylvania AFL–CIO event. Clinton added that "some of this behavior is clearly against the law, and everyone who violates the law anywhere should be held accountable", but it was "scandalous how much is actually legal". Clinton promised that "We are going after all these scams and make sure everyone pays their fair share here in America."

The US on the other hand refused the Common Reporting Standard set up by the Organisation for Economic Co-operation and Development, alongside Vanuatu and Bahrain. This means the US receives tax and asset information for American assets and income abroad, but does not share information about what happens in the United States with other countries, in other words has become attractive as a tax haven.

==== Panama Free Trade Agreement ====
The Panama Free Trade Agreement, supported by Obama and Clinton, has been accused of enabling the practices detailed within the Panama Papers through regulatory oversight. However, an Obama administration official said the argument has "zero merit". John Cassidy of The New Yorker says the Panama Free Trade Agreement actually forced Panama to release information to the American regulatory authorities on "the ownership of companies, partnerships, trusts, foundations, and other persons".

Citing leaked diplomatic cables, Fortune writer Chris Matthews speculated that Obama and Clinton may have supported the agreement, after opposing it while campaigning for office, because it was a quid pro quo for Panamanian support of US efforts against drug trafficking. In any event, he notes, while it is true that the agreement abolished limits on fund transfers between the US and Panama, the Obama administration insisted that the two countries first sign a Tax Information and Exchange Agreement as well, which facilitated the exchange of tax information between the countries.

==== After the leak ====
President Barack Obama addressed the overseas shell companies listed by the leak in a press conference: "It's not that they're breaking the laws," he said, "it's that the laws are so poorly designed that they allow people, if they've got enough lawyers and enough accountants, to wiggle out of responsibilities that ordinary citizens are having to abide by." Although no leader in the US was mentioned in the Panama Papers, Obama said that "Frankly, folks in America are taking advantage of the same stuff".

Senators Sherrod Brown and Elizabeth Warren have requested that the Treasury Department investigate any US-linked companies that appeared in the leaks, and members of the House of Representatives for the state of New York (Democratic representative Carolyn Maloney – a high-ranking member of the House Banking Committee – and Republican representative Peter T. King) have introduced the Incorporation Transparency and Law Enforcement Assistance Act, a proposed bill which would:

...ensure that persons who form corporations or limited liability companies in the United States disclose the beneficial owners of those corporations or limited liability companies, in order to prevent wrongdoers from exploiting United States corporations and limited liability companies for criminal gain, to assist law enforcement in detecting, preventing, and punishing terrorism, money laundering, and other misconduct involving United States corporations and limited liability companies, and for other purposes.

According to the Fair Observer: "The law contains many reasonable exemptions, including public corporations (who already have registers of beneficial owners); churches and other non-profits; and owners of businesses with more than 20 employees, $5 million in annual revenues and a physical presence such as an office." However, the bill has faced resistance from the National Association of Secretaries of State, who are concerned about loss of tax revenue and the burden of regulation. NASS has also called for "existing solutions" being used to combat the issue, saying that "federal legislation won't work".

Jürgen Mossack testified under oath that M.F. Corporate Services (Nevada) Ltd. had no affiliation with the Panamanian Mossack Fonseca, but the Panama Papers show that it was in fact a wholly owned subsidiary and tried to hide the relationship, ordering emails and other computer footprints deleted. The firm was fighting an order that it turn over the details of 123 shell companies created by an associate of a former President of Argentina.

Manhattan US Attorney Preet Bharara has opened a criminal investigation on matters related to the Panama Papers and sent a letter April 3 to the International Consortium of Investigative Journalists (ICIJ) saying his office "would greatly appreciate the opportunity to speak as soon as possible." The ICIJ received many such requests from many countries and ICIJ Director Gerard Ryle has said its policy is not to turn over any materials.

==== Americans ====
McClatchy Newspapers, the only participating US news organization in the investigation, found four Americans with offshore shell companies named in the documents. All had previously been either accused or convicted of financial crimes such as fraud or tax evasion. Three reasons have been suggested to explain the paucity of Americans in the leak:

- Shell companies can be created in the United States,
- major international banks based in America tend to have offshore accounts in the Cayman Islands instead
- US laws like the Foreign Account Tax Compliance Act (FATCA) and the Tax Information Exchange Agreements (TIEAs) of 2010 have meant that the "tax evasion game [was] principally over for American taxpayers."

Asked about the paucity of American individuals in the documents, digital editor of Süddeutsche Zeitung, Stefan Plöchinger, said via Twitter: "Just wait for what is coming next." Plöchinger later clarified that he was just advocating not jumping to conclusions.

New York's Department of Financial Services has asked 13 foreign banks, including Deutsche Bank AG, Credit Suisse Group AG, Commerzbank AG, ABN Amro Group NV and Societe Generale SA, for information about their dealings with Mossack Fonseca. The banks are not accused of wrongdoing but must provide telephone logs and records of other transactions between their New York branches and the law firm.

Copies of at least 200 American passports – indicating that their owners applied for banking services – have been discovered in the Papers, but no US politicians have yet been named in the leak.

The names of a few Americans are however mentioned:

- Puerto Rican recording artist Ramón Luis Ayala, better known as Daddy Yankee, appears in the leaked documents.
- CEO and then Chairman of Citibank (1998-2006) Sanford Weill appears in the documents as sole shareholder of April Fool, a company based in the British Virgin Islands that managed a yacht of the same name 2001-2005. Weill's second company, Brightao, includes Chinese and American investors and holds share in a Chinese insurance and risk-management firm, Mingya Insurance Brokers.
- Jerry Slusser, a fundraiser for Republican Mitt Romney, initially said he did not recall opening an offshore company, but then called his accountant and said it was for an investment in Hong Kong that eventually showed a loss. He declined to provide further detail.
- Numerous donors to the Clinton Foundation, including many foreign nationals.

=== Venezuela ===
Josmel Velásquez, brother of a security official under the late Hugo Chávez, was arrested April 15 trying to catch a flight out of the country due to an offshore company revealed by the Panama Papers. His mother Amelis Figueroa was also arrested, but allowed to return home due to her health. Venezuelan news site Armando.info reported that Josmel's brother Adrian, a former aide to late President Hugo Chávez, had opened a shell company though Mossack Fonseca in the Republic of the Seychelles with a $50,000 deposit. Their report was based on the documents leaked from Panamanian law firm Mossack Fonseca. Velásquez was Indicted April 20.

== WikiLeaks ==
Icelandic investigative journalist and WikiLeaks spokesperson Kristinn Hrafnsson has called for the Panama Papers to be published in full online. Hrafnsson, who worked on Cablegate in 2010, said the withholding of documents is understandable to maximise the impact, but said that in the end the papers should be published in full for the public to access. Hrafnsson's comments were reinforced by a tweet from WikiLeaks which criticized the decision of the ICIJ to not allow full and transparent access to the Panama Papers, stating that, "If you censor more than 99% of the documents you are engaged in 1% journalism by definition." WikiLeaks' position was, in turn, criticized, as the decision to disclose the documents at once would not have been the right one as far as "journalistic ethics" were concerned. WikiLeaks also argued via a tweet that the connection between the International Consortium of Investigative Journalists and the American government would undermine the integrity of the news leak; this position was also, in turn, criticized as a theory which "Vladimir Putin would love."
