= Endara =

Endara is a surname. Notable people with the surname include:

- Guillermo Endara (1936–2009), Panamanian politician
- Guido J. Martinelli Endara (fl. 1981), Panamanian businessman
- Iván Endara (b. 1988), Ecuadorian tennis player

== See also ==
- Gonzalo Endara Crow (1936–1996), Ecuadorian writer and painter
