= The Laundromat (2019 film) =

2019 film by Steven Soderbergh

- Release poster
- Directed by: Steven Soderbergh
- Screenplay by: Scott Z. Burns
- Based on: Secrecy World: Inside the Panama Papers Investigation of Illicit Money Networks and the Global Elite by Jake Bernstein
- Produced by: Scott Z. Burns; Lawrence Grey; Gregory Jacobs; Michael Sugar
- Starring: Meryl Streep; Gary Oldman; Antonio Banderas; Jeffrey Wright; Robert Patrick; David Schwimmer; Rosalind Chao; Sharon Stone
- Cinematography: Peter Andrews
- Edited by: Mary Ann Bernard
- Music by: David Holmes
- Production companies: Anonymous Content; Grey Matter Productions; Topic Studios; Sugar23
- Distributed by: Netflix
- Release dates: September 1, 2019 (Venice); September 27, 2019 (United States); October 18, 2019 (Netflix)
- Running time: 95 minutes
- Country: United States
- Language: English

The Laundromat is a 2019 American comedy-drama film directed by Steven Soderbergh with a screenplay by Scott Z. Burns. It is based on the book Secrecy World about the Panama Papers scandal by author Jake Bernstein. The film stars Meryl Streep, Gary Oldman, Antonio Banderas, Robert Patrick, Jeffrey Wright, David Schwimmer, Matthias Schoenaerts, James Cromwell, and Sharon Stone.

The Laundromat had its world premiere at the 76th Venice International Film Festival on September 1, 2019, and was released in select theaters in the United States on September 27, 2019, before its streaming release on October 18, 2019, by Netflix. The film received mixed reviews from critics.

== Plot ==
Lawyers Jürgen Mossack and Ramón Fonseca introduce themselves, along with the concept of money and credit. The pair serve as narrators for three stories of people around the world who are adversely affected by the machinations of their company, Mossack Fonseca. While the story has been somewhat fictionalized, the names of the law firm at the center of the scandal, along with those of its founders, were not. Neither were the names and roles of individuals involved in the Wang Lijun incident changed.

Ellen Martin and her husband Joe are on a pleasure boat, the Ethan Allen on Lake George, New York, when it capsizes, drowning Joe and many others. When Ellen tries to get compensation from the boating company for Joe's death, she cannot because the reinsurance company that the boat company's owner and son Matthew bought their policy from, was sold to another company based out of Nevis. The Nevis-based company is actually a trust of one of Mossack's shell corporations, which is under investigation by the Internal Revenue Service (IRS) for fraud.

When her attempts to contact Mossack and the Nevis-based company are unsuccessful, Ellen travels there to confront Malchus Boncamper, the manager of the trust. When Ellen bumps into him, not knowing who he is, she asks questions about his firm's location. Malchus lies and walks away. When he then travels to Miami he is arrested by IRS-CI Special Agents at the airport.

The second story is about Simone, the daughter of Charles, an African billionaire. When she discovers her best friend is having an affair with him, he offers her shares (supposedly worth $20 million) in one of his investment companies to keep her silence. Simone accepts his offer, but when she travels to Mossack's offices in Panama City to claim the shares, they turn out to be worthless because the company was owned by another Mossack shell (itself presumably owned by Charles) that had recently emptied the company's bank account.

The third story is a dramatization of the death of Neil Heywood, part of the Wang Lijun incident. Heywood (renamed "Maywood" in the film), is an intermediary for wealthy Chinese looking to funnel money abroad. He visits a Chongqing hotel to meet Gu Kailai. Maywood demands and pressures her for a much higher price if she wants him to continue laundering money for her family through his shell company. Gu responds by poisoning Maywood's drink.

Gu discloses the incident and reports Maywood to Chongqing police chief Wang Lijun (Ming Lo at IMDb) who secretly records the conversation; he then reports her to the Chinese government. The story ends with the arrest of Gu and her husband Bo Xilai for Maywood's murder and for corruption.

The film ends with the leaking of the Panama Papers and subsequent police raids on Mossack Fonseca, the brief imprisonment of them both, and the shutdown of the firm. Mossack and Fonseca, along with Meryl Streep as herself, then remind viewers that many such companies still exist, and the practice of money laundering and corruption using fake trusts and shell companies based in tax havens is still widespread. Streep closes the film with a statement about the immediate need for campaign finance reforms in the US before adopting the Statue of Liberty's pose.

== Cast ==
- Meryl Streep as Ellen Martin / Elena / Herself
- Gary Oldman as Jürgen Mossack
- Antonio Banderas as Ramón Fonseca
- Sharon Stone as Hannah
- David Schwimmer as Matthew Quirk
- Matthias Schoenaerts as Maywood
- Jeffrey Wright as Malchus Irvin Boncamper
- Will Forte as Doomed Gringo #1
- Chris Parnell as Doomed Gringo #2
- James Cromwell as Joseph David "Joe" Martin
- Melissa Rauch as Melanie Martin
- Larry Wilmore as Jeff
- Robert Patrick as Captain Richard Paris
- Rosalind Chao as Gu Kailai
- Ming Lo as Police Chief Wang Lijun
- Jesse Wang as Bo Xilai
- Nikki Amuka-Bird as Miranda
- Nonso Anozie as Charles
- Jessica Allain as Simone
- Amy Pemberton as Fetching
- Cristela Alonzo as IRS-CI Special Agent Kilmer
- Jay Paulson as Pastor Conners
- Charles Halford as Pyro Guy (uncredited)
- Shoshana Bush as Rebecca Rubinstein
- Norbert Weisser as Swiss Skier
- Juliet Donenfeld as Thalia
- Marsha Stephanie Blake as Vincelle Boncamper
- Veronica Osorio as Maria
- David P. Weber as Panamanian Reporter #1

== Theme ==
In a 2019 interview with Risa Sarachan in Forbes, Steven Soderbergh described his goal for the take away from this film: "... my response is two-fold. One, well, in terms of policy you might want to think about supporting people who believe this is an issue that needs to be addressed. And do a little dive into how they think it should be addressed. Part two is to look around you and realize to what extent we are all touched by it. Whenever you think about, well, who owns this block? Who owns the real estate in my neighborhood? Who owns the real estate where I go shopping? It's sort of like the dark matter of our socio-economic life, these companies that behave like this. This is everywhere, and just being aware of it - I think if you're being inoculated to think that way or look at things that way, that's better than being oblivious or ignorant."

== Production ==
In July 2016, it was announced that Steven Soderbergh would produce a then-untitled Panama Papers project. Later, in April 2018, it was announced that Soderbergh would also direct the film, now titled The Laundromat. Scott Z. Burns wrote the screenplay and production was set to commence in the fall of 2018. In May 2018, it was reported that Meryl Streep, Gary Oldman and Antonio Banderas were in talks to star in the film, with Netflix interested in acquiring the distribution rights. Soderbergh affirmed that Netflix would likely be the film's distributor in July. In October, Netflix was confirmed to be releasing the movie, with David Schwimmer and Will Forte added to the cast. That same month, Matthias Schoenaerts, Jeffrey Wright, Chris Parnell, James Cromwell, Melissa Rauch, Larry Wilmore and Robert Patrick joined the cast.

=== Filming ===
Principal photography began on October 15, 2018.

== Release ==
The Laundromat had its world premiere at the 76th Venice International Film Festival on September 1, 2019. It also screened at the Toronto International Film Festival and the 67th San Sebastián International Film Festival in September 2019. It was released in select theaters in the United States on September 27, 2019, before being released for digital streaming on October 18, 2019, by Netflix.

== Reception ==
=== Critical response ===
On the review aggregator website Rotten Tomatoes, the film holds an approval of 41% based on 177 reviews, with an average rating of 5.4/10. The website's critics consensus reads, "The Laundromat misuses its incredible cast by taking a disappointingly blunt and unfocused approach to dramatizing the real-life events that inspired it." Based on 37 critics on Metacritic, the film's weighted average score is 57 out of 100, indicating "mixed or average" reviews.

Todd McCarthy of The Hollywood Reporter wrote: "there's a kind of off-putting effrontery about Soderbergh's approach here that rather sours the whole experience. The tone is brittle, the attitude arch, the performances by a savvy and diverse cast uneven." Richard Roeper of the Chicago Sun-Times called it "a muddled, meandering, hit-and-miss social satire and political commentary that's too heavy on the latter category and often lacking in the former." Alonso Duralde of TheWrap wrote: "The Laundromat flails about, with an excess of bad ideas that undercut the justifiable outrage over the events depicted." Owen Gleiberman of Variety gave it a positive review and wrote: "The Laundromat is Soderbergh at his most playful, and also Soderbergh at his most wonkish, and damned, in this case, if the two don't chime together." A.O. Scott of The New York Times wrote: "Soderbergh and his top-notch cast (Sharon Stone shows up, as do Jeffrey Wright and Matthias Schoenaerts) keep things lively, playing out parables of betrayal and deception with pulpy, TV-movie flair."

=== Accolades ===
Award	Date of ceremony	Category	Recipient(s)	Result	Ref.
California on Location Awards	December 15, 2019	Location Team of the Year - Independent Feature Film	Ken Lavet, Leslie Thorson, Rachel Nelson, Anna L. Coats, Lee, Matthew Bolin, Lee David, Peter Cubas, Neil Dave	Nominated	
Cinema for Peace Awards	May 7, 2019	Most Valuable Movie of the Year	The Laundromat	Nominated	
Costume Designers Guild Awards	January 28, 2020	Excellence in Contemporary Film	Ellen Mirojnick	Nominated	
Make-Up Artists and Hair Stylists Guild	January 11, 2020	Best Contemporary Hair Styling in a Motion Picture	Marie Larkin, Yvette Stone and J. Roy Helland	Nominated	
San Sebastián International Film Festival	2020	City of Donostia Audience Award	Steven Soderbergh	Nominated	
St. Louis Film Critics Association	December 15, 2019	Worst Film of the Year	The Laundromat	Nominated	
Venice Film Festival	September 7, 2019	Golden Lion	The Laundromat	Nominated	

== Controversy ==
The film was criticized for its use of brownface, casting Streep in a secondary role as a Panamanian woman called Elena. Soderbergh acknowledged the controversy, but felt that in the context of the story the dual role was justifiable. He also felt that as a comedy trope it was acceptable and compared it to Oldman's impression of a German person, and that there are different rules for comedy.

On October 16, 2019, weeks after its limited theatrical release and just two days before its scheduled streaming release, the two Mossack Fonseca law firm partners at the center of the film, Jürgen Mossack and Ramón Fonseca, sued Netflix in an attempt to block the film's release. They argued the film defamed them. Netflix responded the next day, calling the suit "laughable," and argued the film was "constitutionally protected speech." A Connecticut judge denied the injunction and moved the case to California, allowing the film to be released as planned. The Panamanian government also expressed strong objections to the film's release. In December 2019, a U.S. District Court Judge ruled that the film did not defame Mossack and Fonseca; and was protected under the First Amendment to the United States Constitution as free speech. Panama's vice president José Gabriel Carrizo pledged that Panama would do everything in its power to "fix" the country's image worldwide.
