= Operation virus =

2012 French money laundering investigation

Operation Virus was a police investigation started in 2012 to break up an international money laundering network connected to drug trafficking. It was led by the Anti-Money Laundering unit of France’s Central Office for the Repression of Major Financial Crime (OCRGDF). During the operation, over €18 million was seized by investigators, and the tax authorities recovered another €100 million. More than €1 billion was found in bank accounts in Switzerland and Dubai.

It is considered one of the largest money laundering cases ever handled in France.

The investigation highlighted the connections between organized crime, international fraud, and tax evasion. It also shed light on how both formal and informal financial systems can work together to facilitate illicit financial flows.

Notably, the role of the law firm Mossack Fonseca—later known for its involvement in the Panama Papers—was already identified as involved by the OCRGDF during this operation.
