= Last Days (2014 film) =

- Theatrical release poster
- Directed by: Kathryn Bigelow
- Written by: Scott Z. Burns
- Produced by: Megan Ellison
- Edited by: James Ryan; Mike Andres
- Production company: Annapurna Pictures
- Release date: September 27, 2014 (NYFF)
- Running time: 3 minutes
- Country: United States
- Language: English

Last Days is a 2014 American animated short documentary film about the decline of African elephant populations and the illegal ivory trade. It was directed by Kathryn Bigelow and written by Scott Z. Burns. Featured in the film is footage of the 2013 Westgate shopping mall attack in Nairobi, Kenya, which has been attributed to the militant organization Al-Shabaab. The film advances the claim that terrorist networks derive much of their income from poached ivory.

These claims, which were similar to ones made by several public officials including former U.S. Secretary of State Hillary Clinton, UK Foreign Secretary William Hague, and Kenyan President Uhuru Kenyatta, were based on a 2013 report by the environmental nonprofit Elephant Action League (EAL). However, a report published jointly by Interpol and the United Nations Environment Programme described EAL's findings as "highly unreliable". According to the report, Al-Shabaab's primary income comes from the trade in charcoal, a significant source of deforestation.

The world premiere of Last Days was held at the New York Film Festival on September 27, 2014.

== Reception ==
Last Days has been subjected to criticism for being overly simplistic and misleading in its portrayal of how to stop elephant poaching. Survival International, an international organization promoting tribal peoples' rights, has asked for the film to be withdrawn.

Survival Director Stephen Corry said: "The militarization of conservation is gaining momentum, and it is increasingly fuelling the brutal persecution of hunter-gathering tribes. Tribespeople who hunt to feed their families face arrest and beatings, torture and death at the hands of heavily armed park guards. It seems that the link Bigelow's film claims between the Westgate terrorist attack and ivory poaching doesn’t exist in real life. For certain conservationists to manipulate public opinion like this in favor of policies which exacerbate the destruction of tribal peoples, the best guardians of the natural world, is simply unacceptable."

== See also ==
- Environmental crime
- The Ivory Game, 2016 documentary on the trade in ivory
- Short film
- Wildlife trade
