= Consejo Nacional de Relaciones Exteriores =

The Panamanian National Council on Foreign Relations "Consejo Nacional de Relaciones Exteriores" or CONAREX is a consultation body of the Minister of Foreign Affairs.

The council was created under the Law 28 of 1999 under the government of Ricardo Martinelli of Panama. The members serve pro bono and are appointed by the Executive and convenes tri-annually, or "when is convened extraordinarily". The first council was installed November 19, 2009, when Vice President Juan Carlos Varela, served as foreign minister.

Foreign Minister Nunez Fabrega said one of the members resigned in 2013 due to the North Korea Ship Seizure but would not name them.

== 1999- Members ==
- Rafael E. Bárcenas Perez

== 2009-2014 Members ==
- José Miguel Alemán Healy
- Víctor S. Azrak
- Rafael E. Bárcenas Perez
- Navin Bhakta
- Alejandro Blanco
- Aníbal Galindo Navarro
- Emanuel González-Revilla Jurado
- William Liberman (Guillermo)
- Guido J. Martinelli Endara
- Jurgen Mossack
- Stanley Alberto Motta Cunningham
- Janet Poll Sarlabous
- Nicholas Psychoyos Tagaropulos
- Isabel St. Malo de Alvarado
- Taher Yaafar Chahine

Secretary: Tomás A. Guardia

== 2014-2016 Members ==
- Alejandro Blanco
- Alberto Alemán Zubieta
- Alexandra Castro
- Álvaro Tomas
- Anabella de Rubinoff
- Emanuel González Revilla Jurado
- Irene Perurena
- Isaac Btesh
- Janet Poll Sarlabous
- Marcel Salamín
- Joseph E. Harari
- José Miguel Alemán
- Ramón Morales
- Ricardo Alberto Arias
- Sabrina Bacal
- Stanley Motta
- Taher Yaafar

== Notable members ==
Jürgen Mossack served the council from 2009 to 2014. On April 7, 2016, it was announced that he was resigning after the Panama Papers leak.
