= Víctor S. Azrak =

Víctor S. Azrak Atie was a member of CONAREX in Panama from 2009 to 2014. He serves on the board of Banco Aliado as treasurer.
