= Leaktivism =

Leaktivism is defined as the action of distributing confidential documents to the public in an attempt to directly impact the socio-economic and political spheres. The term Leaktivism was popularized by Micah White, the co-founder of the Occupy movement, in relation to the Panama Papers.

== Origins ==
The Panama Papers are a collection of 11.5m leaked files from one of the world's largest law firms, Mossack Fonseca. A German newspaper called Süddeutsche Zeitung was able to obtain the database from an anonymous source acting under the pseudonym John Doe, who stated he was releasing the papers to draw attention to wealth inequality. The different files demonstrated the manner in which the different wealthy individuals are able to take advantage of secrete offshore tax regimes.

Several heads of state and heads of government were included among the 143 politicians impacted within the leak. (See List of people named in the Panama Papers.)

The information leaked in regards to the Panama Papers is considered one of the largest leaks in history. This leak is considered to be larger than both the US diplomatic cables leak in 2010 and the 2010s global surveillance disclosures. In total there 11.5m documents along with 2.6 terabytes of information taken from the Mossack Fonseca’s internal database.

== Establishment of Leaktivism ==
Micah White is the co-founder of Occupy and a democratic activist. His article in the Guardian states that the Panama Papers illustrate the rising of leaktivism. He argues that they show that leaking information can be an impactful form of protest, with the ability to destabilize numerous governments throughout the globe, impacting the credibility of powerful world leaders.

White states that the Panama Papers have resulted in positive social change. He uses the example of the former Icelandic Prime Minister Sigmundur Davíð Gunnlaugsson, who was forced to resign from his position. However, he does argue that while the resignation of some corrupt political leaders is progress, it does not solve the larger problem; namely, that our world is being run by the top 1%. He says that individuals must go beyond traditional activism and try different methods of protest, developing the manner in which our society protests in relation to the technology that is developing.

White concludes his article by stating that the main problem that the Panama Papers illustrates is a questions concerning the governance of our world. The leak demonstrates who is actually in power. He further argues that the distribution of the papers will only be successful if it bring upon change."

== See also ==
- Hacktivism
