= De la Bárcena =

De la Bárcena is a Spanish surname. Notable people with the surname include:

- Guillermo Cañedo de la Bárcena (1920–1997), Mexican entrepreneur and football manager
- José Patricio de la Bárcena (1807–1881), Mexican politician
- Mariano de la Bárcena (1842–1899), Mexican engineer, botanist, and politician
- Pedro de la Bárcena (1768–1836), Spanish military

== See also ==
- Bárcena (surname)
