= José Patricio de la Bárcena =

Mexican politician

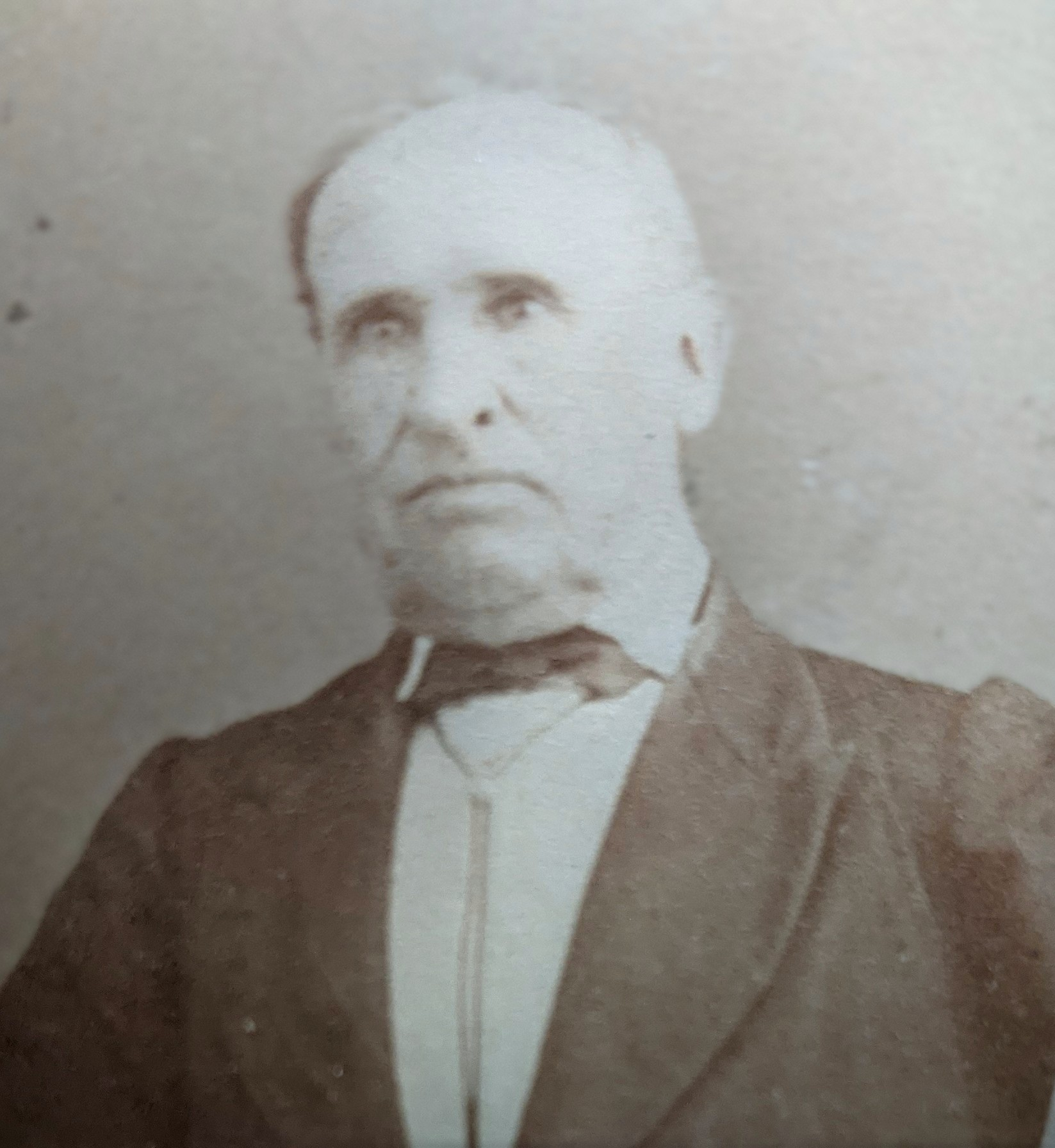
José Patricio de la Bárcena

José Patricio Gabriel de la Bárcena Ponze was a politician from Durango City, Mexico. He was born in 1807, and died in 1881 in Victoria de Durango, Durango.

De la Bárcena was a Mexican lawyer and officer in the National Guard, who joined the Secretariat in Durango in 1833, became its Interior Secretary in 1835, before becoming Diputado (representative) to the National Congress in 1836. He later became Durango Deputy Secretary (1837); Secretary of Government, Durango (1846); Diputado to the National Congress of 1846; Senator of the Mexican Republic from the State of Durango (1852); and Governor of Durango Mexico from 1856 to 1858 and briefly during 1874.

== Family ==
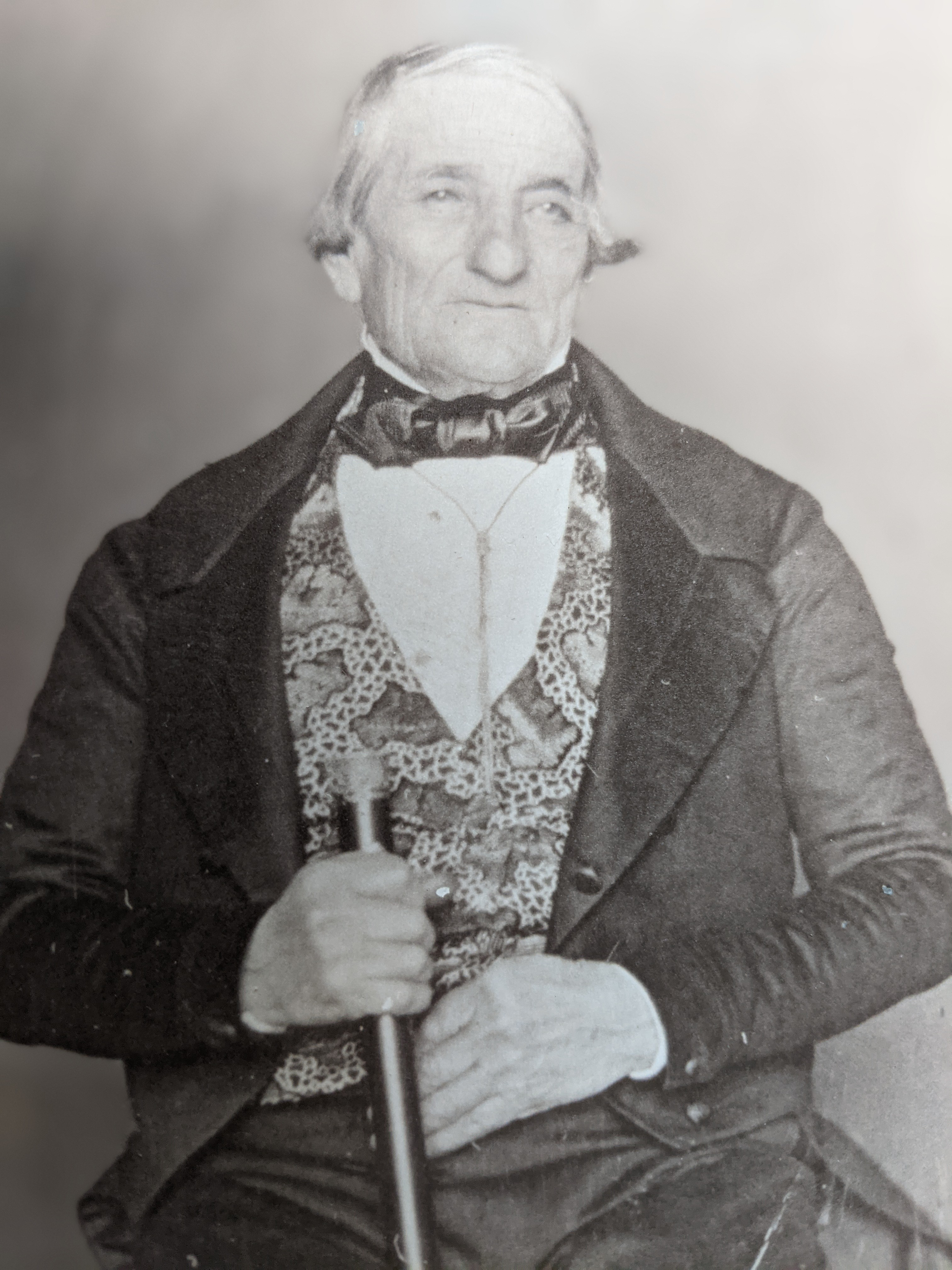
Josef de la Barcena y Manzano of Durango, Nueva Vizcaya

José Patricio de la Bárcena was born to Josef de la Bárcena y Manzano (b. 1746) and Maria Guadalupe Ponce Ibargüen (b. 1787). His father was one of the first criollo (a person of Spanish ancestry born in Spanish America) crown attorneys at the Royal Audience of Guadalajara tribunal. Josef became the Nueva Vizcaya Official for Taxes on tobacco and gunpowder and was appointed Lieutenant Attorney and Advisor to the Governor Intendente of Nueva Vizcaya by the Viceroy of New Spain, Count of Revillagigedo Juan Vicente de Güemes, on May 18, 1790. He served as interim Governor Intendente of Nueva Vizcaya in 1792, (Note: There were inconsistencies, including an error in his maternal surname.) and continued to serve as a Regidor Perpetuo (permanent city alderman) (1795–1802) and Alcalde mas Antiguo (Oldest Mayor) of the Municipality of Durango (18??–1813+). José had two older half-brothers from his father's first marriage who were also prominent attorneys in Durango: José Maria Ignacio de la Bárcena Meraz (b. 1778) Assesor Letrado (Legal Advisor) in the Royal Audience of Guadalajara, and Alcalde Ordinario (Judicial Magistrate) of the City of Durango; and José Dionisio Marcelino de la Bárcena Meraz (b. 1780) who served as a military sub-lieutenant in Nueva Vizcaya sometime after 1810.

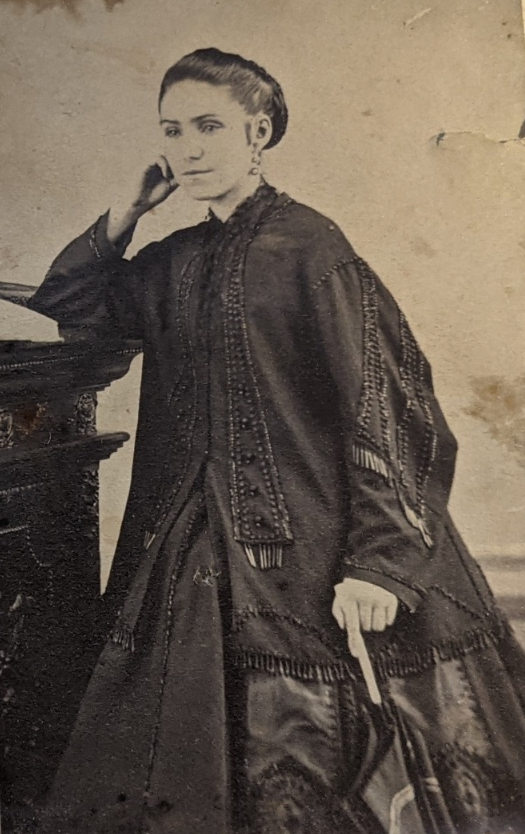
Isabel Jacques de la Barcena, wife of José Patricio de la Barcena

== Biography ==
De la Bárcena became a practicing attorney, a senior official of the Durango Secretariat, an officer of the National Guard, Interior Secretary, Durango (1835), national congressional Diputado (1836), and Deputy Secretary of Durango in 1837. He led defensive military counterattacks against well-armed nomadic raiding tribes from the northern plains that were constantly invading Durango territories, killing and kidnapping settlers, and looting and burning homes and ranches in 1835, and ordered further counterattacks as governor in 1857.

De la Bárcena married Maria Ysabel Xáquez Garcia (1821–1900) in 1842 and they raised twelve children. He was Secretary of Government for the State of Durango when he was appointed as Diputado from Durango to the National Congress in Mexico City in 1846. He became a senator of the Mexican Republic in 1852. José Patricio de la Bárcena was one of the Durango Liberal group leaders who emerged from the Ayutla Revolution, which included Francisco Elorreaga, José Maria Hernández and José Maria del Regato. After serving as provisional governor of Durango in the first months of 1856, de la Bárcena was appointed Constituent Governor of the State of Durango on March 9, 1856, by the moderate liberal Mexican president General Ignacio Comonfort following the death of Durango Governor José Maria del Regato in October of 1856. De la Bárcena inherited a public treasury in severe crisis, as was the administration of justice in Durango, and the instability of local and national politics. In the national elections of December 1, 1857, Ignacio Comonfort was elected President of the Republic of Mexico and Benito Juarez was elected Chief Magistrate of the Supreme Court of Justice.

De la Bárcena was elected Constitutional Governor of Durango in 1857. As a liberal governor, de la Bárcena implemented the metric system and reorganized the public treasury and tax collection schemes. He believed the greatest drain on the state economy resulted from constant attacks from better-armed northern plains nomadic tribes on ranches and settlements in the territories, and started a defensive alliance with governors of Chihuahua, Zacatecas, Sonora, and Tamaulipas, but lacked support from the federal government. He also tenaciously pursued large gangs of bandits who attacked and looted main towns. The Constitution of the United Mexican States of 1857" was issued on February 5, 1857, and sworn in Durango on March 29 and 30.

De la Bárcena circulated the draft of the new liberal, federalist "Constitución Politica del Estado de Durango" drawn up by the state congress, and on November 3, 1857, convened the legislature, and signed and issued the new state constitution on November 12. The constitution initiated the primary Reform Laws, which was met with strong opposition from conservatives, including the church and army. In Mexico City, the Board of the Conservative Party under General Félix Maria Zuloaga had issued the Tacubaya Plan on December 27, 1857, which sought to repeal the liberal Constitution of 1857 and replace it with a conservative constitution; it was drawn up at the palace of the archbishop of Mexico, José Lazaro de la Garza, in Tacubaya, Mexico City. The archbishop declared that anyone who swore to the Constitution of 1857 would be excommunicated from the church, leading many to side with those opposing the new constitution. Bishop Antonio Laureano López de Zubiría of Durango called on his priests to condemn the new constitution from the pulpit, and de la Bárcena, reportedly a religious man, was consequently banned from attending Mass by Bishop Zubiria. On April 17, de la Garza published a decree stating that those who changed their minds and supported the Tacubaya Plan would be pardoned. Four of six ministers of the Durango Supreme Tribunal, their staffs, the interior minister, a number of lawyers, three officials of the national guard, several justices of the peace, and others refused to accept the new constitution. Benito Juarez, former Chief Magistrate of the national Supreme Court of Justice and newly-elected and legitimate Constitutional President of the Republic of Mexico, defended the existing Constitution of 1857 that had been ratified by the Constituent Congress and President Ignacio Comonfort on February 5, 1857. Beginning his term as Durango state governor in 1856, de la Bárcena defended public education.

De la Bárcena and the liberals founded the College of Secondary Education of Durango (today's University Juarez of the State of Durango) by decree on April 9, 1856. The College was inaugurated in a solemn ceremony led by the governor on August 15, 1856. The original campus opened in the late-18th century mansion of José Fernando Ramirez. It was purchased by the government in 1851 for 31,000 pesos; its library (7,447 volumes of 15-18th century works) of the Mexican historian, liberal politician and jurist Ramirez, became the first public library in Durango in 1853.

During 1857–1858 the Palacio Zambrano was completely expropriated by the state, for back taxes, to become executive offices of government. De la Bárcena hired German engineering professor Federico Weidner in 1857 as civil engineer for the state, who submitted a plan to reconstruct the city aqueduct, and planned a technological teaching institute in Durango that focused on the mining industry; the Technological Institute in Durango became the first in the republic 90 years later in 1948. On December 30, 1857, de la Bárcena issued a proclamation supporting the Tacubaya plan that called for a new constitution allegedly because "...the majority of the people have not been satisfied with the charter given to them by their leaders" (Plan of Tacubaya; trans. from Spanish). De la Bárcena (as had then-president Comonfort) then wavered, which brought him into the battle between the liberals and the conservatives. Historians opine that it was a mistake for de la Bárcena to agree to the Tacubaya Plan, though it may not have changed the course of history in the coming Civil War of Reform. De la Bárcena continued in his actions as liberal governor even after his Tacubaya declaration.

The liberals forced the governor to declare the city of Durango under siege from January 2 to March 18, 1858. National anti-reformist Luis Zuloaga arrived with troops and deposed de la Barcena at the beginning of April 1858, as his brother General Félix Maria Zuloaga had done to President Comonfort on January 11, 1858. The Durango legislature was dissolved, which contributed to the local and national Civil War of Reform or "War of Three Years." De la Bárcena tried to create difficulties in handing over the government to General Heredia, sent by General Zuloaga; but finally complied. President-General Zuloaga wrote a letter to Pope Pius IX on January 31, 1858, assuring the Pontiff that harmony between the church and state "had been fully restored". Prior to the Reform, church corporations had owned roughly one-third of the real estate of Mexico, and about one half of the immovable property of the municipalities; therefore, in 1858, Mexico had two opposing presidents and administrations. The conservative military general José Antonio Heredia occupied the governor's office from April 4 to July 8, 1858, until 600 liberal forces under Colonel Esteban Coronado Hinojosa and Lieutenant Colonel José Maria Patoni captured the city and assumed the chief magistracy. Luis Zuloaga's conservative forces returned and routed the liberal forces in 1859, and he became a temporary governor until he was replaced by Patoni on November 8, 1859, by a majority of the Diputacion Permanente (Standing Committee) legislature of Durango.

On September 11, 1859, a force of 200 conservatives and bandits known as Los Tulises attacked the capital, Victoria de Durango, and temporarily took the Plaza de Armas and Government Palace. De la Bárcena's home was among the buildings that were targeted and looted. In 1860, conservative Governor Rafael Peña (March–May, 1860) ordered the brief closure of the Civil College and Public Library, both identified as "seedbeds of liberalism". The War of Reform ended, and the full validity of the Constitution of 1857 was restored with the election of President Juarez in 1861. Juarez and his cabinet returned to the Federal District in Mexico City on January 11, 1861. An order of exile was issued to de la Garza and four bishops on January 6, 1861, for having taken the side of the Conservative Party. Zubiría, who had been so angrily opposed to the Laws of Reform, was exiled and took refuge in a cave on property belonging to a relative, where he died in 1863. On December 26, 1866, Juarez made his triumphant entry into Durango. That evening there was a grand ball hosted at the Government Palace by a reception committee of de la Bárcena, José Maria Guerrero, and Ignacio Asúnsolo.

De la Bárcena returned to serve as Governor of Durango briefly from June to August 1874. He died in 1881 at age 74 in his home on Hidalgo Street, today the General Command of the 10th Military Zone of the Ministry of National Defense. In the judicial review "Constitutionalist Governors of Durango: Historical View" (2013), attorney Raquel Sifuentes Valtierra agrees with attorneys Areola, Gamez & Parrall (1979) and Durango lawyer-historian C. Hernández (1903), who describe de la Bárcena to have philanthropic attitudes and an open liberal ideology. Sifuentes Valtierra observes: "In this national social and political environment, Governor José de la Bárcena could intelligently circumvent the situation in the State of Durango with clear republican ideals and loyalty to his liberal principles."

== Literature ==
- (Spanish) José de la Bárcena (Durango, 1832, [age 24 y/o]) Discurso pronunciado: "Aniversario del glorioso Grito de Libertad, lanzado en Dolores el dia 16 de Septiembre de 1810." Catalogos de la Biblioteca National de México. Jose M. Vigil. (1889) Octava Division: Filología y Bellas Letras. México.
- (Spanish) José de la Bárcena (April 4, 1857). "El gobernador comandante general del estado a la llegada de la compañia de caballeros de seguridad publica en su regreso de la campañia. In A. A. Hernandez (2013) p. 333. Antonio Avitia Hernández.
- (Spanish/English) Alberto Espinosa Orozco (January 24, 2017). "La vieja casona de Jose Fernando Ramirez" Terranova (Revista de Cultura, Critica y Curiosidades). México.
- (English) Michael C. Meyer & William H. Beezley (Eds.) (2000). The Oxford History of Mexico. Oxford: Oxford University Press.
- (Spanish) UTEP Collection "Guide to Microfilm: Casilleros from the "Archivo Historical del Estado de Durango."" Guides to Microfilm Collections. Paper 2: 1970 Guide to Microfilm: Casilleros from the "Archivo Histórico del Estado de Durango"
- (Spanish) Ciudad de Durango 1915-1940. (March, 1941). Commemorative monograph published by the Cámara Nacional de Comercio y Industria de la Ciudad de Durango. 25th anniversary of the Chamber of Commerce. La Comisión Editoria. Durango, Dg. México. pg. 241 showing the "Programa de bienvenida a D. Benito Juarez en su visita a Durango."
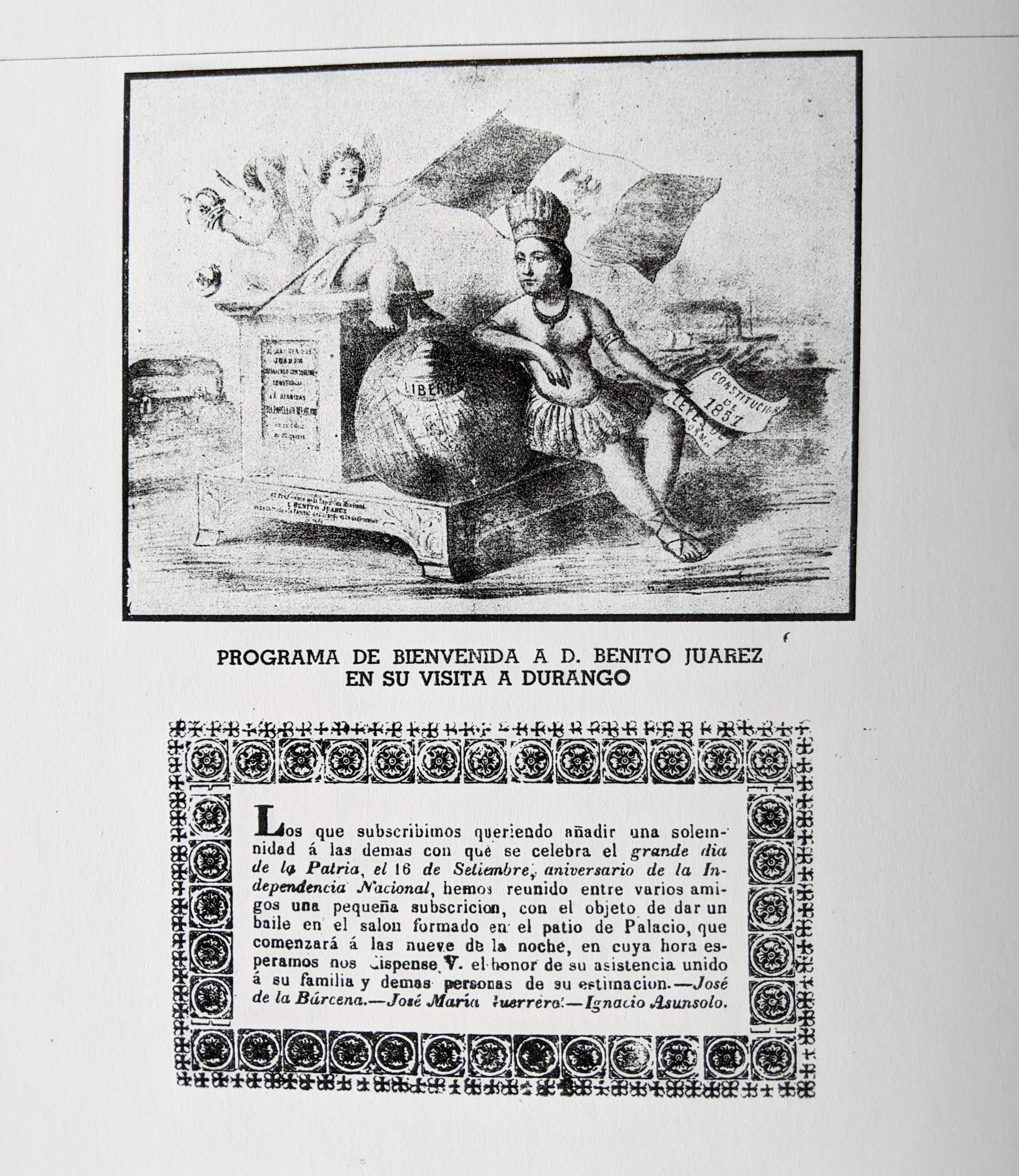
  Programa de bienvenida a Presidente Benito Juarez en su visita a Durango
- Evarado Gámiz Olivas (1953) "Historia del Estado de Durango." Gobierno del Estado de Durango. pg. 174. Records that in the post-Ayutla Reforma era, liberals were called "cuchas" and conservatives "the chirinos." Liberal women reportedly wore green colored shoes to signify walking on the conservatives, who in turn wore red shoes to signify the same back. México D.F.: Edición de Everado Gamiz Fernandez.
