= Scott Z. Burns =

American filmmaker (born 1962)

- Born: July 17, 1962 (age 64); Golden Valley, Minnesota, U.S.
- Education: University of Minnesota
- Occupations: Screenwriter, director, producer
- Notable work: An Inconvenient Truth; Pu-239; The Bourne Ultimatum; The Informant!; Contagion; Side Effects; Last Days; The Laundromat; Extrapolations; Dune: Prophecy

Scott Z. Burns (born July 17, 1962) is an American filmmaker, screenwriter, producer, director, and playwright. He is known as the writer of the pandemic thriller film Contagion (2011) and as the writer, director, creator, executive producer, and showrunner of the futuristic climate change drama series Extrapolations (2023). He was also a producer of the documentary An Inconvenient Truth (2006). His work often explores global and existential issues.

== Early life and education ==
Burns was born in 1962 in Golden Valley, Minnesota. In 1985, Burns graduated summa cum laude with a degree in English from the University of Minnesota.

== Career ==
After graduating from the University of Minnesota, Burns began his career in advertising, later becoming a television commercials director. He was part of the team at Goodby, Silverstein & Partners that created the original Got Milk? campaign.

Burns has written screenplays for The Bourne Ultimatum (2007), The Informant! (2009), and Contagion (2011), all of which feature Matt Damon. His films The Informant! (2009), Contagion (2011), and Side Effects (2013) were directed by Steven Soderbergh. He also wrote a screenplay for The Man from U.N.C.L.E, which was initially intended to be directed by Soderbergh but was ultimately directed by Guy Ritchie. Burns also produced the Academy Award-winning documentary An Inconvenient Truth (2006). He wrote and directed the film The Report (2019), a drama about the secret torture program inside the CIA. He performed uncredited rewrites on Dawn of the Planet of the Apes, the Star Wars film Rogue One and the James Bond film No Time to Die (2021).

Public interest in Burns's film Contagion (2011) renewed during the COVID-19 pandemic, making it the seventh-most downloaded film on iTunes by March 6, 2020.

In a March 2020 interview, Burns commented on the film's resurgence and similarities to the active pandemic, especially in the wake of a round of CDC budget cuts:

"I was terrified. Every scientist who I spoke to when I worked on the movie said that exact same thing to me: It's not a matter of 'if,' it's a matter of 'when.' You can decide that most of the time, firemen are just sitting around. But it's very hard to start a fire department once your house is on fire. And so the notion that we're going to cut these things and we'll just try to rebuild them when we need them is foolish and dangerous. I was very aware that our Department of Homeland Security had a pandemic team standing by because this is a real threat. The fact that this administration decided to do away with that puts all of us at risk."

— Scott Burns

Burns was announced to write the screenplay for a new adaptation of Bret Easton Ellis' novel American Psycho, with Luca Guadagnino directing and Lionsgate distributing. Guadagnino went on to praise Burns' script in 2026 but noted the project had fallen apart.

Burns also secretly wrote a screenplay for a Star Wars film set after Episode IX - The Rise of Skywalker, entitled The Hunt for Ben Solo (and operating under the code name Quiet Leaves), directed by Steven Soderbergh and starring Adam Driver as Ben Solo/Kylo Ren. While Lucasfilm loved the idea, when they presented the screenplay to Disney, Bob Iger and Alan Bergman said no because, according to Driver, "They didn't see how Ben Solo was alive. And that was that." Still, Burns received a reportedly seven-figure payment for the script.

== Filmography ==
=== Films ===
Year	Title	Director	Writer	Producer	Notes
2006	An Inconvenient Truth	No	No	Yes	Documentary
2006	Pu-239	Yes	Yes	No	
2007	The Bourne Ultimatum	No	Yes	No	
2009	The Informant!	No	Yes	No	
2011	Contagion	No	Yes	No	
2013	Side Effects	No	Yes	Yes	
2014	Last Days	No	Yes	No	Animated short documentary film
2014	Dawn of the Planet of the Apes	No	Uncredited	No	
2016	Rogue One	No	Uncredited	No	
2017	The Mercy	No	Yes	Yes	
2019	The Report	Yes	Yes	Yes	
2019	The Laundromat	No	Yes	Yes	
2021	No Time to Die	No	Uncredited	No	

=== Television ===
Year	Title	Director	Writer	Executive producer	Notes
2007	Californication	Yes	No	No	Episode "Filthy Lucre"
2018	The View from Here	Yes	No	Yes	TV miniseries
2019	The Loudest Voice	Yes	No	No	Episode "2016"
2023	Extrapolations	Yes	Yes	Yes	Also showrunner
2024	Dune: Prophecy	No	No	Yes	

=== Plays ===
Year	Title
2014	The Library
