= Bárcena (surname) =

Bárcena is a Spanish surname. Notable people with the surname include:

- Alicia Bárcena (born 1952), Mexican biologist and the United Nations Executive Secretary of ECLAC
- Alonzo de Barcena (1528–1598), Spanish Jesuit missionary and linguist
- Catalina Bárcena (1888–1978), Spanish theatre actress
- David Bárcena Ríos (1941–2017), Mexican equestrian
- Juan Gómez Bárcena (born 1984), Spanish author and literary critic
- Marisol Vargas Bárcena (born 1975), Mexican politician
- Martha Bárcena Coqui (born 1957), Mexican diplomat
- Rafael García Bárcena (1907–1961), Cuban philosopher

== See also ==
- De la Bárcena
