= Marisol Vargas Bárcena =

Mexican politician (born 1975)

- Born: 27 January 1975 (age 51); Hidalgo, Mexico
- Occupation: Politician
- Political party: PAN

Marisol Vargas Bárcena (born 27 January 1975) is a Mexican politician affiliated with the National Action Party. She represents the state of Hidalgo and the fifth electoral region in the Chamber of Deputies for the LXIII Legislature of the Mexican Congress.

== Life ==
Vargas began her political career in the PAN and the municipality of Pachuca in 1996, while she studied for her law degree from the Colegio Anáhuac. In 1997, she became the state coordinator of the PAN's Secretariat for the Political Promotion of Women, a time in which she also served as a legal advisor to the PAN delegation to the state congress as well as to the PAN's town councilors in Pachuca.

From 2001 to 2003, Vargas simultaneously served as the president of the PAN in Hidalgo, as well as a town councilor in Pachuca. At the end of her stint in those posts, she was elected to the LIX Legislature as a federal deputy. She sat on the Constitutional Points, Justice and Human Rights, Population, Borders and Migratory Matters, and Housing Commissions.

In 2013, after an extended stint as a delegate of the Mexican Social Security Institute in Hidalgo, Vargas retired from the post. Two years later, the PAN returned her to the Chamber of Deputies for the LXIII Legislature. She sits on the Government, Ranching, and Foreign Relations Commissions, as well as on the Administration Committee.
