= Guido J. Martinelli Endara =

Panamanian banker

Guido J. Martinelli Endara was a member of CONAREX in Panama from 2009 till 2014 Director of BancoPanamá, Panama, since 2008. Chair of Corporación de Finanzas del País which was renamed to PanaCredit, S.A., Panama (since 2008). From 1991 to 2007 he was director, senior vice-president and CEO of Banco Panamericano S.A. (PANABANK), which was founded in 1981 with him at the board as Banco Agroganadero de Producción y Desarrollo (AGROBANK) From 1986 to 1990 lawyer (partner) in the law firm De La Guardia, Arosemena & Benedetti, Panama. Frin 1985-1986 lawyer and partner of New York Foreign Relations Law Firm Haight, Gardner, Poor & Havens.
