= Jürgen Mossack =

German-Panamanian tax lawyer (born 1948)

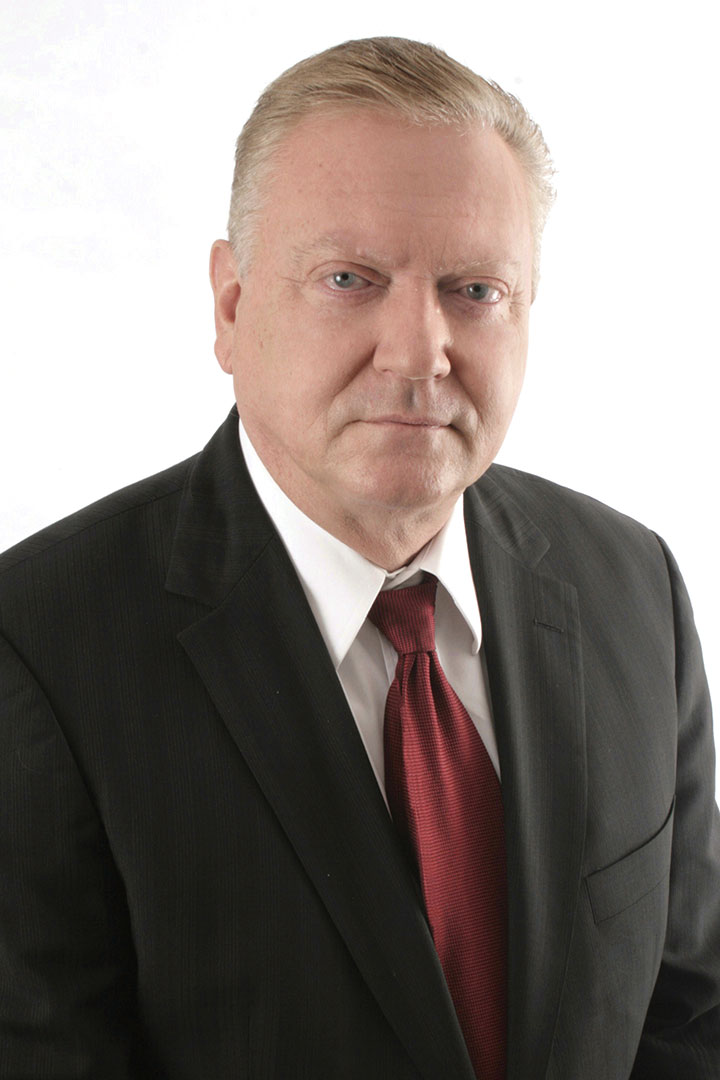
- Mossack in 2009
- Born: Jürgen Rolf Dieter Mossack; 20 March 1948 (age 78); Fürth, Germany (Note: Germany was under Allied occupation at the time of Mossack's birth.)
- Education: Universidad Católica Santa María La Antigua (LLB)
- Known for: Co-founder of Mossack Fonseca

Jürgen Rolf Dieter Mossack (born 20 March 1948) is a German and Panamanian lawyer and the co-founder of Mossack Fonseca, a former law firm headquartered in Panama City which had more than 40 offices worldwide. The firm gained global notoriety in 2016 when it found itself at the centre of the Panama Papers affair, which uncovered the activities of the offshore finance industry. According to the leaked papers, Mossack Fonseca set up more than 214,000 shell companies around the world, some of which were found to have been used for illegal purposes, including fraud and tax evasion. In 2016, Mossack Fonseca was raided by police on suspicion of money-laundering, bribery and corruption. Mossack and his partner Ramón Fonseca Mora were arrested and jailed on 10 February 2017. They were initially refused bail because the court saw a flight risk, but were released on 21 April 2017 after a judge ruled they had cooperated with the investigation and ordered them each to pay $500,000 in bail. In March 2018, the firm announced it was shutting down. In June 2024, Jürgen Mossack was found innocent of all charges by Judge Baloisa Marquinez, in the Republic of Panama.

== Early life ==
Mossack was born in Fürth, Bavaria, Germany, on 20 March 1948. His father, Erhard Mossack, was a mechanical engineer who had served as a combat soldier with the rank of Rottenführer (senior corporal) in the Waffen-SS, the armed wing of the Nazi Party's Schutzstaffel, during World War II.

When Jürgen Mossack was 13 he moved with his father and the rest of his family to Panama. Once in Panama, Erhard Mossack offered his services to the Central Intelligence Agency (CIA) for spying on Communist activity in Cuba. Germany's Federal Intelligence Service, said in 2016, when contacted by journalists, that they had documents related to Erhard Mossack but would not share any information, owing to possible security risks.

Mossack received a bachelor's degree in law from Universidad Católica Santa María La Antigua in 1973.

His brother, Peter Mossack, was the Panamanian honorary consul in Frankfurt.

== Career ==
In 1975, Mossack worked as a lawyer in London before returning to Panama to start a firm in 1977. Mossack's practice only became Mossack Fonseca in 1986, when it merged with the firm run by Ramón Fonseca Mora, a Panamanian novelist, lawyer, and politician. They built a global group of 600 employees and 46 subsidiaries, across countries including the Bahamas, the British Virgin Islands, Hong Kong, Switzerland, Jersey, Luxembourg, and the US, specifically the states of Wyoming, Florida, and Nevada. In March 2018, the firm shut down in the wake of its involvement in activities cited the Panama Papers affair.

Mossack served on Conarex, Panama's council on foreign relations, from 2009 to 2014. On 7 April 2016, he announced that given the leak he was resigning from Conarex.

Mossack is a member of the International Bar Association, the Society of Trust and Estate Practitioners, the Panama Bar Association, the International Maritime Association, and the Maritime National Association. Mossack's holdings, according to the files obtained by the International Consortium of Investigative Journalists (ICIJ), include a teak plantation and other real estate, an executive helicopter, a yacht named Rex Maris and a collection of gold coins.

== Criminal investigations ==
=== Panama Papers ===
On 3 April 2016, leaked documents from the company's private archive, dubbed the Panama Papers, revealed detailed information on more than 214,000 offshore companies, including the identities of shareholders and directors. Mossack told The Wall Street Journal that the intermediary banks that his firm worked with — and who represent the final recipients of the shell companies — should have done better reviews of their clients: "Our brand needs to be protected. We feel the best way to protect the brand is by doing things ourselves and not rely on others."

News stories in April 2016 established that the Panamanian consul in Frankfurt was using the "Panama" email ID and questioned whether he should be doing so. Mossack's brother Peter served as Honorary Consul of Panama in Frankfurt am Main, Germany, from 2010 to 16 April 2016.

Both Mossack and Fonseca were arrested in Panama in February 2017 and were released on bail two months later, after each paid US$500,000 in bail.

According to court papers filed on 15 October 2019, Mossack and Fonseca "are the subjects of an FBI Investigation in the Southern District of New York" and are "defending criminal charges against them in Panama."

On 20 October 2020, prosecutors in Cologne, Germany, issued international arrest warrants for Mossack and Panamanian Ramón Fonseca. Charges against the two law partners included accessory to tax evasion and forming a criminal organization, with the firm noted as central to the investigation.

Jürgen Mossack and Ramón Fonseca were put on trial on 26 June 2023 in a court in Panama City for alleged money laundering. The prosecution asked for up to 12 years in prison for concealing assets linked to the "Operation Car Wash" case. It also requested sentences for 26 other people and the acquittal of four other defendants. Both were acquitted of all charges in June 2024. Fonseca died a month later.

=== Money laundering in Brazil ===
Mossack Fonseca was linked to a corruption scandal in Brazil known as Operation Car Wash, which investigated bribes paid to politicians by companies doing business with the state-run oil company, Petrobras. Investigators began focusing on the law firm after finding an array of apartments in the names of relatives of an imprisoned politician, The New York Times reported.

== Personal life ==
Mossack has one son and four daughters. Mossack is married to Leydelises Pérez de Mossack, herself a legal professional.

Mossack is a collector of gold coins, and a member of the International Maritime Association and the Club Union of Panama.

== In popular culture ==
In 2016, Steven Soderbergh announced he would produce a film about the Panama Papers affair. The comedy-drama The Laundromat premiered at the Venice Film Festival on 1 September 2019. Mossack and Fonseca tried to block the film's release on Netflix by filing a defamation lawsuit against Netflix in October 2019, arguing that the ongoing FBI investigation and possible trial in New York as well as their defence against criminal charges in Panama could be negatively prejudiced by the way they are portrayed in The Laundromat. A judge ruled that the case was filed in the wrong court, transferring it to Los Angeles. With a court decision still pending, the film was made available for streaming by Netflix on 18 October 2019. In the film, Mossack is portrayed by Gary Oldman and Fonseca by Antonio Banderas.
