= Rafael E. Bárcenas =

Panamian businessman

Rafael Ernesto Bárcenas Pérez (born 1944), was a member of CONAREX in Panama from its founding in 1999 till 2014. In 2009 the National Assembly of Panama selected him as its representative at the Panama Canal Authority’s Board of Director. He is Chairman of the media company BB&M.
