= José Juan Bárcenas =

Mexican politician

- Born: José Juan Bárcenas Gonzalez; 14 May 1961 (age 65); Tlaxcala, Mexico
- Education: fray Pedro de Gante, UPAEP, CIISDER.
- Occupation: Politician. Presidente del PArtido Acción Nacional en Tlaxcala. Diputado Federal. Contralor de DIF nacional. Director a CAPAM Tlaxcala. Catedrático de la UATX.
- Political party: PAN
- Spouse: Cecilia Mendez Moreno
- Children: Juan, Marisol, María José, Ana Belén y Rodrigo

José Juan Bárcenas González (born 14 May 1961) is a Mexican politician affiliated with the National Action Party. As of 2014 he served as Deputy of the LIX Legislature of the Mexican Congress as a plurinominal representative.
