= Mossack Fonseca =

Panamanian law firm and corporate service provider

Mossack Fonseca & Co.
- Headquarters: Mossfon Building; Calle 54 Este; Panama City, Panama
- No. of offices: 44
- No. of employees: 500+
- Key people: Rubén Hernández, CEO
- Date founded: 1977
- Founder: Jürgen Mossack and Ramón Fonseca
- Dissolved: March 2018
- Website: mossackfonseca.com

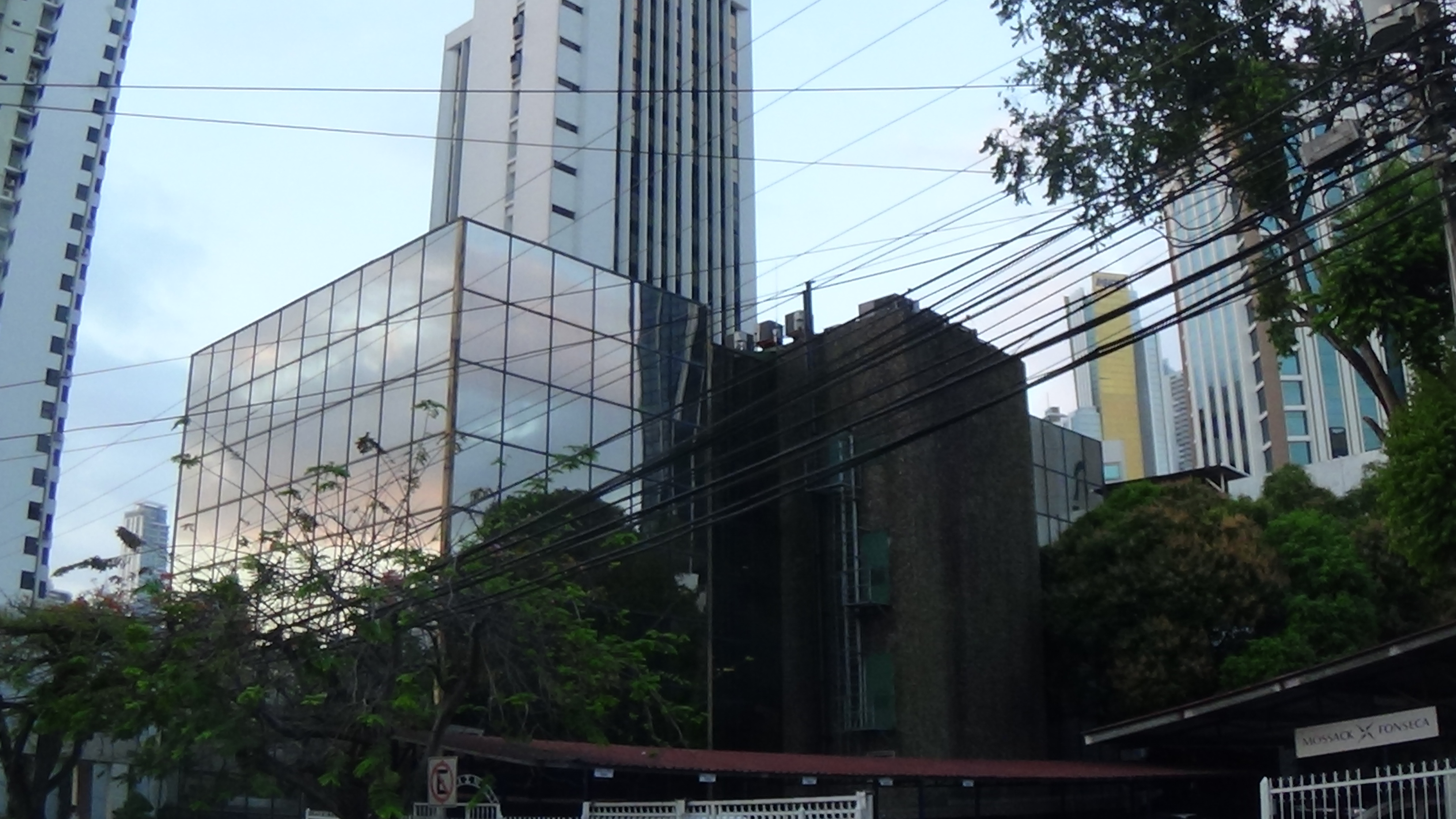
Former Mossack Fonseca headquarters

Mossack Fonseca & Co. (Spanish pronunciation: [moˈsak fonˈseka]) was a Panamanian law firm and corporate service provider. At one time it was the world's fourth-largest provider of offshore financial services. From its establishment in 1977 until the publication of the Panama Papers in April 2016, the company remained mostly obscured from public attention, even though it was a major firm in the global offshore industry and acted for approximately 300,000 companies. Prior to its dissolution, the company employed roughly 600 staff members spread across 42 countries.

The firm received worldwide media attention in April 2016, when the International Consortium of Investigative Journalists published information about the financial dealings of the firm's clients in the Panama Papers articles. These articles were the result of analyzing an enormous cache of documents, dated from 1970 and 2015, which were leaked to the news media, and which "implicated at least 140 politicians from more than 50 countries" in tax evasion schemes.

On 14 March 2018, the firm announced that it was closing due to the damage inflicted to its finances and reputation by the discovery of the multi-billion-dollar money laundering schemes.

== History and practice areas ==
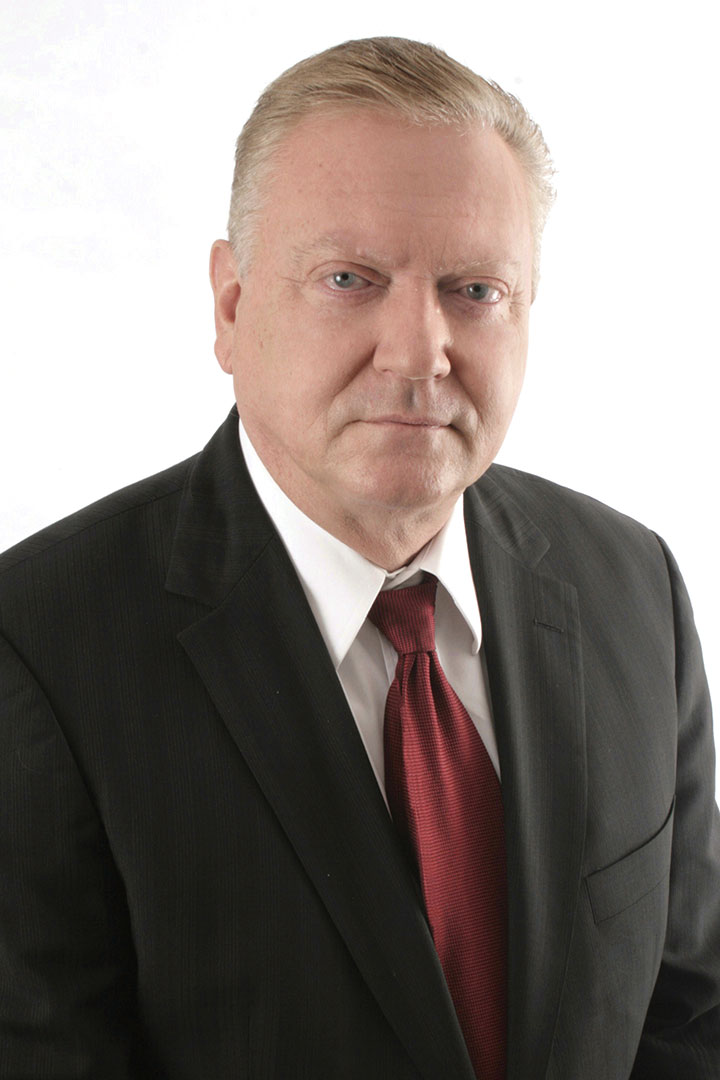
Jürgen Mossack

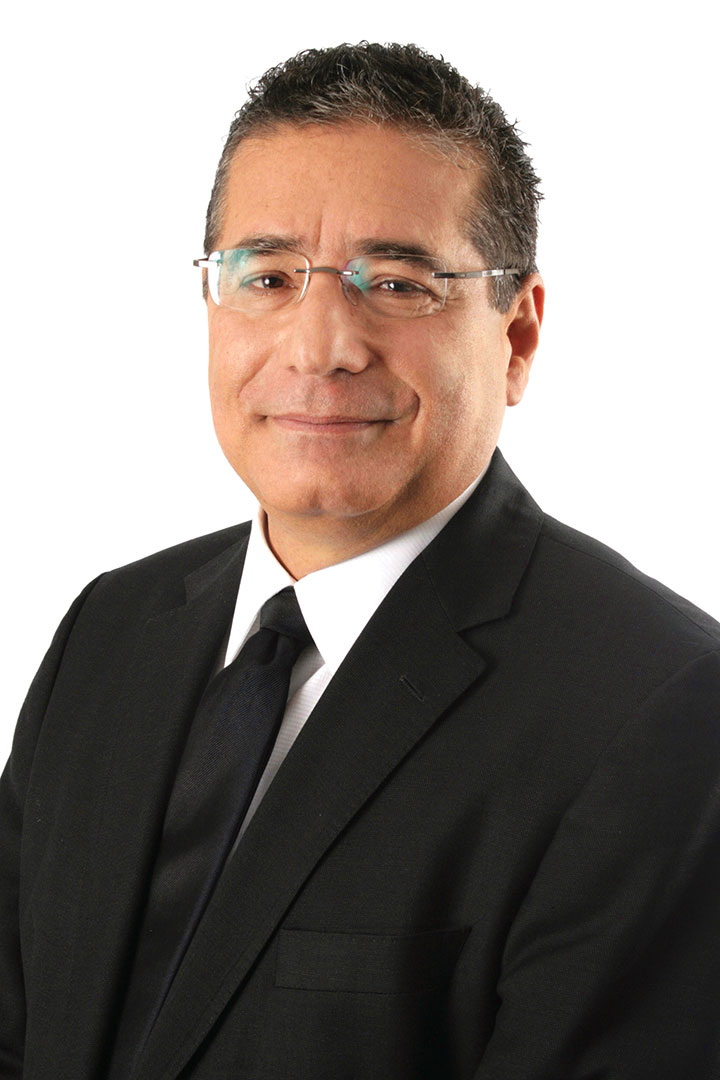
Ramón Fonseca

The firm was founded by German lawyer Jürgen Mossack in 1977, and joined by Panamanian novelist and lawyer Ramón Fonseca in 1986. It later added a third director, Swiss lawyer Christoph Zollinger.

The firm specialized in commercial law, trust services, investor advisory, and international business structures. It also offered intellectual property protection and maritime law services. An internal memorandum revealed in the 2016 Panama Papers leak noted that 95% of the company's work consisted of "selling vehicles to avoid taxes".

In 2013, the firm was described as one of seven that collectively represented more than half of the offshore companies incorporated in Panama. The firm also housed several Panama-incorporated companies within its offices. It was one of the largest firms in the corporate services industry. However, the founder claimed that its volume represented only around 5% of the global financial services legal industry. According to The Economist, the firm had 5 to 10% of the global shell company market, and it was described as "tight-lipped".

== Offices and international practice ==
The firm had nine offices in China, several in Latin America, others in the United States and Europe, with two in Switzerland. Lawyers from the firm were sent to foreign countries to promote business in Panama and Panamanian financial products.

Mossack established operations in the British Virgin Islands in 1987, where it incorporated more than 100,000 companies.

The firm was consulted by the country of Niue when it sought to become an offshore financial center, and managed that business exclusively for the country through its Panama headquarters. However, American banks imposed embargoes on bank transfers to Niue in 2001, leading to a shutdown of the business in 2005. Accounts of the firm's clients were moved from Niue to American Samoa.

== Controversies ==
The firm had allegedly helped foreign citizens circumvent their local tax laws and sometimes even international sanctions. The firm's founder argued that it simply helps its clients achieve privacy, and that it complied with "know your customer" regulations. On 20 October 2020, Germany issued international arrest warrants for the two founders of the firm.

=== Argentine money laundering ===
In 2014, MF Corporate Services was subpoenaed by a hedge fund seeking to recover money from the Argentinian government. The fund alleged that MF had created shell companies to pass money from the government to Lázaro Báez, an ally of the Kirchner family. Jürgen Mossack testified under oath that M.F. Corporate Services (Nevada) Ltd. had no affiliation with the Panamanian Mossack Fonseca, but the Panama Papers show that it was in fact a wholly owned subsidiary and Mossack Fonseca tried to hide the relationship, ordering emails and other computer footprints deleted. Despite Mossack Fonseca's claim that it did not own MF Corporate Services, a Nevada judge ruled that the subpoena against Mossack Fonseca was valid. The firm was fighting an order that it turn over the details of 123 shell companies created by an associate of a former President of Argentina.

=== Commerzbank ===
In February 2015, the firm was implicated in the German government's investigation of money laundering and tax evasion schemes at Commerzbank.

=== Petrobras ===
In January 2016, employees of the firm's Brazilian office were charged in relation to the ongoing Petrobras corruption scandal. In that case, a judge alleged that "Mossack Fonseca provided services for the opening of offshore societies, and at least four agents were involved in a scheme to launder money." The firm has responded that the Brazilian office is a "franchise" and not controlled by the main office in Panama. The firm's founder resigned from his advisory position to the Panamanian government to focus on the Brazilian allegations, and says the firm has been cleared.

=== Panama Papers leak ===
On 3 April 2016, the German newspaper Süddeutsche Zeitung (SZ) announced that 11.5 million confidential documents from the firm had been leaked to them. These documents, dubbed the Panama Papers, reveal how clients hid billions of dollars in tax havens. Comprising documents dating from the 1970s to the present, the 2.6 terabytes of data was given to SZ in 2015 by an anonymous source. Because of the amount of data, SZ enlisted the help of the Washington-based International Consortium of Investigative Journalists (ICIJ).

The firm says that this coverage has "misrepresented" their work. In its full statement the company asserts that it conducts due diligence on potential clients, "routinely denying services" to those who are "compromised", and "routinely resigns from client engagements" when ongoing due diligence and/or updates to sanctions lists reveal problems. In addition, however, the company has said that responsibility for potential legal violations may lie with failures or lapses by other institutions given that:

approximately 90% of our clientele is comprised of professional clients, such as international financial institutions as well as trust companies and prominent law and accounting firms, who act as intermediaries and are regulated in the jurisdiction of their business. These clients are obliged to perform due diligence on their clients in accordance with the KYC (Know Your Customer) and AML (Anti-money laundering) regulations to which they are subject.

The company informed clients on 3 April 2016, that files had been obtained through a hack of the company's email server. Forbes has suggested that the firm's information security was poor, running old versions of key tools; other vulnerabilities have since been discovered.

Shortly after the leak, Panamanian, Peruvian, and Salvadorian police raided the local offices of Mossack Fonseca.

On 14 March 2018, the firm announced that it would be shutting down as a result of the economic and reputational damage inflicted as a result of the Panama Papers leak, together with what it described as "unusual actions by certain Panamanian authorities".

On 20 October 2020, prosecutors in Cologne, Germany, issued international arrest warrants for firm partners, Panamanian Ramón Fonseca and German-born Jürgen Mossack. With the firm noted as central to the investigation, charges against the two founders include accessory to tax evasion and forming a criminal organization.

The founders of the law firm have been on trial since 26 June 2023 in a court in Panama City for alleged money laundering. The prosecution has asked for up to 12 years in prison for Jürgen Mossack and Ramón Fonseca for concealing assets linked to the Operation Car Wash case. It also requested sentences for 26 other people and the acquittal of four other defendants.

== In popular culture ==
Steven Soderbergh directed a film, The Laundromat, from a screenplay by Scott Z. Burns that was based on the 2017 book written by journalist Jake Bernstein about the Panama Papers investigation, Secrecy World: Inside the Panama Papers Investigation of Illicit Money Networks and the Global Elite (Macmillan), in which actors Gary Oldman and Antonio Banderas portray firm founders Mossack and Fonseca, respectively. The Laundromat premiered at the Venice Film Festival on 1 September 2019, followed by a screening at the Toronto International Film Festival.

After its theatrical release, on 27 September 2019, Netflix began digital streaming of The Laundromat internationally on 18 October 2019, following a failed attempt by the firm's founders to halt its release. In December 2019, in MOSSACK FONSECA & CO., S.A., et al., Plaintiffs, v. NETFLIX INC., a U.S. District Court Judge ruled that the film was understood by audiences to be "fictionalized for dramatization"; did not defame Mossack and Fonseca; and that it was protected under the First Amendment to the United States Constitution as free speech.

== See also ==
- Marc Harris
