= Vasylkivtsi, Ternopil Oblast =

Rural locality in Ternopil Oblast, Ukraine

Vasylkivtsi Васильківці
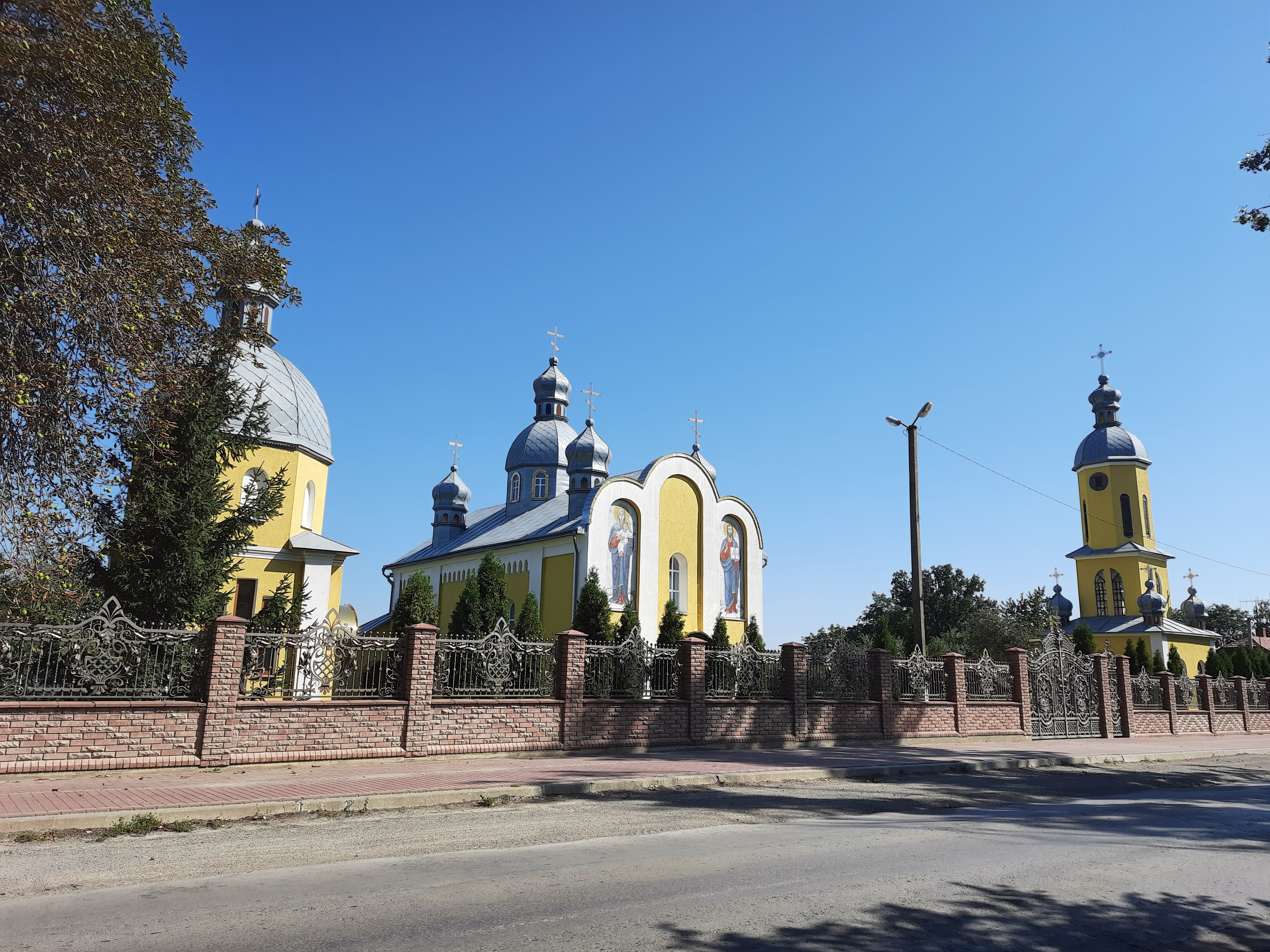
- Church of the Nativity of the Virgin Mary, former Roman Catholic church

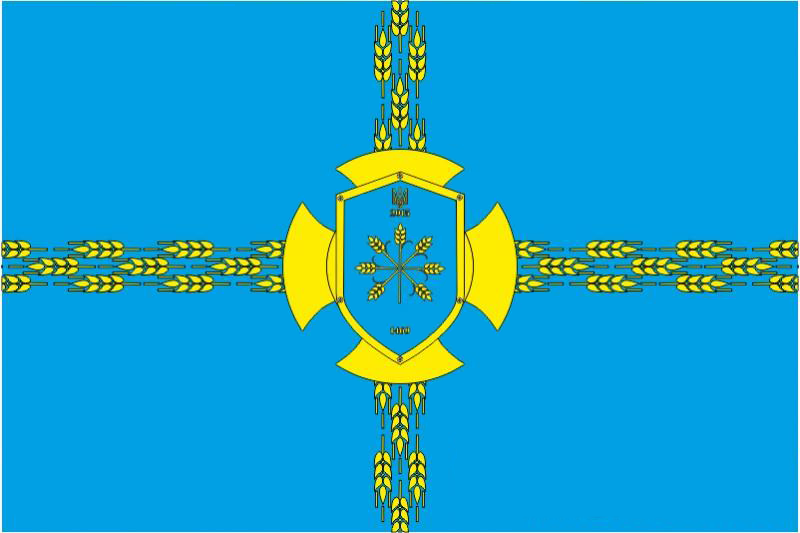
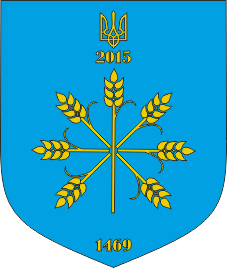
- Flag Coat of arms

- Location in Ternopil Oblast
- Coordinates: 49°5′40″N 26°4′18″E
- Country: Ukraine
- Oblast: Ternopil Oblast
- Raion: Chortkiv Raion
- Hromada: Vasylkivtsi Hromada
- Time zone: UTC+2 (EET)
  - Summer (DST): UTC+3 (EEST)
- Postal code: 48257

Vasylkivtsi (Ukrainian: Васильківці) is a village in Vasylkivtsi rural hromada, Chortkiv Raion, Ternopil Oblast, Ukraine.

== History ==
The first written mention is from 1573.

After the liquidation of the Husiatyn Raion on 19 July 2020, the village became part of the Ternopil Raion.

== Religion ==
- Church of the Nativity of the Virgin Mary (mid-nineteenth century, brick, converted from a Roman Catholic church, OCU)
- Church of the Nativity of the Virgin Mary (1936, brick, UGCC)

== People ==
- Ivan Guta (born 1956), Ukrainian agricultural entrepreneur, Hero of Ukraine
- Mykola Kuchmii (born 1946), poet, local historian, publicist, bard, amateur artist
