= Wills Rangel =

Venezuelan politician

Wills Rangel is a former member of the board of the nationalized Petróleos de Venezuela, S.A. (more familiarly known by its acronym PDVSA, "S.A." being the Spanish corporate equivalent of "Inc."). An elected representative in the National Assembly of Venezuela, he is also the President of the trade unions United Workers Federation of Oil, Gas, and Related Derivatives of Venezuela (Spanish acronym FUPTV) and the Central Bolivariana Socialista de Trabajadores de La Ciudad, El Campo, y La Pesca (CBST-CCP).

Rangels told Reuters regarding negotiations in the aftermath of the 2026 United States strikes in Venezuela that "If they want to buy it, they will have it in due time, sold at the international price. Not the way [Trump] intends, as if that oil belongs to them because we supposedly owe them. We do not owe anything to the United States."
