= Kotsiubyntsi Castle =

- Kotsiubyntsi
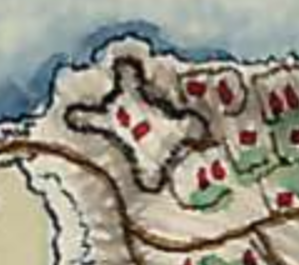
- Kotsiubyntsi Castle on the map by Friedrich von Mieg, 18th century

Site information
- Owner: Ukraine
- Condition: ruined

Location
- Coordinates: 49°04′38″N 25°59′06″E

The Kotsiubyntsi Castle (Ukrainian: Коцюбинський замок, romanized: Kotsiubyns'kyi zamok) is a lost defensive structure in the village of Kotsiubyntsi, Vasylkivtsi rural hromada, Chortkiv Raion, Ternopil Oblast, Ukraine, and a newly discovered archeological site.

== History ==
In 1477, Khan Mengli Gerai burned down Kochubyn, including the castle.

On 26 July 1671, the German traveler Ulrich von Werdum passed through Kotsiubyntsi, and mentioned the local castle in his diary. In 1672, the fortifications were completely destroyed by the Turks returning from Buchach. The fortress was never rebuilt.

In his notes, archaeologist Adam Kirkor noted that only the remains of an earthen rampart have survived, and that the inhabitants were mining clay on the north side. In the early twentieth century, Mykola Bala found a gold chain in the recess, which he sold for 100 "market" rynskas. In the nineteenth century, the Bala family lived on the territory of the bastion and used it for a vegetable garden and outbuildings.

Today, the bastion's territory is divided between the two courtyards of the Patera's and Topolnytskyi's families.

== Owners ==
- Jan Kopiczynski (early seventeenth century)
- Paweł Krenzelewski (1614)
- Elżbieta and Kateryna Krenzelewski (1632)

== Sources ==
- Гринюка Б. Коцюбинці та Чагарі: історико-краєзнавчий нарис, Тернопіль : Осадца Ю.В., 2019, s. 20–23, ISBN 978-617-7516-81-0.
- Гринюка, Б. Малодосліджений бастіон села Коцюбинці, Замки Тернопільщини: проблеми ревіталізації та пристосування (м. Збараж, 3 грудня 2020 р.), Збараж, 2020, s. 56–62.
