= Saint Michael Church, Kotsiubyntsi =

Greek Catholic church in Kotsiubyntsi, Ukraine

Saint Michael Church Церква святого архистратига Михаїла
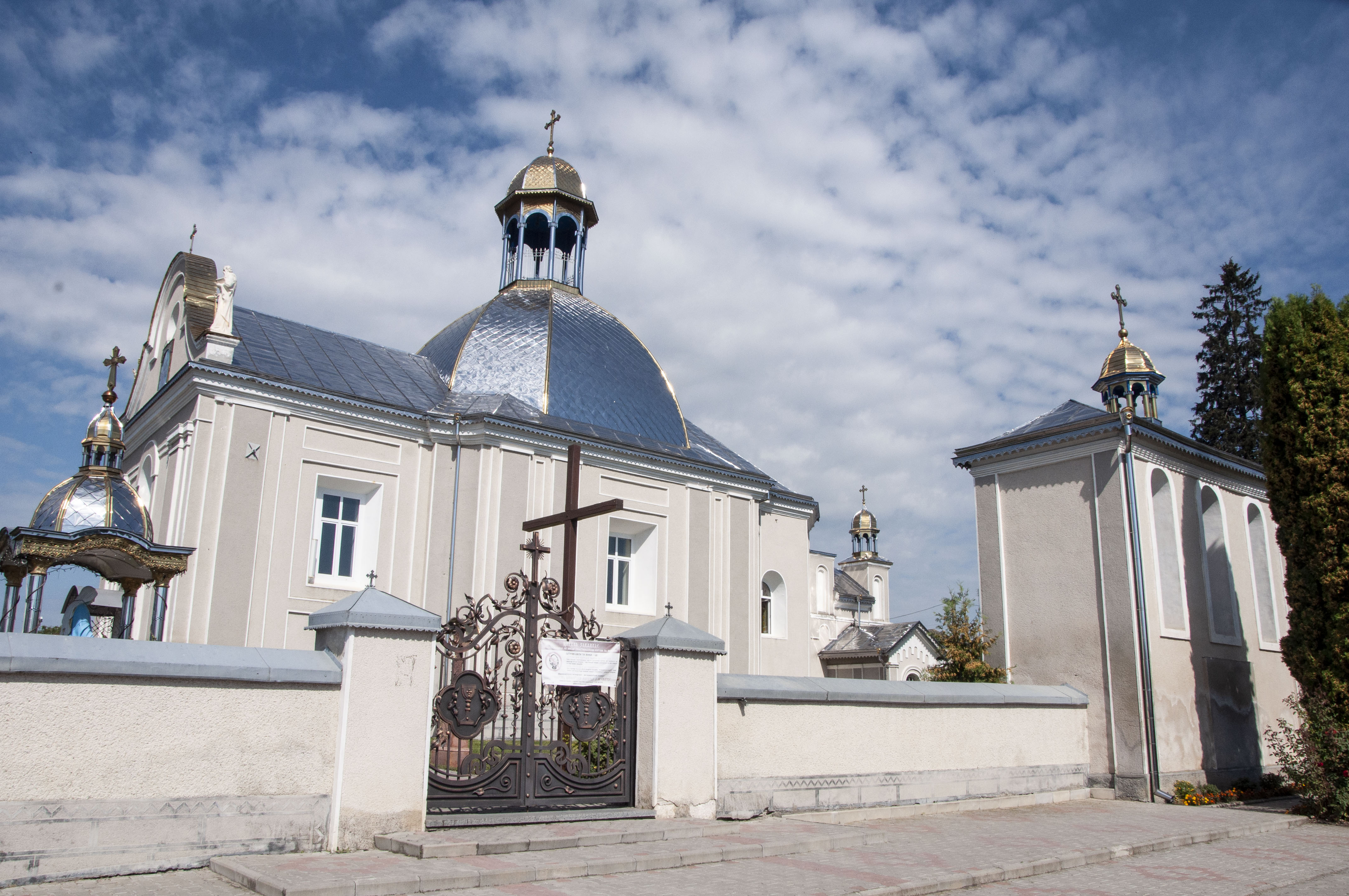

- Location within Ternopil Oblast

Religion
- Affiliation: Ukrainian Greek Catholic Church

Location
- Location: Kotsiubyntsi
- Coordinates: 49°04′27.9″N 25°58′36.4″E

Architecture
- Completed: 1799

Saint Michael Church (Ukrainian: Церква святого архистратига Михаїла) is a Greek Catholic parish church (UGCC) in Kotsiubyntsi of the Vasylkivtsi rural hromada of the Chortkiv Raion of the Ternopil Oblast, and an architectural monument of local importance.

== History ==
In 1563–1564, the parish was mentioned, which was then subordinated to the Chortkiv governorate of the Galician wing. In 1684 and 1686, the parish paid 5 zlotys of church tax.

In 1706 a wooden church was built, which was covered with shingles in 1805; in 1842 a wooden parish house was built. In 1876, archaeologist Adam Kirkor noted that a wooden church with a cemetery was located on the square called the Old Cemetery. At the end of the eighteenth century it was dismantled in connection with the opening of a stone church. In 1882, the church was painted with donations from the owner of the village, Oskar Horodynskyi, and parishioners.

On 12 December 1912, in the inventory book, at. Vitold Bylynskyi wrote: "The church of St. Arch. Michael was built by the ktetor Anton Korczak Gorodynsky, owner of Kotsiubyntsi, in the year of God 1799. The temple was painted in 1882 by Oskar Horodynskyi, the collator and father of the Hirekhodnyk F. Holypatyi and frequent citizens of the place, painted by K. Khomyk". In 1915, a fire destroyed the shingle roof of the church; it was restored in 1921.

In the 1950s, major repairs were carried out.

In 1706–1946 the church and parish belonged to the UGCC. In 1991, the church and parish returned to the Ukrainian Greek Catholic Church.

In 1991–1992, the church was re-painted by Vasyl Navizivskyi. After the painting, the church was consecrated by at. Tymofii Bushtynskyi with the blessing of Bishop Sofron Dmyterko. In 2003, the iconostasis was made by Roman Paniiko. On 17 January 2016, Bishop Dmytro Hryhorak of the Buchach Eparchy visited the parish.

The parish has the following organizations: The Candle Brotherhood, the Pope's Worldwide Prayer Network, and the Altar Guard. Catechesis is conducted in the church by a priest.

== Priests ==
- at. Yan Yaroshevych (1760–1810),
- at. Yosyf Lukashevych (1810),
- at. Symeon Lukashevych (1836–1841),
- at. Fylyp Holynatyi (1841–1893)
- at. Vitold Bylynskyi (1893–1913),
- at. Ivan Valnytskyi (1913–1924),
- at. Petro Tomashevskyi (1924–1942),
- at. Oliiar,
- at. Mykhailo Klym (1942–),
- at. Ivan Stakhun (1958–?),
- at. Bohdanets,
- at. Vasyl Halias,
- at. Vasyl Hrytsai (1963–1969),
- at. Yaroslav Rokitskyi (1969–1978),
- at. Vasyl Halas,
- at. Hryhorii Petryshyn (1978–1981),
- at. Ivan Tsviakh (1981–1990),
- at. Ihor Mohun (since October 1990).

== Sources ==
- (in Ukrainian) Мельничук Б., Уніят В., Щавінський, В., Коцюбинці // Ternopil Oblast. History of cities and villages: in 3 v. / Ternopil: "Terno-graph", 2014, V. 2: Г—Л, S. 70—72. — ISBN 978-966-457-228-3.
- "Kociubińce". Geographical Dictionary of the Kingdom of Poland (in Polish). 4. Warszawa: Kasa im. Józefa Mianowskiego. 1883. p. 232.
- Гринюка Б. Коцюбинці та Чагарі: історико-краєзнавчий нарис, Тернопіль : Осадца Ю.В., 2019, s. 90–136, ISBN 978-617-7516-81-0.
- Гринюка, Б. Особливості релігійного життя в селі Коцюбинці у радянський період (1944–1991 рр.), Церква – наука – суспільство: питання взаємодії. Матеріали п'ятнадцятої міжнародної наукової конференції, Київ, 2017, s. 96–102.
