= Suisse Secrets =

Credit Suisse leak in 2022

Suisse Secrets was a leak of banking data detailing more than CHF 100 billion (roughly US$108.5bn, €95.5bn or £80bn) held in nominee accounts linked to over 30,000 clients of Credit Suisse, the largest ever leak from a major Swiss bank. It revealed that autocrats, oligarchs, war criminals, human traffickers and drug dealers had accounts with Credit Suisse, a failure of the bank to apply due diligence. Swiss media was disallowed from publishing any investigatory work due to strict banking secrecy laws, which brought up their collective concern that such laws run contrary to freedom of the press.

== Background ==
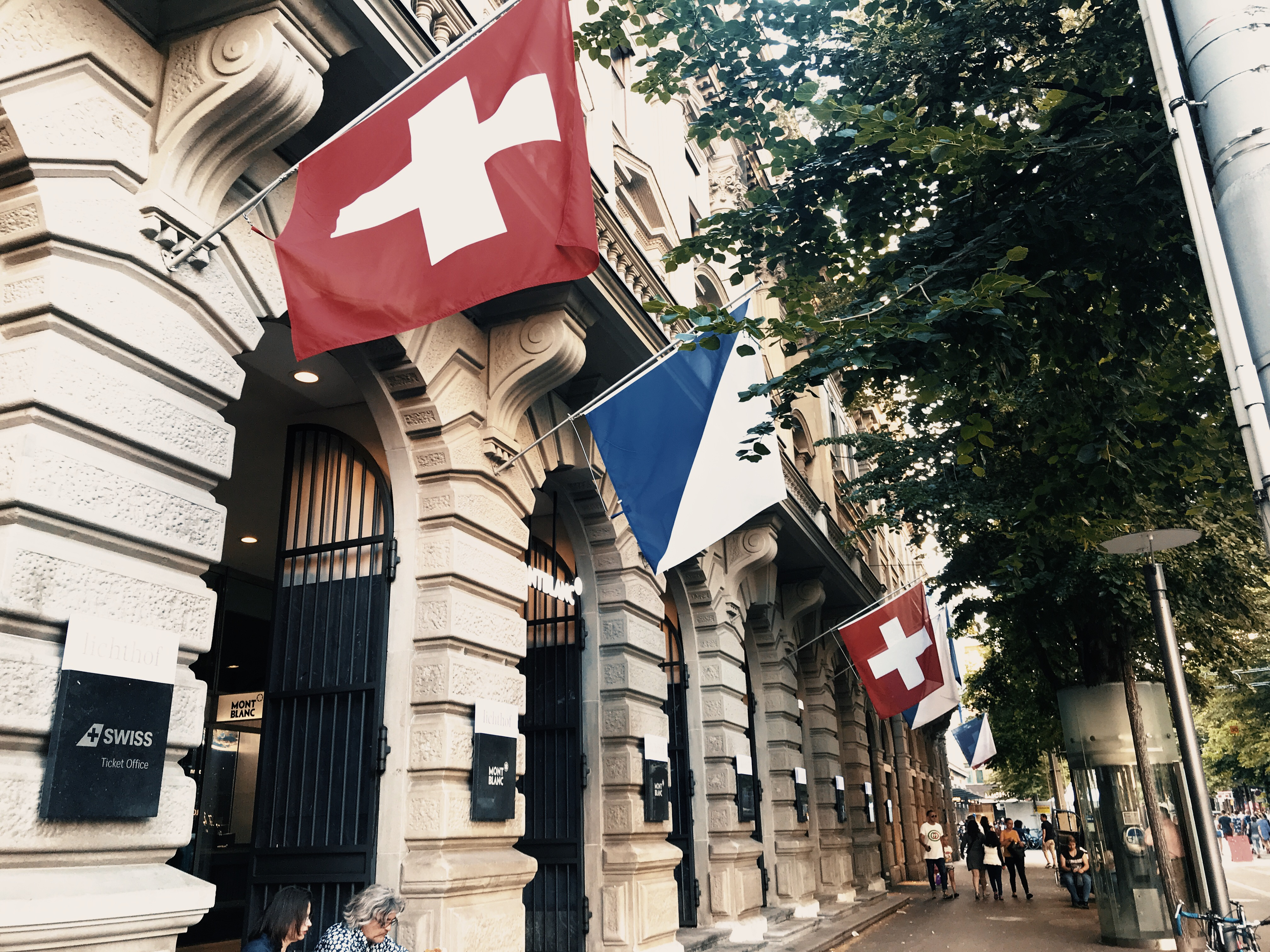
Credit Suisse headquarters in Zurich

On 20 February 2022, the Süddeutsche Zeitung reported that "over a year ago" it had received secret data through a secure digital mailbox on more than 30,000 Credit Suisse bank customers and their more than 18,000 accounts, which provide insights into the inner workings of the banking giant. The data were evaluated by 48 media companies from all over the world, among them the Organized Crime and Corruption Reporting Project, The Guardian, The New York Times and Le Monde. Swiss news organizations did not participate in the investigation because a Swiss law concerning bank secrecy forbids the publication of banking secrets. The data covers accounts and transactions from the 1940s up to 2010.

=== Statement of the source ===
The data were leaked anonymously by a person or group, who wrote in an accompanying statement, that they felt Swiss banking secrecy laws were "immoral", that "Swiss banks ..[were] collaborators of tax evaders", because "a significant number of these accounts were opened with the sole purpose of hiding their holder's wealth from fiscal institutions and/or avoiding the payment of taxes on capital gains". They opined that Common Reporting Standards were a step in the right direction, but imposed "a disproportionate financial and infrastructural burden on developing nations", which "enables corruption and starves developing countries of much-needed tax revenue". The source stated that "responsibility for this state of affairs does not lie with Swiss banks but rather with the Swiss legal system".

== Notable people named ==
As a result of the leak, numerous people allegedly involved in crimes ranging from corruption and bribery to drug and human trafficking became known as Credit Suisse clients.

- King Abdullah II of Jordan and Queen Rania of Jordan
- Aliaksei Aleksin, Belarusian businessman blacklisted by the EU and US, close associate of Alexander Lukashenko
- Ayad Allawi, former Deputy Prime Minister, Iraq
- Hashim Jawan Bakht, Pakistani politician
- Aziz Mohammad Bhai, Bangladesh businessman and convicted murderer
- Haji Saifullah Khan Bangash, Pakistani politician
- Louis Alphonse de Bourbon, Spanish-French aristocrat, and his wife Margarita Vargas
- Abdelaziz Bouteflika, Algerian autocrat
- Anas el-Fiqqi, Egypt, former Minister of Information
- Ivan Guta, Ukrainian agricultural baron
- Abdul Halim Khaddam, Syrian politician
- Zahid Ali Akbar Khan, Pakistani general and engineering officer
- Waqar Ahmed Khan, Pakistani politician
- Sultan Ali Lakhani, Pakistani businessman
- Luis Carlos de León, former financial director of La Electricidad de Caracas, a subsidiary of Venezuela's state oil firm PDVSA
- Pavlo Lazarenko, former Prime Minister of Ukraine
- Bidzina Ivanishvili, Georgian Oligarch and Political figure
- Ronald Li, founder of the Hong Kong Stock Exchange
- Ferdinand Marcos, former President of the Philippines
- Imelda Marcos, former First Lady of the Philippines
- Hisham Talaat Moustafa, Egyptian real estate magnate
- Gamal Mubarak and Alaa Mubarak, sons of former President of Egypt Hosni Mubarak
- Sa'ad Khair, Jordanian intelligence chief
- Rana Mubashir, Pakistani journalist
- Khaled Nezzar, General and former Defense Minister of Algeria
- Akhtar Abdur Rahman, former Chairman Joint Chiefs of Staff Committee of Pakistan
- Billy Rautenbach, Zimbabwean businessman
- Qosim Rohbar, former governor of Sughd and former Minister of Agriculture of Tajikistan
- Rodoljub Radulović, Serbian drug lord
- Hussein Salem, Egyptian businessman and advisor to Hosni Mubarak
- Armen Sarkissian, former President of Armenia
- Eduard Seidel, German businessman
- Álvaro Sobrinho, Angolan businessman
- James Soong, Taiwanese politician implicated in the Taiwan frigate scandal
- Omar Suleiman, former Vice-President of Egypt and former head of the Egyptian General Intelligence Directorate
- Nadezhda Tokayeva, former first lady of Kazakhstan
- Vasif Talibov, de facto leader of the Azerbaijani exclave of Nakhchivan
- Antonio Velardo, money launderer for two families of the Calabrian 'Ndrangheta
- Nervis Villalobos, Venezuelan energy minister under Hugo Chavez, part of massive bribery scheme
- Bruno Wang, Taiwanese fugitive implicated in the Taiwan frigate scandal

A documentary also mentioned Hugo Chavez's bodyguard Carlos Luis Aguilera Borjas, who later became head of the secret police as having 8 million CHF in a Credit Suisse account. As of 2022 he was being sought in Andorra. He owned 100 million in a Compagnie Bancaire Helvetique account. Roberto Rincon had seven accounts with Credit Suisse.

== Reactions ==
On 20 February 2022, Credit Suisse said it "strongly reject[ed]" allegations of wrongdoing. and that 90% of the reviewed accounts were closed or were in the process of closure, so this was largely historical, and that "the accounts of these matters are based on partial, selective information taken out of context, resulting in tendentious interpretations". Credit Suisse alleged it was "a coup against the Swiss banking industry" as a whole without saying who might be behind it.

The Swiss Bankers Association said "The Swiss financial centre has no interest in money of dubious origin. It attaches the greatest importance to the maintenance of its reputation and integrity."

The Swiss Financial Market Supervisory Authority said it was in contact with Credit Suisse.

In February 2022, the European People's Party of the European Parliament proposed reviewing Swiss banking practices and money laundering status in response to the leaks, asking the European Commission to reclassify Switzerland as a high-risk country for financial crime. Liam Proud wrote in Reuters, "stability and unimpeachable competence [...] seem to be lacking at Credit Suisse".

Since leaking financial data is a criminal offense in Switzerland (even if it is in the public interest) punishable with up to five years in jail, Swiss media argued in February 2022 that the banking secrecy law runs contrary to freedom of speech and freedom of the press in some cases.

== Context ==
Credit Suisse has long provided loans to fund billionaires' private jet purchases. In 2014, it started funding jet purchases as well. In 2021, it granted $2 billion in loans to its "ultra-high-net-worth" clients, namely tycoons and oligarchs. Increasingly US sanctions were enacted against Russian oligarchs, and in 2017 and 2018, 12 clients defaulted. In May 2018, it was reported that Oleg Deripaska had to return three private jets owned by Credit Suisse and Raiffeisen. In 2019, it was reported that the $25 million and $15 million jets owned respectively by Arkady Rotenberg and Boris Romanovich Rotenberg were placed on sale by Credit Suisse.

In 2021, Credit Suisse had made a risk transfer by opening up this risk of default to hedge funds. It offered the clients assets of "jets, yachts, real estate and/or financial assets" as security, paying a 11% interest rate.

On 2 March 2022, it became known that Credit Suisse had asked its investors to destroy documents linked to the securisation of yacht loans of oligarchs.

== See also ==
- Banking in Switzerland
- Offshore Leaks, 2013
- LuxLeaks, 2014
- Swiss Leaks, 2015 involving HSBC
- Bahamas Leaks, 2016
- Football Leaks, 2016
- Panama Papers, 2016
- Paradise Papers, 2017
- Pandora Papers, 2021
