= Deltaven =

DELTAVEN
- Founded: 1976
- Owner: PDVSA

Deltaven is a subsidiary of the state-owned Petróleos de Venezuela (PDVSA) whose activity is the marketing of fuels, lubricants, solvents, asphalt, greases and other hydrocarbon derivatives under the PDV trademark. Although this activity is fundamentally restricted to the Venezuelan market, the PDV brand is also known in the rest of Latin America through the commercial network of Citgo International Latin America (CILA).

== History ==
Deltaven was created in 1976 to assume control of the operations that the concessionaire company Texaco carried out in Venezuela until that year, mainly the operation of the Tucupita refinery, in the Delta Amacuro state. This refinery was closed, thus complying with a resource rationalization plan designed by the parent company PDVSA, at the end of 1976. The following year, the Venezuelan Petroleum Corporation absorbed all the assets of Deltaven, which suspended its commercial activities until 1997. That year, there was a merger of the state companies Corpoven, Lagoven and Maraven, which marketed fuels, lubricants and other derived products independently. Deltaven assumes control of all the assets belonging to these three companies, as well as the distribution network that they managed. The PDV commercial brand was created, which also maintains a presence in the main network of gasoline stations in Venezuela for automobiles and in 16 Venezuelan airports to supply commercial aviation companies.

== Absorb ==
In 1997, a new Organic Hydrocarbons Law allowed the opening of the Venezuelan internal market to private investors for some areas of the oil market. That year the Monagas Fuel Corporation (CCM) was founded, then in 1998 some companies such as Betapetrol and Trébol Gas were born, in 2000 Llanopetrol began operations, and in 2001 Petrocanarias and Corporación La Petrólea all with Venezuelan capital, in addition to the transnational Texaco, ExxonMobil, BP, and Shell.

== Crisis ==
The fuel shortage in Venezuela refers to the lack of gasoline supply in Venezuela since 2014, where gasoline is the main fuel used by motor vehicles to transport passengers and products. The shortage of domestic propane gas used in Venezuelan homes for food preparation has also become evident during this crisis, to the extent that firewood has been used for cooking.

The Deltaven's fuel service station (majority) is closed due to crisis of fuel, despite having the largest oil reserves in the world, Venezuela is experiencing a shortage of solvents to refine its own crude oil and thus be able to supply its fuel in the domestic market. It is the South American country that has the most refineries among its neighbors with a total of six among them one of the largest in the world. During the administration of Nicolás Maduro, the country has experienced a chronic shortage of gasoline since 2014 due to various factors: disinvestment and lack of maintenance of refineries in the country; loss of national crude oil production; shortage of qualified technical personnel; politicization of the industry; corruption and politically motivated fixing of retail prices for years, which has led to loss-making production. In 2019, the Maduro government has blamed the production crisis on the corruption of former managers and "imperialist aggression."

In early 2018, gasoline shortages began to spread in several regions of the country with reports of long lines of drivers waiting for refueling. The fuel shortage crisis began in the first half of 2018 and worsened throughout since the coronavirus pandemic in March 2020.

=== General Strike ===
The general strike of 2002-03, whose original objective was political to request the resignation of Hugo Chávez by approving 49 decree laws in 2001, making use of the new powers of the Enabling Law without consulting the unions, among which is the "Land and Agricultural Development Law", the "Hydrocarbons Law", the "Fisheries Law", resulted in the paralysis of the country's oil industry, causing nationwide fuel shortages for three weeks in January 2003. Unlike previous strikes over pay, this one included substantial portions of the workforce. operational, including marine flotilla captains for not agreeing with the company's new directive. A few days later the company was paralyzed. Oil production fell by a third. Closed service stations and long lines to obtain fuel were reported in almost the entire country.

== See also ==
- PDVSA
