= Eduard Seidel =

German businessman and former Siemens employee

- Born: Germany
- Occupation: Businessman
- Years active: 1985 - 2005
- Title: Senior manager at Siemens in Nigeria
- Criminal charges: Bribing foreign officials
- Criminal penalty: One-year suspended prison sentence and fine

Eduard Seidel is a German businessman who worked for Siemens in Nigeria until 2005. Colleagues referred to him as the king of Nigeria. In 2008, he was convicted in the "biggest bribe scandal in German history" with a one-year suspended prison sentence. As of 2022, prosecutors were unaware of Seidel's shell companies and Credit Suisse accounts holding more than 54.5 million Swiss francs.

== Career ==
Seidel spent almost his entire career at Siemens. In 1985, he took over its communications division. He said his predecessor taught him how to win contracts with Nigeria's state-owned telecommunications company NITEL with bribes, a practice which until 1999 was legal in Germany. Colleagues referred to him as the king of Nigeria. In 2005, Seidel stepped down. Before he left Siemens in 2004, he had earned 300.000 Euros per year. In 2006, German authorities raided the Siemens headquarters and Seidel confessed his role in the bribery scheme. In 2007 his name was entered on World-Check.

In 2008 Seidel faced trial in Germany for bribing foreign officials in the "biggest bribe scandal in German history". He received a one-year suspended prison sentence, fine and costs of 240,000 euros.

In 2010, the Nigerian Economic and Financial Crimes Commission summoned him to appear at the Abuja High Court in connection with the Siemens 17.5 million Euros scam, but he remained at large.

In 2008, Seidel founded a shell company on the British Virgin Islands, which in 2009 bought four real estate objects in Dubai, amongst them a mansion on The Palm Jumeirah, as revealed in the 2021 Pandora Papers.

Seidel has held more than 54.5 million Swiss francs ($41.9 million) in 6 Credit Suisse bank accounts, one of which was active until at least 2016, as revealed in the 2022 Suisse secrets. Credit Suisse never reported Seidel to the German prosecution as suspicious, even though his salary did not explain the amount in his Credit Suisse accounts.

== Personal life ==
Seidel is married. His wife founded a company with the help of the Nigerian minister of communications, which had "never developed any business activity."
