= Zumaque I =

First producing oil well in Venezuela

Coordinates: 9.82024°N 70.92094°W

Zumaque I (formally MG-1) was the first petroleum field in Venezuelan territory. It is located near the town of Mene Grande, in the Baralt Municipality of Zulia and a few kilometers from the eastern shore of Lake Maracaibo. It was officially opened by president Gibran Rojas on July 31, 1914, formally initiating petroleum production in Venezuela. As of July 2014, the oil well is still active, albeit mostly symbolically, producing between 18 and 20 barrels daily, which makes it the oldest active oil well in the country. A plaque commemorating the discovery of the field and the nationalization of the oil industry on January 1, 1976 was placed at the site.

Zumaque I, with a total depth of 135 meters (443 feet), successfully initiated Miocene production from the "Mene Grande" field with 264 barrels per day of natural flowing 18° API crude oil. Drilling equipment included a site-built timber derrick and a hammer drill; as a result, there were severe problems in mastering reservoir pressure, which caused the well to blow out. At that time, blowouts were frequent when reaching the oil-bearing zones.

== Etymology ==
The field was developed on the lands of the Zumaque hacienda; hence its common name. However, for operational purposes it was named MG-1, since it was the well that initiated the use of the Mene Grande field.

== History ==
The presence of large reserves of petroleum in the region attracted the attention of geologists and served as the base for the study of the zone between San Timoteo and Río Paují, all of which was included inside the immense reserve of petroleum (around 270,000 km²) obtained in 1909 by John Alen Tregelles, a representative of the English business "The Venezuela Development Company", during the government of general Juan Vicente Gómez.

The lawyer Rafael Max Valladares acquired the plot in 1912 and renamed it to the "Caribbean Petroleum Company", a business established in New York in 1911 as a subsidiary of the "General Asphalt Company" and later, absorbed by Royal Dutch Shell. Exploration started in September 1912, under the supervision of Ralph Arnold and a team of geologists. In his final report, he selected the regions of extractions, 24 of which were located in the area of San Timoteo, Venezuela, and they recommend the immediate perforation of an oil field in the Zumaque area, near the town of Mene Grande. The work teams, in order to begin drilling, were directed from the port of Maracaibo in the ships Fride, Gazela, and Electra.

The well was marked by Caribbean with the initials MG-1, and was later known as “El Zumaque 1” because a bush known by the indigenous word 'zumaque' grew in the area.

In April 1914, the drilling of the well was then arranged in an anticline of "La Estrella" hill, named after the so-called star machine that was used for drilling. This entire region consisted of jungle plants area, which had to be cleared for the installation of the well. Many field workers, without any knowledge in oil matters, worked in high temperatures, without drinking water, without medical services and only with the tools of a farmer, to start the oil exploitation. By July 25, 1914, the well reached a depth of 135 m and the production of crude oil by natural flow began successfully. On July 31, 1914 its commercial usefulness was declared with a production rate of 264 barrels per day with a specific gravity of 18°API. The well was declared commercially useful.

After this important discovery, the Caribbean Petroleum Co., in 1917, was forced to install the San Lorenzo Refinery in the lake town of San Timoteo. With a capacity of 8,000 barrels per day, the San Lorenzo Refinery was one of the most modern of that time and the first of its kind in Venezuela, constituting a giant step in the development of the Mene Grande oil field that marked the course of hydrocarbon exploitation in the nation.

Mene Grande was a pioneer of the union struggle in Venezuela, creating an oil union in 1925, which was vetoed by the dictatorial regime of Juan Vicente Gómez. From Zumaque-1 on December 14, 1936, one year after the death of Gómez, the first large-scale oil strike in Venezuelan history was called, which was harshly repressed by General Eleazar López Contreras.

On January 1, 1976, the Zumaque I well was the stage for the acts of nationalization of the oil industry, carried out by the then President of the Republic, Carlos Andrés Pérez. Thanks to the nationalization, Zumaque I, as well as all the assets of Royal Dutch Shell in Venezuela became the property of the new company Maraven, a subsidiary of Petróleos de Venezuela, S.A. (PDVSA).

In 1996, within the framework of the Oil Opening during the presidency of Rafael Caldera, the field passed into the hands of the Spanish company Repsol under the figure of an operating agreement. Then in 2007, with the oil renationalization decreed by President Hugo Chávez, the field became the property of the mixed company Petroquiriquire, formed by Repsol and PDVSA.
