= Zhabyntsi, Ternopil Oblast =

Rural locality in Ternopil Oblast, Ukraine

Zhabyntsi Жабинці
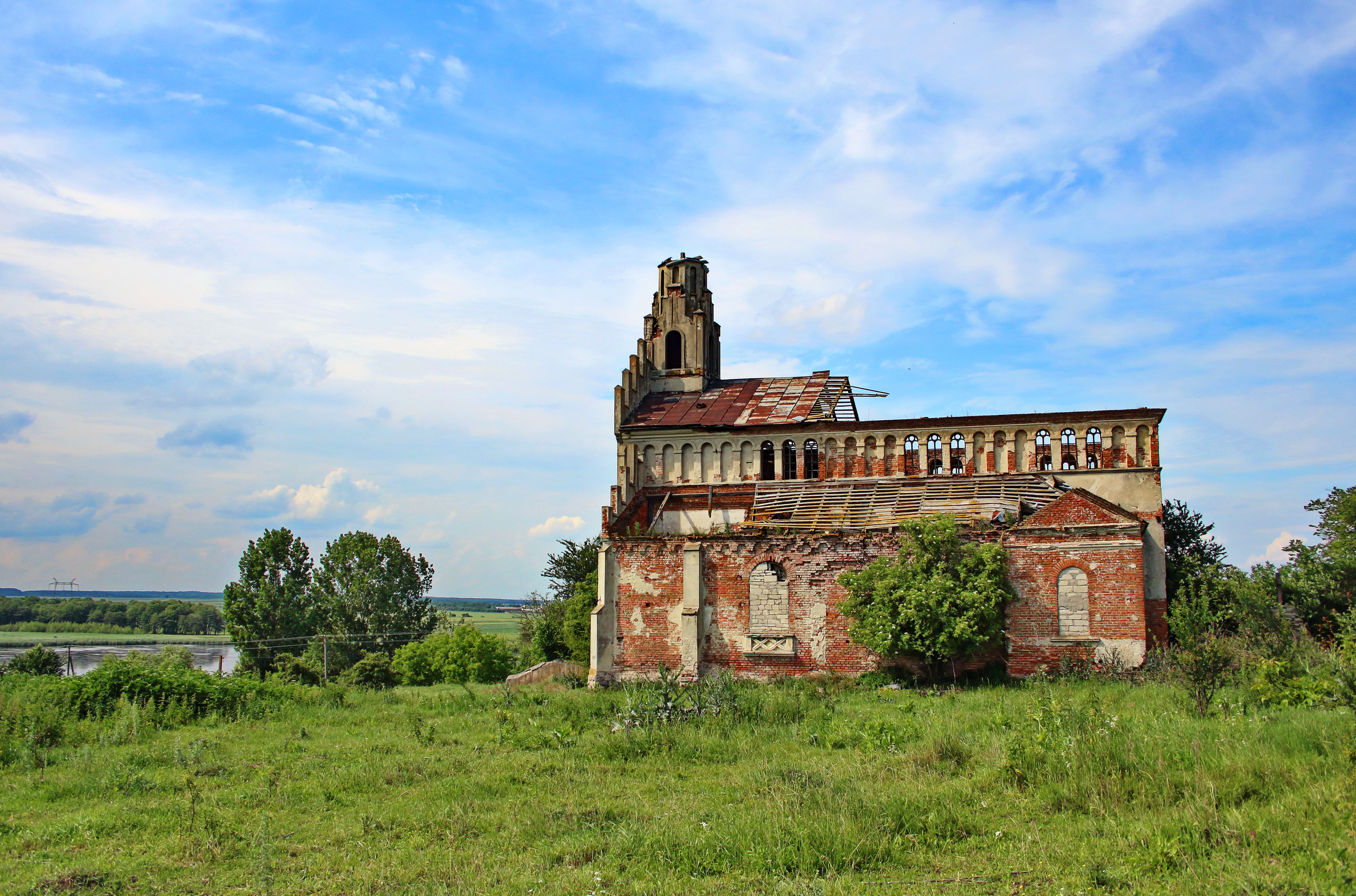
- Church of the Nativity of the Virgin Mary

- Location in Ternopil Oblast
- Coordinates: 49°02′39″N 25°58′31″E
- Country: Ukraine
- Oblast: Ternopil Oblast
- Raion: Chortkiv Raion
- Hromada: Vasylkivtsi Hromada
- Time zone: UTC+2 (EET)
  - Summer (DST): UTC+3 (EEST)
- Postal code: 48271

Zhabyntsi (Ukrainian: Жабинці) is a village in Vasylkivtsi rural hromada, Chortkiv Raion, Ternopil Oblast, Ukraine.

== History ==
In Polish written sources, the settlement was first mentioned in 1443 as Staryi Yaroslav, which had the attributes of a city: a castle, town hall, and zemstvo court.

Around 1600 the village was officially called Zhabyntsi.

Remains of Trypillian and Rus' settlements have been discovered in the area during the 19th century.

After the liquidation of the Husiatyn Raion on 19 July 2020, the village became part of the Ternopil Raion.

== Religion ==
- Church of the Intercession (1906, brick, UGCC)
- Church of the Nativity of the Virgin Mary (1777, RCC)
