= Chabarivka =

Rural locality in Ternopil Oblast, Ukraine

Chabarivka Чабарівка
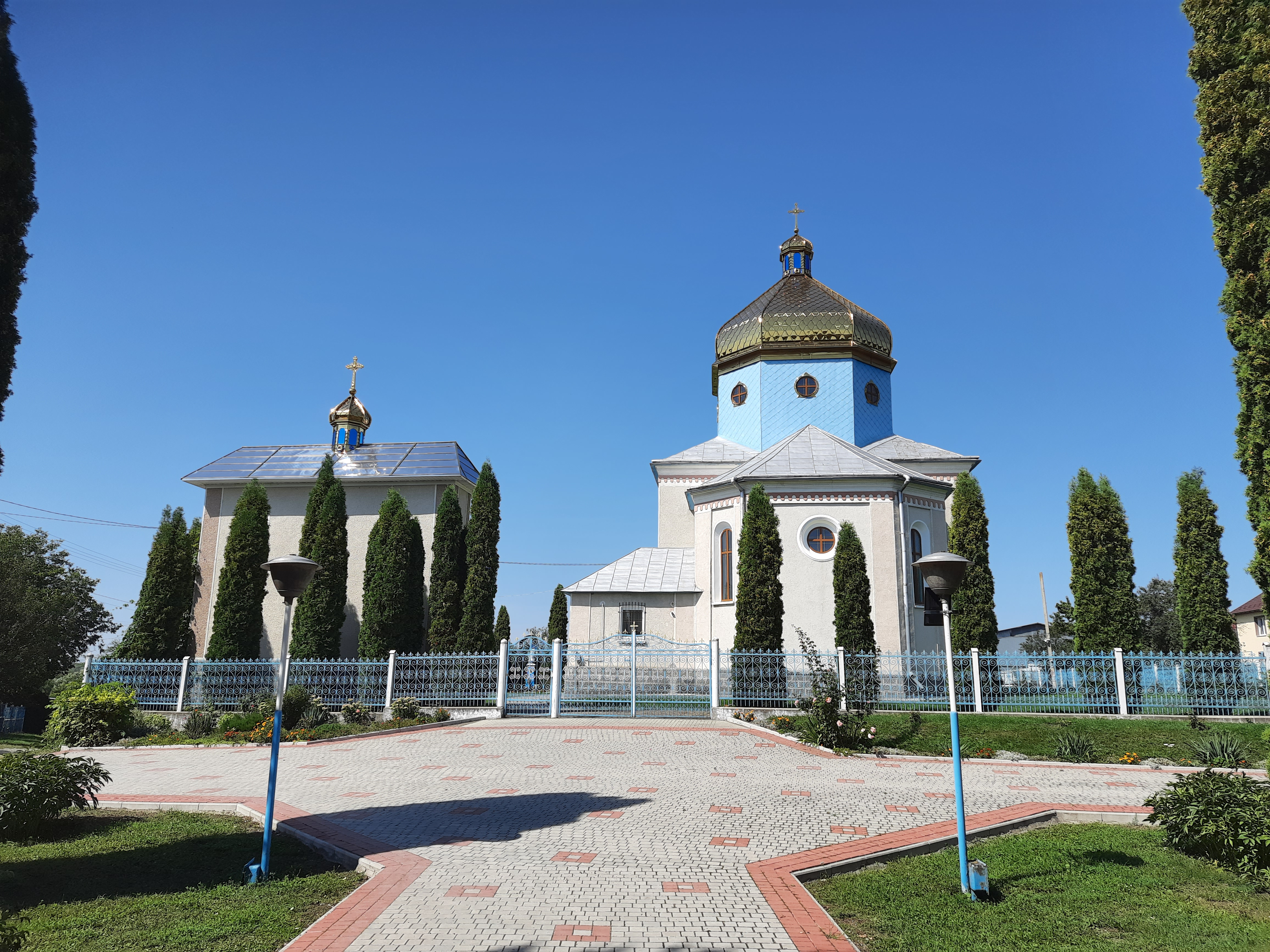
- Saint Michael church

- Location in Ternopil Oblast
- Coordinates: 49°4′52″N 26°7′13″E
- Country: Ukraine
- Oblast: Ternopil Oblast
- Raion: Chortkiv Raion
- Hromada: Vasylkivtsi Hromada
- Time zone: UTC+2 (EET)
  - Summer (DST): UTC+3 (EEST)
- Postal code: 48258

Chabarivka (Ukrainian: Чабарівка) is a village in Vasylkivtsi rural hromada, Chortkiv Raion, Ternopil Oblast, Ukraine.

== History ==
The first written mention of the village was made in 1559.

After the liquidation of the Husiatyn Raion on 19 July 2020, the village became part of the Ternopil Raion.

== Religion ==
- Saint Michael church (1886, UGCC, brick)
- Saint Michael church (1934, RCC)
