= Staryi Nyzhbirok =

Rural locality in Ternopil Oblast, Ukraine

Staryi Nyzhbirok Старий Нижбірок
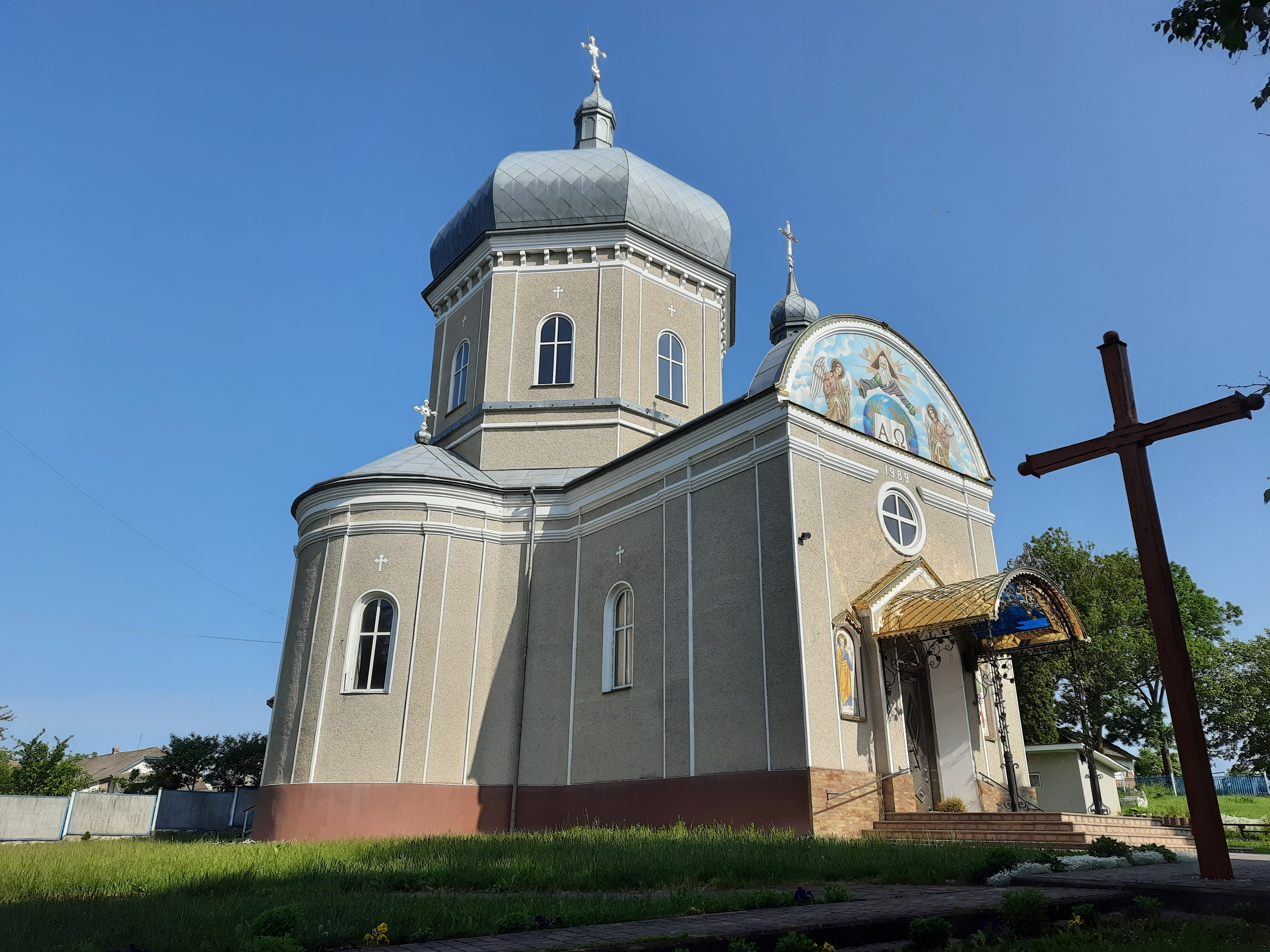
- Saints Peter and Paul church

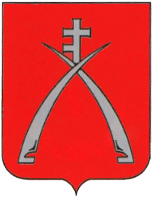
- Coat of arms

- Location in Ternopil Oblast
- Coordinates: 49°8′25″N 26°3′11″E
- Country: Ukraine
- Oblast: Ternopil Oblast
- Raion: Chortkiv Raion
- Hromada: Vasylkivtsi Hromada
- Time zone: UTC+2 (EET)
  - Summer (DST): UTC+3 (EEST)
- Postal code: 48252

Staryi Nyzhbirok (Ukrainian: Старий Нижбірок) is a village in Vasylkivtsi rural hromada, Chortkiv Raion, Ternopil Oblast, Ukraine.

== History ==
The first written mention of the village dates back to 1554.

After the liquidation of the Husiatyn Raion on 19 July 2020, the village became part of the Ternopil Raion.

== Religion ==
- Saints Peter and Paul church (1992, brick, UGCC)

== People ==
- Ivan Demchyshyn (1948–2009), Ukrainian writer, journalist, local historian
