= Buckeye Bahamas Hub =

Oil terminal in The Bahamas

The Buckeye Bahamas Hub terminal (BBH) is an oil and petroleum products marine terminal located just west of Freeport, The Bahamas, and is owned by Buckeye Partners. Also known as the Borco terminal, the terminal became operational in 1965, and was originally founded and named after the Bahamas Oil Refining Company International (BORCO). Today, BBH holds 80 tanks with a total capacity of 26,173,000 bbl, making BBH the world's fourth largest marine terminal, and the largest storage terminal facility in the western hemisphere.

Buckeye Bahamas Hub is capable of storing, heating, transshipping, and bunkering fuel oil, crude oil, and various petroleum products. The terminal is strategically located along the Northwest Providence Channel, near the southern tip of Grand Bahama Island, making it an ideal site for transshipping, and terminal operations. It serves trade routes between the Persian Gulf, Northwest Europe, West Africa, and the U.S. Gulf and East coasts, as well as North America's trade with Europe, Latin America, and the Pacific. Furthermore, BBH features a vast oil storage area with around 80 tanks and is equipped with three offshore jetties and an inland dock. These facilities include a total of 8 berths, specifically designed to accommodate the largest ocean-going vessels, including very large and ultra-large crude carriers.

In 1990, Chevron sold the terminal to Petroleos de Venezuela, S.A. Then, in 2008, BORCO was acquired by First Reserve Corporation, which took an 80% stake, and Vopak, which acquired the remaining 20%, in a $571 million deal. In late December 2010, Buckeye Partners purchased an 80% stake in Bahamas Oil Refining Company International (BORCO) from First Reserve Corporation affiliates for $1.36 billion, and purchased the remaining 20% from Vopak in January 2011. This sale netted Vopak $150 million in after-tax profit. Buckeye Partners would rename the BORCO Terminal Buckeye Bahamas Hub.

Buckeye Bahamas Hub is vulnerable to hurricanes - BBH was forced to termperaroly shut down due to Hurricane Irma in 2017, and again in 2019 due to Hurricane Dorian.
