= Nervis Villalobos =

Venezuelan politician

Nervis Gerardo is a Venezuelan politician who was Deputy Minister of Electrical Energy during the presidency of Hugo Chávez. He funnelled almost $25 million and 11.5 million euros through Credit Suisse accounts and 124 million euros through Andorra as part of a PDVSA corruption scheme, commanding bribes from U.S. companies to help them secure lucrative energy contracts with the national oil company. He has been arrested twice. As of 2022, he is facing charges of corruption and money laundering in Spain, Andorra, the U.S. and Venezuela, which have both filed extradition requests.

== Early life and education ==
Villalobos graduated as electrical engineer from the University of Zulia in Maracaibo, Venezuela.

== Career ==
Villalobos worked for a company named Enelven, where he became a manager. During the administration of Alí Rodríguez Araque he rose to general director of Energy in the Venezuelan Ministry of Energy and Mines. When Rafael Ramírez arrived at the ministry, Villalobos became Deputy Minister of Electrical Energy, where he was in charge of plans to increase electricity generation, such as that of La Vueltosa, in the states of Mérida (state) and Táchira. Villalobos was denounced for irregularities in electrical projects, including that of La Vueltosa.

== Investigations ==
According to the 2022 Suisse secrets, by 2008, Villalobos had started to gain an international reputation for dirty dealings. In 2009, the Monaco branch of Credit Suisse had opened an account for him and another one in 2011, through which he funnelled almost $25 million and 11.5 million euros.

In March 2015, El Mundo reported him as part of a group of senior Venezuelan government officials with accounts at the Banco Madrid and Banca Privada d'Andorra, with savings in dollars which pointed to him having received commissions. According to the article, one large commission was paid by the Spanish company Duro Felguera.

In 2016, deputies of the National Assembly of Venezuela questioned the external advisor of the Brazilian company Odebrecht for the then four-year delay of the Tocoma Dam, and subsequently declared seven former electricity ministers politically responsible: Rafael Ramírez, Alí Rodríguez Araque, Jesse Chacón, Argenis Chávez, Javier Alvarado and Nervis Villalobos.

In March 2016, an article of the web portal Sumarium indicated that in February the Anti-Corruption Prosecutor's Office of Spain had opened an investigation into Villalobos, former President Duro Felguera, and Juan Carlos Torres Inclán, for international bribery. An investigation of the website El Español indicated that Villalobos was interrogated at the Anti-Corruption Prosecutor's Office about the oral consultancy contract with Duro Felguera for 46 million euros, where he defended the legality of the contract signed by the business group.

In October 2017, Villalobos was arrested in Spain on a US arrest warrant accusing him of participation in a bribery plan related to Petróleos de Venezuela (PDVSA).

On 13 September 2018 El País reported that Villalobos was prosecuted by a court in Andorra for his link to money laundering in a banking establishment and membership in a network which between 2007 and 2012 collected bribes from companies that later benefited from millionaire awards from PDVSA. According to the Andorran police, Villalobos moved 124 million euros through a dozen deposits in Andorra.

On 14 September 2018 the Provincial Court of Madrid admitted the appeal which the defense of Villalobos filed against his imprisonment issued in May 2018, and he was released on 11 October 2018. Efecto Cocuyo reported that the judge investigated a laundering offence following the transfer of almost seven million dollars between October 2011 and June 2012 to the Bank of Madrid branch in Lisbon, money then partially invested to acquire a house in La Moraleja, an affluent part of Madrid, but the court believed that at the time "it was not clear enough" that the procedure "could lead to a criminal conviction".

In October 2018, Villalobos was arrested because of new evidence in the case on order of the 41 Court of Madrid.

In March 2020, the US government announced charges against Nicolás Maduro and 14 other ruling figures, including Nervis Villalobos.

In March 2021, the Swiss Federal Administrative Court refused to grant Villalobos and his family a residency permit, considering him a "threat to public safety and a risk to the reputation of the nation".
