= Isla Refinery =

Oil Refinery in Curaçao

Coordinates: 12°07′54″N 68°55′56″W

Isla or Shell Refinery
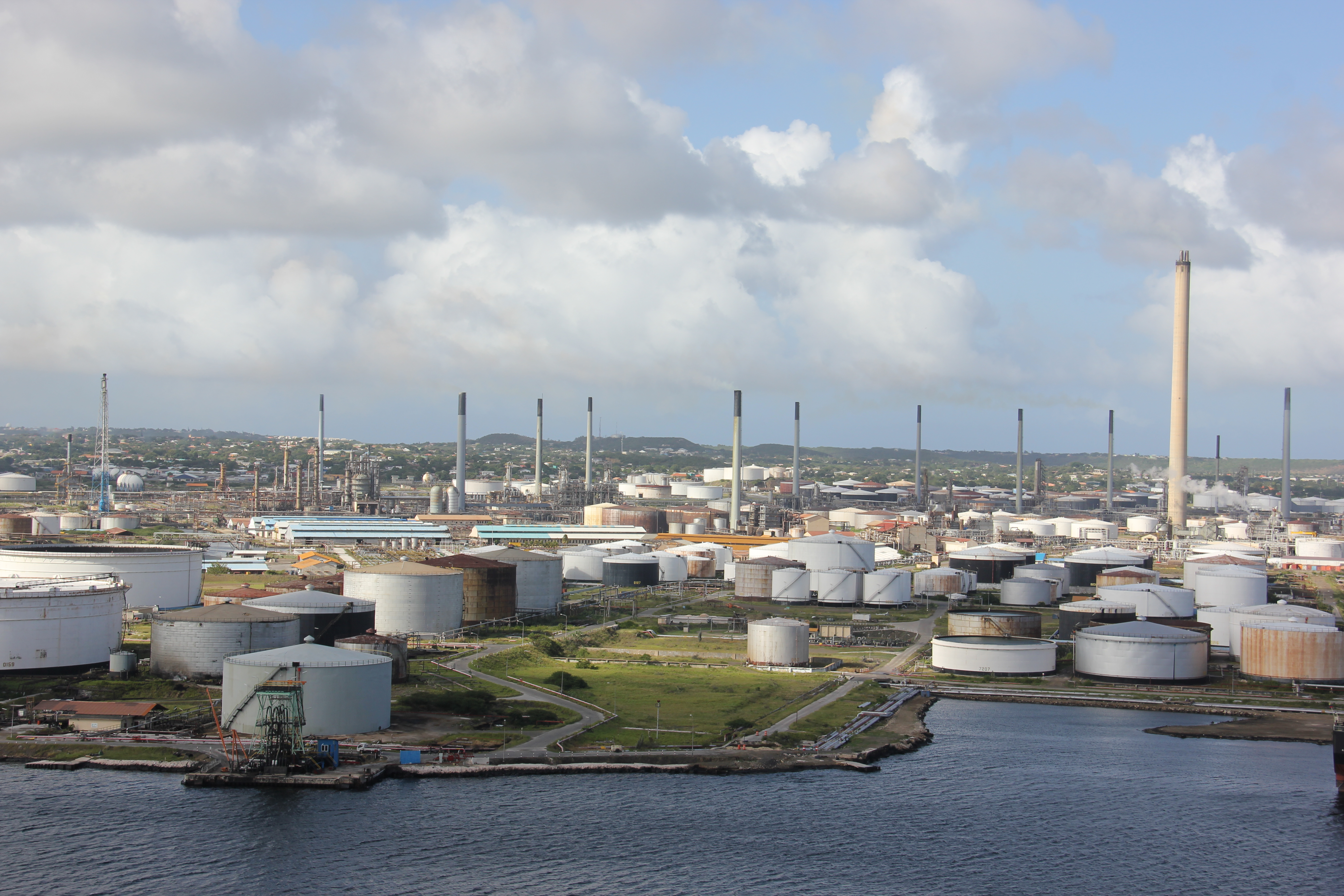
- Interactive map of Isla or Shell Refinery
- Location: Willemstad, Curaçao

Refinery details
- Owner: Government of Curaçao
- Opened: May 23, 1918
- Closed: December 31, 2019
- Area: 13 km
- Capacity: 290,000 barrels per day (46,000 m^{3}/d)
- No. of employees: 300

The Isla Refinery (also known as the Shell Refinery) was a Royal Dutch Shell refinery built in 1915 in the deep-water harbor of Curaçao called Schottegat. The refinery allowed access to process crude oil from the Venezuelan Maracabio Basin. It went out of commission on December 31, 2019, due to heavy American sanctions on Venezuela and a lack of crude feedstock.

== History ==
Isla Refinery (Curaçao)

After the discovery of huge oil reserves in the Maracaibo Basin, the shallow waters blocked deep-draft ocean vessels from transporting crude oil. So the Royal Dutch Shell company saw that the island of Curaçao offered deep harbors also known as the Schottegat, as well as a stable Dutch legal system to put their oil refinery. After Shell acquired the Asiento peninsula, they started construction in 1915 and processed the first oil cargo on May 23, 1918. The company went under the name of Curaçaosche Petroleum Maatschappij (CPM) from 1915 to 1925.

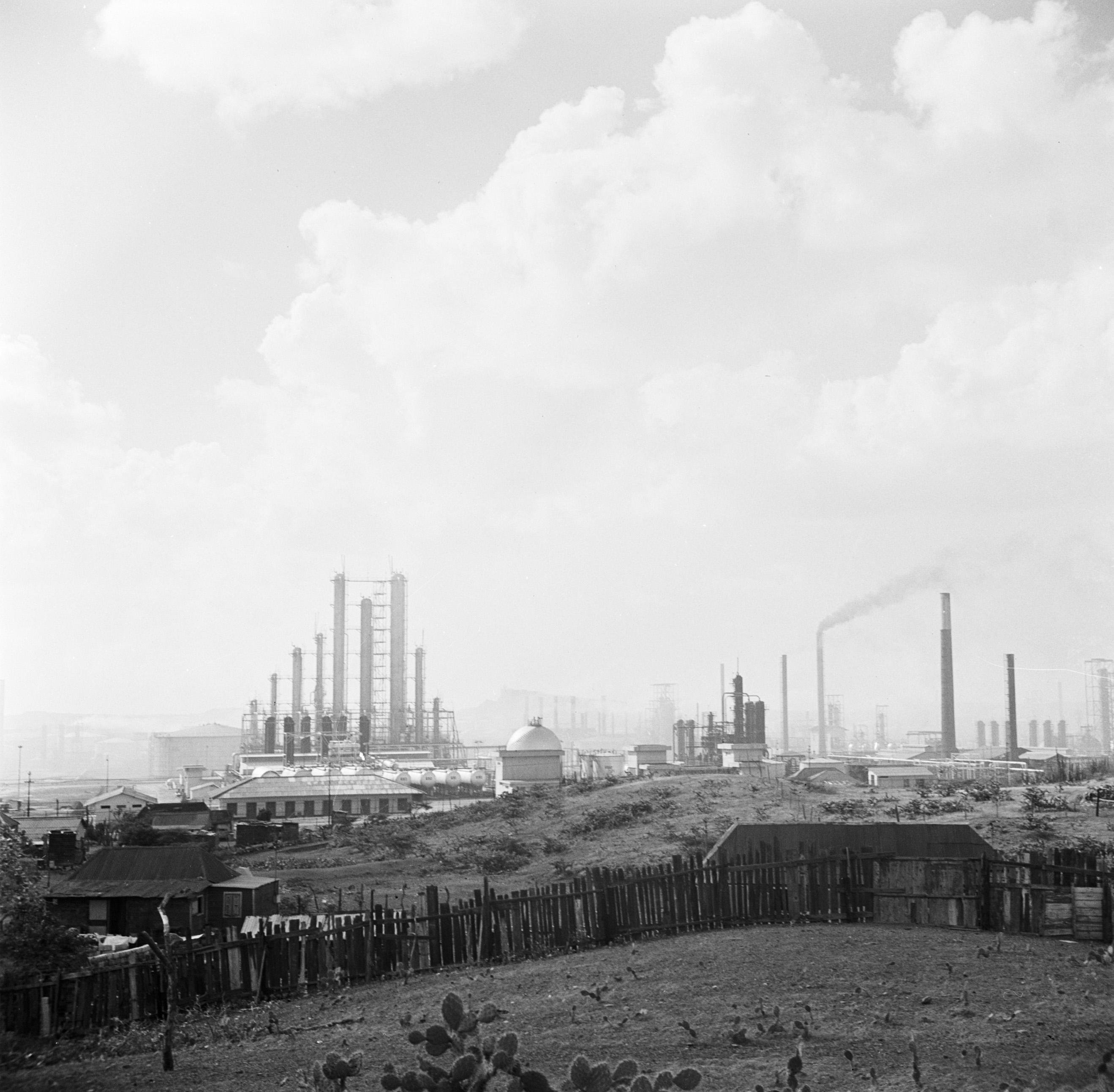
Fence of CPIM oil refinery in Curacao

During the 1920s–1950s the Isla Refinery became one of the largest in the world, creating a booming economy and middle class while also drawing in thousands of migrant workers from the Caribbean, South America, and Europe. In 1925, the Royal Dutch Shell company replaced the acronym CPM with CPIM. During World War II the refinery was a prime asset. The refineries in Curaçao and Aruba supplied around 70% of all fuel used by Allied forces. The vital role of the refineries triggered an attack from German U-boats in 1942. On April 29, 1959 the Shell company officially rebranded CPIM as Shell Curaçao N.V. Shrinking profit margins made Shell aggressively automate is systems during the 1950's and 60's, it slashed its workforce by around 75%. With the workforce cut, Shell transferred the remaining labour duties to low-wage, third party sub-contractors. The racial and wage discrimination caused a massive labour strike on May 30, 1969 led by prominent union figure Wilson Godett.

In 1985, due to low global refining margins and local friction, shell decided to pull out of Cuarçao, selling the refiner on September 23, 1985 Shell to the Curacao government for one Antillean guilder. On November 1, 1985 Shell completely moved out letting the Curaçao government fully take over. The Curaçao government immediately set up the state company Curacao Oil (Curoil) N.V. to manage distribution and leasing the refining operations out to Venezuela's PDVSA. The Curaçao government leased to Petróleos de Venezuela (PDVSA) and the refinery formally became known as Refineria Isla. The oil refinery left a lasting impact on the environment, such as the asphalt lake in Busca Bay. The asphalt lake is a 52-hectare basin containing 1.5 million tons of hazardous waste, accumulating since World War II. Due to Venezuela's economic collapse, and strict US sanctions the PDVSA ran out of crude oil feedstock as well as stock. The refinery permanently stopped all refinery operations when the PDVSA lease legally expired on December 31, 2019.

== Environmental impact and struggles ==
While managed by Shell, the refinery dumped around 1.5 million tons of unmanaged heavy asphalt waste into the Busca Bay, creating a 52-hectare lake of black asphalt. When Shell gave the company to the government of Cuarçao, the contract exempt Shell from paying for future environmental cleanup liability in 1985. When the government leased the refinery to PDVSA, they produced persistent soot and sulfur dioxide (SO_{2}). This caused many civilians in the nearby area to get asthma, permanent lung damage, the deaths of 18 people living downwind.

After the first wave of damage from 2007 to 2008 the Curaçao courts threatened to shut down the plant due to its high emissions, and even demanded the PDVSA to spend up to $2 billion dollars to upgrade the technology and a massive cleanup site, but the mandate was repeatedly ignored.

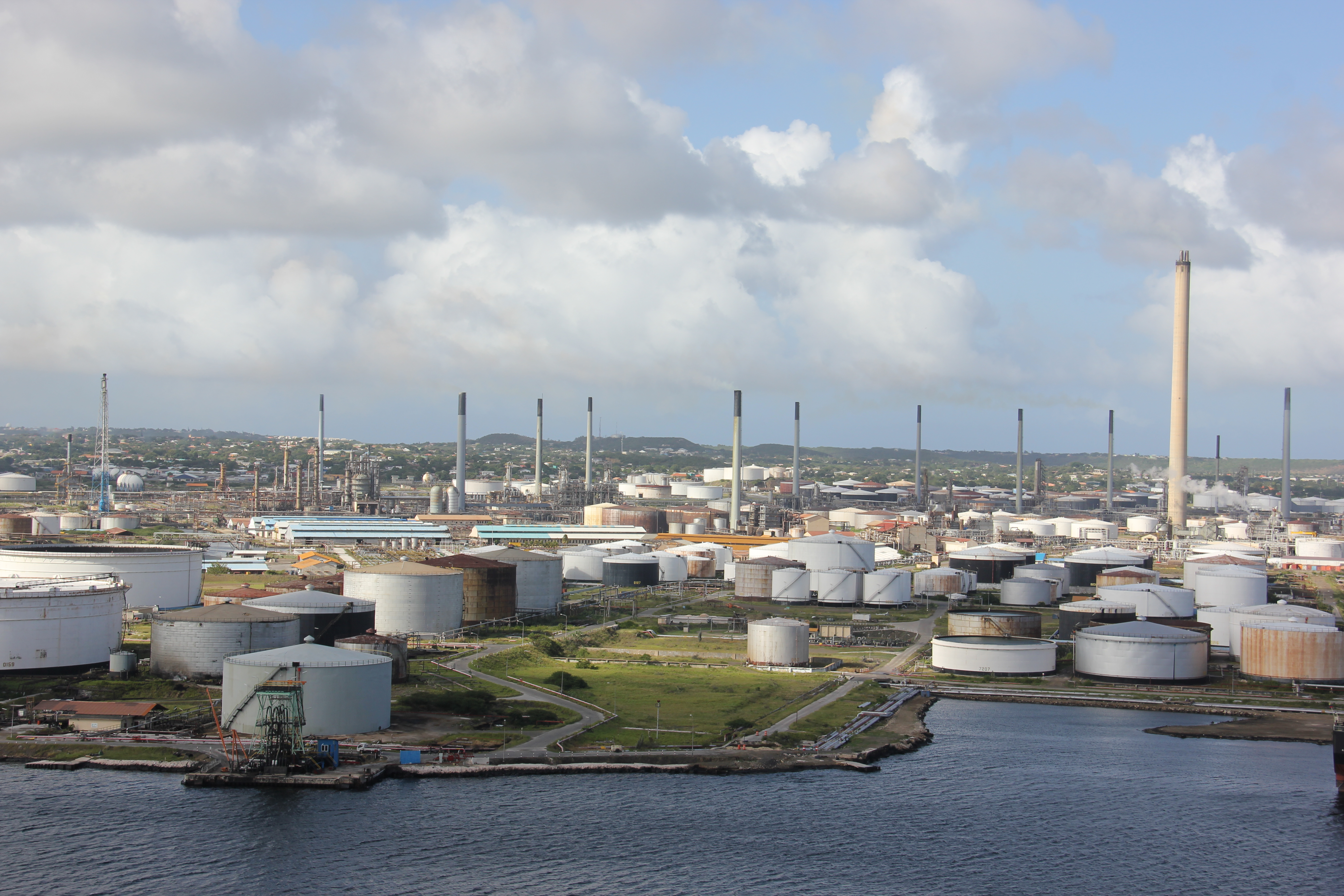
A Landscape shot of the Isla Refinery

In 2015, residents of the Wishi neighbourhood noticed a green substance accumulating on lampposts, cars, and fences that faced the refinery. In June 2015, the Netherlands Organization for Applied Scientific Research (TNO) released its findings to the public, they found that the green substance was carcinogenic and a mixture of heavy metals and consisted of a specific industrial chemical known as vanadium pentoxide (V_{2}O_{5}) as well as nickel (Ni). In August of 2015 a Curaçao court ruled in the residents favour and found that the operator of the refinery, PDVSA, was blatant to the environmental impact they were causing. The court threatened to fine the company around $50 million dollars if PDVSA didn't reduce their SO_{2} and particulate matter emissions. PDVSA ignored the courts orders and continued production, despite the warnings. Due to the economic collapse of Venezuela beginning in 2017 and American sanctions against the oil refinery, Venezuelan crude ships stopped turning up, maintenance ceased, and processing stopped entirely. Due to this, the green substance was reported less.

In May 2018 American energy company ConocoPhillips obtained a $2 Billion dollar international arbitration award against Venezuela for the illegal export of their assets. ConocoPhillips asking the Curaçao courts to seize of all of the assets of PDVSA and their oil inventories. The act completely stopped any commercial business at the refinery. The company was unable to start up business again, and it faced the end of its 34 year lease on December 31, 2019, completely closed the refineries doors, ending years of air pollution.

After the closing the refinery in 2019, the Curaçao state-owned refinery company Refineria di Kòrsou (RdK), negotiated a settlement with the PDVSA around late 2023, which was backed by sanction exceptions from the United States, for PDVSA to agree to a $450 million dollar oil-for-debt arrangement for the next 10 years. This agreement would help the refinery with its outstanding liabilities, former employee obligations, and operational debts.

Currently the government is looking for ways to modernise the facility and partially reopen the facility. Attempts and deals have been made like the Oryx Petroleum Deal and the 2Bays Energy Attempts. The Oryx Petroleum Deal, is a deal where Curaçao signs a Memorandum of Understanding with Oryx Petroleum to maybe restart the refinery, which is partially backed by Qatar's sovereign wealth fund. The 2Bays Energy Attempts were attempts by Curaçao to execute limited transactions to produce asphalt, heavy naphtha, and gasoil safely under modern, and more stricter rules, but Curaçao's been waiting on the Office of Foreign Assets Control (OFAC) permits from Washington.
