= Tseliiv =

Rural locality in Ternopil Oblast, Ukraine

Tseliiv Целіїв
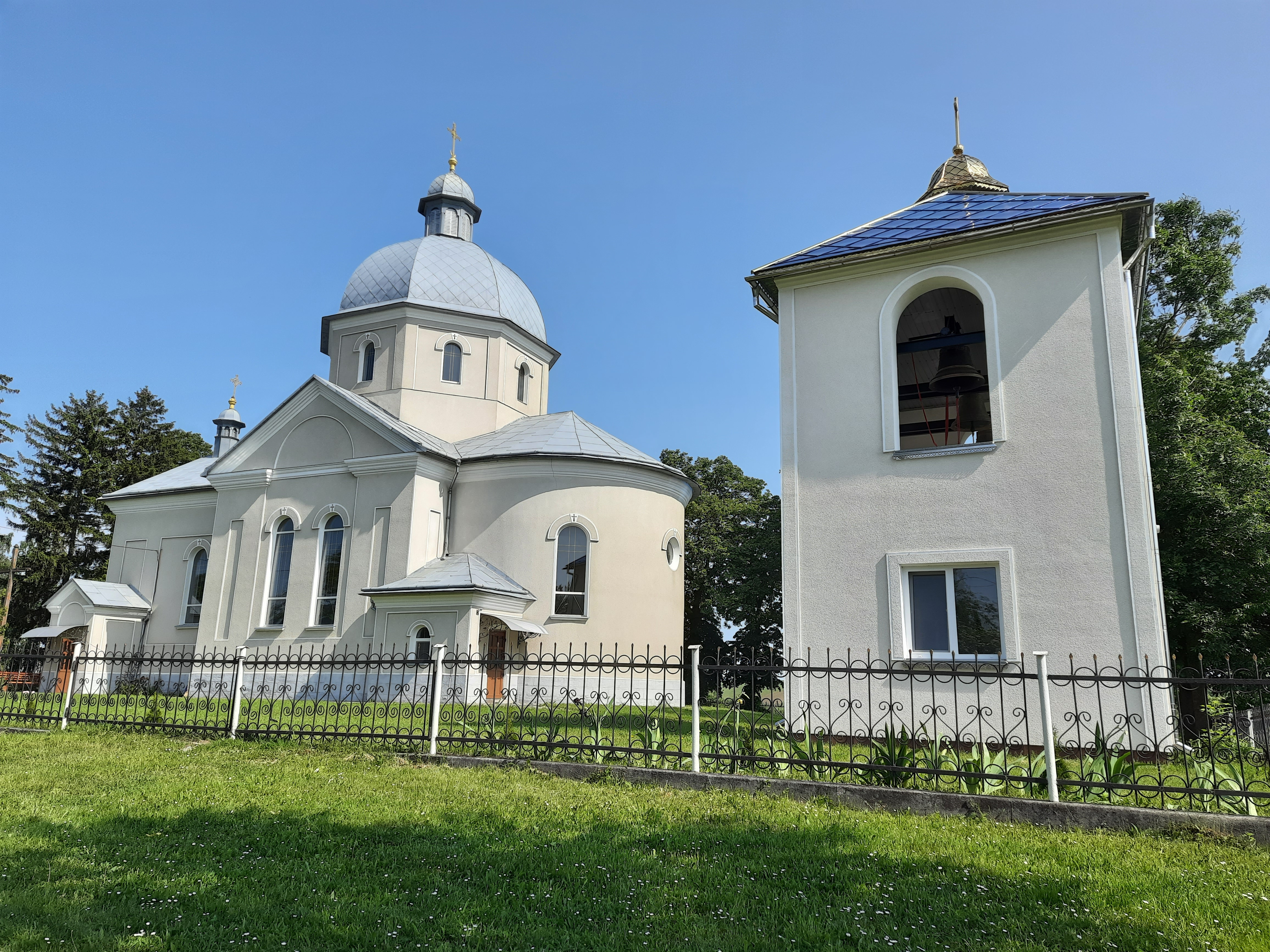
- Church of the Intercession

- Location in Ternopil Oblast
- Coordinates: 49°9′24″N 26°0′55″E
- Country: Ukraine
- Oblast: Ternopil Oblast
- Raion: Chortkiv Raion
- Hromada: Vasylkivtsi Hromada
- Time zone: UTC+2 (EET)
  - Summer (DST): UTC+3 (EEST)
- Postal code: 48250

Tseliiv (Ukrainian: Целіїв) is a village in Vasylkivtsi rural hromada, Chortkiv Raion, Ternopil Oblast, Ukraine.

== History ==
The first written mention is from 1391.

After the liquidation of the Husiatyn Raion on 19 July 2020, the village became part of the Ternopil Raion.

== Religion ==
- Church of the Intercession (1909, brich, UGCC)
