= Nelson Martínez (politician) =

Venezuelan politician

Nelson Martínez (15 July 1951 – 12 December 2018) was a Venezuelan politician who served as the Minister of Petroleum (2017) and President of PDVSA (2017). Martínez died due to health complications on 12 December 2018.
