= Nyzhbirok =

Rural locality in Ternopil Oblast, Ukraine

Nyzhbirok Нижбірок
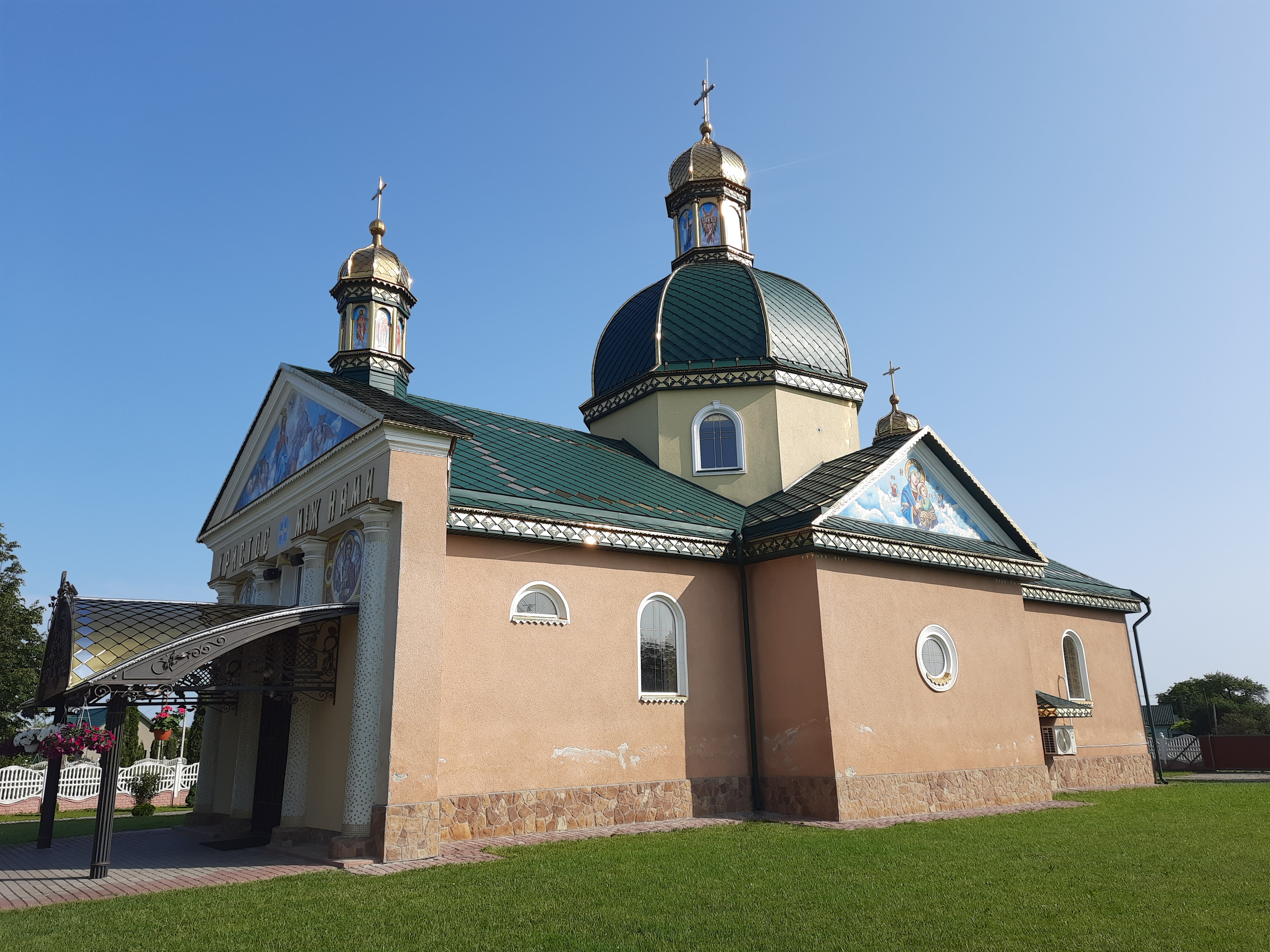
- Holy Trinity Church

- Location in Ternopil Oblast
- Coordinates: 49°7′30″N 26°1′19″E
- Country: Ukraine
- Oblast: Ternopil Oblast
- Raion: Chortkiv Raion
- Hromada: Vasylkivtsi Hromada
- Time zone: UTC+2 (EET)
  - Summer (DST): UTC+3 (EEST)
- Postal code: 48255

Nyzhbirok (Ukrainian: Нижбірок) is a village in Vasylkivtsi rural hromada, Chortkiv Raion, Ternopil Oblast, Ukraine.

== History ==
The first written mention is in 1564 as Novyi Nyzhbirok.

After the liquidation of the Husiatyn Raion on 19 July 2020, the village became part of the Ternopil Raion.

== Religion ==
- Greek Catholic Church of the Holy Trinity (circa 1700, brick, restored in 1897, rebuilt in 2007)
- Roman Catholic church (1886)

== People ==
- Mykola Sichynskyi (1850–1894), Ukrainian priest, ambassador to the Galician Provincial Sejm, publicist
