= Kotsiubyntsi =

Rural locality in Ternopil Oblast, Ukraine

Kotsiubyntsi Коцюбинці
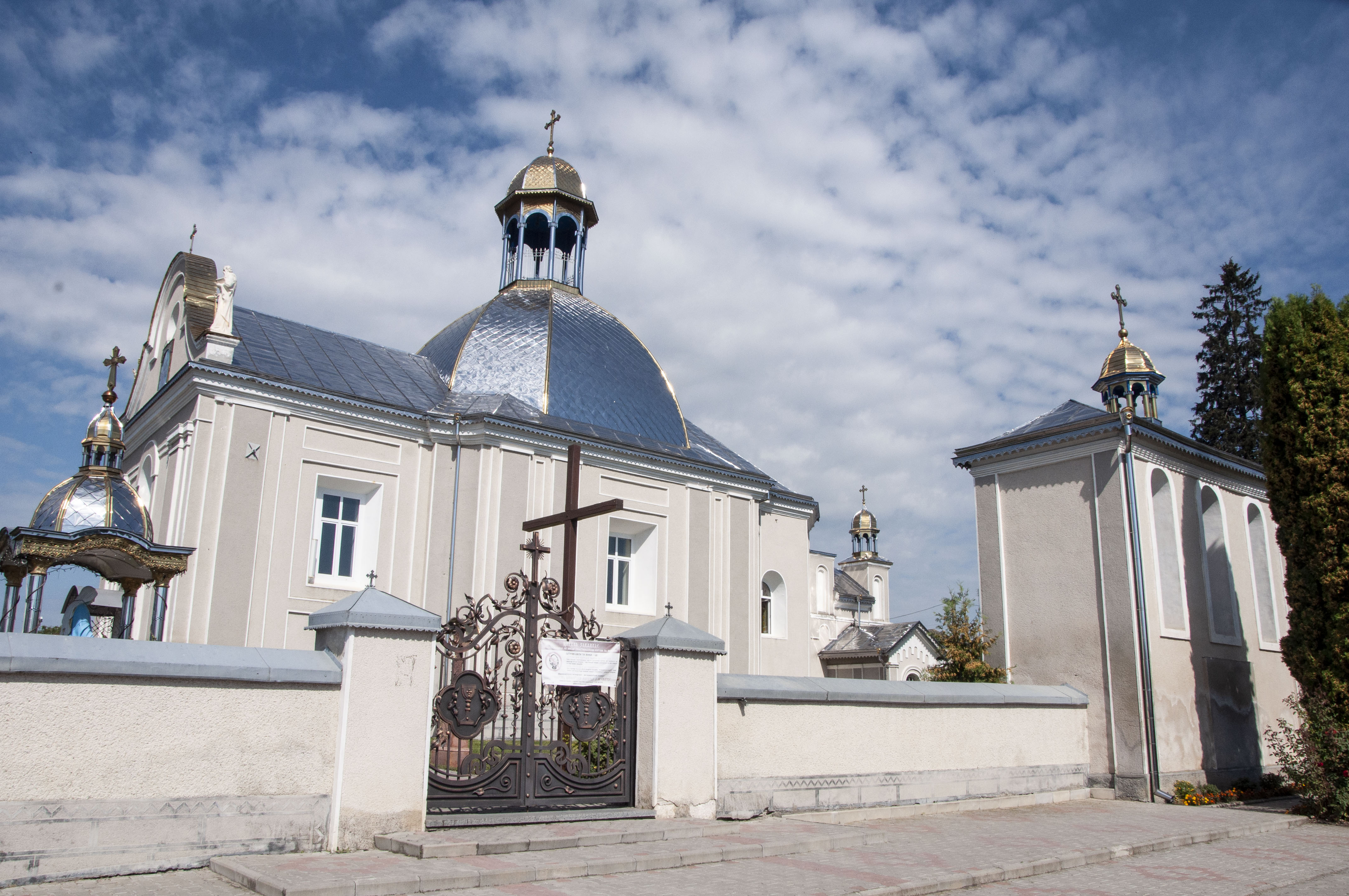
- Saint Michael church in Kotsiubyntsi

- Location in Ternopil Oblast Kotsiubyntsi (Ukraine)
- Coordinates: 49°04′20″N 25°58′50″E
- Country: Ukraine
- Oblast: Ternopil Oblast
- Raion: Chortkiv Raion
- Hromada: Vasylkivtsi Hromada
- Time zone: UTC+2 (EET)
  - Summer (DST): UTC+3 (EEST)
- Postal code: 48271

Kotsiubyntsi (Ukrainian: Коцюбинці) is a village in Vasylkivtsi rural hromada, Chortkiv Raion, Ternopil Oblast, Ukraine.

== History ==
The first written mention is in 1443 in the Terebovlia court records; at that time the village was called Kochubyn. In 1562, the village was already mentioned as Kotsiubyntsi.

There was a castle in the village.

After the liquidation of the Husiatyn Raion on 19 July 2020, the village became part of the Ternopil Raion.

== Religion ==
- Saint Michael church (1796, brick, restored in 1899)
- Roman Catholic Church of the Saints Peter and Paul (1902, built at the expense of the Horodyski family)

== People ==
- Myroslav Kapii (1888–1949), Ukrainian writer, translator, teacher
- Mykola Tarnovskyi (1892–1975), Ukrainian poet and public figure
- Mariia Tarnovska (1892–1975), Ukrainian writer in the United States
- Ivan Pavliukh (born 1976), Ukrainian football player and coach

== Sources ==
- (in Ukrainian) Мельничук, Б., Коцюбинці // Ternopil Encyclopedic Dictionary: in 4 v. / editorial board: H. Yavorskyi and other, Ternopil: "Zbruch", 2005, V. 2: К—О, S. 70. — ISBN 966-528-199-2.
- Гринюка Б. Коцюбинці та Чагарі: історико-краєзнавчий нарис, Тернопіль : Осадца Ю.В., 2019, 592 s., ISBN 978-617-7516-81-0.
- Джума Д., Карпишин, Б. Коцюбинці — село над Нічлавою: минуле та сучасне, Тернопіль : Терно-граф, 2018, 256 s, ISBN 966-457-327-3.
- Верига Ва. Листопадовий рейд 1921 року, Київ: Видавництво «Стікс», 2011.
- "Kociubińce". Geographical Dictionary of the Kingdom of Poland (in Polish). 4. Warszawa: Kasa im. Józefa Mianowskiego. 1883. p. 232.
