= Ivan Guta =

Ukrainian businessman

Ivan Mykolayovych Guta, sometimes transliterated as Huta, (Ukrainian: Іван Миколайович Гута) is a Ukrainian entrepreneur and co-founder of Mriya Agro Holding Public Limited, one of Ukraine’s largest grain producers. He defaulted on his debt in 2014 after the family had moved over $200 million into shell companies for their own benefit.

== Career ==
In the early 1990s, Guta and his wife Klavdiya received 50 hectares of arable land in the Ternopil region of western Ukraine from the Ukrainian government. In 1992, they founded Mriya Agro Holding.

In 2010 or in 2008, their son Mykola took over the business. He made an initial public offering of shares on the Frankfurt Stock Exchange. By 2010, the company exported its products to more than 20 countries, and total capitalization reached $1.1 billion. From 2010–2013, the company received $175 million loans from the World Bank Group’s International Finance Corporation and $24 million from the European Bank for Reconstruction and Development to finance its working capital. By 2012, Mriya Agro Holding had expanded to almost 300,000 hectares of land.

By 2014, Mriya Agro Holding had supposedly expanded to 320,000 hectares in six regions of Western Ukraine. In August 2014, Mriya reported being unable to pay about $9 million of interest and $120 million of debts. The total amount of debt to the companies affiliated with the Huta family amounted to $1.3 billion. Deutsche Bank was owed €40 million and Credit Suisse itself was owed almost €13 million.

== Personal life ==
Guta and his wife Klavdiya have two sons, Andriy and Mykola Guta. Mykola was extradited to Ukraine in 2018, but returned to Switzerland. As of 2022, all live in Switzerland.

== Controversy ==
According to the 2022 Suisse secrets data leak, the family moved over $200 million of the company’s money into Cypriot shell companies. In 2019 Cyprus had European arrest warrants issued against the Gutas, and in 2020 an international Red Notice.
