= PDVSA =

Venezuelan state-owned oil and gas company

Petróleos de Venezuela, S.A.

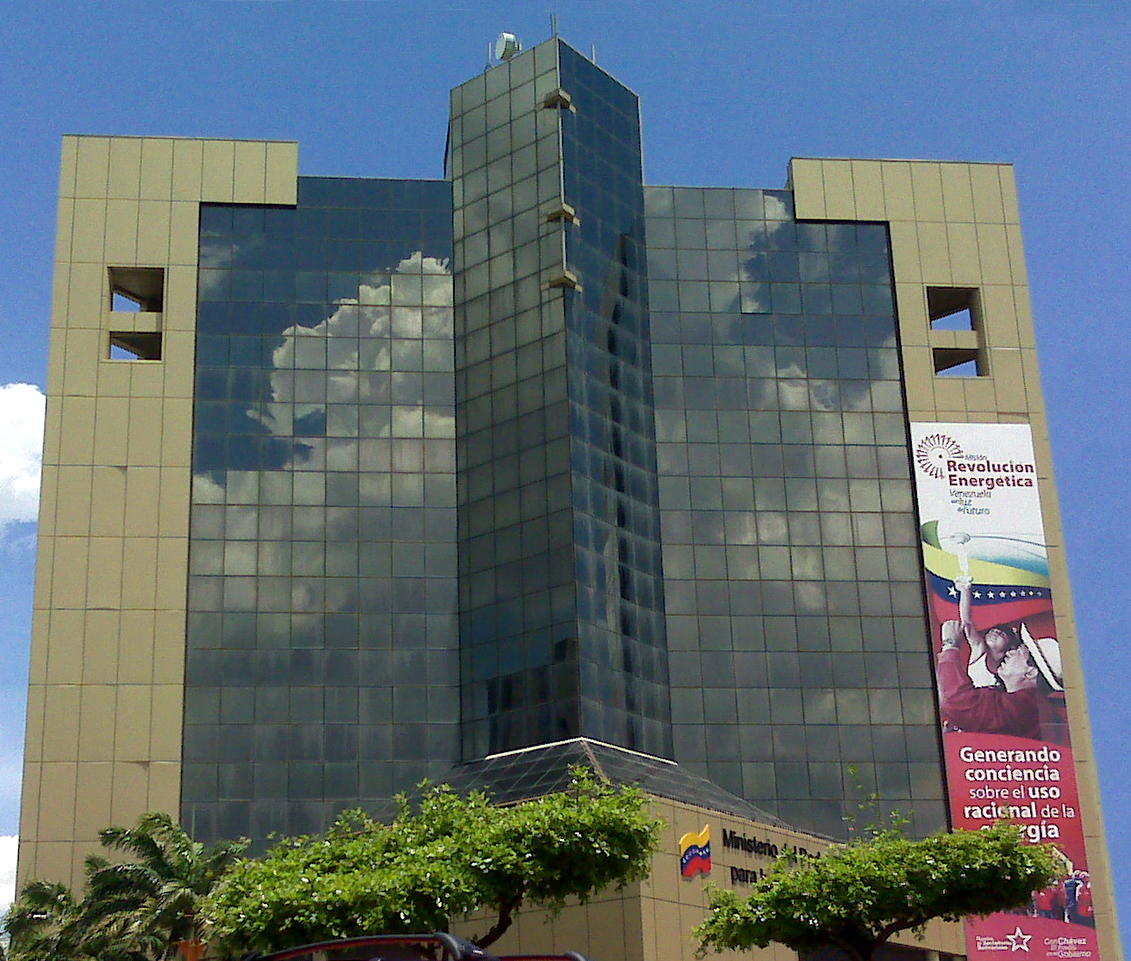
- Headquarters in 5 de Julio, Maracaibo
- Trade name: PDVSA
- Type: State-owned S.A.
- Industry: Oil and gas
- Founded: January 1976; 50 years ago
- Headquarters: 5 de Julio, Maracaibo, Zulia, Venezuela
- Products: Fuel, natural gas and other petrochemicals
- Revenue: ▼US$48.0 billion (2016)
- Net income: ▼$828 million (2016)
- Total assets: ▼$189.7 billion (2016)
- Owner: Government of Venezuela
- Number of employees: 70,000
- Subsidiaries: PDV Marina; CVP; Pequiven; CIED; PDVSA Gas; PDV Deltaven; Palmaven; Electricidad de Caracas, C.A. (93.62%); Citgo (100%)
- Website: www.pdvsa.com

Petróleos de Venezuela, S.A. (PDVSA, Spanish pronunciation: [peðeˈβesa]; English: Petroleum of Venezuela) is the state-owned oil and gas company of Venezuela. It has activities in exploration, production, refining and exporting of oil, as well as exploration and production of natural gas. Since its founding on January 1, 1976, with the nationalization of the Venezuelan oil industry, PDVSA has dominated the petroleum industry of Venezuela, one of the world's largest oil exporters.

Oil reserves in Venezuela are the largest in the world, and the state-owned PDVSA provides the government of Venezuela with substantial funding resources. Following the Bolivarian Revolution, PDVSA was mainly used as a vital source of income for the Venezuelan government. Profits were also used to assist the presidency, with funds directed towards allies of the Venezuelan government. With PDVSA focusing on political projects instead of oil production, mechanical and technical statuses deteriorated while employee expertise was removed following thousands of politically motivated firings. Incompetence within the company led to serious inefficiencies and accidents, as well as endemic corruption; at least US$11 billion was stolen between 2004 and 2015. Jorge Giordani, the minister of planning until 2014, estimated that $300 billion was simply stolen. Due to infrastructure and management struggles, PDVSA has seen production decline from 3.5 million barrels per day in the 1990s to approximately 800,000 barrels per day in the 2020s. In 2018, thousands of workers left PDVSA, especially after the company was put under military control.

== Reserves and capacity ==
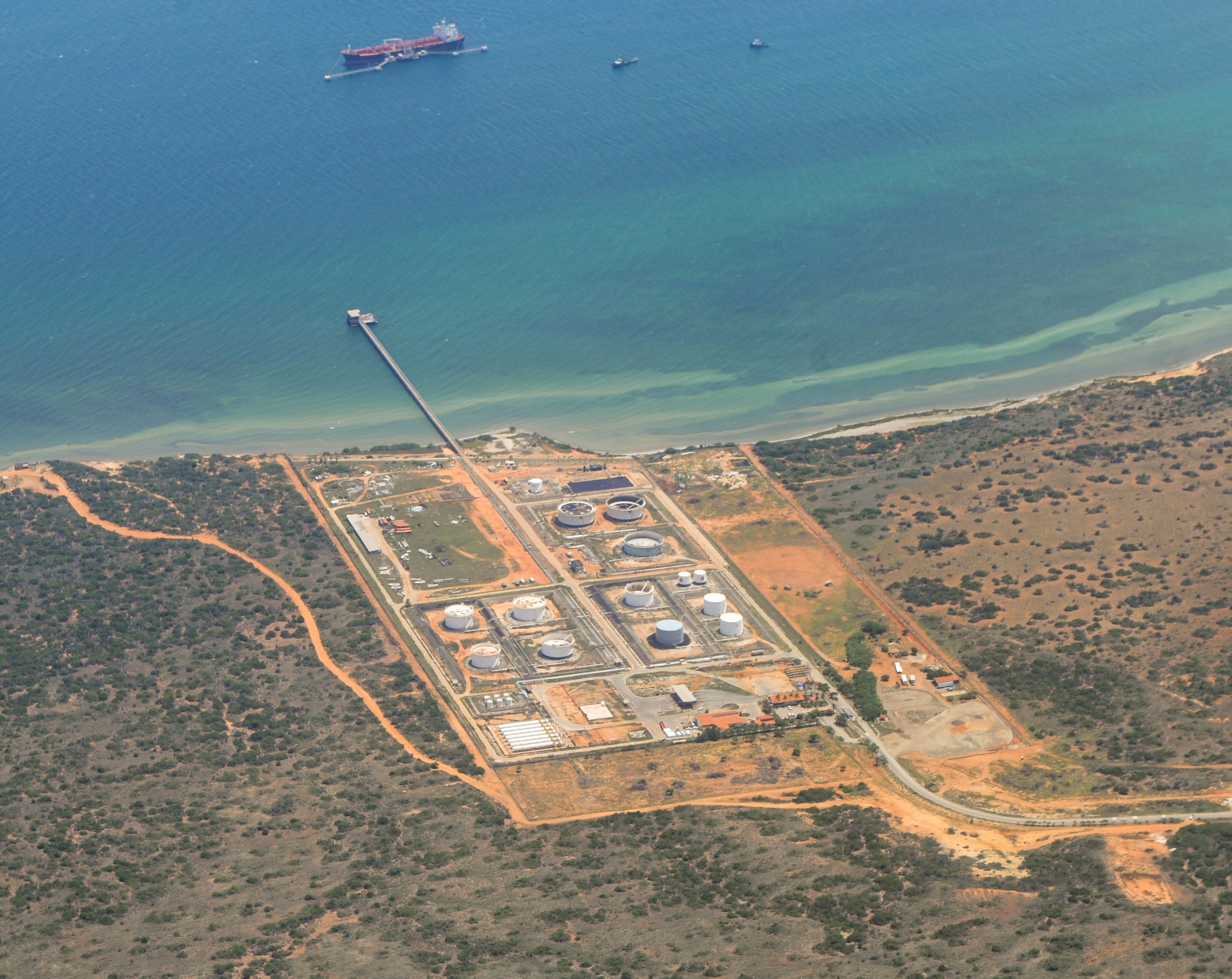
PDVSA Gas, Isla de Margarita

As of 2003, Venezuela had 77.5 billion barrels (1.232×10^{10} m^{3}) of conventional oil reserves according to PDVSA figures, the largest in the Western Hemisphere and making up approximately half the total. This puts Venezuela as fifth in the world in proven reserves of conventional oil. By also including an estimated 235 billion barrels (3.74×10^{10} m^{3}) of tar-like extra heavy crude oil in the Orinoco Belt region, Venezuela claims to hold the largest hydrocarbon reserves in the world. Venezuela also has 150 trillion cubic feet (4.2×10^{12} m^{3}) of natural gas reserves. The crude oil PDVSA extracts from the Orinoco is refined into a fuel eponymously named 'Orimulsion'.

PDVSA has a production capacity, including the strategic associations and operating agreements, of 4 million barrels (640,000 m^{3}) per day (600,000 m^{3}). Officials say production is around 3.3 million barrels per day (520,000 m^{3}/d) although most secondary sources such as OPEC and the EIA put Venezuela's output at least 500,000 barrels per day (79,000 m^{3}/d) lower.

During the presidency of Hugo Chávez the organization's payroll tripled, while oil production fell steeply, a drop of 700,000 barrels per day. Soaring oil prices began in 2002 and peaked in 2008 at $147 per barrel.

== Politicization ==
In 2002, many PDVSA employees went on strike against the policies of Chávez, who in response fired over 19,000 workers from the company. As of 2014, Intevep, the research and development arm of PDVSA, reportedly lost 80% of its workers, severely damaging PDVSA's ability to innovate and compete in the global petroleum market. PDVSA saw stagnant growth in the following era which was defined by a boom in oil prices. Between 2002 and 2012, incapacitating injuries to employees rose from 1.8 per million man hours to 6.2, extremely high compared to 0.6 per million man hours for Pemex in 2012, highlighting the company's struggle to optimize. Several former PDVSA employees moved to Alberta, where the oil consistency was similar to that of the Orinoco. As a result, the number of Venezuelans in Alberta has risen from 465 in 2001 to 3,860 in 2011. Other PDVSA workers migrated to Colombia, joined Ecopetrol, and were credited with helping the company attain huge profits throughout the 2010s.

In 2006, Rafael Ramírez, the energy minister, gave PDVSA workers a choice: Support President Hugo Chávez, or lose their jobs. The minister also said: "PDVSA is red [the color identified with Chávez's political party], red from top to bottom". Chávez defended Ramírez, saying that public workers should back the "revolution". He added that "PDVSA's workers are with this revolution, and those who aren't should go somewhere else. Go to Miami". In 2012, PDVSA focused in hiring only supporters of the president and PDVSA revenue was used to fund Venezuela's socialist revolution.

== History ==
=== 1970s: Nationalization ===
Under the presidency of Carlos Andrés Pérez, whose economic plan, "La Gran Venezuela", called for the nationalization of the oil industry, Venezuela officially nationalized its oil industry on 1 January 1976 at the site of Zumaque oilwell 1 (Mene Grande). This was the birth of Petróleos de Venezuela S.A. (PDVSA). All foreign oil companies that once did business in Venezuela were replaced by Venezuelan companies, such as Lagoven (Standard Oil), Maraven (Shell), and Llanoven (Mobil). Each of the former concessionaires was simply substituted by a new 'national' oil company, which maintained the structures and functions of its multi-national corporation (MNC) predecessor. With the 1976 nationalization, each previous multinational operator was converted into an affiliate of PDVSA; these affiliates were grouped into an administrative structure underneath both PDVSA and the Venezuelan Ministry of Energy. With this absorption, PDVSA became the employer of engineers with comprehensive technical training from the old multinational corporations and promptly took advantage of their newfound expertise. Within 25 years of nationalization, PDVSA would become the largest company in Latin America and the tenth most profitable in the world. In that 25-year span they went from 18 billion barrels to over 80 billion barrels worth of oil reserves, with a similar increase in production capacity.

Venezuelan oil industry in 1976
| Petroven operating company | Former principal concessionaire | | Wells drilled | 1,000 barrels per day | | |
| Petroven operating company | Company | Owned by / Affiliation | Wells drilled | Crude oil | Refined | Refinery capacity |
|---|---|---|---|---|---|---|
| Amoven | Amoco Venezuela Oil Co | (United States) Standard Oil of Indiana | 13 | 24 | | |
| Bariven | Sinclair Venezuelan Oil Co | (United States) Atlantic Richfield Co | | 19 | 30 | 45 |
| Boscaven | Chevron Oil de Venezuela S.A | (United States) Standard Oil of California | | 22 | 32 | 61 |
| CVP | CVP | Government of Venezuela | 36 | 60 | 15 | 25 |
| Deltaven | Texaco Maracaibo Inc | (United States) Texaco | 7 | 60 | 2 | 10 |
| Guariven | Soc. Anonima Petrolera Las Mercedes | (Venezuela) Venezuelan investors | 7 | 2 | | |
| Lagoven | Creole Petroleum Corp | (United States) Exxon Corp | 132 | 1,004 | 425 | 740 |
| Llanoven | Mobil Oil Co de Venezuela | (United States) Mobil Oil Corp | 7 | 67 | 88 | 106 |
| Maraven | Cia. Shell de Venezuela Ltd | (United Kingdom) (Netherlands) Royal Dutch/Shell Group | 10 | 531 | 259 | 404 |
| Meneven | Mene Grande Oil Co. C.A | (United States) Gulf Oil Corp | 109 | 364 | 127 | 159 |
| Palmaven | Venezuela Sun Oil Co | (United States) Sun Oil Co | 8 | 104 | | |
| Roqueven | Phillips Petroleum Co | (United States) Phillips Petroleum Co | 6 | 36 | 5 | 4 |
| Taloven | Talon Petroleum Co. C.A | (Venezuela) Venezuelan investors | 3 | 3 | | |
| Vistaven | Mito Juan Concessionaria de Hidrocarburos C.A | (Venezuela) Venezuelan investors | | 2 | | |
| Total | | | 333 | 2,294 | 984 | 1,554 |

=== 1980s–1990s: Apertura ===
In the 1990s, Venezuela opened the company to global cooperation. The opening up of the Venezuelan oil industry, or Apertura, was initialized with a Venezuelan Supreme Court decision which removed older laws prohibiting cooperation with multi-national corporations on Venezuelan land. From 1993 through 1998, PDVSA split extraction rights with multiple multi-national companies in special arrangements called "strategic associations", in effect trading Venezuelan crude oil for the efficiency that came from outside expertise and technology. These "strategic associations" were controversial: Venezuela was able to maximize profits at the cost of lenient taxation on the multinational companies and the loss of control over domestic resources. With Chávez's election in 1998, Venezuela's attention became increasingly focused on complying with OPEC. As oil prices collapsed in the late 1990s, however, keeping the special arrangements while conforming to OPEC regulations became impossible, leading to an end of the Apertura arrangements for Venezuela.

Before the election of Hugo Chávez, PDVSA ran autonomously, making oil decisions based on internal guidance to increase profits. Chávez, once he came to power, started directing PDVSA and effectively turned it into a direct government arm whose profits would be injected into social spending. The result of this was the creation of "Bolivarian Missions", oil funded social programs targeting poverty, illiteracy, hunger, and more. With the Apertura, PDVSA many of its managers become active in Venezuelan politics and served as national representatives in economic summits. Chávez continued this trend, further incorporating PDVSA into the government's structure, but made social welfare the priority. During his campaign, Chávez repeatedly said that PDVSA was previously too autonomous and powerful, and that its managers acted subversively to Venezuela. Chávez turned the post-Apertura PDVSA into a political rallying point for his mostly lower-class supporters by associating its Apertura liberalization policies with the country's ruling groups, energizing his working class supporters against the companies former special arrangements. In 1998, PDVSA produced 3.4 million barrels of oil a day and had 40,000 employees. By law, it deposited its revenues in the sovereign fund accounts in the Central Bank of Venezuela.

=== 2000–2010: Social spending ===
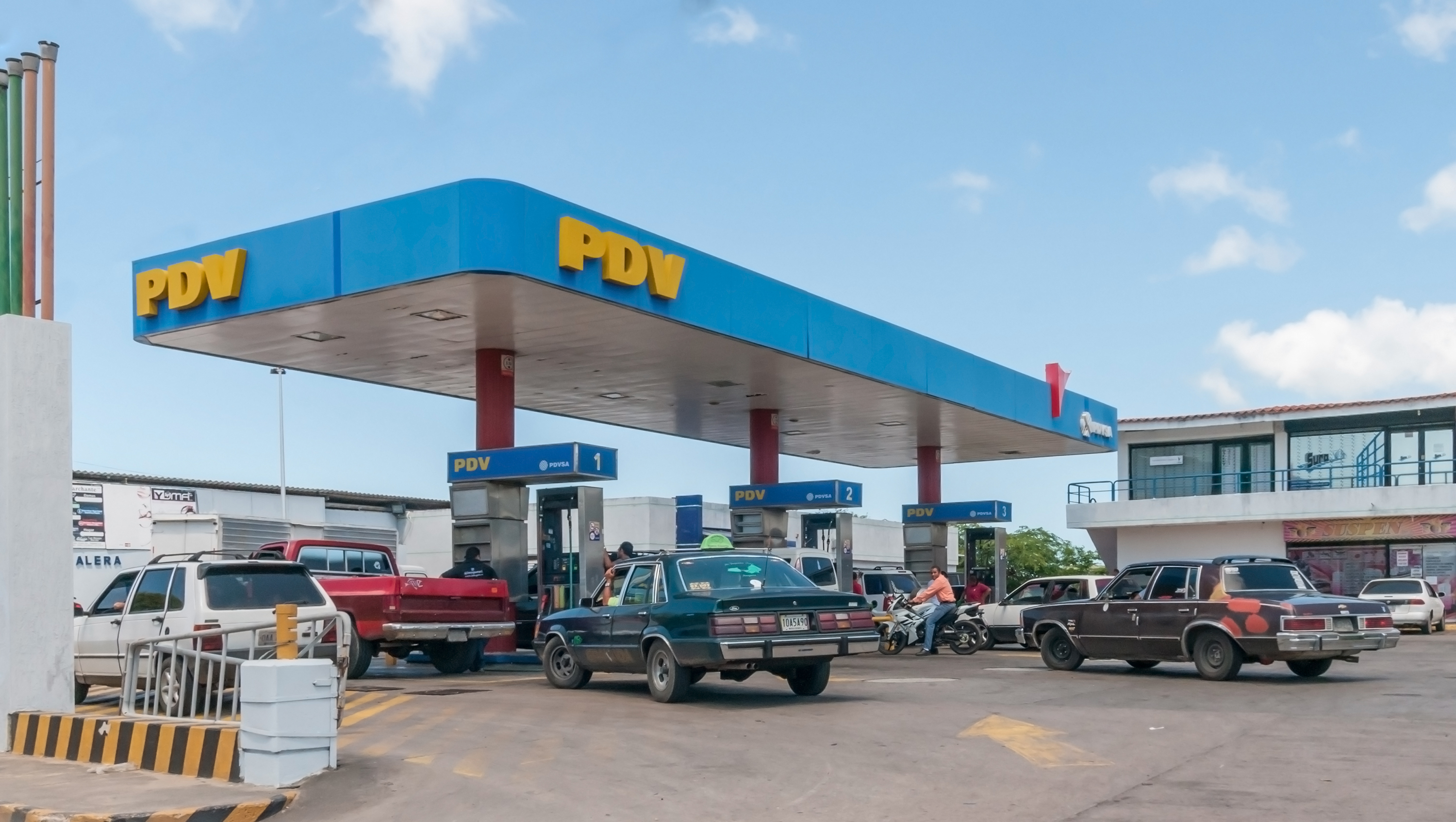
Filling station in Venezuela of PDV (a subsidiary of PDVSA)

In December 2002, the Venezuelan general strike of 2002-2003 saw many of PDVSA's managers and employees, including the CTV trade union federation, join to pressure Venezuelan president Hugo Chávez to call early elections, and virtually stop oil production for two months. Nearly 19,000 employees, most of them seasoned professionals, were summarily dismissed, and production resumed with employees loyal to the government. The International Labour Organization (ILO) called on the Venezuelan government to launch "an independent investigation into allegations of detention and torture," surrounding this strike. The company has since formed its own militia, which all employees join on a voluntary basis, to ward off a potential "coup" by the government. It considers itself virtually indistinguishable from the state, its social programs more or less running the country's "socialist revolution".

In 2005, PDVSA opened its first office in China, and announced plans to nearly triple its fleet of oil tankers, to 58. In April and May 2005, PDVSA, per an agreement signed between the governments of Venezuela and Argentina, sent 50 million tonnes of fuel oil to the latter to alleviate the effects of an energy crisis due to a shortage of natural gas.

In November 2005, PDVSA and its subsidiary in the United States, Citgo, announced an agreement with Massachusetts to provide heating oil to low income families in Boston at a discount of 40% below market price. Similar agreements were later set up with other states and cities in the US Northeast, including New York's Bronx, Maine, Rhode Island, Pennsylvania, Vermont and Delaware. Under the program, Citgo offered a total of around 50 million US gallons (190,000 m^{3}) of heating oil at below market prices, equivalent to a discount of between 60 and 80 cents a gallon.

On July 28, 2006, credit ratings agency Moody's Investor Service said it was removing its standalone ratings on PDVSA because the oil company did not provide adequate operational and financial information. As of 2019, PDVSA had still not filed its 2004 financial results with the US Securities and Exchange Commission that were due in June 2005.

During the 2000s, PDVSA carried out showcase projects in shanty towns and waste removal.

In 2008, PDVSA had been Latin America's largest company, but in 2009 it was overtaken by Petrobras and Pemex, according to a ranking of the region's top 500 companies from Latin Business Chronicle.

==== 2007 expropriations ====
In 2007, PDVSA bought 82% percent of Electricidad de Caracas company from AES Corporation as part of a renationalization program. Subsequently, the ownership share rose to 93.62% by December 2008. Assets of ExxonMobil and ConocoPhillips were expropriated in 2007 after they declined to restructure their holdings in Venezuela to give PDVSA majority control; Total, Chevron, Statoil and BP agreed and retained minority shares in their Venezuelan projects. Reaching a settlement with ExxonMobil proved difficult; Venezuela offered book value for ExxonMobil's assets, while ExxonMobil asked for as much as $12 billion. As of January 2012, this and the claims of ConocoPhillips remained before the World Bank's International Centre for Settlement of Investment Disputes.

In February 2012, PDVSA paid $255 million to ExxonMobil in compensation for nationalization of ExxonMobil's Venezuelan assets in 2007 and $420 million to be paid beginning in 2012 to US firms Williams Cos Inc. and Exterran Holdings, Inc for natural gas assets nationalized in 2009.

During the same time, oil executives and politicians siphoned off at least $11 billion. More than 24 Venezuelans linked to four corruption schemes amassed at least $273 million in 25 Credit Suisse accounts opened between 2004 and 2015.

=== 2010s: crisis in Venezuela, corruption ===
In 2010, PDVSA loaned the government of Antigua $68 million to repurchase all remaining shares of West Indies Oil Company (WIOC) from Bruce Rappaport's National Petroleum Ltd.

In 2012, PDVSA announced that it would enter into a joint venture agreement with Eni SpA and Repsol in order to initiate a gas production project at the Cardon VI gas block in Venezuela. Production from this joint venture is estimated to reach between 80 and 100 million cubic meters of gas. In February 2014, PDVSA and the Anglo-French oil firm Perenco entered into talks for a $600 million financing deal to boost production at their Petrowarao joint venture. In October 2014, Venezuela imported its first ever ship of oil from Algeria so that they could dilute their oil.

Policies enacted by Chávez caused a crisis in Venezuela, with the nation's economy deteriorating greatly. Because of the hyperinflation and food shortage, paychecks have become all but valueless, leading to mass resignation from workers. By 2017, PDVSA could not even afford to export oil through international waters, which requires safety inspections and cleaning under maritime law, with a fleet of tankers stranded in the Caribbean Sea due to the issue. In addition, Nicolás Maduro fired the head of PDVSA and replaced him with Major General Manuel Quevedo, placating the military by giving them control of PDVSA. The developments resulted in a fragmented corporate structure and not enough workers to keep certain rigs operating continuously. By the end of 2013, Venezuela produced 1.2 million barrels of oil per day from the Orinoco, falling short of its target of 1.5 million barrels. The repeated poor performances of PDVSA were heavily linked to Venezuela's current hyperinflation crisis. In order to correct for these shortcomings, Maduro installed more Venezuelan military members in several key PDVSA positions, in an effort to reduce the corruption and inefficiency.

Between 1999 and 2017, PDVSA earned an estimated $635 billion in revenue and produced an additional $406 billion worth of oil. Production dropped further, to half of its 1998 benchmark. Accountability for the funds was no longer required and Jorge Giordani, minister of planning until in 2014, estimates that $300 billion was simply stolen. Despite having some of the largest proven oil reserves in the world, in June 2018 PDVSA's actions grew more desperate as they began to import and refine foreign crude oil for the first time in the country's history so they could meet export demands. Oil production had also slowed to levels not seen since the 1950s due to economic and management difficulties.

During the government of José Luis Rodríguez Zapatero, Raúl Morodo served as the Spanish Ambassador to Venezuela. In a legal case that garnered significant media attention, Morodo and his son, Alejo Morodo, admitted to receiving payments from the Venezuelan state oil company, Petróleos de Venezuela, S.A. (PDVSA), through "simulated operations." These payments were allegedly exchanged for fictitious consultancy and advisory services, amounting to at least €4.5 million. The Morodos utilized a network of companies—Aequitas Abogadosy Consultores Asociados, S.L., Furnival Barristers Corp, S.A., and Morodo Abogados y Asociados, S.L.—to facilitate these transactions, which were designed to defraud the Spanish tax authorities by creating the appearance of legitimate business operations. The companies in question lacked substantial physical presence, infrastructure, and genuine business activities, serving primarily to issue invoices and transfer funds directly to Raúl Morodo’s personal account at Banco de Sabadell. In 2014, Raúl Morodo acknowledged committing at least one fiscal offense, resulting in a conviction to a ten-month prison sentence and fines totaling €1.4 million, to be paid jointly with his son. Alejo Morodo received a separate sentence of twenty-four months of imprisonment and is responsible for the majority of the fines due to his role in managing the instrumental companies. The case, initially involving allegations of money laundering and political corruption linked to Morodo's diplomatic relations with high-ranking Venezuelan officials such as Delcy Rodríguez, was later downgraded by the Audiencia Nacional to focus solely on tax evasion. Negotiations between the Morodos and the Fiscalía Anticorrupción (Anti-Corruption Prosecutor's Office) have led to a settlement agreement, wherein the Morodos have agreed to repay the defrauded amounts and acknowledge their crimes in exchange for reduced sentencing recommendations. The Sindicato Manos Limpias has also participated in the proceedings, advocating for harsher penalties, including eight and a half years for Alejo Morodo and three and a half years for Raúl Morodo. The settlement was publicly disclosed by the newspaper EL MUNDO, highlighting the extensive measures taken to address the fiscal and ethical violations committed by the Morodo family.

Since 2015, a US Justice Department investigation into PDVSA corruption resulted in 12 guilty pleas pertaining to a bribery scheme between PDVSA and its contractors. The scheme involved members within the company who would insure favorable treatment of vendors in exchange for kickbacks. For example, in 2015, Roberto Enrique Rincon was arrested and in 2016 pleaded guilty to bribery and tax evasion in a scheme to secure energy contracts. In 2016, he was described as having built "36 maletín-based companies with intractable nested ownership structures". These actions violated the US's Foreign Corrupt Practices Act and were classified as conspiracy to commit money laundering. The 2022 Suisse secrets data leak found seven people had Credit Suisse accounts, which at their maximum held a total of at least 20.1 million Swiss francs.

In May 2017, Goldman Sachs purchased $2.8 billion of PDVSA 2022 bonds from the Central Bank of Venezuela.

In August 2017, President Donald Trump's administration imposed economic sanctions against PDVSA that restricted the industry's access to credit markets.

With the prospects of Maduro leaving power in early 2019 confidence saw an assessable increase in the nation, with tangible financial benefits like an increase in value of bonds for PDVSA, the country's major oil and gas company, which went up 5% in January 2019. According to Laura Gamboa Gutiérrez, Maduro was able to retain the military's support after they were given control of PDVSA allowing military leaders to personally profit from black market deals.

=== 2020s ===
In 2020, Maduro created a committee to restructure PDVSA. In September 2021, a U.S. trial began about PDVSA owing $150 million to Siemens Energy, which PDVSA said it could not pay because of U.S. sanctions. By 2023, PDVSA had not paid bills for $21.2 billion; Maduro suspended the committee and replaced oil minister Tareck El Aissami with Pedro Rafael Tellechea. According to Attorney General Tarek Saab, 51 people were detained.

In December 2025, PDVSA reported a cyberattack, attributing it to the "U.S. and domestic conspirators."

== Ownership of Citgo ==
In 1986, PDVSA bought 50% of the United States gasoline brand Citgo from Southland Corporation and in 1990 the remaining half. With full ownership of Citgo, PDVSA at its peak controlled 10% of the US domestic oil market, creating a lucrative export chain from Venezuelan soil to American consumers, as the two largest buyers of Venezuelan petroleum are the United States and China, respectively.

In 2013, despite dwindling performance, PDVSA was able to add Russia's Rosneft as an extraction partner, anticipating to extract 2.1 million barrels of petroleum per day. With the onset of the Crisis in Venezuela, the country borrowed 1.5 billion dollars from Russia, offering 49.9% of PDVSA's share in Citgo as collateral.

In October 2018, PDVSA paid $949 million on its Citgo backed bond to investors, a payment many analysts thought was impossible for the company given its recent liquidity struggles. The payment meant that PDVSA would continue to own Citgo, but failure to pay would result in Citgo transferring ownership to one of PDVSA's creditors. Losing Citgo would be disastrous for PDVSA, as they would lose the key terminal of their export chain to the US and the chemical additives necessary for oil refinery that Citgo produces. The loss would wreak additional havoc on Venezuela's economy, drying up the revenue stream that provides 90% of the government's hard-currency earnings. In April 2019 the next payment was due and at the time, PDVSA was completely insolvent, with the rest of their $60 billion debt. Canadian mining firm Crystallex was another creditor of PDVSA's Citgo holdings and could potentially end up in control should PDVSA default in 2020. Crystallex, through a US court case, had already received an undisclosed amount of Citgo shares in compensation for Venezuela's 2008 nationalization of their mines. A separate Canadian mining firm, Rusoro, was also pursuing $1.28 billion in repayment for the prior nationalization of its assets, through the US justice system until PDVSA begins making payments.

In October 2019, Juan Guaidó filed a lawsuit in the US to invalidate the PDVSA 2020 bonds. In January 2022, the US Treasury extended a rule to shield Citgo from being seized by creditors, and in April 2023 it extended it for another 3 months.

== Safety ==
There have been worsening safety problems since 2003, culminating in a gas leak at the Paraguaná Refinery Complex in August 2012 which caused an explosion, killing 48 people and damaging 1600 homes. A lightning strike caused a fire at the El Palito refinery in September 2012.

== Organization ==
=== Board of directors ===
The Board of Directors of PDVSA "is the administrative body of the Corporation, with the broadest powers of management and disposal, without other limitations than those established by law and the social bylaws of PDVSA". It is responsible for preparing and presenting operational and financial reports, as well as formulating and implementing the company's operational, economic, financial, and social strategies.

The current board of directors was appointed by Presidential Decree No. 4.846 published in Extraordinary Official Gazette No. 6760 of August 28, 2023 and is composed of:

- Pedro Rafael Tellechea Ruiz - President of PDVSA
- Héctor Andrés Obregón Pérez - Executive Vice President
- Leyli Beatriz Ferrer Avendaño - Vice President of Planning and Engineering
- Luis Enrique Molina Duque - Vice President of Exploration and Production
- Gustavo Adolfo Boadas Díaz - Deputy Minister of Refining
- Génesis Sabrina Ron Solano - Vice President of International Trade and Supply
- Luis Miguel González Núñez - Vice President of Gas
- Juan Carlos Díaz Socorro - Vice President of National Trade and Supply
- Heyfred Jhoselin Segovia Marrero - Vice President of Finance of PDVSA
- Ronny Rafael Romero Rodríguez - Vice President of International Affairs of PDVSA

=== Presidents of PDVSA ===
- Pedro Rafael Tellechea Ruíz (January 2023 – August 2024)
- Asdrúbal Chávez (April 2020 – January 2023)
- Manuel Quevedo (November 2017 – April 2020) Major general of the Bolivarian National Guard
- Nelson Martínez (August 2017 – November 2017) BS in chemistry, MS in Physical Chemistry University of Poitiers, France. Ph.D. in Chemistry University of Reading, UK.
- Eulogio Del Pino (September 2014 – August 2017) Exploration geophysics, Universidad Central de Venezuela
- Rafael Ramírez (November 2004 – September 2014) Minister of Energy and Oil (2005), M.Sc. Energy policy – UCV, B.Sc. Mechanical Engineering – ULA.
- Alí Rodríguez Araque (April 2002 – October 2004) Minister of Energy (1999), Secretary General OPEC (2001), Lic. Economics – UCV.
- Gastón Parra Luzardo (February 2002 – April 2002) Academic Vice-Rector – LUZ (1980–1984), Dean of the School of Social Sciences – LUZ (1972–1975). Lic. Economics – LUZ.
- Guaicaipuro Lameda Montero (October 2000 – February 2002) Brigadier General of the Venezuelan Army and Electrical Engineering, (University of the Pacific), M.Sc. economic planning.
- Héctor Ciavaldini (August 1999 - October 2000).
- Roberto Mandini (February 1999 – August 1999).
- Luis Giusti (March 1994 – February 1999) M.Sc. Petroleum Engineering – TU, B.Sc. Petroleum Engineering – LUZ
- Gustavo Roosen (March 1992 – March 1994) Minister of Education (1989), M.A. Comparative Law (NYU), B.A. Law – UCAB.
- Andres Sosa Pietri (March 1990 – March 1992).
- Juan Chacín Guzmán (October 1986 – March 1990).
- Brigido R. Natera (February 1984 – October 1986) B.S. Geology, Universidad Central de Venezuela, M.B.A. Stanford University, 1968.
- Humberto Calderón Berti (March 1983 – February 1984) Minister of Energy (1979–1982).
- Rafael Alfonzo Ravard (January 1976 – March 1983). General of the Venezuelan Army, civil engineering degree at the Massachusetts Institute of Technology

== Overseas assets ==
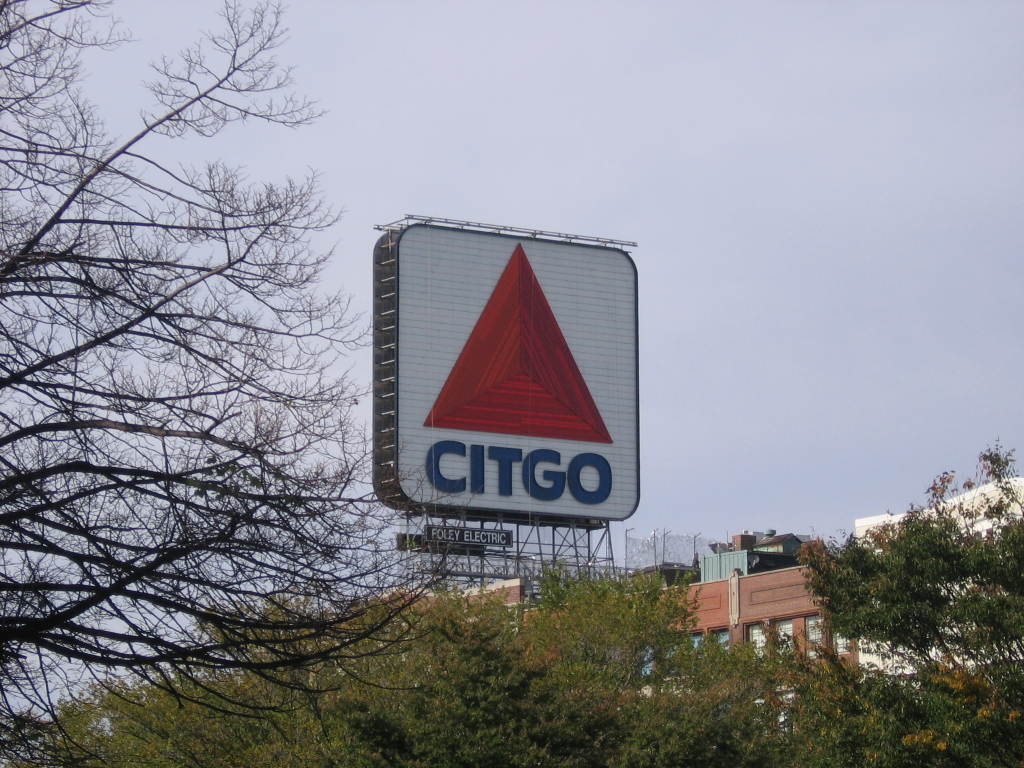
The Citgo sign as seen from Lansdowne St., Boston

- Citgo Petroleum Corporation, United States – Citgo is 100% owned by PDVSA.
- Nynäs Petroleum, Sweden – PDVSA owns a 50% stake with Finland's Neste Oil Oyj holding the other 50%.
- BOPEC, Bonaire petroleum corporation 100% owned by PDVSA.
- Isla refinery, Curaçao – PDVSA leases the Isla Refinery on the island, until its lease ended on December 31, 2019. The refinery has been operating at below capacity for at least two years, due to maintenance problems and difficulty supplying crude oil as third parties attempt to legally seize oil shipments in lieu of payment by Venezuela.
- PDVSA acquired a minority stake in the Jamaican state-owned oil refinery in 2006.

PDVSA has offices in Argentina, Bolivia, Brazil, Colombia, China, Cuba, Spain, the Netherlands, Guyana, Jamaica, Puerto Rico, Somalia, Honduras, Morocco, Canada, Hong Kong, Taiwan, Reunion, Gibraltar and Malta.

=== Former ===
- Hovensa LLC refinery, United States Virgin Islands – closed in 2015. Hovensa was jointly owned by PDVSA and Hess Oil Virgin Islands Corp.
- Bahamas Oil Refining Company (BORCO), Bahamas – PDVSA was the sole owner of this oil storage terminal in the Caribbean until April 2008. The new owners were Royal Vopak (20%) and First Reserve Corporation (80%). It is doing business as Vopak Terminal Bahamas. They in turn sold the facility to Buckeye Partners in 2011.
- Ruhr Oel, Germany – PDVSA was a 50% owner of Ruhr Oel GmbH, the other half belonging to BP's German unit Aral AG. PDVSA sold its part to Russia's Rosneft in October 2010.

== Media ==
PDVSA runs the Circuito Radial PDVSA radio network and the PDVSA TV internet channel.

== See also ==
- Deltaven
- Corporación Trebol Gas C.A.
- History of the Venezuelan oil industry
- Petrocaribe
- Nervis Villalobos
