= Vasylkivtsi rural hromada =

Rural hromada in Ternopil Oblast, Ukraine

Vasylkivtsi rural hromada Васильковецька сільська громада
- hromada
- Location within Ternopil Oblast Location within Ukraine
- Coordinates: 49°5′40″N 26°4′18″E
- Country: Ukraine
- Oblast: Ternopil Oblast
- Raion: Chortkiv Raion
- Administrative center: Vasylkivtsi

Government
  - Hromada head: Andrii Haidash

Area
  - Total: 170.2 km^{2} (65.7 sq mi)

Population (2022)
  - Total: 7,941
- Villages: 9
- Website: vasylkovecka-gromada.gov.ua

Vasylkivtsi rural territorial hromada (Ukrainian: Васильковецька територіальна громада, romanized: Vasylkovetska silska terytorialna hromada) is a hromada in Chortkiv Raion, Ternopil Oblast, Ukraine. The administrative center is the village of Vasylkivtsi. Its population is 7,941 (2022 estimate)

== History ==
It was formed on 24 July 2015, by merging Vasylkivtsi, Krohulets, Nyzhbirok, Staryi Nyzhbirok, Tseliivka, Chabarivka village councils of Husiatyn Raion.

In 2020, Zhabyntsi and Kotsiubyntsi village councils of Chortkiv Raion joined the community.

== Settlements ==
The hromada consists of 9 villages:

- Vasylkivtsi
- Zhabyntsi
- Kotsiubyntsi
- Krohulets
- Nyzhbirok
- Staryi Nyzhbirok
- Tseliiv
- Chabarivka
- Chahari
