= Paper Trail Media =

Investigative journalism newsroom

Paper Trail Media is an investigative start-up based in Munich. The editorial team, founded in 2022 by two Pulitzer Prize winners, Bastian Obermayer and Frederik Obermaier, works for the news magazine Der Spiegel, ZDF, the Austrian daily newspaper Der Standard and the Swiss Tamedia group. With Obermayer and Obermaier as well as the Austrian Christo Buschek, a total of three Pulitzer Prize winners work for Paper Trail Media.

== Well-known employees ==
- Sophia Baumann
- Christo Buschek
- Maria Christopher
- Hannes Munzinger
- Frederik Obermaier
- Bastian Obermayer
- Hakan Tanriverdi

== Xinjiang Police Files ==
In 2023, the Paper Trail Media journalists Frederik Obermaier and Bastian Obermayer, together with the Der Spiegel journalist Christoph Giesen, initiated the Xinjiang Police Files research into the mass internment of Uyghurs in Xinjiang. These were taken up by, among others, the UN human rights representative Michelle Bachelet in her criticism of the Chinese government.

== Vulkan Files ==
Paper Trail Media coordinated the Vulkan files leak revelations together with Spiegel in 2023. More than 50 journalists - including from The Washington Post, The Guardian and Le Monde - analyzed top secret data from the Russian company NTC Vulkan, which produces software for hacking attacks and disinformation campaigns for Russian secret services.

== Cyprus Confidential ==
In collaboration with the International Consortium of Investigative Journalists, Paper Trail Media examined over 3 million documents from Cyprus as part of the Cyprus Confidential investigation about shell companies through which, among other things, covert payments were made to the journalist Hubert Seipel, and the oligarch Alexei Mordashov tried to circumvent sanctions from the European Union against Russia.

== Other projects ==
The team has also been involved with Deforestation_Inc., the 'StoryKillers' project, and Russian Asset Tracker.

== Awards ==
The work and the reporters of paper trail media have received numerous awards, including:

- Otto-Brenner-Preis (2024)
- Rainer-Reichert-Preis (2024)
- IJ4EU-Impact-Award (2023 für die Xinjiang Police Files, 2024 für die sogenannten Storykillers-Recherchen und 2025 für die sogenannten Gaza-Project-Recherchen)
- SABEW Best in Business-Awards (2024)
- Deutscher Journalistenpreis (2023 für die Vulkan Files)
- TRACE-Award (2024 für die Cyprus Confidential-Recherchen)
- European Press Prize (Special Award)
