= Juan José Aranguren =

Argentine businessman

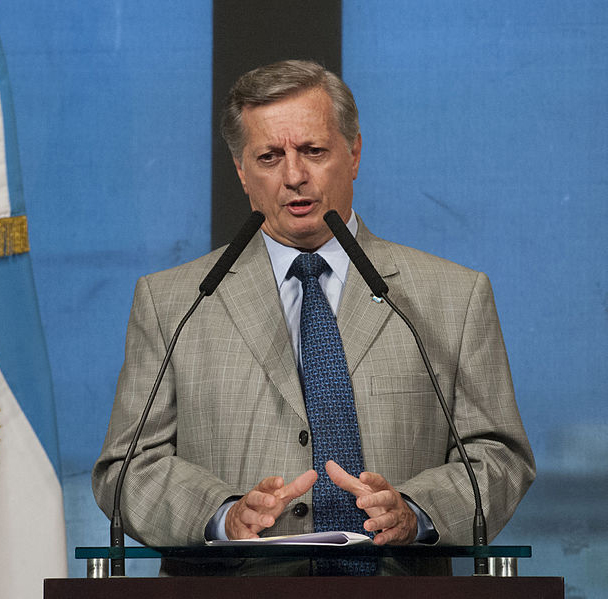

Minister of Energy of Argentina
- In office December 10, 2015 – June 28, 2018

Personal details
- Born: August 31, 1954 (age 72) Beccar, Argentina
- Party: Cambiemos
- Education: University of Buenos Aires
- Occupation: Businessman

Juan José Aranguren is an Argentine businessman. He was Chairman of Royal Dutch Shell of Argentina for fifteen years and served as Minister of Energy during the Mauricio Macri's administration.

== Early life and education ==
Aranguren was born in the Entre Ríos Province, and became a chemical engineer at the University of Buenos Aires.

== Career ==
Aranguren joined Shell Argentina in 1979, and was its director from 1997 to 2015. He opposed the administration of president Nestor and Cristina Kirchner and won several cases against the state for the state-controlled prices.

In 2015, Mauricio Macri appointed him Minister of Energy. Aranguren arranged the removal of state subsidies to electricity, gas, and water distribution, which caused a huge increase in taxes for those services.

Those increases were met by protests in numerous cities by people bearing banners, bugles, and noise-making cacerolazos. The government justified it as a required step to reduce the huge fiscal deficit, and pointed out that the subsidy system had almost ruined the whole energy distribution system. Macri explained this at the State of the State report, and Aranguren at an audience at the Congress. Several courts nulled the tax increase, as it had been ordered with a previous audience with customers to explain it, as required by law. The Supreme Court ratified the temporary halt to the tax increase, but only for residential customers. The customer audiences were celebrated in September.

== Controversies ==
=== Conflict of interest ===
Although Aranguren resigned from Shell to work as a minister of Energy, he still kept Shell shares for $16.3 million. There was a controversy, as some of his rulings benefited Shell, and he may have had a conflict of interest in it. Aranguren saidd that there was no conflict of interest, and subsequently sold his shares, as suggested by the anticorruption office. He considered that government transparency had to clear for the Argentine society.

=== Paradise Papers ===
On 5 November 2017, the Paradise Papers, a set of confidential electronic documents relating to offshore investment, revealed that Aranguren have managed two offshore companies, Shell Western Supply and Trading Limited and Sol Antilles y Guianas Limited, both subsidiaries of Royal Dutch Shell. One is the main bidder for the purchase of diesel oil by the current government through the state owned CAMMESA (Compañía Administradora del Mercado Mayorista Eléctrico).
