= Pelin Ünker =

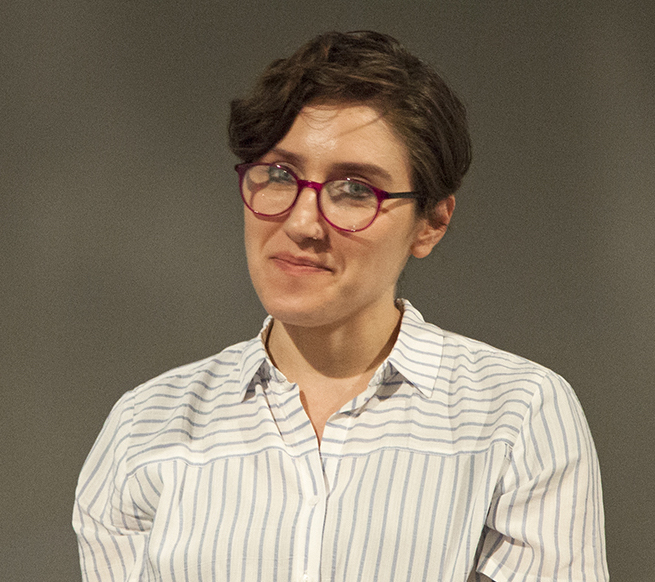
Pelin Ünker speaks at the Disruption Network Lab in 2019

Pelin Ünker ([pɛˈlin ynˈkɛr]) is a Turkish journalist and a member of the International Consortium of Investigative Journalists. In the late 2010s she investigated the Turkish dimension of the Paradise Papers affair.

She has worked for the Cumhuriyet newspaper since late 2000s and reported on the Panama Papers in 2016, but she left her job in Cumhuriyet in the aftermath of her reporting on Paradise Papers affairs in Turkey, which also led to a defamation suit against her, criticized by several international organizations as an attack on freedom of speech and press. By the end of 2016, almost half of the paper's reporters, columnists and executives had been jailed by the Erdoğan government. Cumhuriyet has since shifted its stance to align more closely with the government, with a number of its journalists sued or resigning, and its former chief editor, Can Dündar, fleeing the country. Since 2018 she works as a freelancer mostly associated with Turkish-language version of the Deutsche Welle.

== Paradise Papers lawsuits ==
The sons of Turkey's prime minister, Binali Yıldırım, described as "close friends" of Turkey's president Recep Tayyip Erdoğan, are listed in the papers as having business interests in tax havens. The sons, both doing maritime business, officially set up two companies in Malta, to avoid high Turkish tax rates. Both of the companies are registered under the names of the two sons, with the older son Erkam Yıldırım having more shares than the younger son Bülent Yıldırım in both companies. The companies, named Hawke Bay Marine Co. Ltd.(founded in 2004) and Black Eagle Marine Co. Ltd.(founded in 2007) are "active" in the available detailed data. One of the companies shared an address with a company that won a $7 million government contract.

The brothers, although publicly acknowledging those facts, sued journalist Pelin Ünker and the newspaper Cumhuriyet in 2018 after they published the story describing their involvement. In January 2019 a Turkish court sentenced Ünker to thirteen months in jail for "defamation and insult of public official", and separately fined the newspaper for "insult". The ICIJ's director, Gerard Ryle, criticized the sentence as an attack on free speech. She is the only journalist in the world sentenced for writing about the Paradise Papers investigation. Her sentencing has also been criticized by others, including the Netherlands Helsinki Committee and PEN America. Her prison sentence was overturned on appeal due to a statute of limitations, but the fine was allowed to stand.

Ünker has also been sued by Berat Albayrak, Turkey's finance and treasury minister and the president's son-in-law, first over her reporting on him related to Panama Papers, and later, about his connection with the Paradise Papers revelations. Both of those lawsuits were also dismissed.

The Netherlands Helsinki Committee concluded that "Because of her reporting on tax evasion schemes of Turkey's powerful, it is no longer possible for Ünker to work in Turkish mainstream media", stressing the problems surrounding freedom of the press issues in Turkey. Following the incident, in March 2019 the One Free Press Coalition included her in the list of world's ten most endangered journalists. In April 2019 the Investigative Reporters and Editors awarded her the Don Bolles Medal for courage.

== Pulitzer finalist for the FinCEN Files ==
In 2020, thousands of documents from the U.S. Treasury's Financial Crimes Enforcement Network (FinCEN) have been leaked to BuzzFeed News and the International Consortium of Investigative Journalists (ICIJ). Pelin Ünker worked on the FinCEN Files as part of the ICIJ team. The serie was named a finalist for the Pulitzer Prize in the International Reporting category in 2021.
