= Jean-Claude Bastos de Morais =

Swiss-Angolan businessman

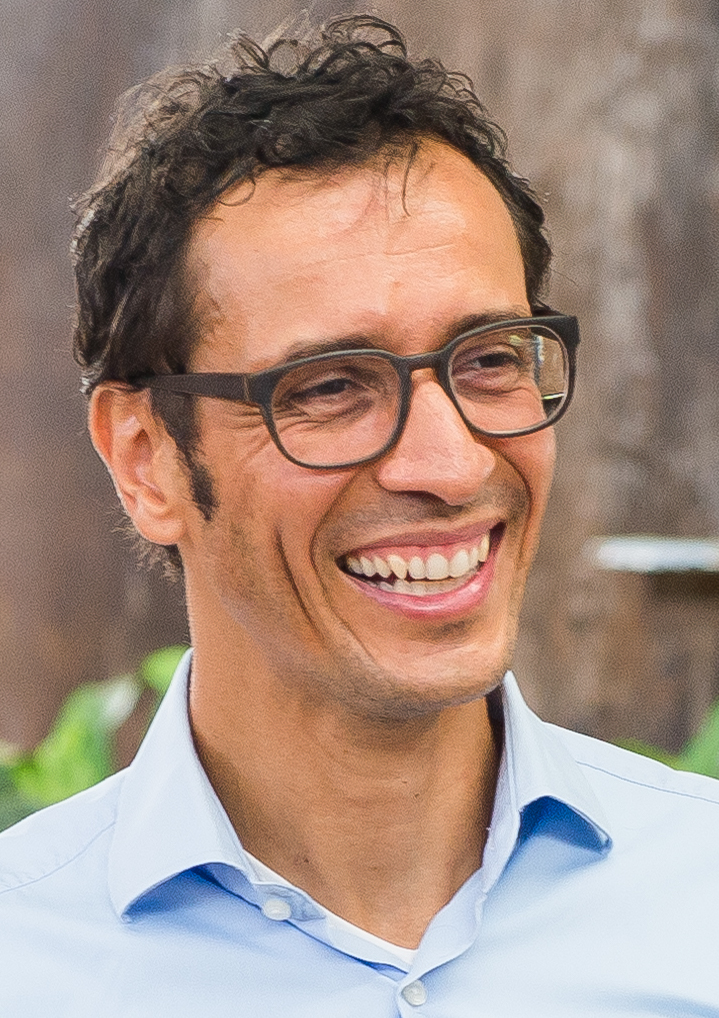

Personal details
- Born: 28 October 1967 (age 58) Fribourg, Switzerland
- Occupation: Entrepreneur
- Website: www.jeanclaudebastosdemorais.com

Jean-Claude Bastos de Morais (born 28 October 1967 in Fribourg) is a Swiss-Angolan entrepreneur. He founded Quantum Global Group, an international investment group with a particular focus on Africa and Banco Kwanza Invest, Angola's first investment bank.

Bastos was cited as one of the Top 100 Most Influential Africans by New African magazine in 2013 and 2017.

== Early life and education ==
Bastos was born on 28 October 1967 in Fribourg, Switzerland. He is of bi-national heritage. His father is from Angola and his mother is Swiss, coming from an entrepreneurial family. His maternal grand-father was an industrialist in the watch industry and invented the light inside the watch.

Bastos studied economics at the University of Fribourg and received a Master of Arts in Management. He financed his studies by starting a regional mergers and acquisitions business that sold small companies.

== Career ==
In 1989, Bastos joined Deloitte as a consultant and later Abegglen Management Partners. In 1995, he founded a venture capital company focused on Swiss SMEs.

In 2004, Bastos founded Quantum Capital S.A. in Luanda, Angola, the first company of the Quantum Global Group. In 2007, Quantum Global Investment Management was founded in Switzerland. As an asset management company for global liquid investments, Quantum Global also expanded into the real estate business after establishing Quantum Global Real Estate in June 2009. From 2012, Quantum Global together with Plaza, a joint venture with JLL subsidiary LaSalle, purchased office properties on Savile Row, Fifth Avenue and in Munich. The Tour Blanche in Paris followed in 2014. Other fields of activity of Quantum Global included private equity, portfolio management, and a laboratory for economic research.

In 2008, Bastos de Morais founded Banco Kwanza Invest, Angola's first investment bank.

In 2012, Bastos' asset management group Quantum Global was awarded the contract to manage the newly created Angolan sovereign wealth fund, the Fundo Soberano de Angola (FSDEA), with fund assets of US$5 billion.

He is the co-editor of the book Innovation Ethics. African and Global Perspectives co-published by Globethics.net and the AIF. The book looks at innovation ethics and the “ethical innovator.”

In 2015, Bastos was among a team of 31 authors from 15 nations who collaborated on The Convergence of Nations: Why Africa’s Time Is Now, which discussed how Africa can benefit from changes in the world political and economic environment. That September, Quantum Global became a member of the Forest Stewardship Council. In 2016, a fund managed by the group acquired the InterContinental Hotel in Lusaka.

From 2017 to 2018, Bastos de Morais was a member of the international council of the Belfer Center for Science and International Affairs.

After the Paradise Papers were leaked, the Mauritius Supreme Court froze US$519 million and a British court froze US$3 billion on Quantum Global accounts in April 2018. London's High Court dismissed the freezing of British bank accounts in July 2018, stating that the applicants of a freezing order against Bastos misrepresented their description, among other breaches of duty. In September 2018, Bastos was taken into pre-trial detention in Angola which was seen as an attempt to pressure Quantum Global and him. In March 2019, Angola dropped all charges and released Bastos, additionally paying him a settlement and lifting bank account freezes in Mauritius.

In 2020, Quantum Global Investment Management merged with Quantum Global Corporate Services.

=== Fábrica de Sabão ===
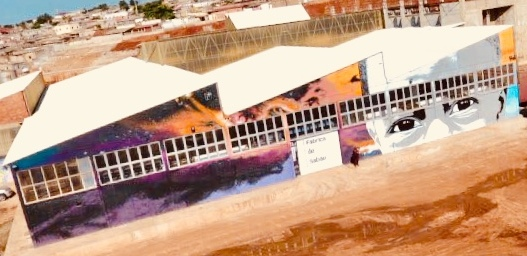
Fábrica de Sabão

In 2015, he launched the hybrid innovation hub, Fábrica de Sabão (The Soap Factory) to support innovation projects in Angola. Fábrica de Sabão, a former soap factory, was converted into a hybrid incubator, co-working space, maker-space, and accelerator hub. The hub was a collaboration with the government, which leases its premises. Fábrica de Sabão was built as an inclusive model to enable marginalized communities to participate in sustainable enterprise such as urban manufacturing.

== Philanthropy ==
In October 2011, Bastos founded the Kitangana Tennis Project for orphans in Angola. In 2017, his Quantum Global Group sponsored the Muhr Awards for Arab films at the Dubai International Film Festival. Additionally, Bastos sponsored a research project at the Center of Neuroscience ZNZ, a collaboration between the University of Zurich and the Swiss Federal Institute of Technology ETH. He also served on the advisory board of the Event Letterari Monte Verita Festival, the Official Monetary and Financial Institutions Forum (OMFIF) and the University of Cape Town Graduate School of Business.

=== African Innovation Foundation ===
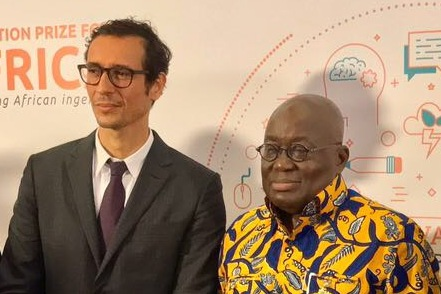
Bastos with Ghanaian President Nana Akufo-Addo

In 2009, he founded the African Innovation Foundation (AIF), which aimed to support sustainable projects in Africa. According to Bastos, his late Angolan grandmother inspired him to establish the AIF.

The Foundation's "Innovation Prize for Africa (IPA)" was launched in 2011 in cooperation with the United Nations Economic Commission for Africa (UNECA). The IPA held an annual competition honoring African entrepreneurs and innovators through investment in their ecosystems and business development. In 2012, the IPA was endorsed by a joint resolution of the African Union (AU) conference of ministers of finance, development and planning, and the United Nations Economic Commission for Africa (UN-ECA) conference of ministers of finance, planning and economic development. The AU/UN-ECA resolution invited "African governments and the private sector to contribute to financing the African Science, Technology and Innovation Endowment Fund and the Innovation Prize for Africa" to ensure the sustainability of the IPA.

In 2016, the Innovation Prize for Africa celebrated its 5th anniversary, and the AIF signed a Memorandum of Understanding (MoU) with the World Intellectual Property Organization (WIPO) for cooperation to support African innovators. In February 2017, the AIF signed a MoU with the Botswana Innovation Hub to support innovations in Botswana. In addition to the IPA, the AIF founded the ZuaHub, a platform connecting innovators with resources. By 2017, the IPA had a database of over 6,000 innovators from 51 African countries.

SEED is a collaboration with the African Innovation Foundation (AIF), a Swiss-registered foundation. SEED was published to reinforce the value and benefit of seeding innovation in all fields of development for a rich and prosperous Africa.

==== African Law Library ====
The AIF also initiated the African Law Library (ALL). The project was launched on 28 November 2013 at the African Union's headquarters in Addis Ababa, Ethiopia. With ALL Bastos implemented his idea of an online portal offering access to a wide range of legal documents as well as law and governance texts from African countries. The Huffington Post reported that 'in June 2014 alone, more than 10,000 research sessions were initiated on the African Law Library platform'. In March 2015 over 4,500 regional and national court cases, 3,600 legislative acts and 8,000 secondary sources from eight African countries were published online.
