= Paradise Papers =

2017 documents leak related to offshore investment

Countries with politicians, public officials, or close associates named in the leak

The Paradise Papers are a set of over 13.4 million confidential electronic documents relating to offshore investments that were leaked to the German journalists Frederik Obermaier and Bastian Obermayer of the newspaper Süddeutsche Zeitung. The newspaper shared them with the International Consortium of Investigative Journalists and a network of more than 380 journalists. Some of the details were first made public on 5 November 2017, and further stories continue to appear.

The documents originate from the law firm Appleby, the corporate services providers Estera and Asiaciti Trust, and business registries in nineteen tax jurisdictions. They contain the names of more than 120,000 people and companies. Among those whose financial affairs are mentioned are, separately, AIG, the then Prince Charles and Queen Elizabeth II, the president of Colombia Juan Manuel Santos, and the US Secretary of Commerce Wilbur Ross.

The release of the documents resulted in scandal, litigation, and the loss of positions for a number of those named, as well as in legal action against the media outlets and journalists who published the papers.

== Background ==
On 20 October 2017, an anonymous Reddit user hinted at the existence of the Paradise Papers. Later that month, the International Consortium of Investigative Journalists (ICIJ) approached the offshore law firm Appleby with allegations of wrongdoing. Appleby stated that some of its data had been stolen in a cyberattack the previous year and denied the allegations made by the ICIJ. After media outlets began reporting on the documents, the firm said there was "no evidence of wrongdoing", adding that it was "a law firm which advises clients on legitimate and lawful ways to conduct their business" and that it did "not tolerate illegal behaviour".

Appleby also asserted that the firm "was not the subject of a leak but of a serious criminal act" and that "this was an illegal computer hack". It added: "Our systems were accessed by an intruder who deployed the tactics of a professional hacker."

The documents were acquired by the German newspaper Süddeutsche Zeitung, which had also obtained the Panama Papers in 2016. According to the BBC, the name "Paradise Papers" reflects "the idyllic profiles of many of the offshore jurisdictions whose workings are unveiled"—the so‑called tax havens, or "tax paradises".

The data breach comprises some 13.4 million documents—totalling approximately 1.4 terabytes—drawn from two offshore service providers, Appleby and Asiaciti Trust, and from the company registers of nineteen tax havens. Journalists from Süddeutsche Zeitung contacted the ICIJ, which has been investigating the documents together with 100 media partners. The consortium made the data available to these partners using Neo4j, a graph‑database platform designed for connected data, and Linkurious, graph‑visualisation software. This enabled journalists across the globe to work together on the investigation. The documents were released by the consortium on 5 November 2017.

== Companies named ==
According to the papers, Allergan (the manufacturer of Botox), Allianz, Apple Inc., Facebook, Global Vantedge, McDonald's, Nike, Inc., Siemens, The Walt Disney Company, Twitter, Uber, Walmart, and Yahoo! are among the corporations that own offshore companies. According to The Express Tribune, "Apple, Nike, and Facebook avoided billions of dollars in tax using offshore companies."

Among the Indian companies listed in the papers are Apollo Tyres, the Essel Group, D S Construction, Emaar MGF, GMR Group, Havells, Hinduja Group, the Hiranandani Group, Jindal Steel, the Sun Group and Videocon.

=== Apple ===
A great deal of the company's intangible property was exposed around the time of an internal Apple Inc. reorganisation of three Irish subsidiaries. The company's 2015 gross domestic product showed a 26% increase, and close to $270 billion of intangible assets suddenly appeared in Ireland as the year began – more than the entire value of all residential property in the country. This may indicate that Apple took advantage of a tax incentive known as a capital allowance, which gives Irish companies generous tax breaks for buying intangible property – essentially intellectual property like patents. In other words, Apple (some suggest) transferred them to a subsidiary located in Ireland for the tax incentives, and didn't have to pay any tax on the transaction in Bermuda either, on the value it declared on the property when it sold them to itself.

Following a 2013 US Senate investigation, which featured testimony by CEO Tim Cook, Ireland announced that henceforth Irish companies would be required to declare tax residency somewhere in the world. Apple had been paying a lower rate of corporate taxes in Ireland in a so-called sweetheart deal. This attracted the attention of EU regulators as many multinationals were doing the same thing. As the tax break in the Netherlands came to a scheduled end, Apple's law firm, Baker McKenzie, researched island tax havens, asking Appleby officials in numerous jurisdictions to confirm "that an Irish company can conduct management activities ... without being subject to taxation in your jurisdiction." Two of the subsidiaries moved to Jersey and took intellectual property with them. The third is receiving tax breaks in Ireland for buying Apple IP from another Apple subsidiary.

The Jersey Financial Services Commission (JFSC) issued a statement regarding Apple on 7 November 2017. The JFSC confirmed that the two Apple subsidiaries referred to by the media are not Jersey-registered companies and their understanding is that Apple funds relating to these entities have not been remitted to or held in the Island.

The JFSC states that it has not seen any of the documentation that the International Consortium of Investigative Journalists (ICIJ) claims to hold following the Appleby data breach. If the ICIJ possesses data of a criminal or regulatory nature which relates to business activities in Jersey then the JFSC requested that this information be shared with them and, if there is any evidence of regulatory wrongdoing, they would then investigate and take action if appropriate.

The Government of Jersey (States of Jersey) also issued a statement of similar effect on 7 November 2017.

The jurisdiction of Jersey has recently been independently assessed as fully compliant with international regulatory guidelines on tax transparency.

The EU, under the leadership of Jean-Claude Juncker, threatened to sue Ireland over its tax deals, although Juncker himself had approved similar tax deals in his own country, Luxembourg. Apple paid all of its taxes in Ireland as required by that country, so Ireland is appealing the EU decision. HP, Nike, Microsoft and others use the same tax arrangements in Ireland, Luxembourg and other countries, but Apple is frequently cited as a media example. Irish companies are required to pay taxes in Ireland, but if they convince authorities that they are "managed and controlled" from abroad, the companies may win an exemption.

As of November 2017, Apple held $252 billion offshore. However, Apple has previously publicly stated that it reinvests post-tax earnings (generated outside the US) into the global economy via investment funds held offshore.

=== Avianca ===
Germán Efromovich, founder of Synergy Group, is linked to an offshore conglomerate used for the aero-commercial holding business with ramifications in Bermuda, Panama, and Cyprus. Efromovich used a Panamanian offshore that hid more than 20 firms located in tax havens. The conglomerate was used by Synergy Group's subsidiary Avianca Holdings in the purchase of MacAir Jet, now Avianca Argentina, an aircraft company owned by Macri Group, for an amount of $10 million, allowing Avianca to make headway in the low-cost carrier business in Argentina. The Argentine government accepted the offshores as a financial guarantee to assign air routes to Avianca. The whole operation of assigning air routes was investigated by the Argentine federal justice system in a case called "Avianca" in which the President of Argentina Mauricio Macri and other officials were imputed.

=== DST Global ===
A Russia-owned firm, VTB Bank, put $191 million into DST Global, an investment firm part of Mail.ru Group and was founded by Russian billionaire Yuri Milner, which used it to buy a large share of Twitter in 2011. A subsidiary of the Kremlin-controlled Gazprom funded an investment company that partnered with DST Global to buy shares in Facebook, reaping millions when the social media giant went public in 2012. Twitter similarly went public in 2013. The US government sanctioned VTB in 2014 because of the Russian military intervention in Crimea, but DST Global had by then sold its stake in Twitter. Four days after the Facebook IPO, a DST Global subsidiary sold more than 27 million shares of Facebook for approximately $1 billion.

=== Glencore ===
In 2009, Glencore, an Anglo–Swiss multinational commodity trading and mining company, loaned $45 million to Israeli billionaire Dan Gertler in exchange for his help with officials of the Democratic Republic of Congo in negotiations over a joint venture with state-owned Gécamines at the Katanga copper mine.

One of the Katanga board members was Glencore major shareholder Telis Mistakidis, a former employee whose stock options made him a billionaire in the IPO. Glencore, which had effectively taken over Katanga, agreed to vote for the joint venture. The loan document specifically provided that repayment would be owed if agreement was not reached within three months. Gertler and Glencore each have denied wrongdoing. Appleby had worked for Glencore and its founder Marc Rich on major projects in the past, even after his indictment in 1983. Rich was indicted in the United States on federal charges of tax evasion and making controversial oil deals with Iran during the Iran hostage crisis. He received a controversial presidential pardon from Bill Clinton on 20 January 2001, Clinton's last day in office.

A separate ICIJ project found that tax auditors in Burkina Faso accused a Glencore subsidiary of deducting from its taxes "fictitious" payments to other Glencore subsidiaries, and of selling the zinc from its mine (to another Glencore company) in unrefined form to minimise its revenue. Its CEO told shareholders before this that it expected a spike in demand, which did materialise. The mine is owned by Nantou Mining SA, which is owned by Merope Inc, a Bermuda shell company set up by Appleby with directors provided by the firm. Glencore sold Merope in April 2017 but before that, it was 100% owned by Glencore Finance (Bermuda) Ltd, which was, according to a document from the Paradise Papers leaks, 100% owned by Glencore Group Funding Ltd of the United Arab Emirates, an entity in turn 100% owned by Swiss firm Glencore International AG, itself a wholly owned subsidiary of Glencore plc, registered in Jersey.

Documents were also discovered discussing Glencore's desire to keep its substantial stake in SwissMarine a secret, and that although the subsidiary's annual report showed revenues of $1.9 billion in 2014, Glencore did not mention the subsidiary in its disclosures to the London Stock Exchange or in any other public filing because, it said, it did not consider this a significant investment.

The Australian branch of Glencore has been demonstrated to have carried out some $25 billion in cross-currency interest rate swaps, complex financial instruments the Australian Taxation Office suspects of being used to avoid paying taxes in Australia. The Australian High Court recently held that documents revealed in the Paradise Papers leak could be used by the Australian Taxation Office to assess Glencore's tax obligations, despite legal privilege.

=== Nike ===
The Appleby documents detail how Nike boosted its after-tax profits by, among other manoeuvres, transferring ownership of its Swoosh trademark to a Bermudian subsidiary, Nike International Ltd. This transfer allowed the subsidiary to charge royalties to its European headquarters in Hilversum, Netherlands, effectively converting taxable company profits to an account payable in tax-free Bermuda. Although the subsidiary was effectively run by executives at Nike's main offices in Beaverton, Oregon – to the point where a duplicate of the Bermudian company's seal was needed – for tax purposes the subsidiary was treated as based in Bermuda. Its profits were not declared in Europe and came to light only because of a mostly unrelated case in US Tax Court, where papers filed by Nike briefly mention royalties in 2010, 2011 and 2012 totalling $3.86 billion. Under an arrangement with Dutch authorities, the tax break was to expire in 2014, so another reorganisation transferred the intellectual property from the Bermudian company to a Dutch commanditaire vennootschap or limited partnership, Nike Innovate CV.

Dutch law treats income earned by a CV as if it had been earned by the principals, who owe no tax in the Netherlands if they do not reside there. One in six dollars of foreign profit earned by US multinationals was earned, at least on paper, through a Dutch CV subsidiary. Companies with similar structures include Tesla, Inc., NetApp and Uber.

=== Odebrecht ===
Appleby managed 17 offshore companies for Odebrecht, a Brazilian conglomerate, and at least one of them was used as a vehicle for paying bribes in Operation Car Wash. Some of these offshore companies are publicly known to operate for Odebrecht in Africa and be involved in bribes. Among those involved in the operation who also are named in the papers are Marcelo Odebrecht, Brazilian businessman and former Odebrecht CEO, his father Emílio Odebrecht and his brother Maurício Odebrecht.

=== PokerStars ===
Appleby and various banks in the Isle of Man, including Conister Bank, owned by Arron Banks and Jim Mellon, did business with PokerStars and its founders, Mark Scheinberg and his father Isai Scheinberg, until it was sold for $4.9 billion in 2014 to The Stars Group, formerly known as Amaya. PokerStars and its founders were pursued by the US Department of Justice for allegedly money laundering billions until they negotiated a settlement on 31 July 2012. The Stars Group along with its former member of board of directors Wesley Clark and former CEO David Baazov also did business with Appleby. In March 2016, David Baazov and other executives were charged by Canadian regulators with multiple securities fraud charges related to the acquisition of PokerStars.

== People named ==
=== Africa ===
==== Algeria ====
Saadi Yacef, freedom fighter, author, and politician, appears in the Papers in connection with a trust in the Cayman Islands, along with a former energy minister, the family of a former foreign minister and their South Pacific holdings.

==== Angola ====
An opposition party, UNITA, called for an investigation into alleged diversions from the country's sovereign wealth fund. Jean-Claude Bastos de Morais, a close associate of the son of former long-term president José Eduardo dos Santos, has invested over $2 billion from the country's sovereign wealth fund in Mauritius, according to Appleby documents. In a 20-month period, he was paid over $41 million in management fees, and invested much of the money in his own projects.

The Supreme Court of Mauritius later froze 91 bank accounts associated with Bastos as part of an inquiry into his investments for the Angolan sovereign wealth fund, and suspended the licences of seven investment companies linked to Bastos' Quantum Global.

==== Ghana ====
Ibrahim Mahama, brother of former president of Ghana John Mahama, registered a company in the Isle of Man to hold the registration for his private jet, according to Appleby documents. Mahama, the CEO of Engineers & Planners Company Limited, is also under investigation for allegedly issuing bad checks. In 2016, Ghanaian authorities took his company to court for allegedly not making social security payments. The case was later settled. Ghanaian Finance Minister Ken Ofori-Atta was identified as a co-director of an offshore company with outgoing president of Liberia, Ellen Johnson Sirleaf.

==== Kenya ====
Sally Kosgei, member of parliament 2008–2013 and minister of agriculture from 2010 to March 2013, owned a million-dollar flat near Harrods in London through an offshore she told Appleby was funded by her flower-export company.

==== Liberia ====
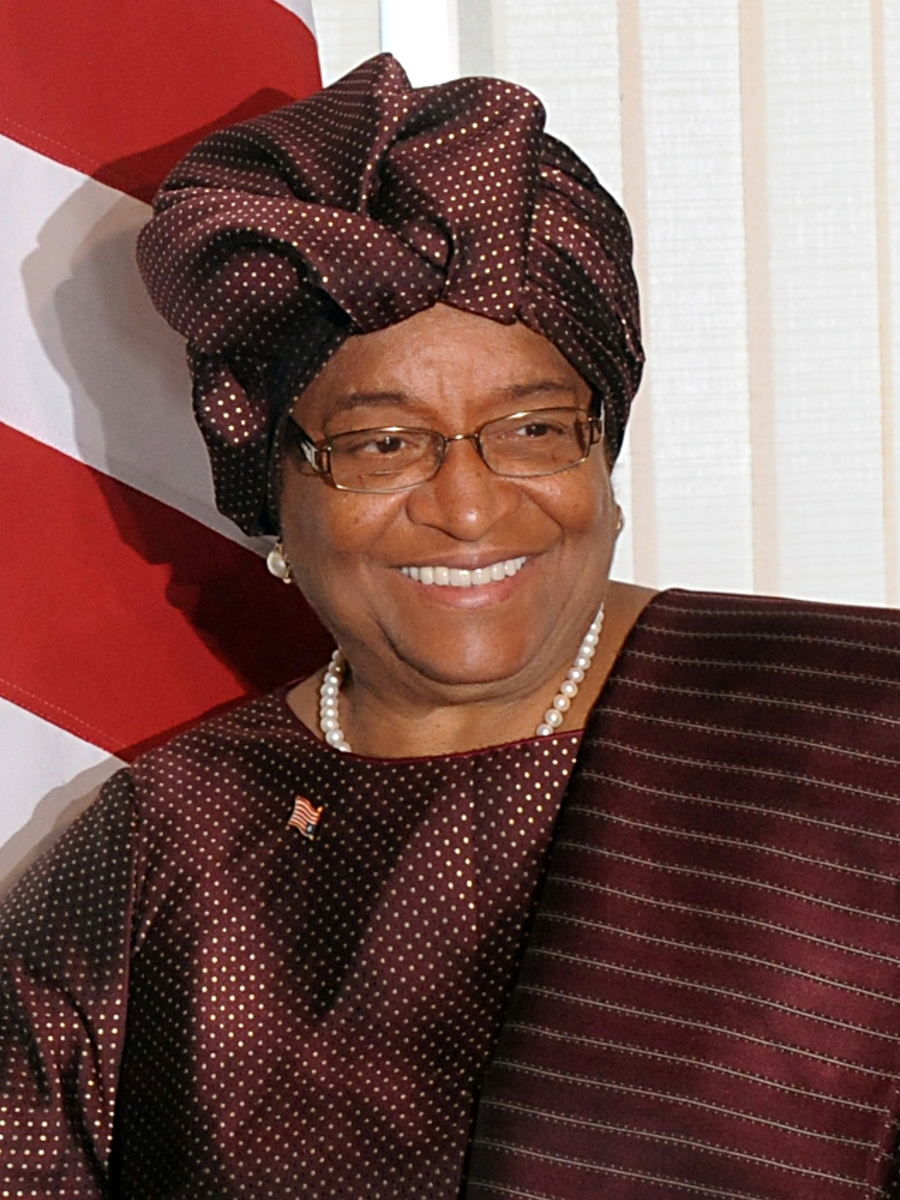
Liberian President Ellen Johnson Sirleaf is listed in the Paradise Papers.

Liberian president Ellen Johnson Sirleaf is listed in the papers as a director of the Bermuda company Songhai Financial Holdings Ltd. a subsidiary of Databank's finance, fund management and investment company Databank Brokerage Ltd., from April 2001 until September 2012. The Ghanaian Minister for Finance and Economic Planning, Ken Ofori-Atta, was a co-founder of Databank and a co-director, with Johnson Sirleaf, of Songhai Financial Holdings.

==== Nigeria ====
Aliko Dangote, then Africa's richest man with an estimated wealth of 12.1 billion, was linked to shell companies residing in tax havens by the Paradise Papers and, previously, by the Panama Papers, then, subsequently, by the Pandora Papers.

President of the Nigerian Senate Bukola Saraki is listed in the papers as a director and a shareholder of Tenia Ltd., a company established in the Cayman Islands in April 2001.

==== Uganda ====
Foreign Minister Sam Kutesa is listed as a beneficiary, along with his daughter, of a trust which holds the Seychelles-based Katonga Investments Ltd. Katonga gave as its source of income Enhas Uganda, another Kutesa-owned company criticised in a parliamentary committee as part of privatisation it said had been "manipulated and taken advantage of by a few politically powerful people who sacrifice the people's interests". Kutesa was also president of the United Nations General Assembly in 2014–2015.

Kutesa told the Daily Monitor he had never done anything with the company.

=== Asia ===
==== Azerbaijan ====
President Ilham Aliyev and his family were involved in offshore dealings according to the leaked documents. The Panama Papers allegedly revealed that the Aliyev family had secret offshore companies used for various financial transactions, including the ownership of luxury properties and involvement in lucrative business deals.

==== Hong Kong ====
Jim Watkins, owner of known Neo-Nazi recruitment image board 8chan, is listed in the papers.

==== India ====
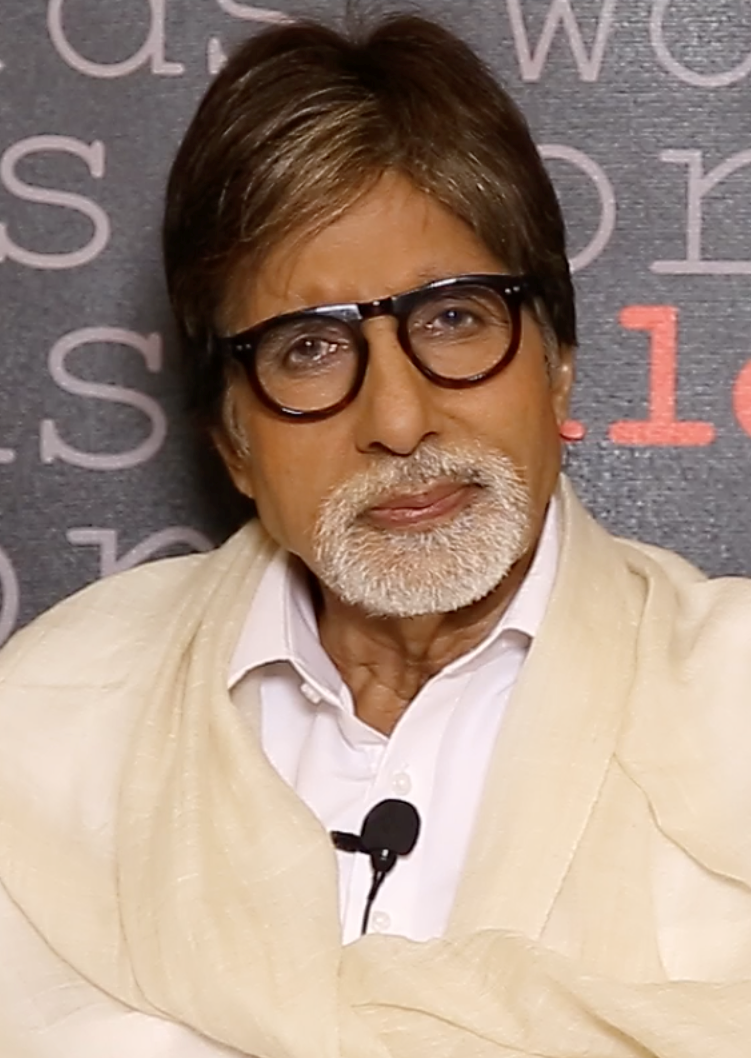
Actor Amitabh Bachchan is listed in the Paradise Papers.

India ranks 19th out of the 180 countries represented in the data in terms of the number of names. In all, there are 714 Indians in the tally, including noted political leaders like Minister of State for Civil Aviation Jayant Sinha, notable names like actor Amitabh Bachchan (a shareholder in a Bermuda-based digital media company), Dr Ranjan Pai of Manipal Group, former Member of Parliament of the Rajya Sabha and Vijay Mallya, an Indian fugitive former businessman and politician.

The papers revealed that Mallya sold United Spirits to Diageo in 2013, which it later approached London-based law firm Linklaters to restructure the group structure created by Mallya. With three other subsidiaries based in the UK, United Spirits was allegedly involved in diverting funds amounting to $1.5 billion.

By July 2021, the Government of India identified undeclared assets worth about ₹246 crore (equivalent to ₹301 crore or US$32 million in 2026) following the investigation.

==== Indonesia ====
Two children of deceased former president and dictator Suharto, Tommy and Mamiek, in addition to opposition party leader Prabowo Subianto (Suharto's former son-in-law) and businessman-turned-opposition politician Sandiaga Uno, are listed in the papers. The Directorate General of Taxes released a statement that they will follow up on the information provided on Indonesian taxpayers.

==== Japan ====
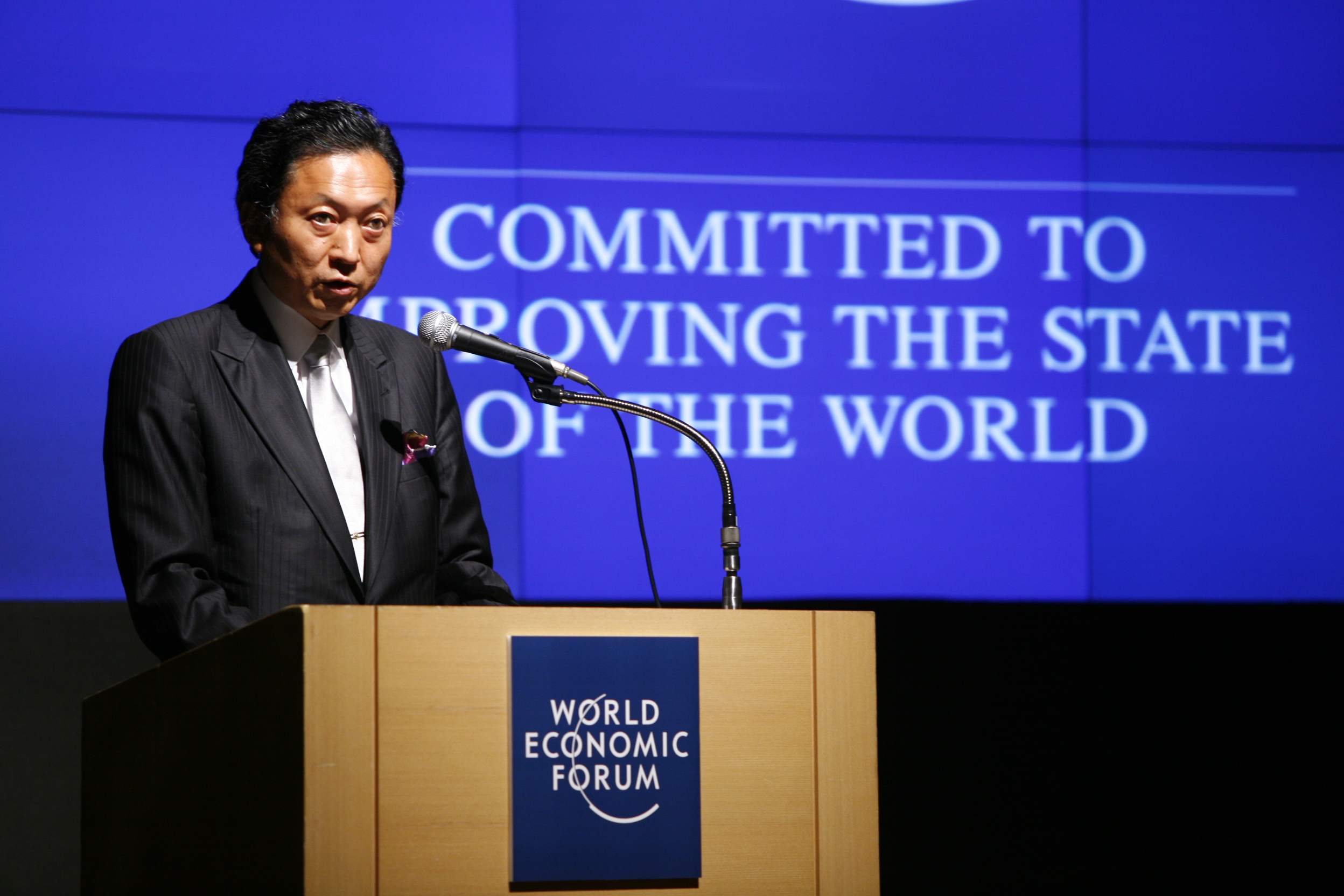
Former Japanese Prime Minister Yukio Hatoyama

Former Japanese prime minister Yukio Hatoyama is listed in the papers. The Bermuda-incorporated company, Hoifu Energy Group, is listed on the Stock Exchange of Hong Kong and appointed Hatoyama honorary chairman in 2013 because of his "amicable relationship" with the oil industry, a sector in which Hoifu planned to expand. The principal shareholder of the company was Hui Chi Ming. Neil Bush, brother of George W. Bush, was a director (deputy chairman) of the company.

==== Kazakhstan ====
Former Minister of Oil and Gas Sauat Mynbayev is listed as an original shareholder of Meridian Capital Ltd. Former BTA Bank Chairman Mukhtar Ablyazov is documented for his ownership of Cayman Island-registered CFJ Star Trust, which may have been used in his alleged embezzlement and mismanagement of $10 billion of BTA money. The embezzlement is one of the largest cases of financial fraud in history.

==== Pakistan ====
Former prime minister Shaukat Aziz is listed in the papers, having set up a trust called the Antarctic Trust owned by a Delaware corporation. Aziz, a former Citibank executive, told the ICIJ he had set the trust up for estate planning purposes and that the funds had come from his employment at Citibank. An internal Appleby document raised concerns about warrants issued for him in connection with the killing of a local leader. Aziz dismissed both the murder charge and the allegations of financial impropriety.

==== Philippines ====
Eduardo V. Manalo, Executive Minister of the Iglesia ni Cristo since 2009, was named according to data from the Aruba corporate registry.

=== Europe ===
==== Austria ====
Alfred Gusenbauer was head of the Social Democratic Party of Austria from 2000 to 2008 and Austria's chancellor from January 2007 to December 2008. He is listed as a director for Novia Management, a Maltese company listed as a shareholder in Novia Funds Sicav Plc, also Malta-based, which includes among its other shareholders Tal Silberstein, who was arrested in 2017 with Beny Steinmetz on charges of money laundering, then released. Silberstein had served as Gusenbauer's campaign advisor.

==== France ====
The French filmmaker Jean-Jacques Annaud is listed in the papers. As a result of the investigation, according to his lawyer, the filmmaker informed French tax authorities in the month preceding the release of the papers about his offshore holdings.

==== Greece ====
Mareva Grabowski is listed in the Paradise Papers. She is married to Kyriakos Mitsotakis, who later became Prime Minister of Greece. She owns 50% of an offshore company, Eternia Capital Management in the Cayman Islands. This match was verified in Appleby and listed in Cayman records on 30 March 2010.

In total, 2.829 Greek names are listed in the papers, including several prominent businesspeople.

==== Ireland ====
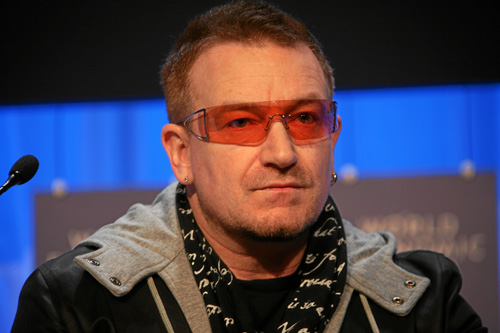
Bono is named in the papers.

U2 lead singer Bono is listed in the papers as an investor in a Lithuanian shopping centre via a Malta-based company. Limerick's first directly elected mayor, John Moran, was also listed in the leaked documents.

==== Lithuania ====
Antanas Guoga, a Member of the European Parliament, is named in the papers.

==== Montenegro ====
Ana Kolarević, sister of the former Montenegrin Prime Minister and President Milo Đukanović, who was in power from 1991 to 2016, is listed in the Paradise Papers.

==== Serbia ====
Nenad Popovic, Serbian Minister for Innovation and Technology and owner of the Russian conglomerate ABS Electro has a residence in a wealthy Zürich suburb, known for its tax shelters. The residence application and tax returns were initiated by PricewaterhouseCoopers, which handles offshore companies owned by Popovic. Those entities were also implicated in money laundering and tax evasion accusations, explicitly mentioned in the Paradise Papers.

==== Spain ====
In Spain, the first political authority that appears is the former mayor of Barcelona Xavier Trias, artist José María Cano and billionaire Daniel Maté. Businessman Juan Villalonga, CEO of Telefónica 1996 to 2000, registered two companies in tax havens.

==== Switzerland ====
Quantum Global Group, an investment bank owned by Jean-Claude Bastos de Morais, managed the Angolan wealth fund invested in seven investment funds in Mauritius and received an annual fee of 2 per cent to 2.5 per cent of capital under management per year.

==== Turkey ====
The sons of Turkey's former prime minister, Binali Yıldırım, are listed in the papers. The sons, both doing maritime business, officially set up two companies in Malta, to avoid high Turkish tax rates. Both of the companies are registered under the names of the two sons, with the older son Erkam Yıldırım having more shares than the younger son Bülent Yıldırım in both companies. Companies, named Hawke Bay Marine Co. Ltd.(founded in 2004) and Black Eagle Marine Co. Ltd.(founded in 2007) are seen as "active" in the available detailed data.

The brothers sued journalist Pelin Ünker and the newspaper Cumhuriyet in 2018 after they published the revelations. Cumhuriyet reported that one of the companies shared an address with a company that won a $7 million government contract. In January 2019 a Turkish court sentenced Ünker to thirteen months in jail for "defamation and insult", and separately fined the newspaper for "insult". The prison sentence was overturned on appeal due to a statute of limitations, although the fine was allowed to stand.

==== United Kingdom ====
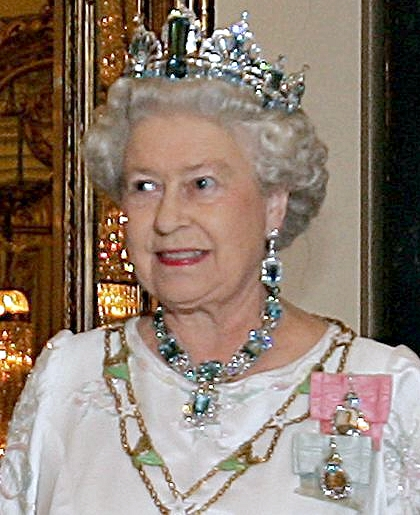
The Paradise Papers show that the Duchy of Lancaster, a private estate of Queen Elizabeth II, held investments in the Cayman Islands and Bermuda.

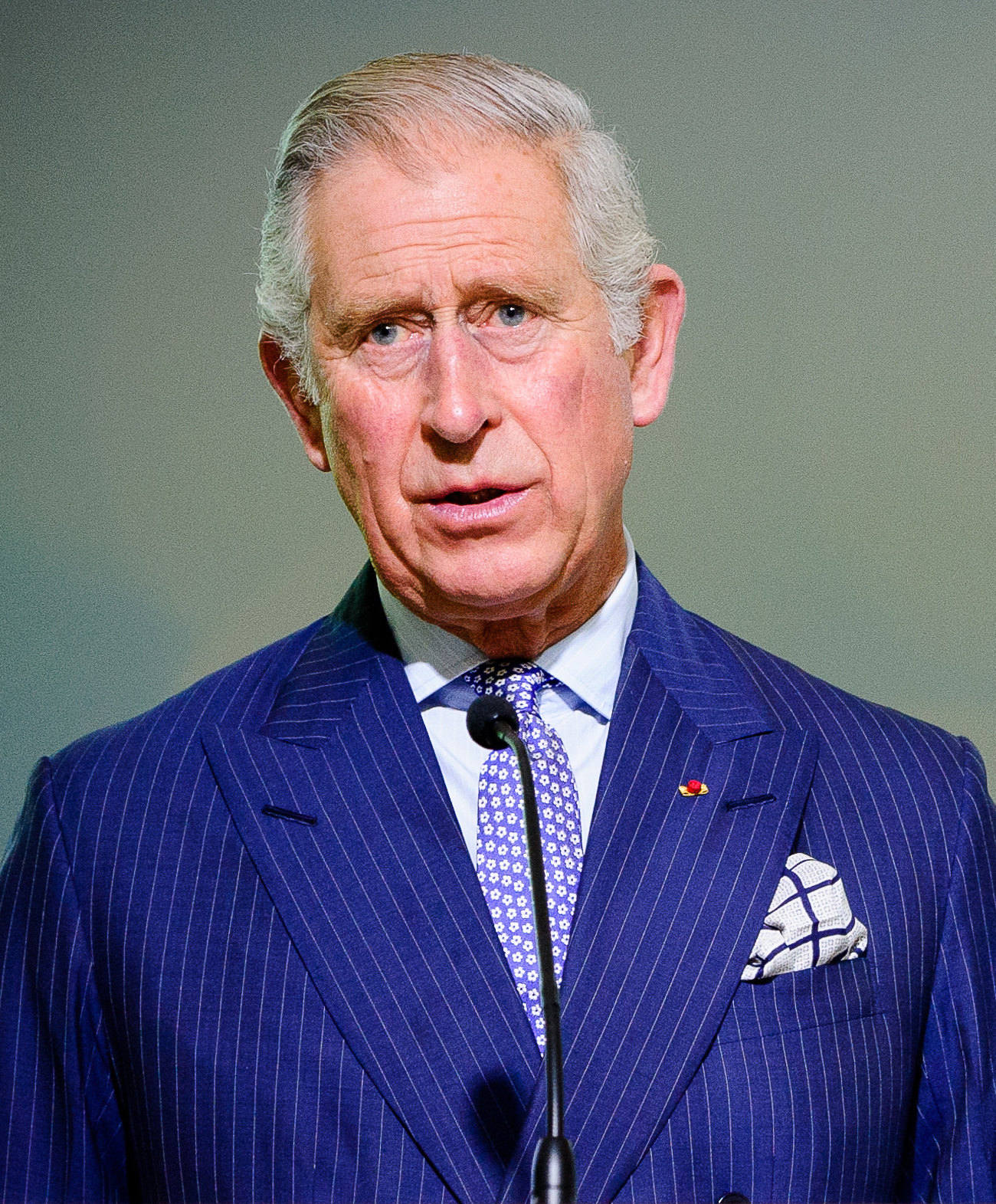
The Paradise Papers also show that the Duchy of Cornwall, a possession of Prince Charles, invested in a Bermuda-based carbon credits trading company.

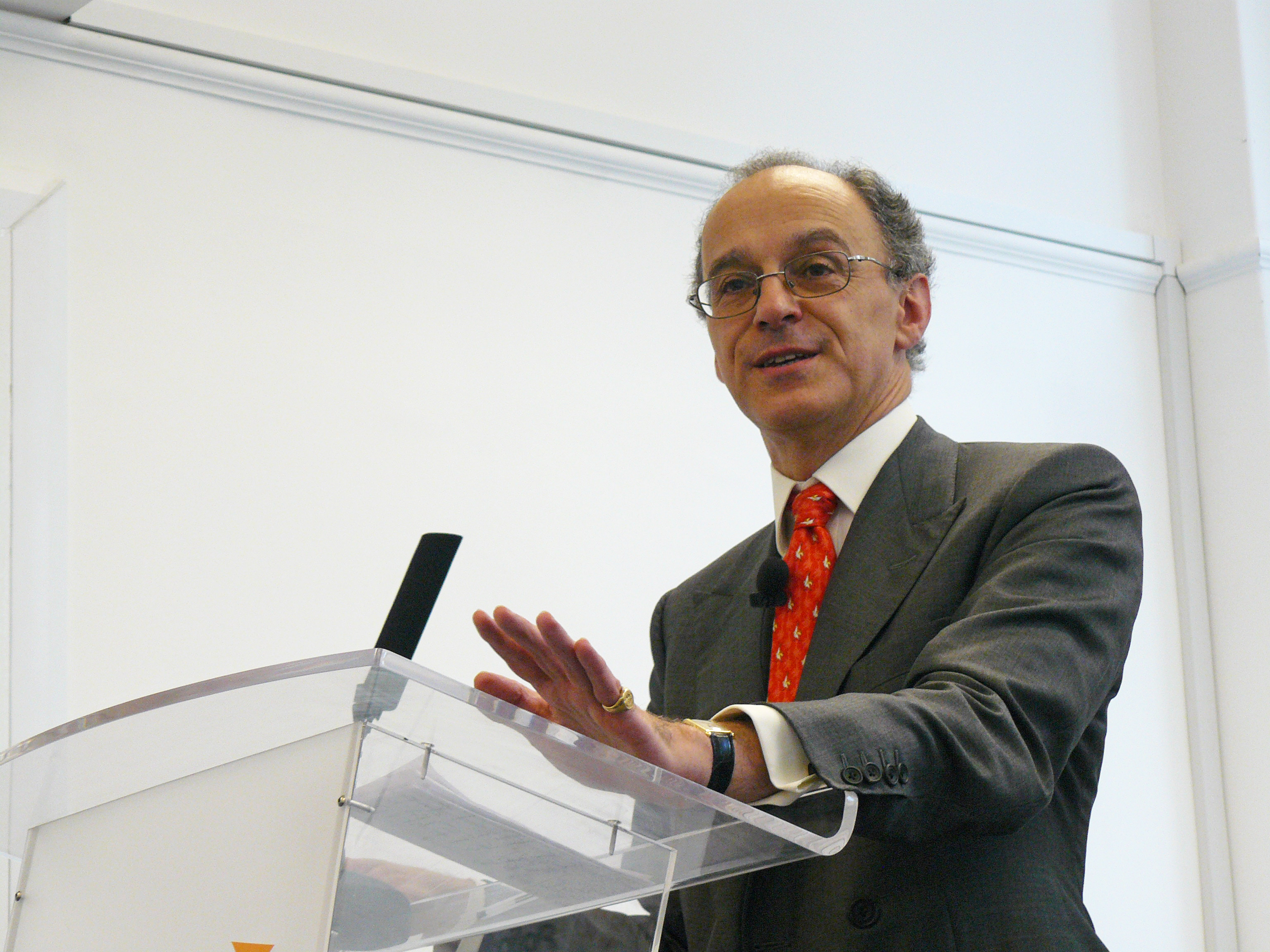
Lord Sassoon president of the international Financial Action Task Force on Money Laundering

The papers show that the Duchy of Lancaster, a private estate of Queen Elizabeth II, held investments in two offshore financial centres, the Cayman Islands and Bermuda. Both are British Overseas Territories of which she is monarch, and nominally appoints governors. Britain handles foreign policy for both islands to a large extent, but Bermuda has been self-governing since 1620. The Duchy's investments included First Quench Retailing off-licences and rent-to-own retailer BrightHouse. Labour Party Leader Jeremy Corbyn posited whether the Queen should apologise, saying anyone with money offshore for tax avoidance should "not just apologise for it, [but] recognise what it does to our society". A spokesman for the Duchy said that all of their investments are audited and legitimate and that the Queen voluntarily pays taxes on income she receives from Duchy investments.

The papers also show that in June 2007, the Duchy of Cornwall, a possession of Prince Charles, invested $113,500 in Sustainable Forestry Management, a Bermuda-based carbon credits trading company run by Hugh van Cutsem.

Four weeks after the Duchy of Cornwall purchased shares in Sustainable Forestry Management, Prince Charles made a speech criticising the European Union Emission Trading Scheme and the Kyoto Protocol for excluding carbon credits from rainforests, and called for change.

James Meyer Sassoon, the 2007 president of the international Financial Action Task Force on Money Laundering, said that his $236 million trust revealed in the papers had been established years before by his grandmother with funds that had not been earned in the UK and therefore were not subject to tax there. He said he had first disclosed the trust when he joined the Treasury in 2002, where he was Commercial Secretary from 2010 to 2013.

An article published by the ICIJ detailing the use of ambiguous VAT policies on the Isle of Man highlights the $27 million Bombardier Challenger 605 private jet that Sir Lewis Hamilton registered there, apparently to become eligible for a $5.2 million VAT refund.

The BBC also noted questions about investments by Conservative Party donor Michael Ashcroft and Farhad Moshiri, owner of Everton Football Club.

After reporting began, Appleby sued The Guardian and the BBC on 18 December 2017 for breach of confidence as it sought copies of the documents. A confidential settlement between the three companies was reached on 4 May 2018. In a joint statement, the companies stated the vast majority of documents in the leak were not legally privileged, that the Guardian and the BBC explained to Appleby which documents were used in their reporting, and that the Guardian and the BBC had done this without compromising their journalistic integrity.

==== Ukraine ====
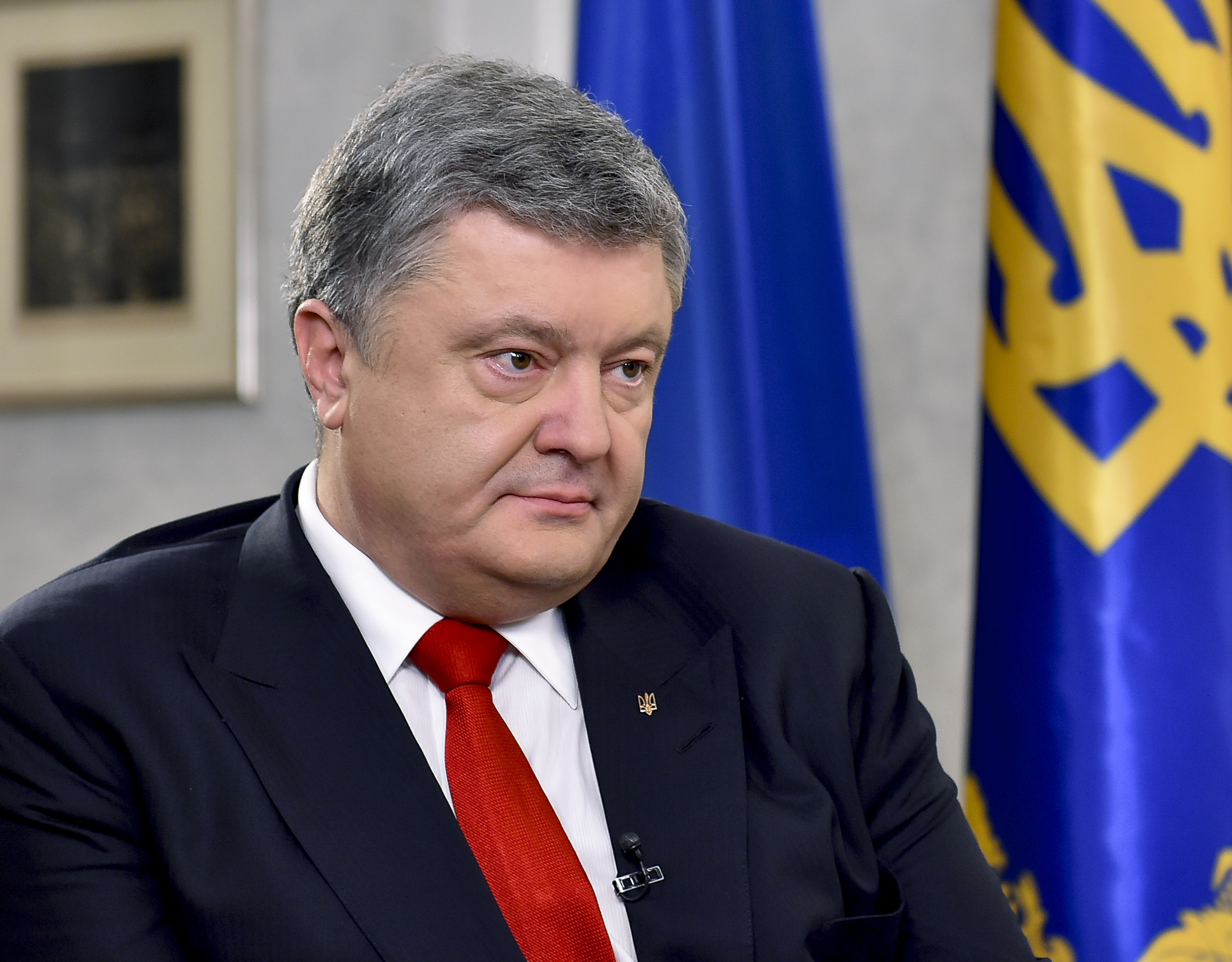
Former Ukrainian President Petro Poroshenko

Former Ukrainian president Petro Poroshenko is named in the papers.

Gennadiy Trukhanov, mayor of Odesa with Russian and Greek citizenships is named as part of a crime gang.

=== Middle East ===
==== Israel ====
Jonathan Kolber, former CEO of Koor Industries and the beneficiary of the Kolber Trust and son of former Canadian senator Leo Kolber, who set the fund up in 1991, is named.

Dan Gertler, Israeli billionaire businessman in natural resources and the founder and President of the DGI (Dan Gertler International) Group of Companies appears in 120 documents regarding his relationship with Glencore.

==== Jordan ====
Queen Noor of Jordan is listed in the papers as the beneficiary of two trusts registered in Jersey. One of the trusts, the Valentine 1997 Trust, was valued at more than $40 million in 2015, and its income is to be paid to the queen during her lifetime. The trust also owns property in southern England adjacent to Buckhurst Park, Sussex. The other trust, the Brown Discretionary Settlement, is the beneficial owner of a Jersey-incorporated investment holding company with assets worth c. $18.7 million in 2015.

==== Saudi Arabia ====
Prince Khaled bin Sultan bin Abdulaziz Al Saud, a former deputy minister of defence for the Kingdom of Saudi Arabia, is given as the owner of at least eight companies in Bermuda between 1989 and 2014, some of them apparently formed for purposes of owning yachts and airplanes.

==== Syria ====
Rami Makhlouf, reportedly Syria's wealthiest man, is listed in the papers.

=== North America ===
==== Canada ====
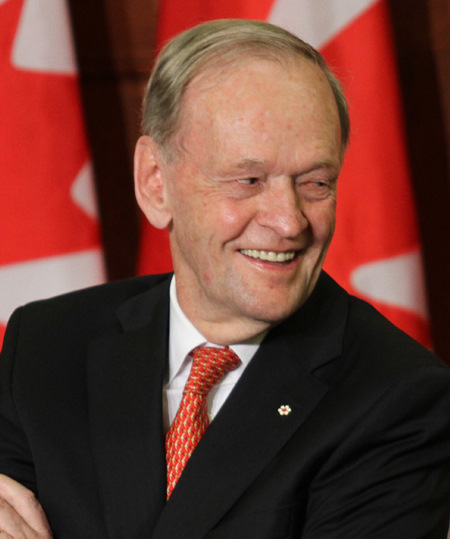
Former Prime Minister of Canada Jean Chrétien

Three former Canadian prime ministers are named in the Paradise Papers: Jean Chrétien, Paul Martin, and Brian Mulroney. According to the papers, Stephen Bronfman, Canadian prime minister Justin Trudeau's adviser and close friend, a Liberal Party fundraiser credited with putting Trudeau into office, moved millions of dollars offshore for former Liberal Party Senator Leo Kolber. The offshore manoeuvres may have avoided taxes in Canada, the United States and Israel, according to experts who reviewed some of the 3,000-plus files detailing the trust's activities.

==== Costa Rica ====
Former president José María Figueres sat on the board of energy company Energia Global International, along with his brother and Timothy Phillips. The company was bought in 2001 by Enel SpA, an Italian power company, for $73 million, plus $37 million in debt cancellation. Figueres resigned from the board that year, at the annual EF meeting in Davos. He was also CEO of the World Economic Forum from 2000 to 2004, and resigned as a result of allegations he called "unfounded" about $900,000 in consulting fees from a French telecommunications firm.

==== Mexico ====
According to the files, trade union leader and politician Joaquín Gamboa Pascoe had investments worth $15.5 million; other mentioned politicians are Pedro Aspe Armella, Alejandro Gertz Manero, and officials from PEMEX. High-profile Mexicans in the files include billionaire Carlos Slim, priest Marcial Maciel known as "the greatest fundraiser of the modern Roman Catholic church", and Ricardo Salinas Pliego. In an interview with Proceso, Alejandro Gertz Manero Attorney General of Mexico and formerly National Security Secretary, denied all knowledge of the company, of which he was vice-president, and which was started by his brother, its president.

==== United States ====
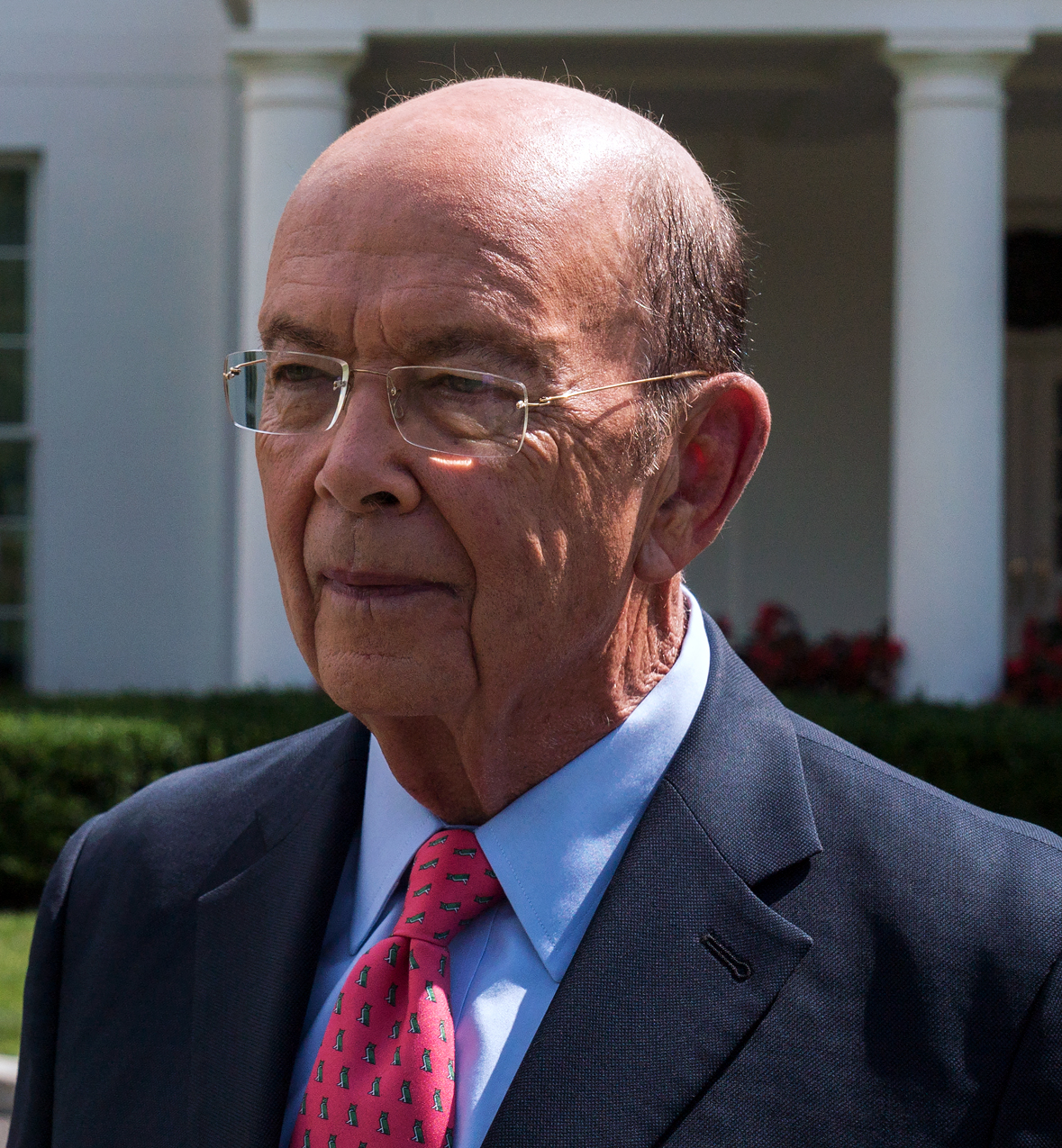
The leaked documents revealed that Secretary of Commerce Wilbur Ross holds stakes in businesses connected to sanctioned Russian oligarchs, which he did not disclose during his confirmation hearings.

According to the papers, then-United States Secretary of Commerce Wilbur Ross holds stakes in businesses which deal with Russian oligarchs Leonid Mikhelson and Gennady Timchenko, who are subject to US sanctions, as well as Russian president Vladimir Putin's former son-in-law, Kirill Shamalov. When reporters working on the Paradise Papers contacted Ross concerning his stake in Navigator Holdings, he did not deny the tie, but the day before his response became public he shorted the stock and apparently made a profit after the stock price dropped 4% after the story appeared.

Other members of the Trump administration that appear in the documents include former United States Secretary of State Rex Tillerson and former director of the National Economic Council Gary D. Cohn. Offshore ties of more than a dozen Trump advisers, Cabinet members and major donors appear in the leaked data.

Tillerson, while CEO of Exxon Yemen, was a director of a company with a joint venture agreement with a Yemeni state-owned company. He sued when Yemen ended the joint venture and turned over operations to a Yemeni company, and lost. He was still a company director and the offshore company was still active as recently as 2015.

The documents also revealed that, between 2009 and 2011, Russian state organisations with ties to Putin pursued large investments in Facebook and Twitter via an intermediary—Russian-American entrepreneur Yuri Milner, who befriended Facebook founder Mark Zuckerberg and was a business associate of Jared Kushner, President Donald Trump's son-in-law.

American singer Madonna, Microsoft co-founder Paul Allen, American billionaire George Soros, founder of Open Society Foundations, and former NATO supreme commander in Europe General Wesley Clark are also named in the papers.

This list includes some of President Donald Trump's foremost donors, who together funneled nearly $60 million to organisations supporting his campaign and transition. They include casino magnate Sheldon Adelson; resort owner Steve Wynn; hedge fund managers Robert Mercer and Paul Singer; and private equity investors Tom Barrack, Stephen Schwarzman, and Carl Icahn.

Prominent Democratic donors also appear in the law firm's files. Questions have arisen about Democratic Party donor Penny Pritzker's compliance with federal ethics rules. She had pledged to divest from more than 200 firms when she was confirmed as President Barack Obama's commerce secretary in 2013, but records show that she transferred assets to a company owned by her children's trusts, which shared the same address as her office.

The late financier and sex offender Jeffrey Epstein also figures in the Paradise Papers, as chairman from at least 2000 to 2007 of a Bermudan-registered company, Liquid Funding, Ltd., partially owned by Bear Stearns.

Economist Gabriel Zucman and his colleagues estimate that 63% of foreign profits made by American multinational corporations are stored in subsidiaries and offshore accounts, depriving the country of about $70 billion in tax revenue each year.

=== South America ===
==== Argentina ====
Argentine Finance Minister Luis Caputo managed at least two offshore wealth funds. Neither firm, the Cayman Islands–based Alto Global Fund, nor its Miami-based parent company Noctua Partners LLC, were listed in Caputo's financial disclosure statement, a statement that all public officials and candidates for office are required to make. Caputo is a first cousin of local industrialist and construction tycoon Nicolás Caputo, best friend of Argentine president Mauricio Macri. He told Argentine members of the ICIJ team that "it was an investment fund for friends and family." The funds opened in 2009 and with over $100 million under management, remained under Caputo's management until December 2015, when Macri named him Finance Secretary, a post upgraded to Finance Minister this January.

Argentine Energy Minister Juan José Aranguren managed two offshore companies, Shell Western Supply and Trading Limited and Sol Antilles y Guianas Limited, both subsidiaries of Royal Dutch Shell. One is the main bidder for the purchase of diesel oil by the current government through the state-owned CAMMESA (Compañía Administradora del Mercado Mayorista Eléctrico).

According to the papers, Argentine hotelier and real estate developer Alan Faena was director and CEO of half a dozen companies in the Cayman Islands and British Virgin Islands. Faena also appears with bank accounts in Luxembourg and the Isle of Man, linked to different hotels and real estate projects in Puerto Madero. In the offshore firms, he was associated with different investors such as Soviet-born British-American businessman Leonard Blavatnik; American billionaire J. Christopher Burch and his brother Robert Burch; American business and media executive John Augustine Hearst; and French designer Philippe Starck.

==== Brazil ====
Agriculture Minister Blairo Borges Maggi is mentioned in the papers. His company, Amaggi & LD Commodities, was first registered about five months after Maggi ended a term as governor of Mato Grosso. Maggi told Brazilian outlet Poder360 that he was not a direct beneficiary of the company and he had never received money from it.

Henrique de Campos Meirelles, the former Brazilian Minister of Finance, told Poder360 that he does not report income from his Sabedoria Foundation because it was set up to perform charitable functions after his death and therefore he receives no income from it.

==== Chile ====
Alsacia-Express, which runs the debt-ridden public transit system of Santiago, holds assets in a Bermuda bank, according to the Appleby documents.

==== Colombia ====
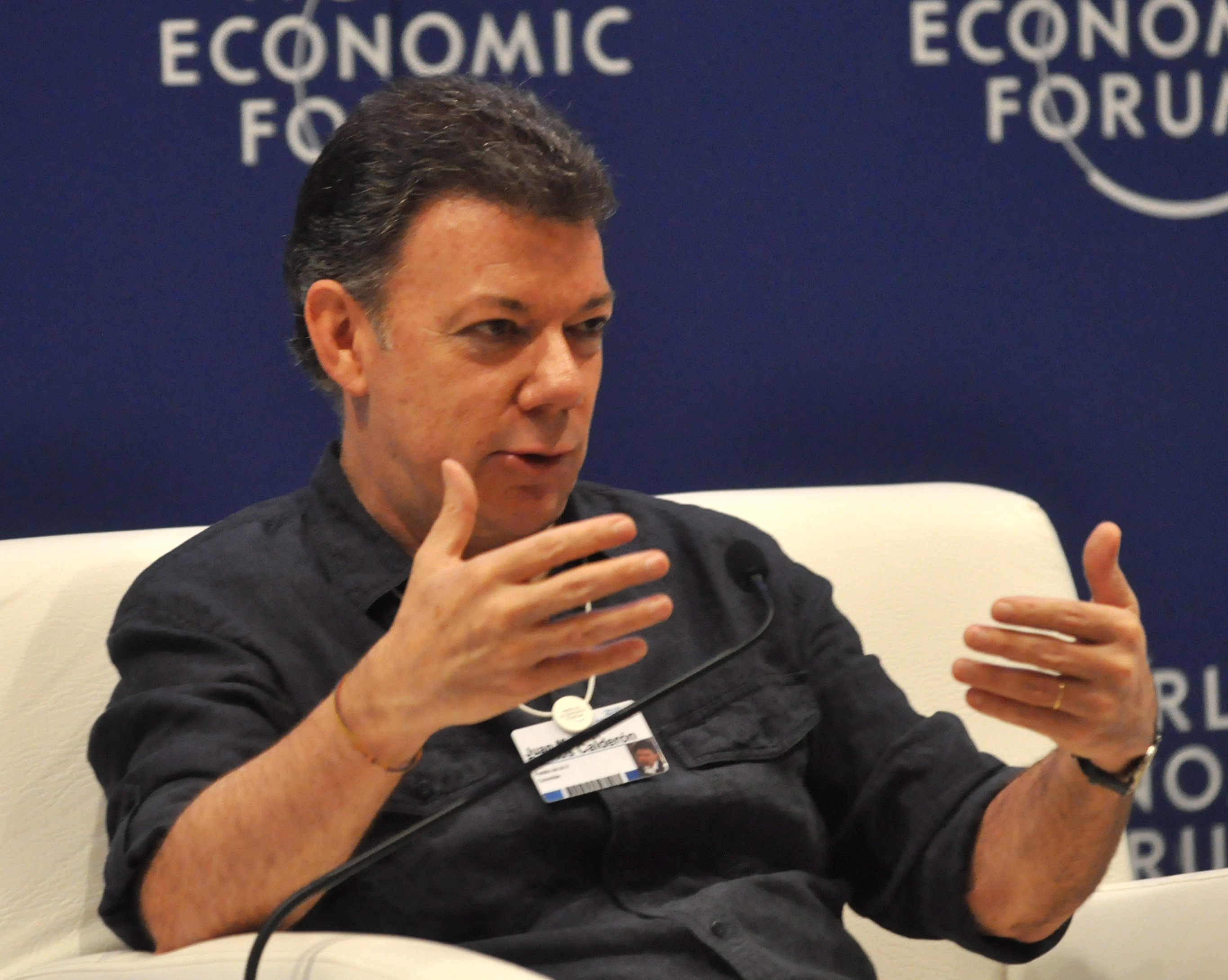
Colombian President Juan Manuel Santos

President of Colombia (2010–2018) Juan Manuel Santos is mentioned in the investigation. He was part of two offshore societies.

The singer Shakira, while living in Barcelona, is a resident of the Bahamas and sends her authors' rights revenue to Malta. In June 2019, she admitted no wrongdoing, paid $16.4 million in taxes that she owed, and in July 2021 a Spanish judge ruled that her tax-evasion case would go to trial.

== Public reaction ==
In the United Kingdom, the public reaction to the Paradise Papers has been relatively muted compared to similar leaks in the past, such as the Panama Papers. Possible reasons include the absence of overt illegality in the information; most media sources are careful to point out that the schemes in the Paradise Papers are generally lawful. A statement on behalf of Queen Elizabeth confirmed that the Royal Estate paid full UK tax on her offshore investments. Other public comments by notable popular public figures who appeared in the Papers may also play a part; Bono stated "I've been assured by those running the company that it is fully tax compliant, but if that is not the case, I want to know as much as the tax office does, and so I also welcome the audit they have said they will undertake." Jack Peat of The London Economic has suggested that much of the media has ignored the story of the Paradise Papers because those media organisations are owned by individuals implicated in the papers, such as Daily Telegraph owners David and Frederick Barclay, Daily Mail owner Jonathan Harmsworth, and The Sun and The Times owner Rupert Murdoch.

After the leak, more than 30 Members of the European Parliament issued an open letter criticising the British government for failing to take action against the offshore tax industry.

Gavin St Pier, an elected Deputy of the tax haven Guernsey, stated that the "coverage was part of a well-orchestrated, ongoing campaign". He also averred that despite having the information since 2016, the timing of the release was deliberately delayed to coincide with the meeting of EU Finance Ministers ahead of the proposed discussion of a tax haven blacklist.

Commenting on the Paradise Papers leak, United States Senator and 2016 presidential candidate Bernie Sanders warned of "rapid movement toward international oligarchy", saying, "The Paradise Papers shows how these billionaires and multinational corporations get richer by hiding their wealth and profits and avoid paying their fair share of taxes." The Democratic leader in the US Senate, Chuck Schumer, and the ranking Democratic member of the Senate finance committee, Ron Wyden, issued a joint statement accusing Republicans of "pushing a reform of the tax code that fails to close egregious loopholes revealed by the leaks."

== Litigation ==
On 18 December 2017, it was reported that Appleby had issued legal proceedings against the BBC and The Guardian for breach of confidence. The BBC and The Guardian said they would "vigorously" defend the action. Two days later Appleby released a media statement to explain the necessity to seek legal action and 2 months later provided update. The Guardian and the BBC settled the dispute with Appleby in May 2018.

In October 2018, Swiss-based multinational Glencore sought an injunction with the High Court of Australia to prevent the use of Paradise Papers documents by the Australian Taxation Office in any legal action against the mining multinational. Glencore asserted that the documents in question are subject to legal professional privilege. Glencore's writ has four plaintiffs: Glencore International AG (an intermediate holding company resident in Switzerland), Glencore Investment Pty Ltd (a company incorporated in Australia), Glencore Australia Holdings Pty Ltd (a company incorporated in Australia), and Glencore Investment Holdings Australia Ltd (a company incorporated in Bermuda). Glencore was unsuccessful in this proceeding and the court held that the ATO could use the documents.

In January 2019, Turkish journalist Pelin Ünker was sentenced to a fine and over a year in prison for publishing Paradise Papers material with regard to offshore accounts of former Turkish prime minister Binali Yıldırım and his sons.

== See also ==
- Dubai Uncovered
- Economic inequality
- Kleptocracy
- Mauritius Leaks
- Money laundering
- Offshore magic circle
- Panama Papers
- Pandora Papers
- Reginald Appleby
- Suisse secrets
- Taxation in Bermuda
