= Frederik Obermaier =

German journalist

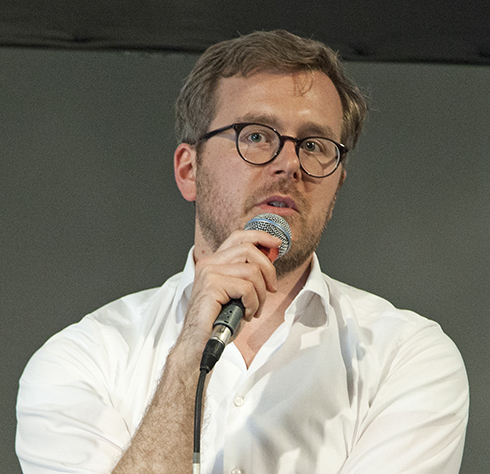
- Obermaier in 2019
- Born: 1 March 1984 (age 42); Eggenfelden, West Germany
- Occupations: investigative journalist, Süddeutsche Zeitung, International Consortium of Investigative Journalists
- Known for: Panama Papers, Bahamas Leaks, Paradise Papers
- Website: FrederikObermaier.com

Frederik Obermaier (born 1 March 1984) is a German investigative journalist, bestselling author and co-founder of the Munich-based newsroom, paper trail media, and author. Together with his colleague Bastian Obermayer in 2016 he initiated and coordinated the Panama Papers-revelations.

== Works ==
Frederik Obermaier's work focuses largely on corruption and tax-havens as well as intelligence services, illicit arms deals and extremism from the far-right to Islamist groups. Together with a group of journalists from Süddeutsche Zeitung and German public broadcaster Norddeutscher Rundfunk he uncovered Germany's role in the US drone war, especially the role of the airbase in Ramstein. Obermaier and his colleagues also revealed that the British intelligence service GCHQ had access to the communication-cables TAT-14, Atlantic Crossing 1, Circe North, Circe South, Flag Atlantic-1, Flag Europa-Asia, SeaMeWe-3 and SeaMeWe-4, Solas, UK France 3, UK Netherlands-14, Ulysses, Yellow and the Pan European Crossing.

== Panama Papers ==
To an unknown date a source who called itself John Doe leaked the documents 11.5 million internal documents created by Panamanian law firm and corporate service provider Mossack Fonseca to Obermaier and his colleague Bastian Obermayer. "My life is in danger", he told them. In a 6 May statement, John Doe cited income inequality, and said he leaked the documents "simply because I understood enough about their contents to realise the scale of the injustices they described". He added that he has never worked for any government or intelligence agency and expressed willingness to help prosecutors. The two journalist shared the documents with the International Consortium of Investigative Journalists (ICIJ). Journalists from 107 media organizations in 80 countries analyzed documents detailing the operations of the law firm. After more than a year of analysis, the first news stories were published on 3 April 2016.

Obermaier and Obermayer in April 2016 also published the best selling book "Panama Papers" about their experiences with John Doe and the following worldwide revelations. It was translated to more than ten languages. In 2016 Netflix acquired the exclusive film rights to the book.

== Bahamas Leaks ==
After Panama Papers an unknown source handed over internal data from the national corporate registry of the Bahamas to Frederik Obermaier and Bastian Obermayer. The 38 gigabyte of data show that several current and former heads of state and government and high-ranking politicians, including former EU Commissioner Neelie Kroes; Colombia's former mining minister Carlos Caballero Argáez; Hamad bin Jassim bin Jaber Al Thani, the former prime minister of Qatar; and Angola's vice-president, Manuel Domingos Vicente were respectively are directors, secretaries, or presidents of Bahamian companies.

== Paradise Papers ==
Frederik Obermaier and his colleague Bastian Obermayer also initiated the Paradise Papers, which were published on 5 November 2017. The trove of 13,5 million records revealed ties between Russia and U.S. President Donald Trump's billionaire commerce secretary Wilbur Ross, the hidden fortune of Canadian prime minister Justin Trudeau's chief fundraiser Stephen Bronfman and the offshore dealings of Queen Elizabeth II. It also revealed a company that were managed by Tommy and Mamiek Suharto, and Prabowo Subianto as director of a company in debt arrears which resulted in its closure in 2004.

== Ibiza affair ==
Frederik Obermaier was part of a joint investigative effort of Süddeutsche Zeitung and Der Spiegel which, in May 2019, revealed that Austria's Vice Chancellor Heinz-Christian Strache of the far-right Freedom Party had – during a vacation on Ibiza in July 2017 – promised government contracts to a woman claiming to be a Russian millionaire. Strache resigned over the revelation; Chancellor Sebastian Kurz called for a snap election.

== Suisse Secrets ==
After an anonymous source leaked data about thousands of customers of the Swiss Bank Credit Suisse to Frederik Obermaier and Bastian Obermayer they – together with OCCRP – launched the Suisse Secrets project: an investigation about the dubious customers of Credit Suisse. The leaked data revealed the beneficiaries of more than 100bn Swiss francs held at Credit Suisse – among them: a human trafficker in the Philippines, a Hong Kong stock exchange boss jailed for bribery, an Egypt murderer and executives who looted Venezuela's state oil company, as well as corrupt politicians from Egypt to Ukraine. Several accounts were held by the heads of intelligence agencies or their relatives including figures who worked closely with the Central Intelligence Agency and some who have been accused of overseeing torture and other human rights abuses.

== Awards and honours ==
Obermaier has received numerous awards, among others the CNN-Award in 2011, the Wächterpreis der Tagespresse, the European Press Prize in 2025 and the Helmut Schmidt Prize in 2013.

As part of the Panama Papers-team he won – among others – the George Polk award, the Perfil award and Germany's most prestigious journalism prize, the Nannen Prize. He was voted, together with his colleagues Bastian Obermayer and Vanessa Wormer, "German Journalist of the Year 2016". As part of ICIJ's Panama Papers team he won the Pulitzer Prize 2017 in the category "Explanatory Reporting".

In 2017 Frederik Obermaier was awarded the renowned Nieman Fellowship at the University of Harvard.

== Publications ==
- Country on the brink – state collapse and the threat of war in the Republic of Yemen
- Kapuzenmänner – The Ku Klux Klan in Germany
- Panama Papers – Breaking the Story of How the Rich and Powerful Hide Their Money
- Suisse Secrets – How bankers hid the money of tax evaders, torture generals, dictators and the Catholic Church – with the help of politicians
