= Bastian Obermayer =

German investigative journalist (born 1977)

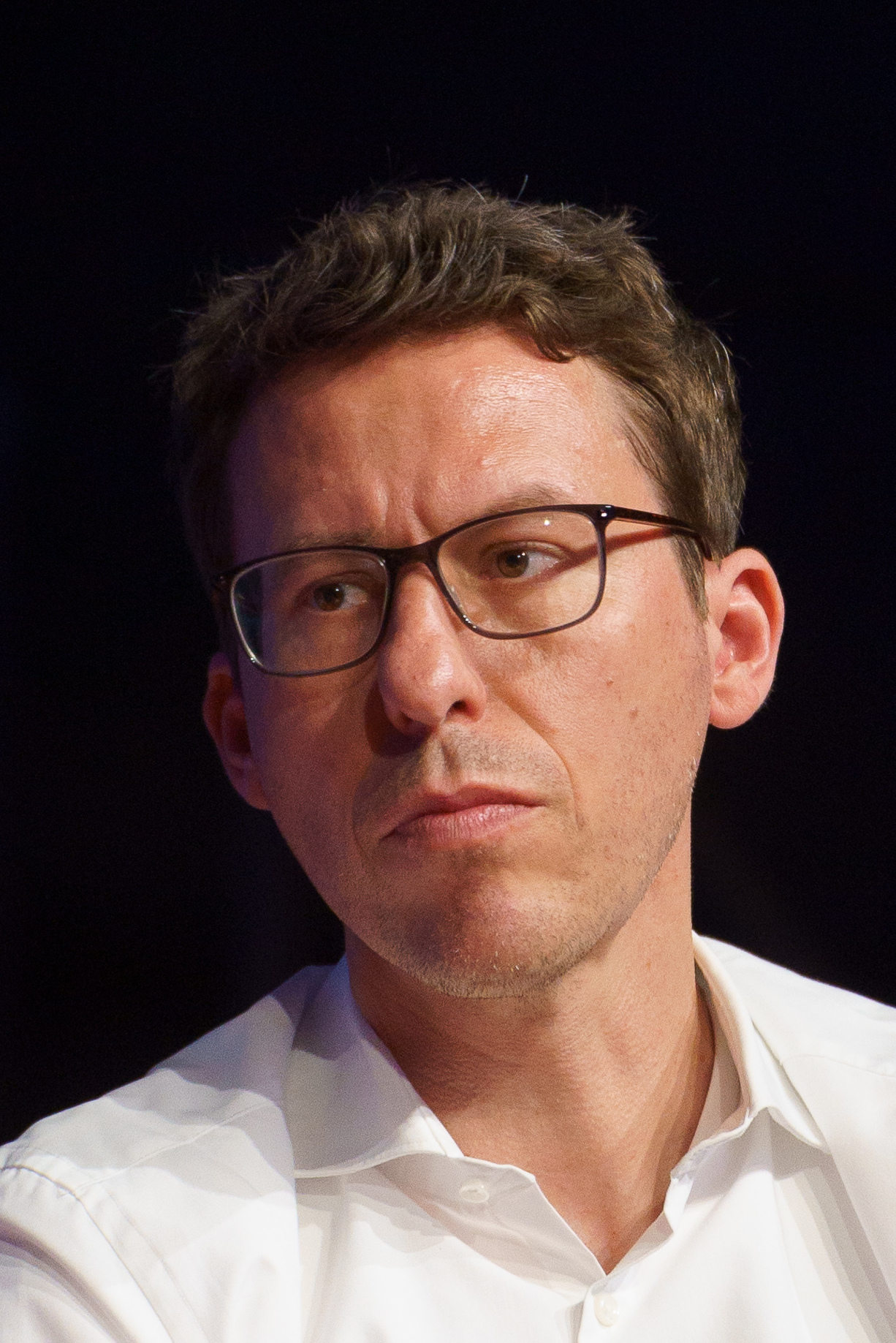
- Obermayer in 2024
- Born: 10 December 1977 (age 48); Rosenheim, West Germany
- Education: LMU Munich; Deutsche Journalistenschule
- Occupations: Investigative journalist, Süddeutsche Zeitung
- Known for: Panama Papers; Paradise Papers; The Daphne Project

Bastian Obermayer (born 10 December 1977) is a Pulitzer Prize-winning German investigative journalist with the Munich-based newspaper Süddeutsche Zeitung (SZ) and the reporter who received the Panama Papers from an anonymous source as well as later on the Paradise Papers, together with his colleague Frederik Obermaier. Obermayer is also author of several books, among them the best selling account of the Panama Papers: The Panama Papers: Breaking the Story of How the Rich and Powerful Hide Their Money, co-authored by his colleague Frederik Obermaier.

After the Knight-Wallace Fellowship in Ann Arbor, Michigan, Obermayer, in 2017, helped found the investigative non-profit newsroom Forbidden Stories and co-initiated with founder Laurent Richard the first project: The Daphne Project, dedicated to the killed Maltese journalist Daphne Caruana Galizia. Obermayer serves currently as Vice President of Forbidden Stories.

Obermayer studied politics, history, and American studies at LMU Munich as well as journalism at the Deutsche Journalistenschule in Munich.

== Works ==
Obermayer works on a wide range of topics. He revealed a large scandal inside the German automotive club ADAC, which led to a complete restructuring of the biggest German club, but his work has also included reporting on sexual abuse by priests, illicit arms deals, Nazi criminals, intelligence services and, mainly in the last years, corruption and tax havens. As a member of the International Consortium of Investigative Journalists (ICIJ), Obermayer also took part in the large collaborative investigations Offshore Leaks, Luxembourg Leaks and Swiss Leaks. Together with a group of journalists from Süddeutsche Zeitung and German public broadcaster Norddeutscher Rundfunk he uncovered Germany's role in the US drone war, especially the role of the airbase in Ramstein.

== Panama Papers ==
Obermayer was contacted at an uncertain time by an anonymous whistleblower who called themself John Doe and who thenceforth leaked more than 11.5 million internal documents created by Panamanian law firm and corporate service provider Mossack Fonseca to Obermayer and his colleague Frederik Obermaier. "My life is in danger", John Doe told Obermayer. In a 6 May 2016 statement, John Doe cited income inequality, and said he leaked the documents "simply because I understood enough about their contents to realise the scale of the injustices they described". He added that he has never worked for any government or intelligence agency and expressed willingness to help prosecutors. The journalist shared the documents with the International Consortium of Investigative Journalists. Journalists from 107 media organizations in 80 countries analyzed documents detailing the operations of the law firm. After more than a year of analysis, the first news stories were published on 3 April 2016. Only days later, Obermayer and Frederik Obermaier published their book, titled Panama Papers: Breaking the Story of How the Rich and Powerful Hide Their Money, first in German and later in more than 15 languages. The US investigative journalist Bob Woodward called the Panama Papers investigation a "triumph of journalism", the NSA whistleblower Edward Snowden "the biggest leak in the history of journalism". Later on Netflix announced to turn the investigation into a movie based on the book of Obermayer and Obermaier.

== Bahamas-Leaks ==
After the Panama Papers were leaked, an unknown source handed over internal data from the national corporate registry of the Bahamas to Obermayer and Obermaier. The 38 gigabytes of data show that several current and former heads of state and government and high-ranking politicians, including former EU Commissioner Neelie Kroes; Colombia's former mining minister Carlos Caballero Argáez; Hamad bin Jassim bin Jaber al-Thani, the former prime minister of Qatar; and Angola's vice-president, Manuel Domingos Vicente were directors, secretaries, or presidents of Bahamian companies.

== Paradise Papers ==
Obermayer and Obermaier also initiated the Paradise Papers, which were published on 5 November 2017. The trove of 13.5 million records revealed ties between Russia and U.S. President Donald Trump's billionaire commerce secretary Wilbur Ross, the hidden fortune of Canadian prime minister Justin Trudeau's chief fundraiser Stephen Bronfman and the offshore dealings of Queen Elizabeth II.

== Daphne Project ==
In fall of 2016 Obermayer met the French investigative reporter Laurent Richard in Ann Arbor, Michigan, where both spent ten months as Knight-Wallace Fellows. Richard had come to Ann Arbor with the idea of founding an investigative non-profit newsroom dedicated to defeating censorship through collaborative journalism – a field in which Obermayer had useful knowledge to offer, after having started the Panama Papers. When Richard later in mid 2017 founded the organization, which he named Freedom Voices Network, he asked Obermayer to serve as Vice President. On the very day in October 2017 the Maltese investigative journalist Daphne Caruana Galizia was killed, Richard and Obermayer decided to try to continue her work collaboratively – and so the Daphne Project emerged.

== Awards and honours ==
Obermayer has received numerous German journalism awards, including the Theodor Wolff Prize in 2009, the Henri Nannen Prize in 2010 and 2017, the Helmut Schmidt Prize in 2013, 2014 and 2016, and the Deutscher Reporterpreis in 2016. He was voted, together with his colleagues Frederik Obermayer and Vanessa Wormer, "German Journalist of the Year 2016" as well as "German Business Journalist of the Year" 2014.

He has also won international and US awards, such as the George Polk award, the Barlett & Steele award, the Perfil award and also, as part of ICIJ's Panama Papers team, the Pulitzer Prize 2017 in the category "Explanatory Reporting".

In 2016 Obermayer was awarded the prestigious Knight Wallace Fellowship of the University of Michigan.

== Publications ==
- Obermayer, Bastian (2014). Gott ist gelb wie der ADAC Deutschland belügt [God is Yellow] (in German). Reinbek bei Hamburg: Rowohlt-Taschenbuch-Verl. ISBN 978-3-499-62911-2. OCLC 878164359.
- Obermayer, Bastian; Stadler, Rainer (2011). Bruder, was hast du getan? Kloster Ettal; die Täter, die Opfer, das System [Brother, What Have You Done?] (in German). Köln: Kiepenheuer & Witsch. ISBN 978-3-462-04340-2. OCLC 725270631.
- Baumann, Marc; Much, Mauritius; Obermayer, Bastian; Langeder, Martin; Storz, Franziska (2011). Feldpost Briefe deutscher Soldaten aus Afghanistan [Letters From the Front] (in German). Reinbek bei Hamburg: Rowohlt, Reinbek bei Hamburg. ISBN 978-3-498-00670-9. OCLC 702646714.
- Obermayer, Bastian; Obermaier, Frederik (2017). The Panama papers : breaking the story of how the rich and powerful hide their money. London: Oneworld. ISBN 978-1-78607-070-8. OCLC 993411455.
