= State of the State report =

PDF version of the report

The State of the State (Spanish: El estado del estado) is a 2016 report released in Argentina, during the presidency of Mauricio Macri. It details the conditions of the state as of December 10, 2015, after the presidencies of Néstor Kirchner and Cristina Fernández de Kirchner. This report was announced on March 1, 2016, by president Macri, during the Opening of regular sessions of the National Congress of Argentina.

== Contents ==
The contents of the report have been divided in 219 items.

The Ministry of Social Development was received with a debt of $500,000,000, and $13,544,000 from the budget for social houses was destined to unrelated purposes. A third of all the houses built by it did not meet the minimal standards, and 60% of the families benefited with them did not receive the property title.

The state had a debt over $3,000,000,000 with national universities, and teachers at seven provinces were paid below the minimum wage. The Posadas hospital had used only 25% of the 2015 budget for infrastructure improvements, and 400,000 deceased retirees were still receiving benefits at PAMI.

The country had a recession since 2012, and industrial activity decreased all months from 2013 to 2015. Exports fell by 25%, and the fiscal deficit was %5,5 of the whole economy. No jobs in the private sector had been created since 2012. 18,000 jobs in the food industry were lost, and the country fell from being the 3º international provider of meats to the 12º. 4,000,000 of workers in the private sector were not fully legally employed, and 51% of the people in the country had employment problems.

Ephedrine imports grew over 100% in a few years, and statistics about crime in Argentina ceased to be published in 2008. There were more than 700 denounces of corruption crimes, and the Ezeiza prison had debts for $800,000,000.
