= Höllengebirge =

Mountain range in the Northern Limestone Alps in Upper Austria

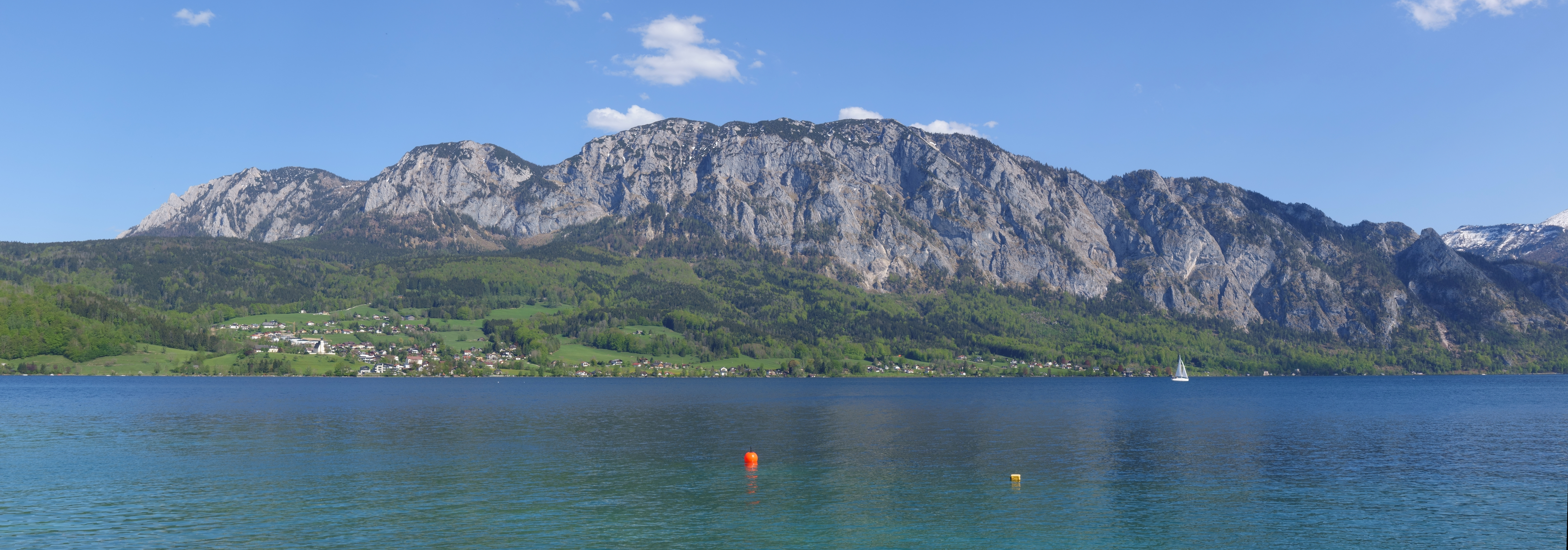
- Western view of the Höllengebirge (view from Unterach am Attersee)

Highest point
- Peak: Großer Höllkogel
- Elevation: 1,862 m (6,109 ft)
- Coordinates: 47°48′34″N 13°39′08″E

Dimensions
- Area: 126.8 km^{2} (49.0 mi^{2})

Geography
- Location within Alps
- Country: Austria
- State: Upper Austria
- Parent range: Salzkammergut Mountains

Geology
- Rock type(s): Fold mountain, limestone karst massif

The Höllengebirge is a mountain range in the Upper Austrian part of the Salzkammergut and is part of the Northern Limestone Alps. The high plateau, which averages 1,600 m (5,200 ft) in elevation, reaches its highest point at the Großer Höllkogel with 1,862 m (6,109 ft). The heavily karstified mountain consists primarily of Wetterstein limestone and drains mostly underground. The Höllengebirge is developed for tourism with mountain huts and an extensive network of trails. There are ski areas at the Feuerkogel and near the Taferlklaussee. The Feuerkogel is accessible year-round via the Feuerkogelseilbahn from Ebensee am Traunsee. Forests are present only on the flanks of the mountain. The plateau itself is covered with extensive stands of mountain pine (Pinus mugo). The Höllengebirge is owned by the Austrian Federal Forests. The name derives from the cirque "In der Höll" on the south side of the mountain.

== Geography ==
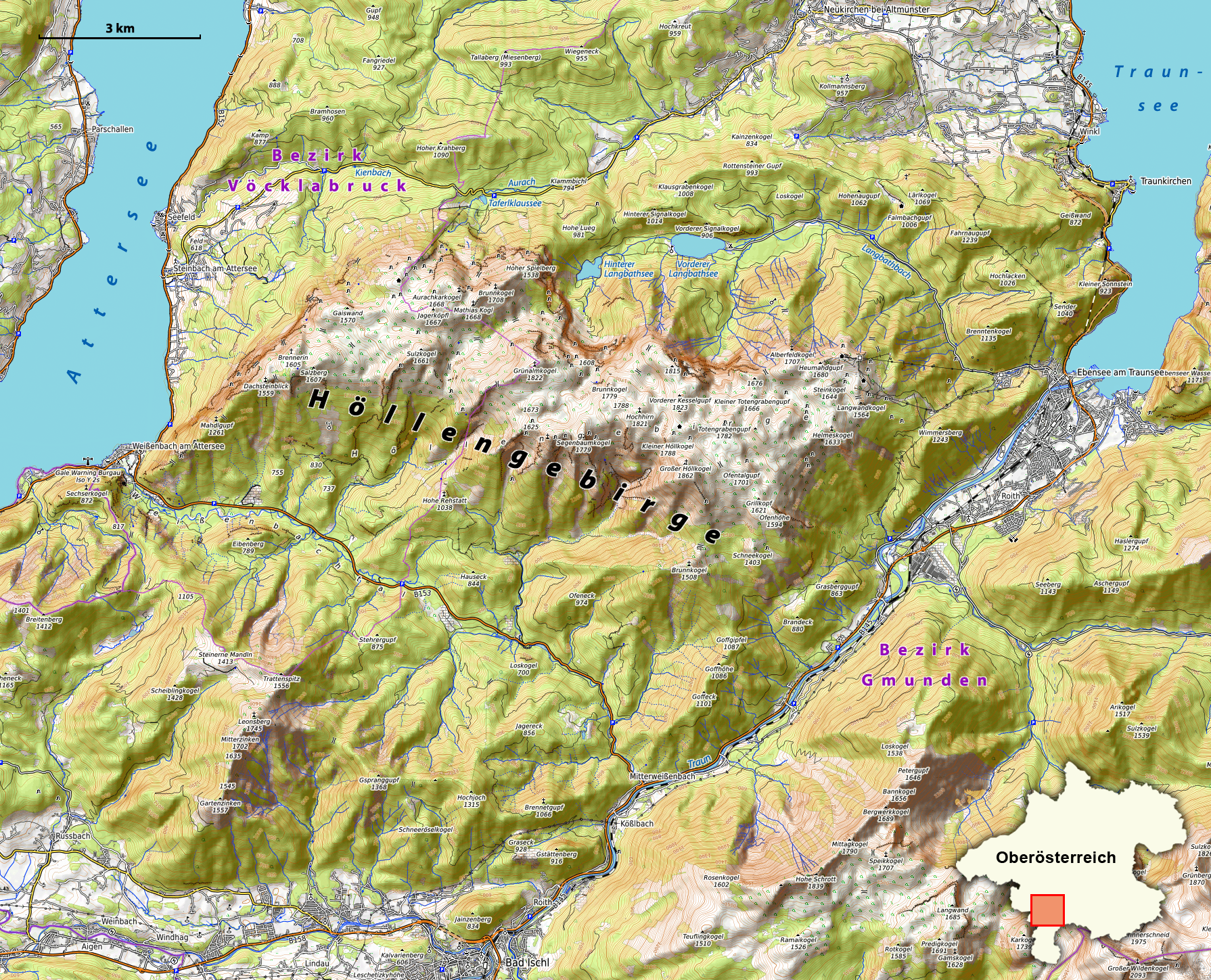
Topographic map of the Höllengebirge

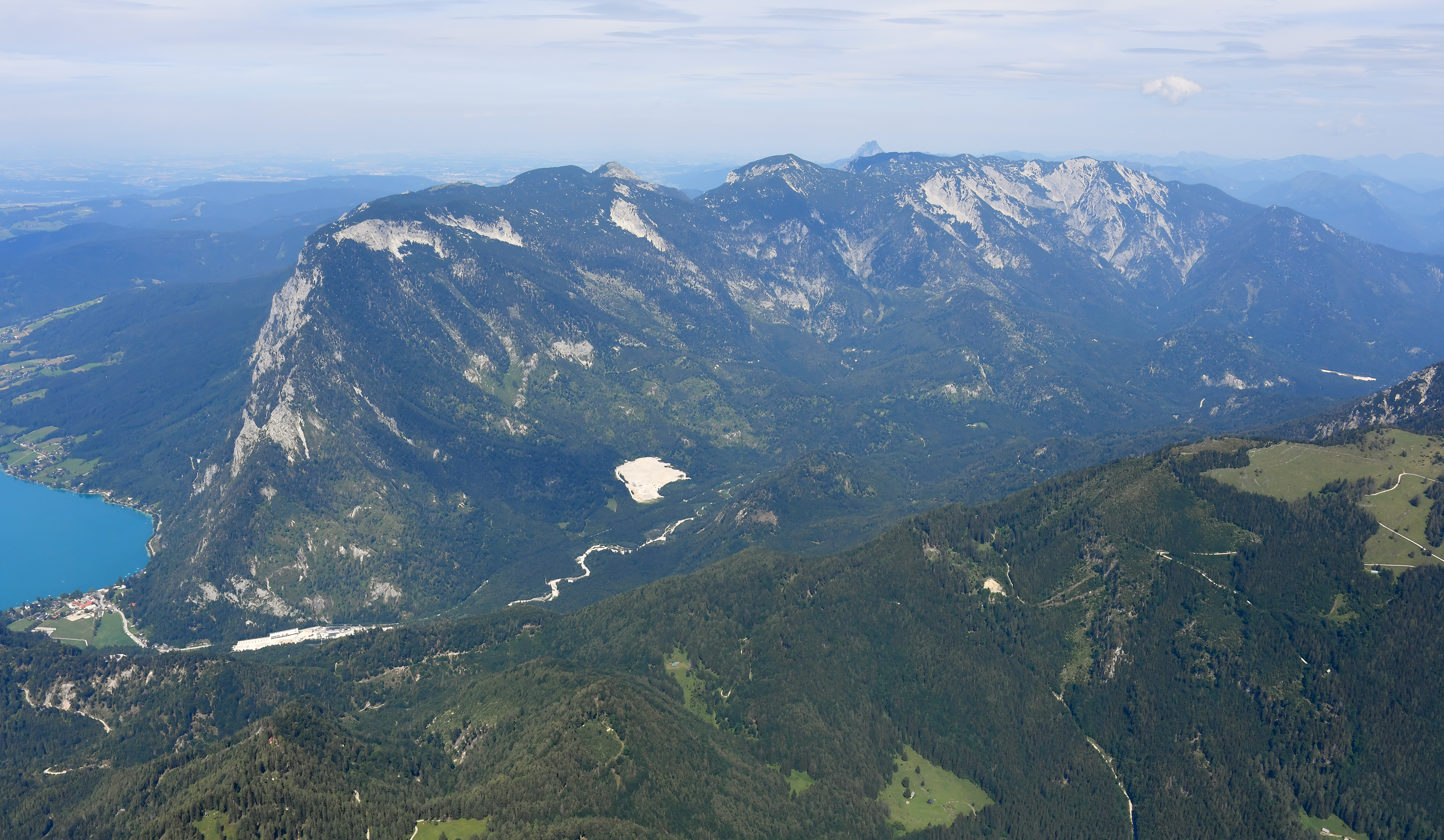
The south side of the Höllengebirge seen from the southwest from the air

The Höllengebirge has a maximum extent of 17 km from the Attersee in the west to the Traunsee in the east and 11 km from north to south; it covers a total area of 126.8 km². The northern boundary is formed by the Kienbach, which flows from the Krahbergtaferl saddle to the Attersee, and the upper course of the Aurach from the Taferlklaussee to the Großalm. The boundary runs up to the 830 m (2,720 ft) high Lueg saddle, down to the Hinterer Langbathsee, and along the Langbathbach to its mouth in the Traunsee in Ebensee. In the southeast, the area between Ebensee and Mitterweißenbach is bounded by the Traun. The southwestern boundary between Mitterweißenbach and Weißenbach am Attersee is the Weißenbachtal. The boundary is closed along the Attersee shore between Weißenbach and Seefeld. Administratively, the Höllengebirge lies in the Vöcklabruck District (west), part of the Hausruckviertel, and the Gmunden District (east), part of the Traunviertel. Historically, the entire Höllengebirge belonged to the Hausruckviertel, which at that time extended to the Traun, but today the boundary between Hausruckviertel and Traunviertel follows the district boundary and runs from the Krahbergtaferl to the Hochleckenhaus, over the Grünalmkogel and to the Hohe Rehstatt to the Weißenbacher Straße in the south. The following municipalities in the Gmunden District have shares in the Höllengebirge: the town of Bad Ischl with part of the cadastral municipality of Jainzen, the market town of Ebensee with the cadastral municipality of Langwies and parts of the cadastral municipality of Oberlangbath, and the market town of Altmünster with parts of the cadastral municipality of Neukirchen. In the Vöcklabruck District, the Höllengebirge extends over most of the municipality of Steinbach am Attersee.

=== Transport ===
In the north, the Großalm Straße L544 runs from Steinbach am Attersee to Neukirchen near Altmünster. Its highest point is at the Taferlhöhe 829 m (2,720 ft), near the Taferlklaussee. In the east, the Langbath Straße L1297 leads from Ebensee to the Vorderer Langbathsee. Along the Traun in the east runs the Salzkammergutstraße. In the south, the Weißenbacher Straße runs through the Weißenbachtal. It starts at the Salzkammergutstraße and ends in Weißenbach am Attersee in the west. Along the eastern shore of the Attersee is the Seeleiten Straße. The Feuerkogelseilbahn is an aerial tramway and leads from Ebensee to the Feuerkogel. From the Ebensee district of Langwies, a gravel road leads to the Feuerkogel from the southeast. It is closed to public traffic, but cycling is permitted.

=== Topography ===
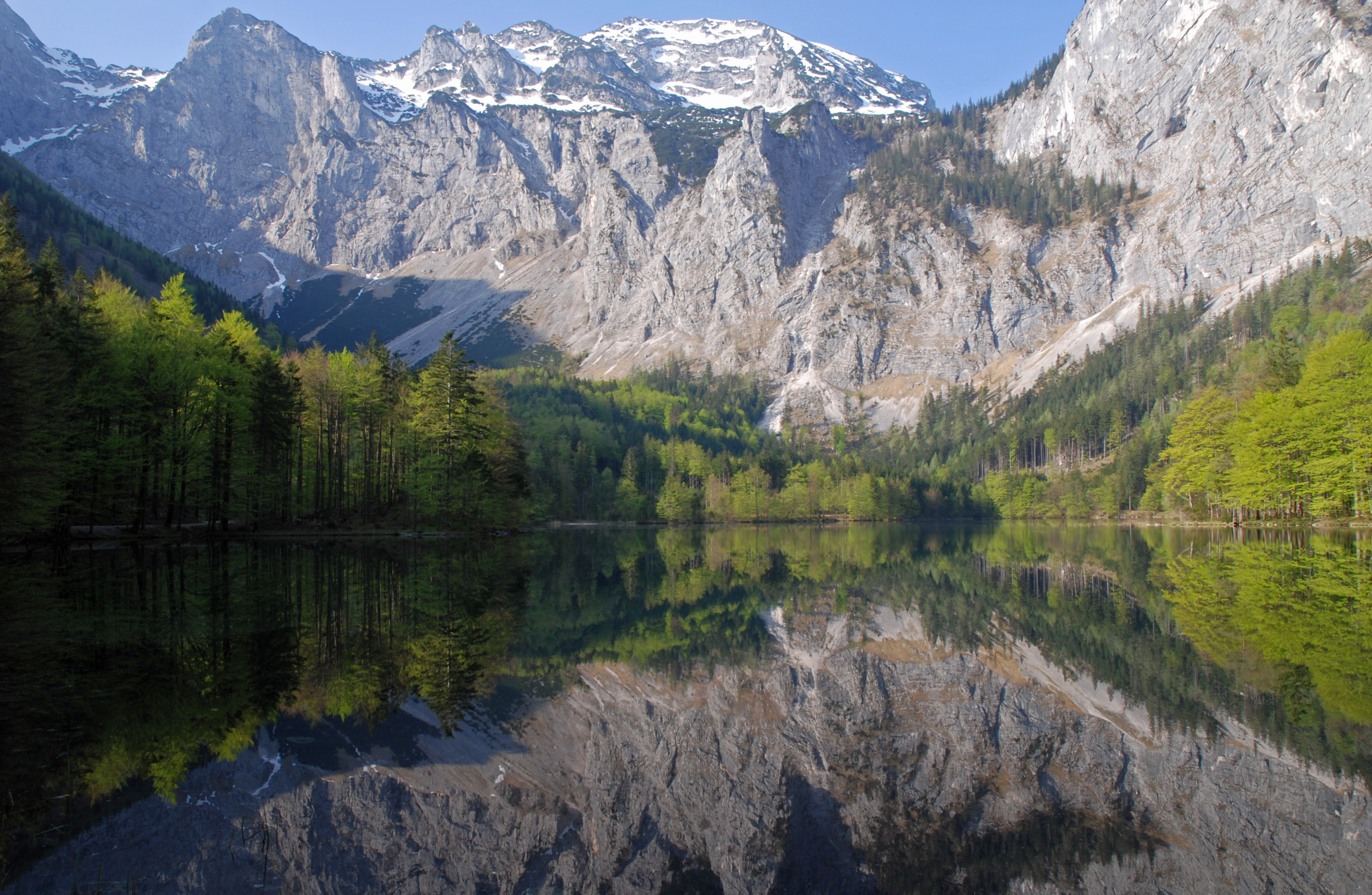
The east walls of the Hoher Spielberg drop steeply to the Hinterer Langbathsee

The Höllengebirge is a plateau mountain with an average elevation of 1,600 m (5,200 ft). The high plateau is furrowed by ravines and pits and dotted with sinkholes. The depression of the Pfaffengraben, which partly lies below 1,300 m (4,300 ft), divides the high plateau into the smaller western and larger eastern Höllengebirge. The Höllengebirge reaches its highest point at the Großer Höllkogel with 1,862 m (6,109 ft). The northern escarpments are very steep, rocky, and partly feature bizarre rock towers such as the Adlerspitze and the Steinerne Männer. They begin at the Attersee and reach wall heights of 600 m at the Madlschneid. The walls are interrupted by flatter sections, such as the Brennerriese, the Bleggagraben, and the Langer Graben. At the eastern and western ends, the rock walls become steeper and more inaccessible. The 600 m high Gamswand of the Hoher Spielberg forms the end of the Langbathtal. The southern slopes are less exposed. The mountain rises to the high plateau in steep slopes and slab shoots. Characteristic of the middle part of the southern slopes are the avalanche chutes Brunnlahngang, Klauslahngang, and Hasellahngang. The eponymous cirque In der Höll is also located on the southern slopes.

=== Summits ===
Selected summits of the Höllengebirge accessible via marked trails:

Western Höllengebirge
Summit	Elevation (m)
Grünalmkogel	1821
Brunnkogel	1708
Hochleckenkogel	1691
Brennerin	1602
Dachsteinblick	1559
Schoberstein	1037

Eastern Höllengebirge
Summit	Elevation (m)
Großer Höllkogel	1862
Hochhirn	1821
Vorderer Kesselgupf	1822
Eiblgupf	1813
Helmeskogel	1633
Feuerkogel	1592

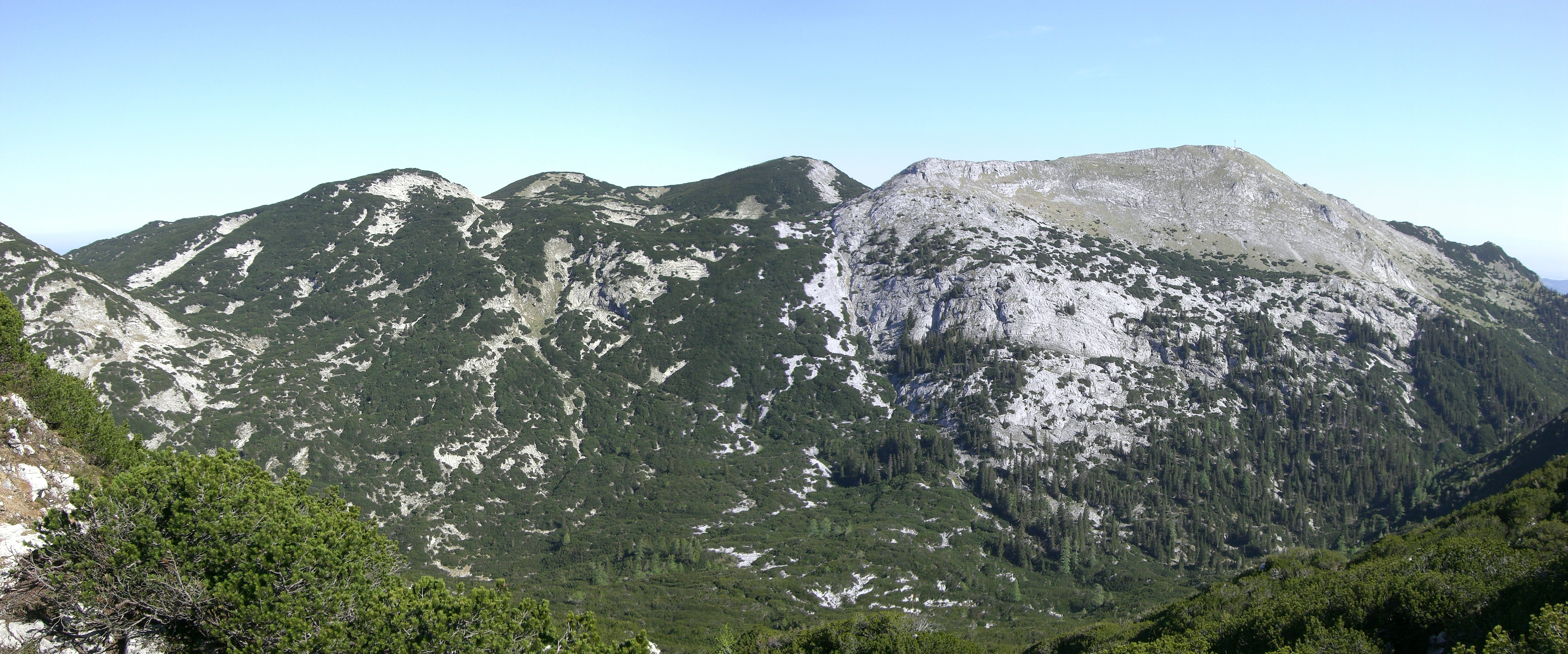
View from the Grünalmkogel over the western plateau.
From left to right: Jagaköpfl, Aurachkarkogel, Hochleckenkogel, Mathiaskogel, and Brunnkogel, as well as the Hoher Spielberg on the far right.
In the lower third of the image is the Pfaffengraben.

=== Waters ===
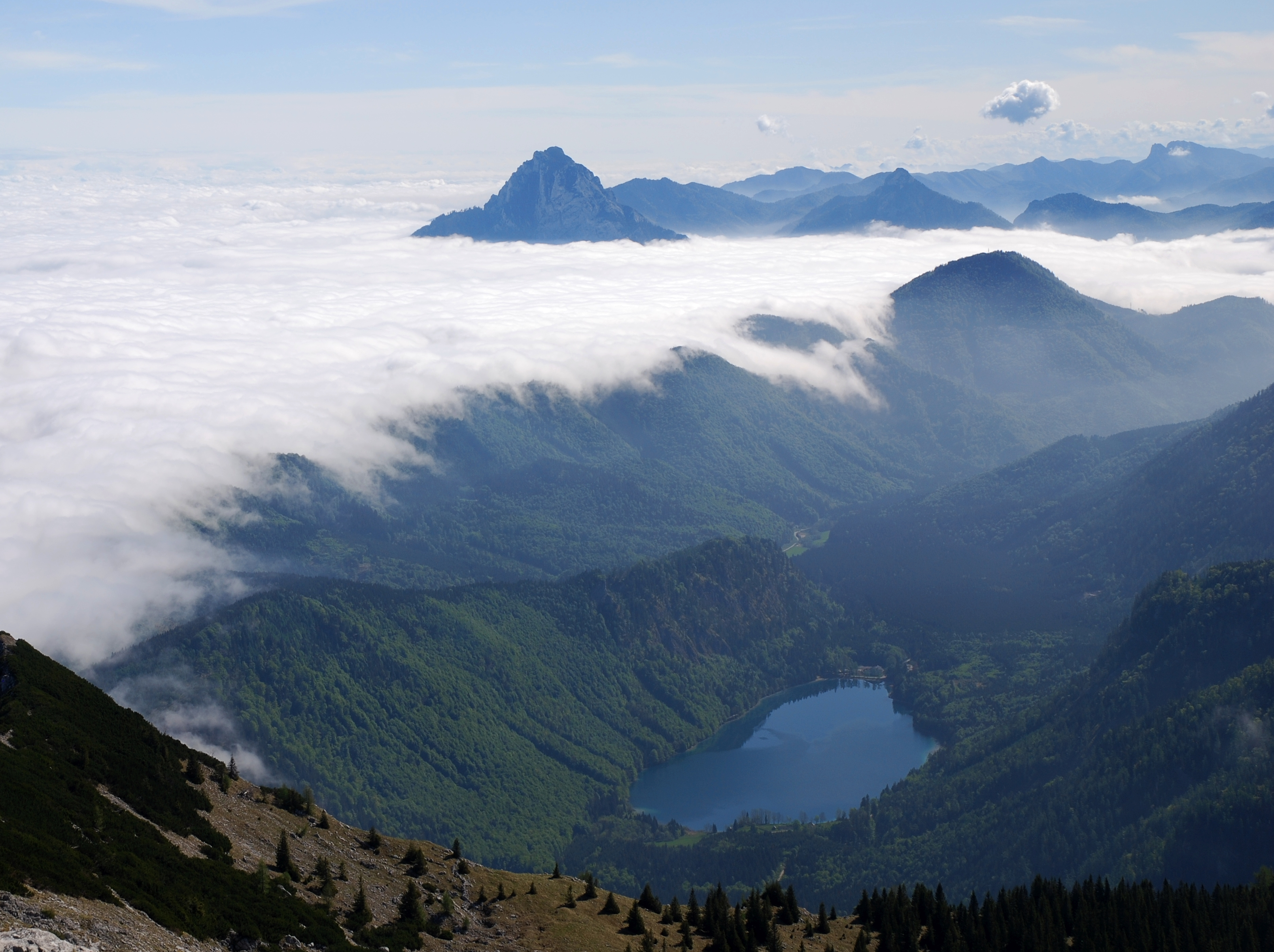
View from the Brunnkogel to the Vorderer Langbathsee

Around the Höllengebirge there are numerous streams that mostly originate at the foot of the mountain. The general watershed runs from the Taferlhöhe over the Hochleckenkogel to the Sulzberg and over the Hohe Rehstatt to the Jagdhaus Umkehrstube in the Weißenbachtal. The streams flowing to the Attersee collect in the Kienbach and the Äußerer Weißenbach. The most important tributaries are the Zwieselbach in the north and the Gimbach in the south. The Aurach originates at the end of the Langer Graben and shortly thereafter forms the Taferlklaussee. The Hinterer Langbathsee and the Vorderer Langbathsee collect water from the northeastern part of the mountain. Only a few smaller streams from the Spitzalm area flow directly to the Traun. The Mitterweißenbach carries the waters from the south of the mountain to the Traun and has the Höllbach and the Wambach as its largest tributaries.

== Geology ==
=== Tectonics ===
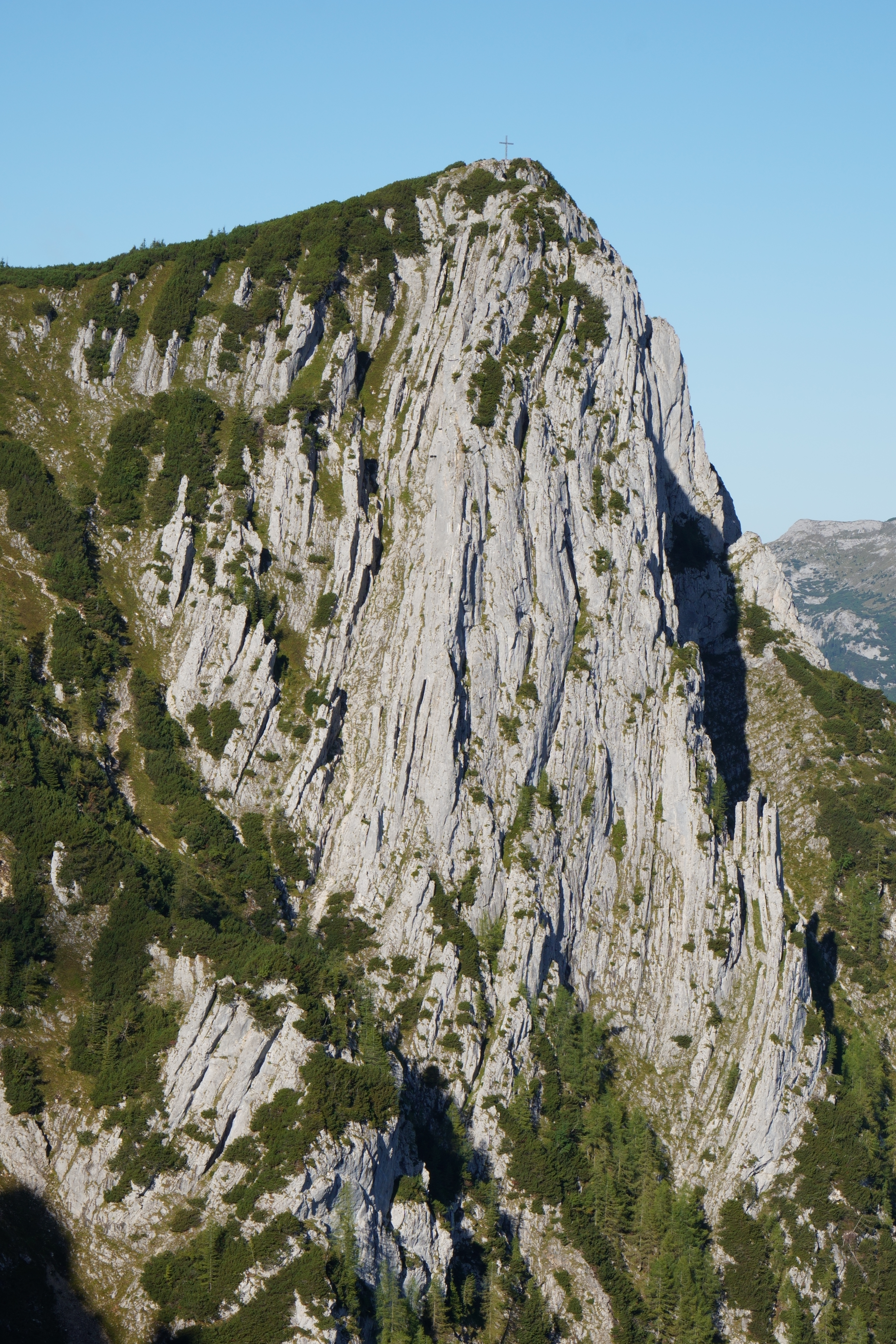
Vertically standing Wetterstein limestone of the Alberfeldkogel at the front of the Höllengebirge nappe

Tectonically, the Höllengebirge is a massive, northward-dipping (north-vergent) domed fold (anticline) of the Staufen-Höllengebirge nappe, belonging to the Tyrolean nappe unit (Tyrolicum), where in the south the hanging wall limb rises at an angle of 25 to 35 degrees and gradually turns into a vertical to slightly overturned bedding toward the northern edge of the Höllengebirge. Beneath the Höllengebirge nappe lies the Langbath zone (Bavarian nappe), which reaches its greatest width of about four kilometers north-south in the area of the Vorderer Langbathsee. In the middle Cretaceous about 80 million years ago, the first folding of the mountain occurred, after which it was flooded again by the Gosau Sea. In the Tertiary, the Höllengebirge was uplifted again together with the Alps and shifted northward. This completed the nappe formation to date. During the overriding of the Höllengebirge nappe, the underlying Langbath zone was also deformed, so that it also dips slightly northward at the front of the Höllengebirge nappe.

=== Lithostratigraphy ===
In its central part, the Höllengebirge nappe consists almost exclusively of Wetterstein limestone, which was formed from the Anisian to the early Carnian of the Triassic about 247 to 235 million years ago. In the south, east to the Wambachtal, Wetterstein dolomite forms the base of the mountain. It formed during the same epoch but has a higher magnesium content. The thickness of the Wetterstein limestone is 1000 to 1200 m in the west and just under 1000 m in the east. In the southeast, the stratigraphically higher, thus younger Hauptdolomit forms the frame of the mountain. Between them are layers of the Lunz Formation tens of meters thick, forming the separation horizon between the Wetterstein dolomite and the Hauptdolomit. The Lunz Formation is accompanied by the Opponitz Formation. The Langbath zone is separated from the Höllengebirge nappe by a narrow band of Lunz layers. It consists predominantly of Hauptdolomit and overlying platy limestone (Norian), above which in east-west oriented basins follow sediments of the Kössen Formation (Rhaetian) and the Schrambach Formation (Lower Cretaceous). These consist mainly of marl, radiolarite, sandstone, conglomerate, and breccia.

Simplified geological profile through the Höllengebirge (exaggerated)

=== Former glaciation ===
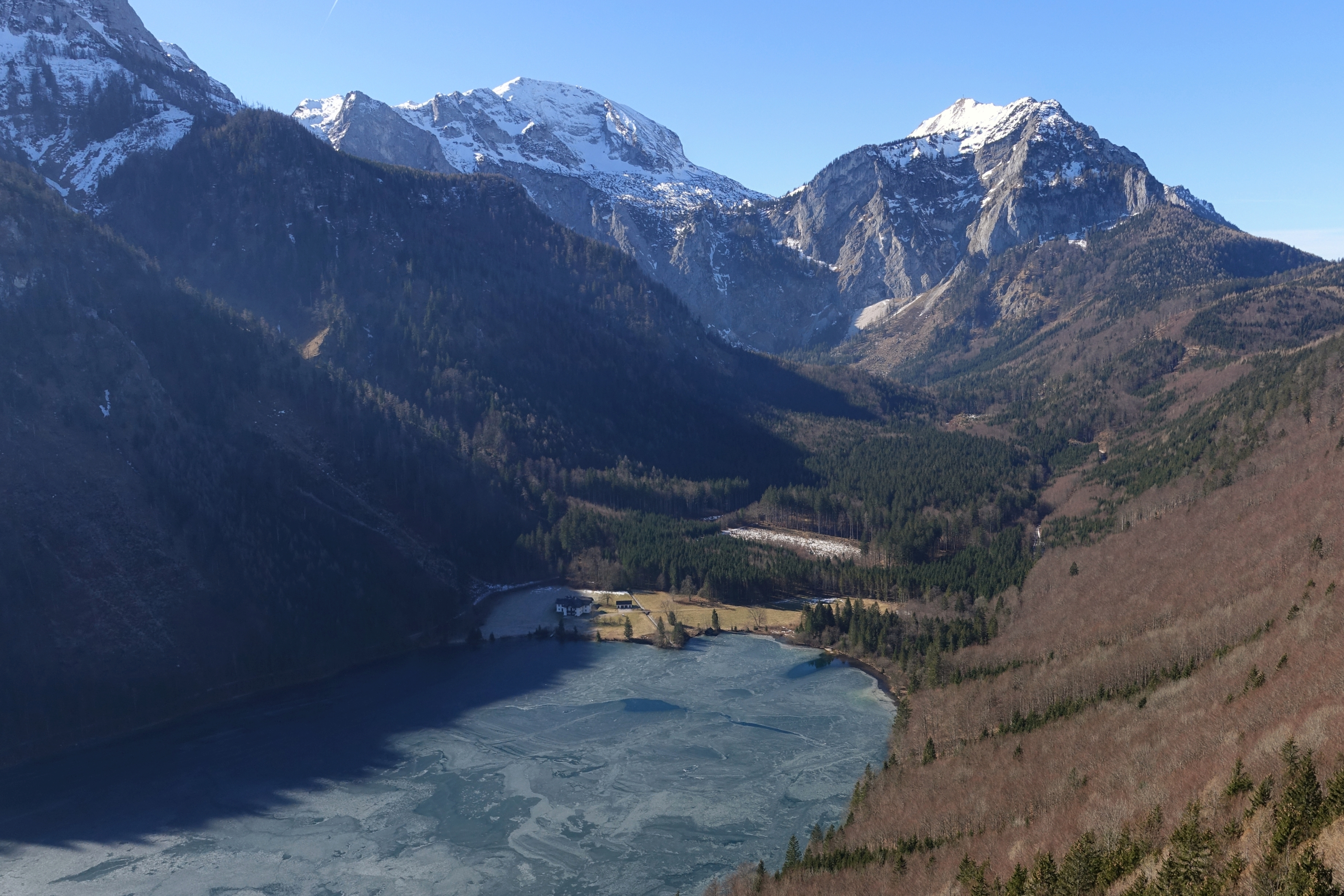
View of the eastern escarpment between Grünalmkogel (left) and Brunnkogel (right) and of the former glacier outflow through the Langbathtal

The Höllengebirge was always glaciated during the ice ages, with the glacier flowing little on the plateau and preserving the old landscape. On the flanks, however, the ice scoured cirques and avalanche chutes. The glacier courses of the Würm glaciation are particularly recognizable by the marked terminal moraines. The most powerful glacier developed in the catchment area of the Langbathbach from the cirques between the Brunn- and Alberfeldkogel. It filled the valley to a height of more than 800 m (2,600 ft) but could not cross the Lueg saddle to the Aurachtal. Another glacier tongue developed from the cirque around the Antoniusbründl. The terminal moraine is at the Kienklause inn. A glacier also formed in the Aurach cirque, filling the basin around the Taferlklaussee. Terminal moraines exist at the Großalm inn; they also form the Krahbergtaferl saddle. The glaciers flowing south merged with the Traun Glacier, specifically with its side branch flowing west through the Weißenbachtal

=== Hydrogeology ===
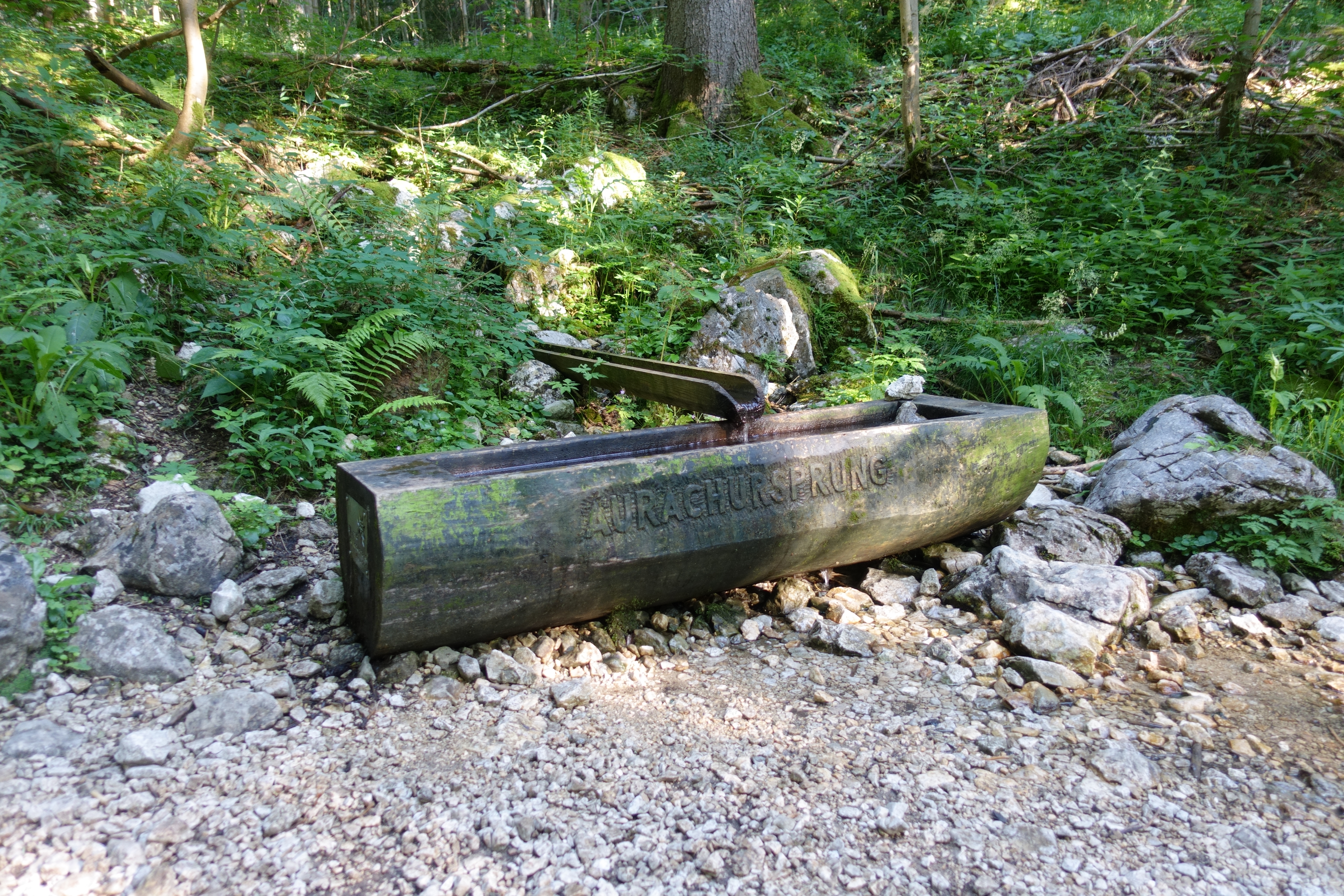
The Aurach spring in the Aurach cirque on the north side

The deeply karstified Wetterstein limestone of the Höllengebirge drains underground. Thus, there are no lakes or streams on the plateau and only very few springs such as the Antoniusbründl. The most numerous and highly productive karst springs are at the southern foot, only a few at the northern foot. This is due to the dip of the Höllengebirge nappe and the Langbath zone, as the nappe boundary is accompanied by water-impermeable sediments and there is a slight slope toward the south. The southward drainage was first proven in 1983 during a marking experiment by the Hydrological Investigation Office Salzburg, when a tracer was injected west of the Hochleckenkogel at the northern boundary and color passage was recorded exclusively at the Gimbach spring on the south side.

Discharge characteristics of the largest springs of the Höllengebirge based on monthly values from 1981 to 1984
Spring	Location	Elevation [m a.s.l.]	Minimum observed discharge [l/s]	Mean observed discharge [l/s]	Maximum observed discharge [l/s]
Schwarzenbach spring	South	520	70	538	2500
Gimbach spring	South	650	50	342	3500
Höllbach spring	South	600	50	326	2500
Miesenbach spring	East	455	24	916	9581

=== Karst ===
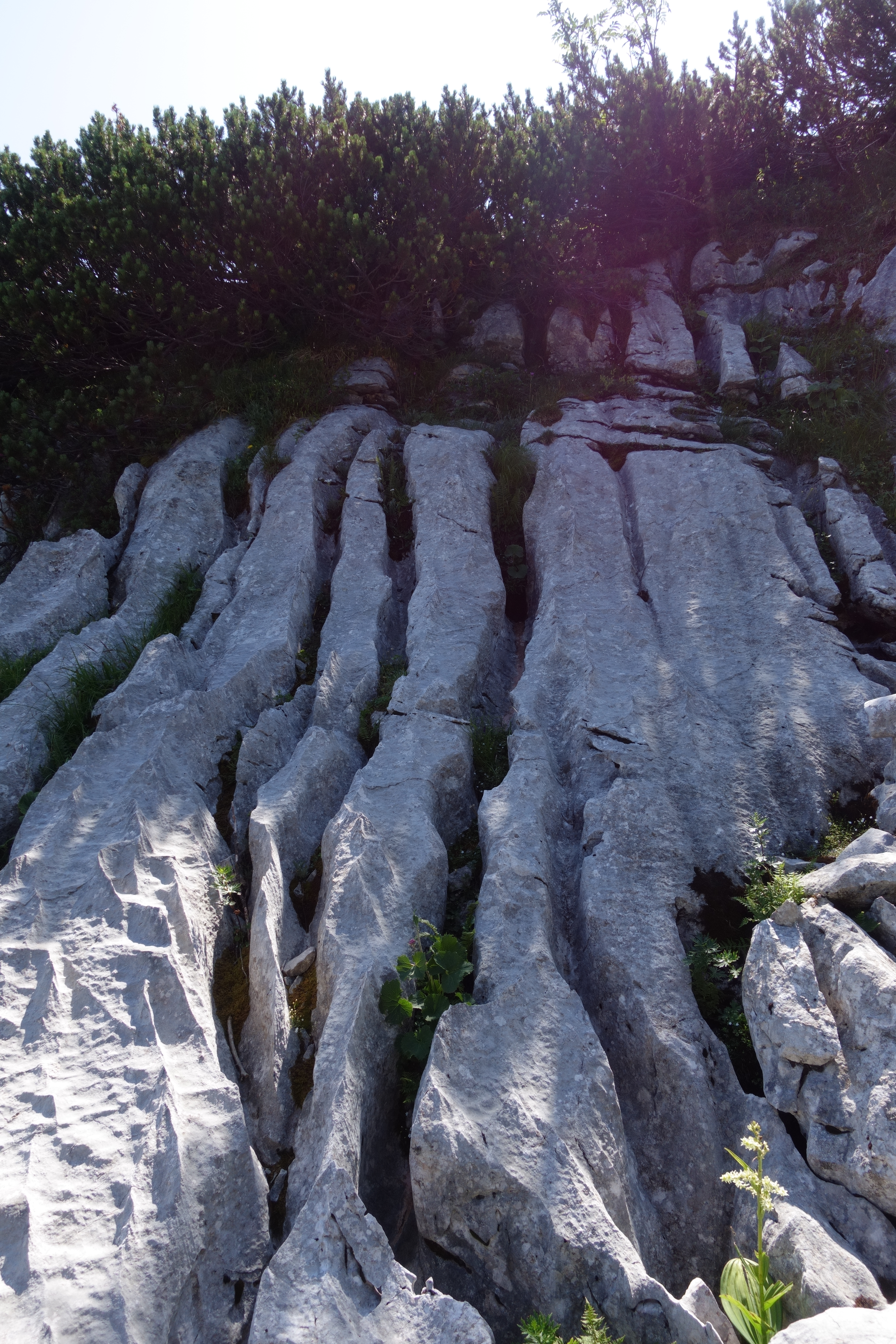
Solution grooves in the Hinterer Aurach cirque

Large parts of the Höllengebirge are karstified. The type and intensity of karstification depend strongly on elevation and rock type. Covered karst (green karst) dominates in the mountain, while bare karst (gray karst) is limited to a few glaciated bedding planes exposed by ice-age glaciers. Furthermore, Wetterstein limestone is more prone to karstification than Wetterstein dolomite. Among the typical superficial large forms, sinkholes are very common. They often align with geological faults and form sinkhole alleys, such as in the Haselwaldgasse. The sinkholes mostly have diameters between 5 and 10 m. In uvala-like hollow forms in the alpine area, glacial erosion overdeepening is often detectable. These are not pure karst forms but polygenetic forms. Among the small forms, karren dominate, especially joint karren. The most common exposed forms on steeper surfaces are fluted karren and solution grooves. Due to the lack of a large-scale bedding staircase landscape, pronounced karren fields are rare. Karren structures also occur below the forest line, such as rounded karren along alpine paths.

=== Caves ===
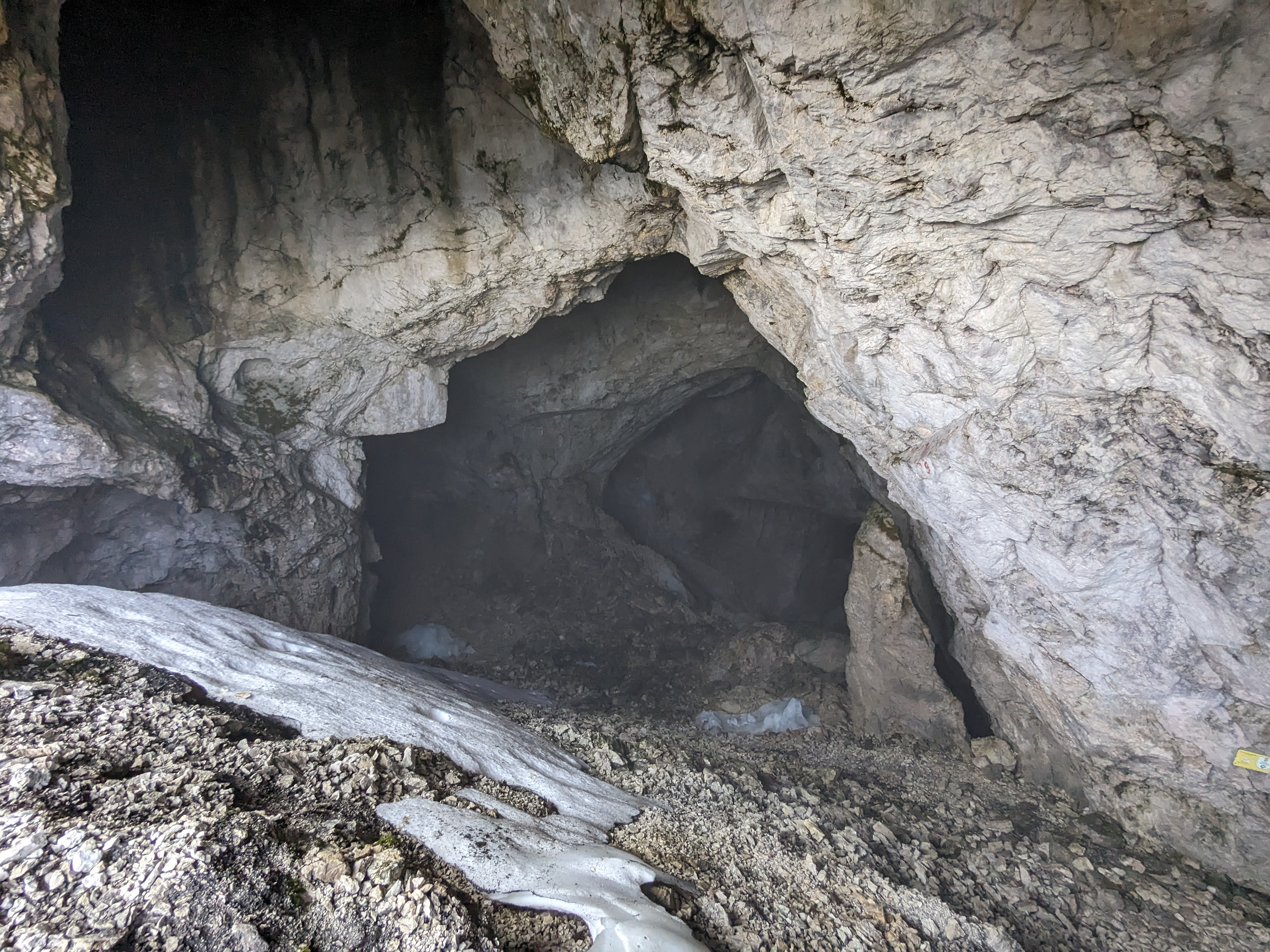
Entrance area of the Hochlecken-Großhöhle

The mostly steeply bedded and highly karstifiable Wetterstein limestone, in interaction with the other joint system, provides particularly favorable conditions for cave formation. As of 2019, 260 caves are registered in catalog group 1567 (Höllengebirge) of the Austrian Cave Register. Most cave entrances are in the plateau area of the Höllengebirge around 1,500 m (4,900 ft). With a surveyed length of 5805 m, the Hochlecken-Großhöhle (cat. no. 1567/29) is the longest cave in the Höllengebirge.

The five longest caves in the Höllengebirge
Name	Cat. no.	Surveyed length [m]	Vertical extent [m]
Hochlecken-Großhöhle	1567/29	5805	884
Rupertischacht	1567/76	1045	114
Spielberghöhle	1567/63	855	73
Totengrabenhöhle	1567/41	849	249
Gmundnerhöhle	1567/49	540	92

== Soils ==
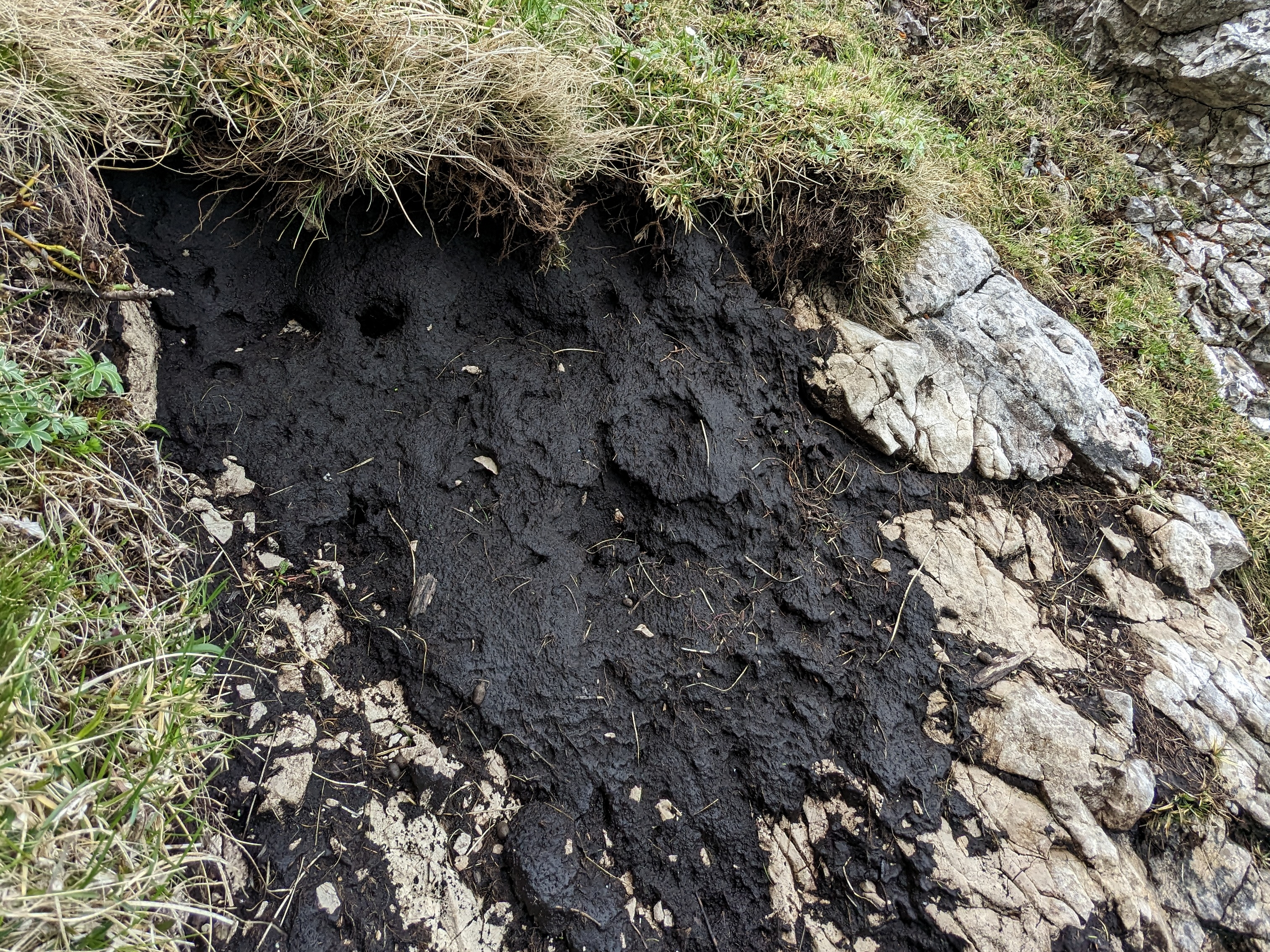
Pechrendzina on the Kugelzipf NW ridge, Höllengebirge

Starting from the dominant Wetterstein limestone and dolomite, mostly rendzina soils could develop in the high elevations. The largest areas are occupied by mull-like rendzinas. These mineral- and humus-rich soils occur mainly in slope positions of the montane level under herb-poor mixed and coniferous forests on almost all lime and dolomite rocks. In lower slope areas, stronger mull formation occurs under climatically favorable conditions, developing mull rendzinas or brown rendzinas. Older paleosols such as terra fusca are found in the Höllengebirge only in protected terrain depressions, such as in front of the Alberfeldkogel and the Hochleckenhaus as well as between the Jagerköpfel and the Hochleckenkogel. These soils are not only insoluble residues after limestone weathering but repeatedly redeposited soil formations of different ages. The input of loess dust probably also plays a role.

== Climate ==
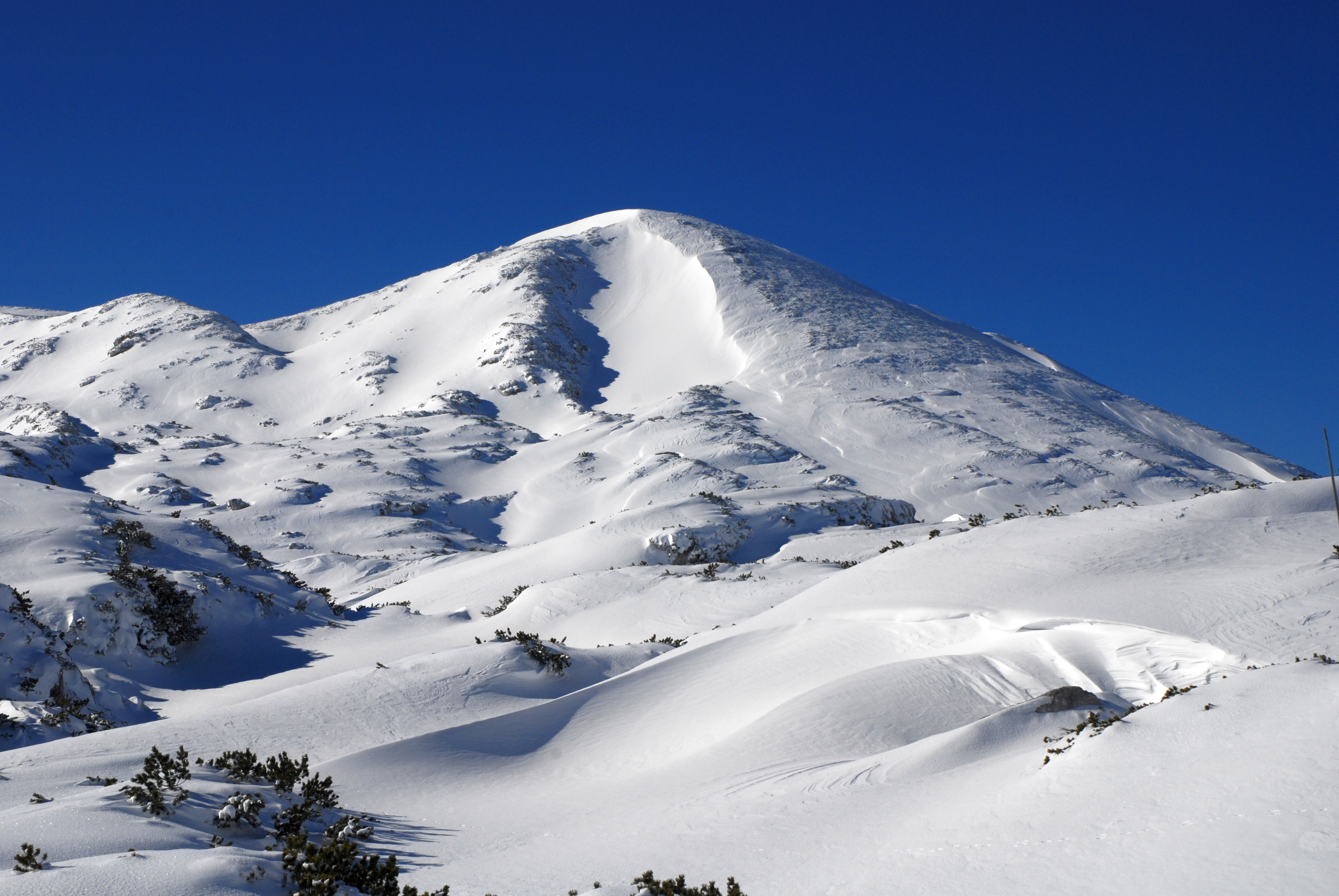
Großer Höllkogel, February 2007

The weather station of GeoSphere Austria at the Feuerkogel provides exact data for the Höllengebirge. The climate data show a temperature and precipitation distribution typical for the mountains of the northern Limestone Alps: cool and precipitation-rich summers, with a maximum of 238 mm in July, and low-precipitation winters, with a temperature minimum of −3.5 °C in February. Due to the northern congestion, however, there is a secondary maximum from November to January. The mean annual precipitation is 1829 mm with an annual mean temperature of 3.6 °C. There is a closed snow cover of more than 20 cm on 170 days per year. The maximum snow depth is 270 cm. Due to the cool summers, long cold winters, and high precipitation, the climate can be described as cold temperate according to Ruttner and is thus comparable to a mountain climate with the boreal zone. According to Heinrich Walter, this corresponds to zonobiome VIII.

=== Wind ===
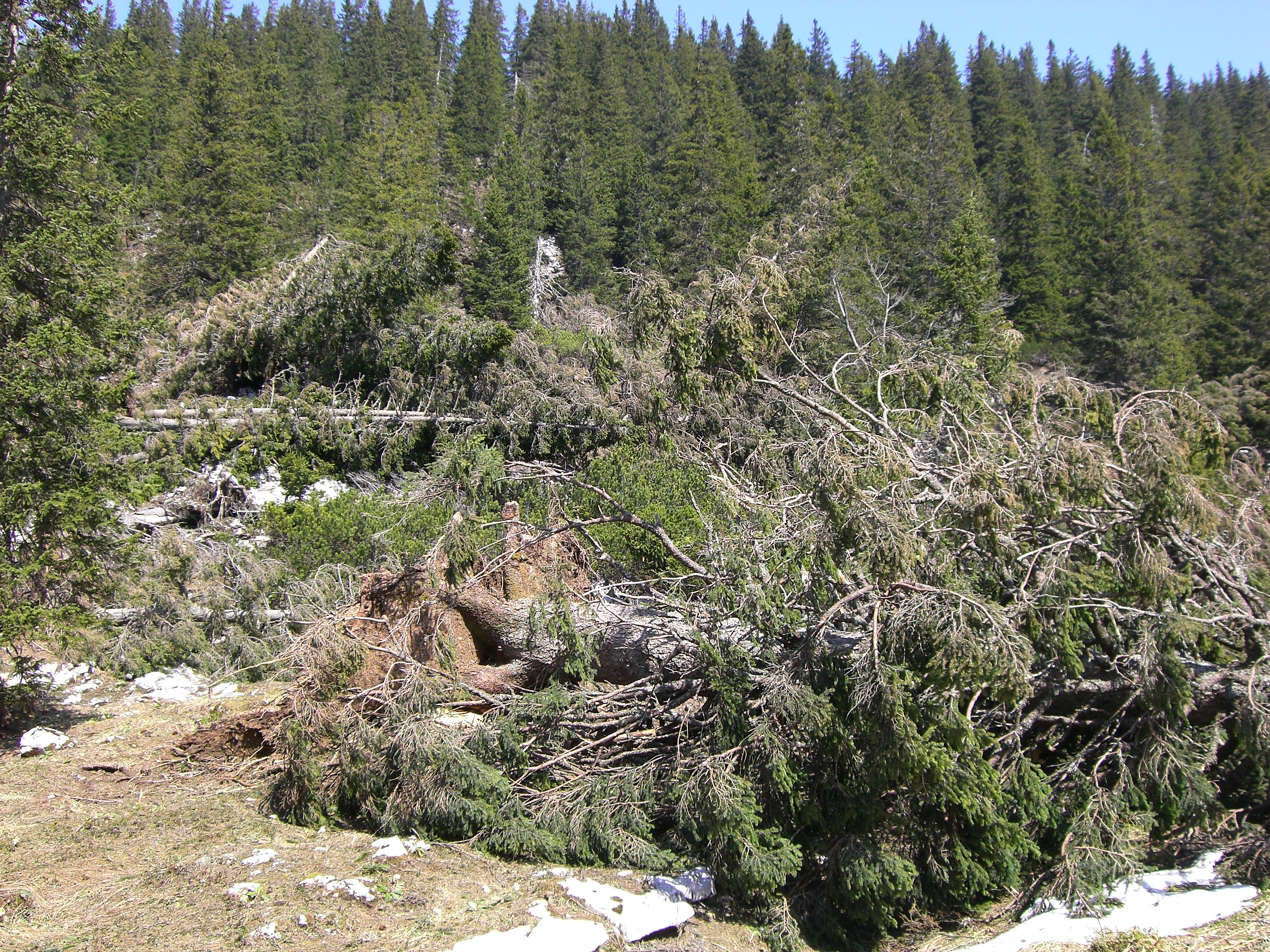
Windthrow in the Bleggagraben after Cyclone Kyrill in January 2007

Due to the exposed location of the weather station, very high wind speeds are often measured. Cyclone Kyrill reached a measured peak of 207 km/h there. According to an interview with the attendant on duty, however, the anemometer failed at 220 km/h and the storm increased in strength afterward. The prevailing wind direction is predominantly west to northwest. With about 14%, there is a secondary maximum of southerly winds. On 42 days per year, Beaufort scale 8 is exceeded.

== Flora and vegetation ==
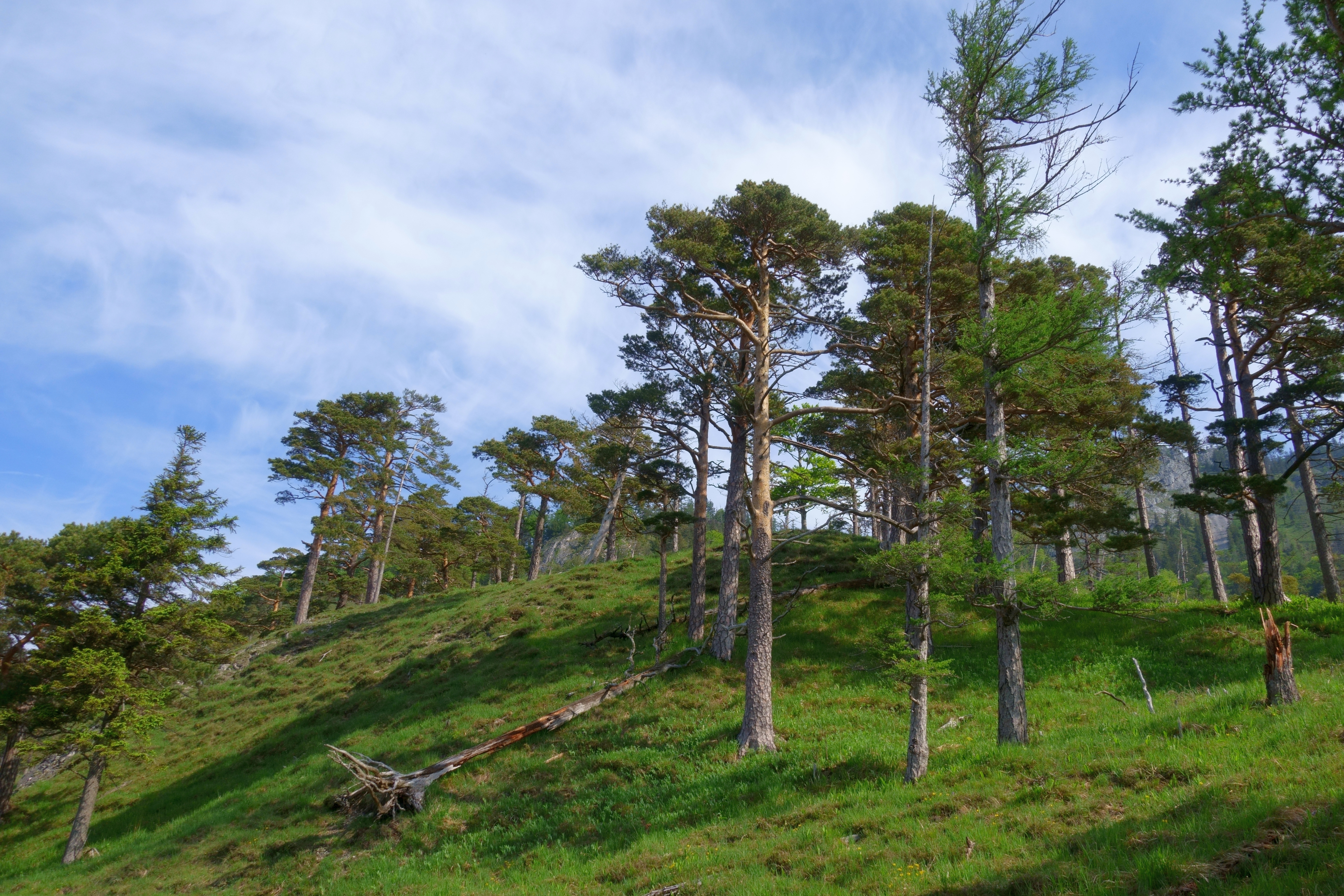
Scots pines (Pinus sylvestris) on shallow Wetterstein dolomite (Schoberstein south flank)

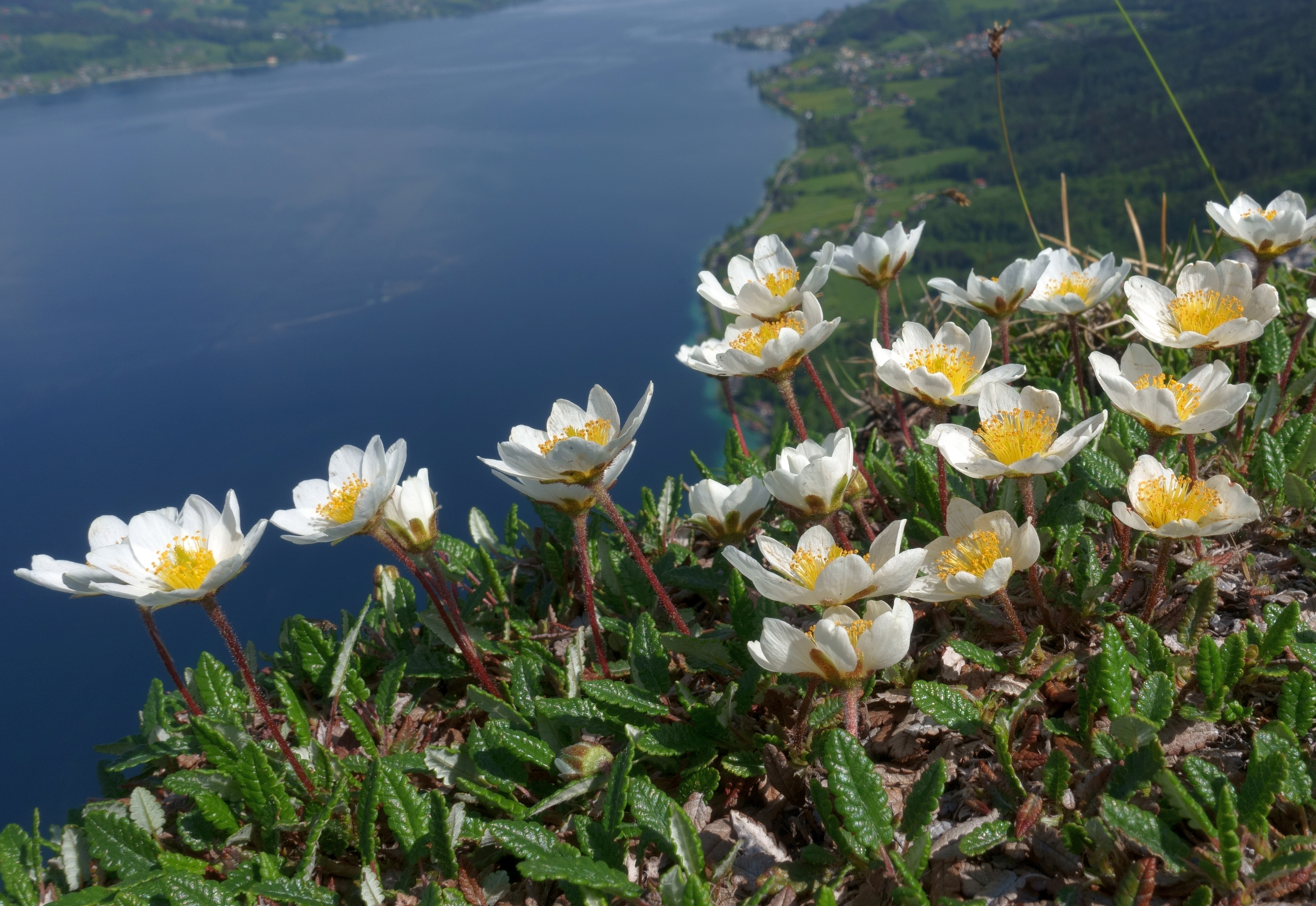
The mountain avens (Dryas octopetala) thrives from the montane level to the summit area of the Großer Höllkogel (Kleiner Schoberstein)

Among the forest communities, spruce and beech forests dominate on the flanks of the Höllengebirge. The Norway spruce (Picea abies) forms more than 50% of the tree stand. Its broad ecological amplitude with regard to soil and water balance requirements enables it to occur in all forest communities. It grows on south-facing steep, dry slab shoots as well as at its extreme site in the raised bog of the Taferlklaussee. Its climax is reached north-facing in the subalpine tall-herb spruce forest and partly forms the forest line at 1,500 m (4,900 ft). The European beech (Fagus sylvatica) is present in the area with 30–40%. It grows on the south side of the Höllengebirge up to elevations around 1,400 m (4,600 ft). North-facing, the limit is at 1,000 m (3,300 ft). Depending on the site, there are also silver firs (Abies alba), Scots pines (Pinus sylvestris), European larches (Larix decidua), European ashes (Fraxinus excelsior), and sycamore maples (Acer pseudoplatanus). The community of the mountain pine (Pinus mugo) dominates the entire Höllengebirge plateau. On the northern slopes, it often descends to 800 m (2,600 ft) in scree slopes, for example in the Langer Graben. On the other hand, it rises to the summit region of the Großer Höllkogel and leaves only extreme rock and wind zones free. Between fields of mountain pine are individual fragments of turf communities (mainly the rusty sedge turf). Snow hollows occur island-like in shady sinkholes, such as in the Höllkogelgrube, which only dry out in extremely dry years.

A total of 576 vascular plant species (Tracheophyta) have been identified in the area, including many plant species that are common in the Northern Limestone Alps. A selection of these is listed below:

- Primula clusiana
- Primula wulfeniana
- Gentiana clusii
- hairy alpenrose (Rhododendron hirsutum)
- martagon lily (Lilium martagon)
- globe flower (Trollius europaeus)

For the Seseli austriacum and the Asperula neilreichii, the Höllengebirge is the westernmost site. Of the occurring fungi, many are associated with the mountain pine or spruce. These include, for example:

- Suillus granulatus
- Hygrophorus chrysodon
- Hygrophorus lucorum var. speciosus
- Melanoleuca subalpina
- Entoloma formosum
- Inocybe leptophylla, syn. Inocybe casimiri
- Cortinarius odorifer

== Fauna ==
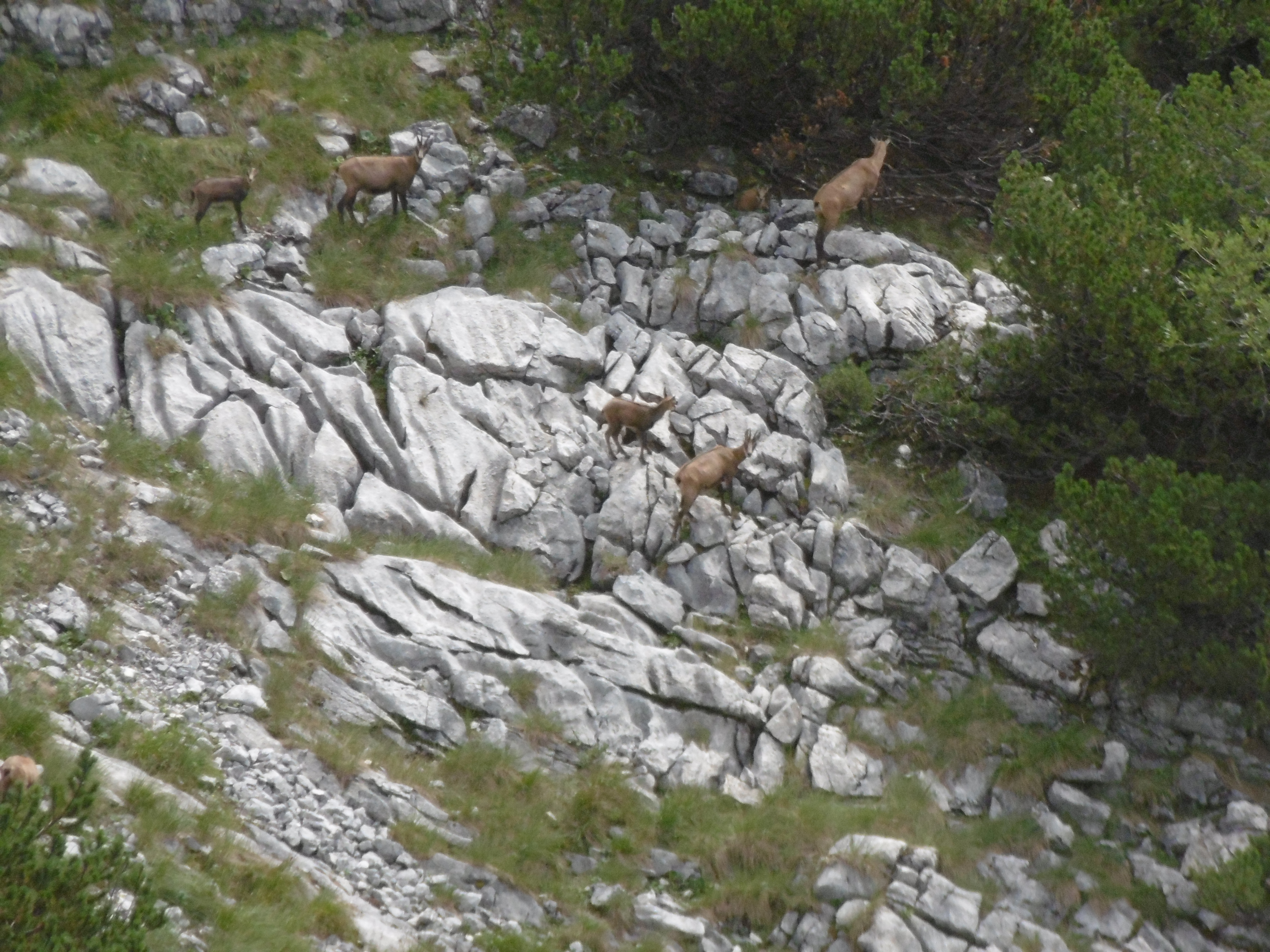
Chamois herd in the Höllengebirge

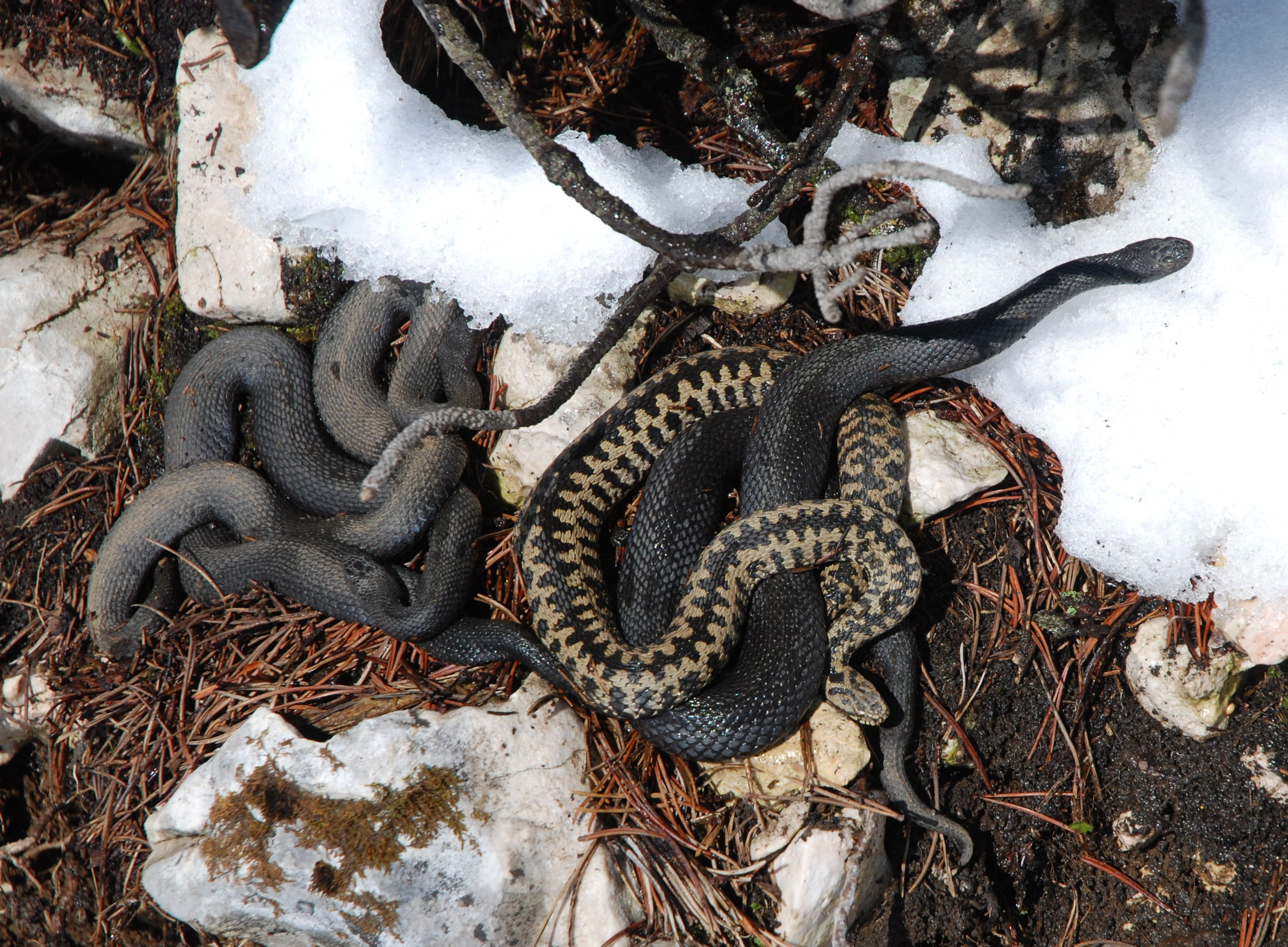
Common European vipers (including the color variant Höllenottern) south of the Heumahdgupf

The Höllengebirge is a retreat area for roe deer (Capreolus capreolus), red deer (Cervus elaphus), and chamois (Rupicapra rupicapra); the animals occur in high densities. mountain hares (Lepus timidus) also live in the area. Alpine choughs (Pyrrhocorax graculus) and common ravens (Corvus corax) are frequently encountered. Rarer are rock ptarmigan (Lagopus muta), black grouse (Lyrurus tetrix), and western capercaillie (Tetrao urogallus). Alpine accentors (Prunella collaris) and wallcreepers (Tichodroma muraria) have also been recorded. The Höllengebirge is also a distribution area for the golden eagle (Aquila chrysaetos), but without breeding records. The Eurasian eagle-owl (Bubo bubo) could only be indirectly proven at the Schoberstein (pellets). The common European viper (Vipera berus) and its black color variant Höllenotter are also widespread in the Höllengebirge. For many animals of the alpine regions, the Höllengebirge together with the Traunstein forms the northern limit of their distribution areas in Upper Austria. This applies to the Alpine salamander (Salamandra atra) as well as to the already mentioned golden eagles, Alpine choughs, Alpine accentors, and wallcreepers. In 2017, the Höllengebirge was briefly the territory of a Eurasian lynx (Lynx lynx). The lynx male Juri, released into the Kalkalpen National Park on March 17, 2017, migrated widely over the Krems and Alm valleys into the Salzkammergut after release. The lynx equipped with a radio collar remained there for nine months in a defined territory. At the beginning of 2018, it suddenly set off on a journey and returned through the Styrian Enns valley and over the Pyhrn Pass to the Kalkalpen National Park.

== Nature conservation ==
The mountain lakes at the foot of the Höllengebirge are under nature protection. In the north, this is the Taferlklaussee nature reserve (n039) with an area of 8.51 ha, in the east the Vorderer Langbathsee (n010) and Hinterer Langbathsee (n011) with 36.55 ha and 12.47 ha respectively. The Attersee and the lower course of the Äußerer Weißenbach are part of the Mondsee-Attersee European Protected Area.

== Etymology ==
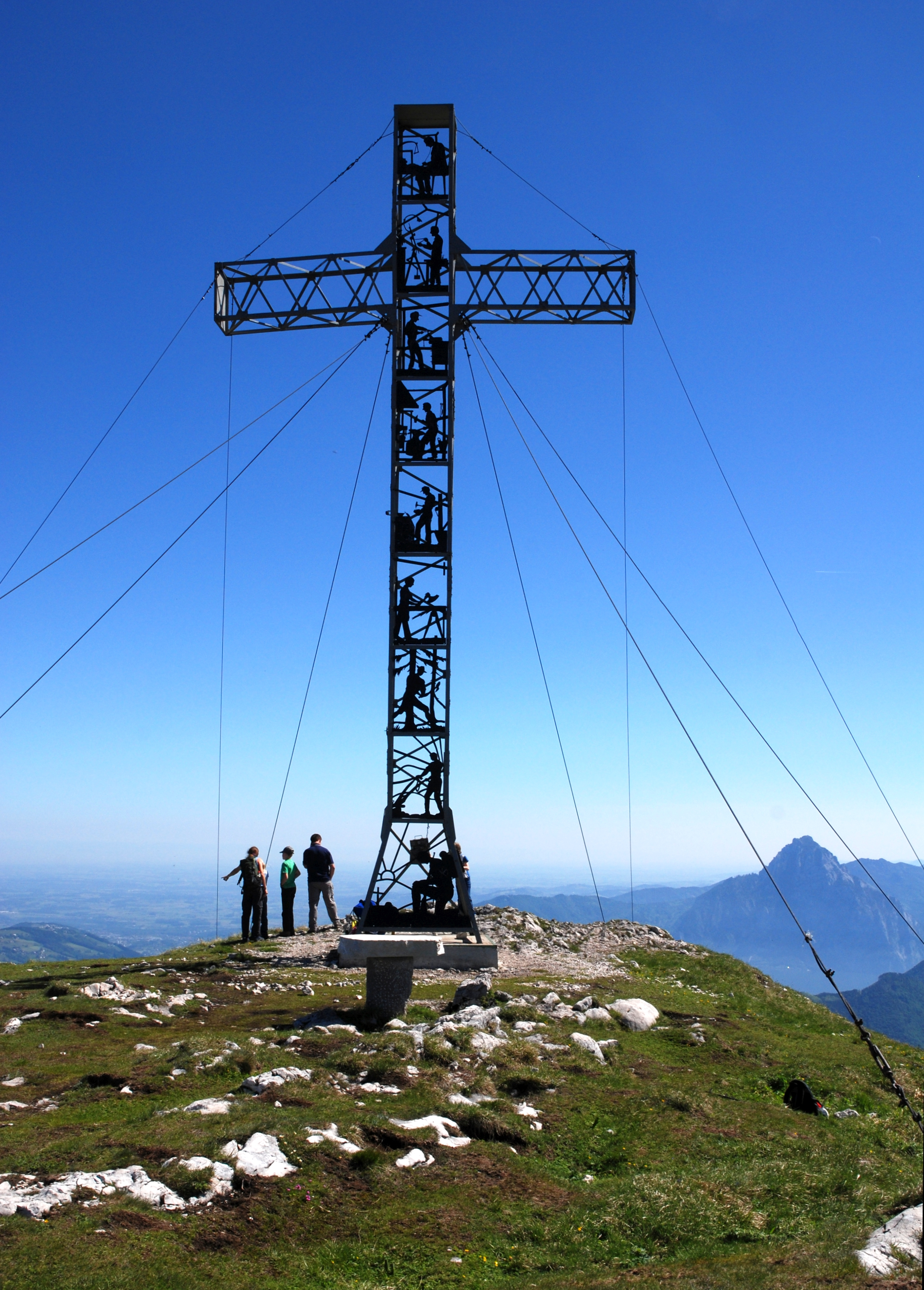
The 14 m high summit cross on the Brunnkogel, 2007

The wild cirque "In der Höll" on the south side of the mountain gives its name to the range, the Großer Höllkogel, and the Höllbach springing there. Many summit and place names go back to the vegetation. The Eiblgupf refers to the yew (Taxus baccata), the Segenbaumkogel derives from the savine (Juniperus sabina), the Elexenkogel from the bird cherry (Prunus padus), Hochlecken from the Lecken, a local name for the mountain pine (Pinus mugo), and the Kranabethsattel points to the Kranabethstaude, the common juniper (Juniperus communis). Salt licks for wildlife led to the names Salzkogel and Salzberg. The western capercaillie probably gave the Spielberg its name. Latschen (mountain pine) and forest fires led to the names Brennerin, Brunn- or Brenntakogel. The Feuerkogel also refers to fires or midsummer bonfires. The Grenzeck has long been a boundary of areas and properties. Today, the district boundary between Vöcklabruck and Gmunden runs here. The Pfaffengraben refers to Traunkirchen Abbey, the original owner of this area. The Mahdlgupf and the Mahdlschneid refer to a former farm below the ridge (Schneid). The farm was called Mahdbauer and was the now abandoned forestry office. A small meadow is called Mahdl. The Jagdhaus Aufzug got its name from a hydraulic lift built in 1722. The place name Schiffau in the Langbathtal goes back to the extraction of shipbuilding timber for the construction of Zillen.

== Mountaineering ==
=== Development ===
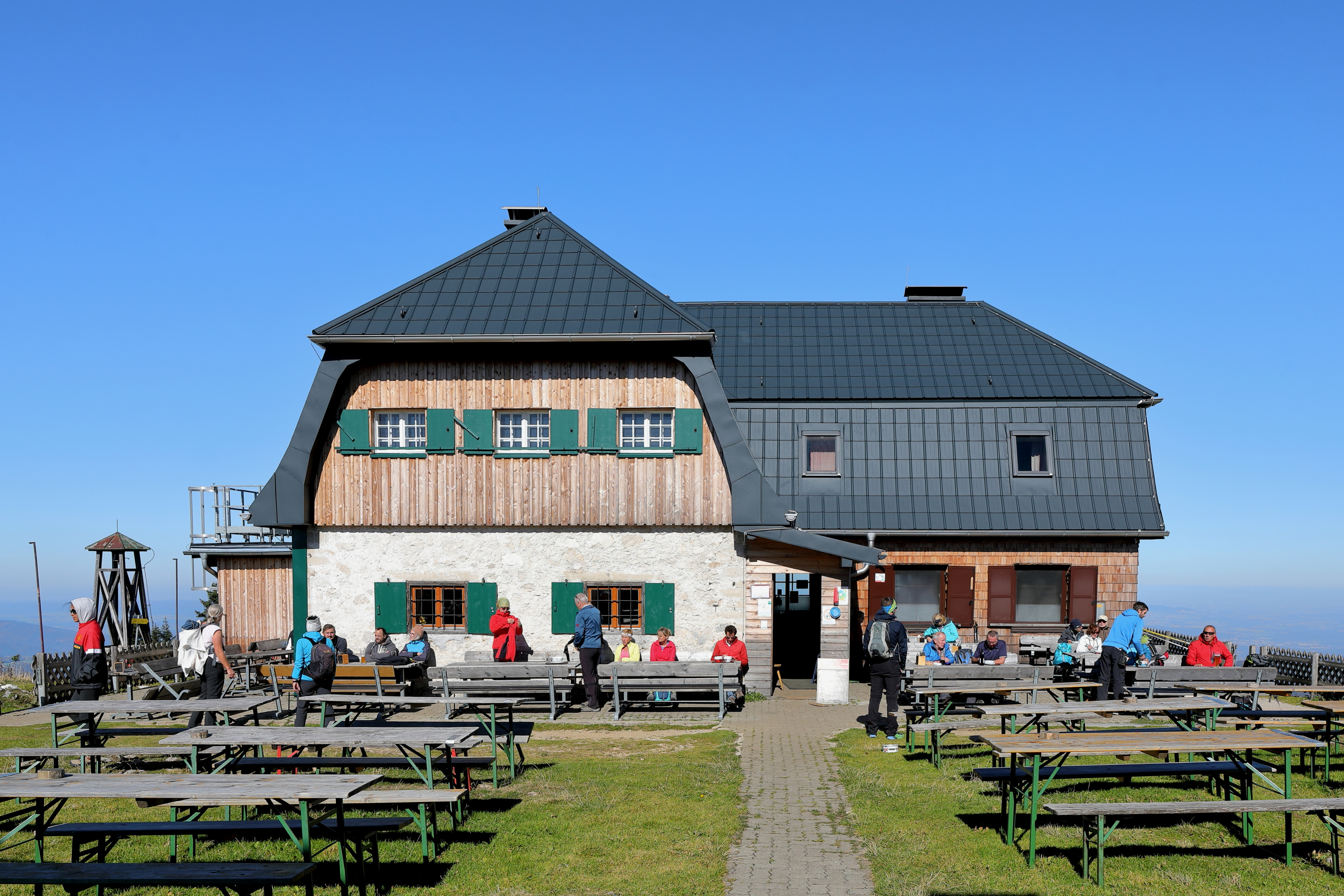
The Hochleckenhaus, 2018

Until 1914, entering the imperial hunting area in the central part of the Höllengebirge required a special permit from the k. u. k. forestry administration, so development started relatively late compared to other mountains. Obtaining trail rights for an ascent to the plateau was difficult, and only in 1910, three years after the founding of the Alpine Club section Vöcklabruck, was it allowed to build the Stieg and the Brennerriesensteig on the west side. About three-quarters of the trail costs of 1333 kronen were covered by the industrialist and founder of the Eternit works, Ludwig Hatschek. Before 1914, the marked trail from the Taferlklaussee through the Langer Graben to the Griesalm could be opened. In 1925, the Vöcklabruck section opened the Hochleckenhaus and acquired the previously leased property from the Austrian Federal Forests. On the east side, it took eight years until the section Gmunden, founded in 1902, was allowed to build the trail from the alpine area of the Feuerkogel over the Großer Höllkogel to the Spitzalm and in 1911 to erect the Kranabethsattelhütte at the Feuerkogel under strict conditions. Also in 1927, the Naturfreunde local group Attnang built a small hut, which was soon expanded into the Naturfreundehaus. The last of the four refuge huts, the Rieder Hütte, was built in 1929. During the Second World War and the first postwar years, tourism, club life of the sections, and mountaineering came to a standstill. With increasing enthusiasm for the mountains, more holidaymakers joined the local mountaineers from 1950 onward. The huts were renovated and expanded. Next to the Hochleckenhaus, a youth home (1960) and the material cable car (1965) were built. The Rieder Hütte burned down in 1973 and was reopened after reconstruction in 1975. The Kranabethsattelhütte was sold in 1990 and burned down to the foundations in 1991. In March 2012, the Naturfreundehaus was sold and has since been called Kranabeth-Hütte.

=== Hiking ===
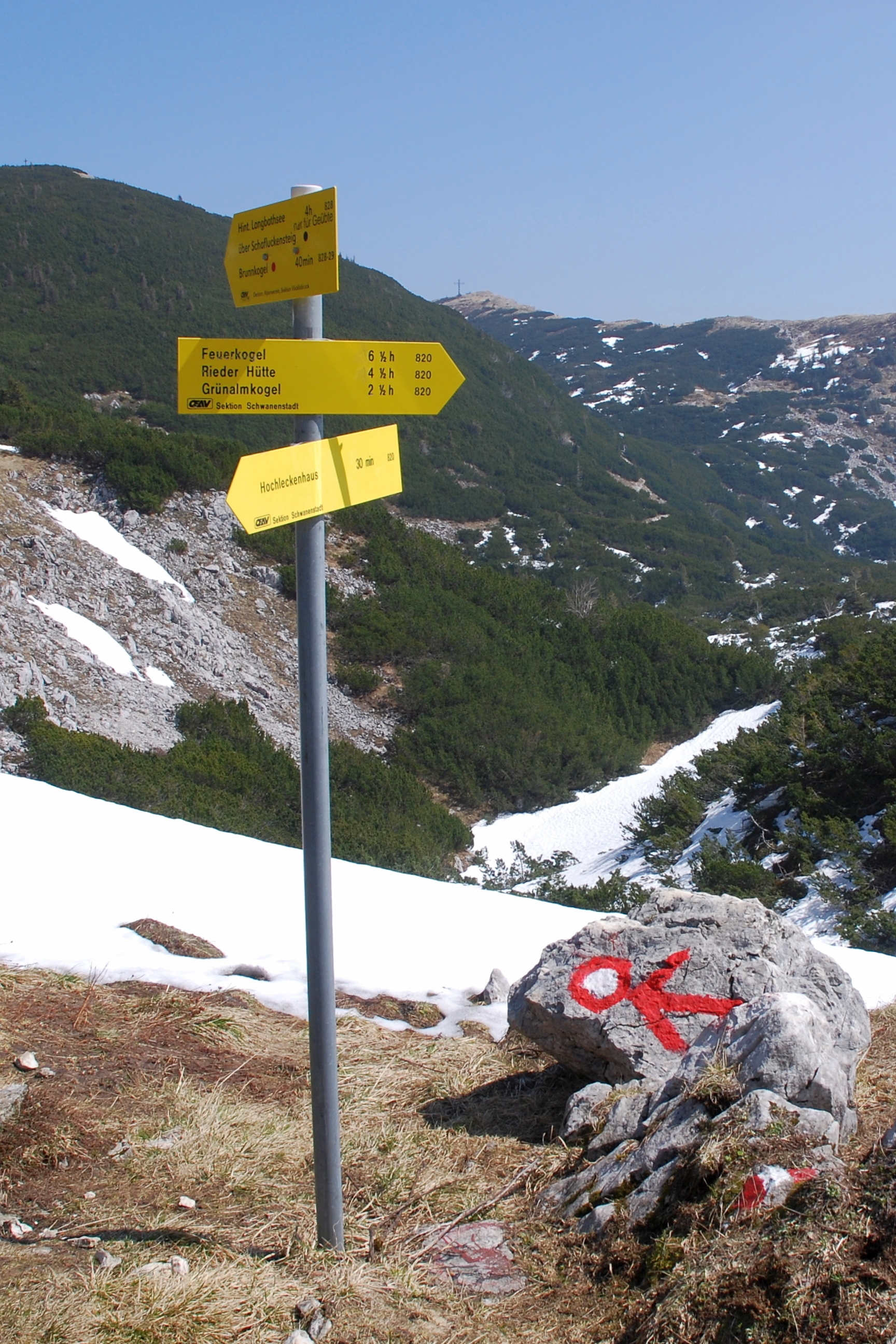
Signage on trail 820

The marked and signposted trail network in the Höllengebirge is maintained by the Austrian Alpine Club. The trails are numbered 820 to 837. The Austrian long-distance trail 04 crosses the mountain from east to west. This trail bears the number 804 as the Voralpenweg, is marked 820 in the Höllengebirge, and has its highest point at the Grünalmkogel. Ascents to the plateau exist on the west, north, and east sides. The best known are:

- Trail 820: From Weißenbach am Attersee over the Schoberstein to the Brennerin in the west or from Ebensee to the Feuerkogel in the east
- Trail 821 Brennerriesensteig from the forestry office to the Brennerin
- Trail 822 Stieg from Steinbach am Attersee to the Gaisalm
- Trail 824 from the Kienklause to the Hochleckenhaus
- Trail 825 from the Taferklause to the Hochleckenhaus
- Trail 828 Schafluckensteig from the Hinterer Langbathsee to the Schafalm
- Trail 832 from the Kreh to the Feuerkogel

=== Alpinism ===
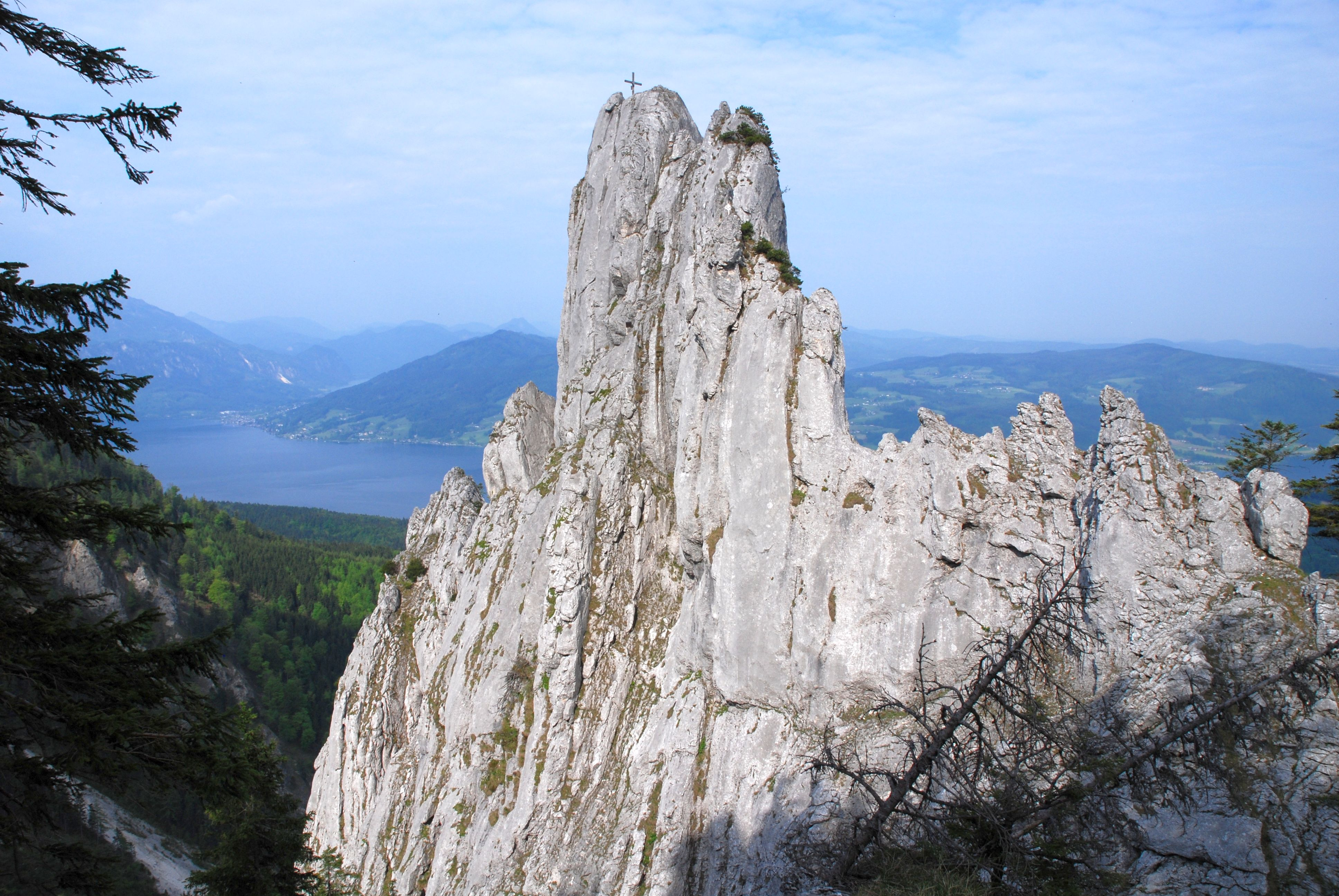
The Adlerspitze offers 55 routes in all difficulty grades

The climbing development started late, around 1920, in contrast to other, more spectacular mountain groups. The difficult towers and walls on the steep northern escarpments of the Höllengebirge were reserved for regional climbers. Especially the Gmunden climbers Sepp Stahrl, Josef Mulzet, Max Huemer, Hans Meiseleder, and Franz Stadler succeeded in difficult first ascents during this time, such as Eiblgupf northeast wall (V) and Alberfeldkogel northeast pillar (IV−). In the western Höllengebirge, active development by Vöcklabruck climbers began in the 1930s. Sepp Heizendorfer, Scheibenpflug, Hans Matterbauer, Wilhelm Stix, and Gustav Neubacher were particularly successful at the Adlerspitze, the Steinerne Männer, and the Vöcklabrucker Turm. In 1938, climbers Franz Scheckenberger and Hias Aigner succeeded in the northwest edge of the Seeturm (V) and the north wall of the middle summit of the Adlerspitze (V). After World War II, further development was continued mainly by young climbers from the Alpine Club local group Kammer and the Naturfreunde local groups Lenzing and Vöcklabruck. Today, especially in the western Höllengebirge, there are many sport climbing routes up to grade IX. In May 2011, the HTL-Wels via ferrata of the Naturfreunde Ebensee was opened at the Alberfeldkogel. In 2012, a via ferrata was installed at the Mahdlgupf in the west of the Höllengebirge. In 2010, a new development phase began by a group around the Linz mountaineer Robert Wacha. This mainly concerns the southern walls of the Weißenbachtal as well as the Totengrabenkessel in the north. Thus, in winter 2015, the first ascent of the south wall of the Großer Höllkogel was achieved, and in 2017 the first ascent of the Hirschlucken north wall.

=== Winter sports ===
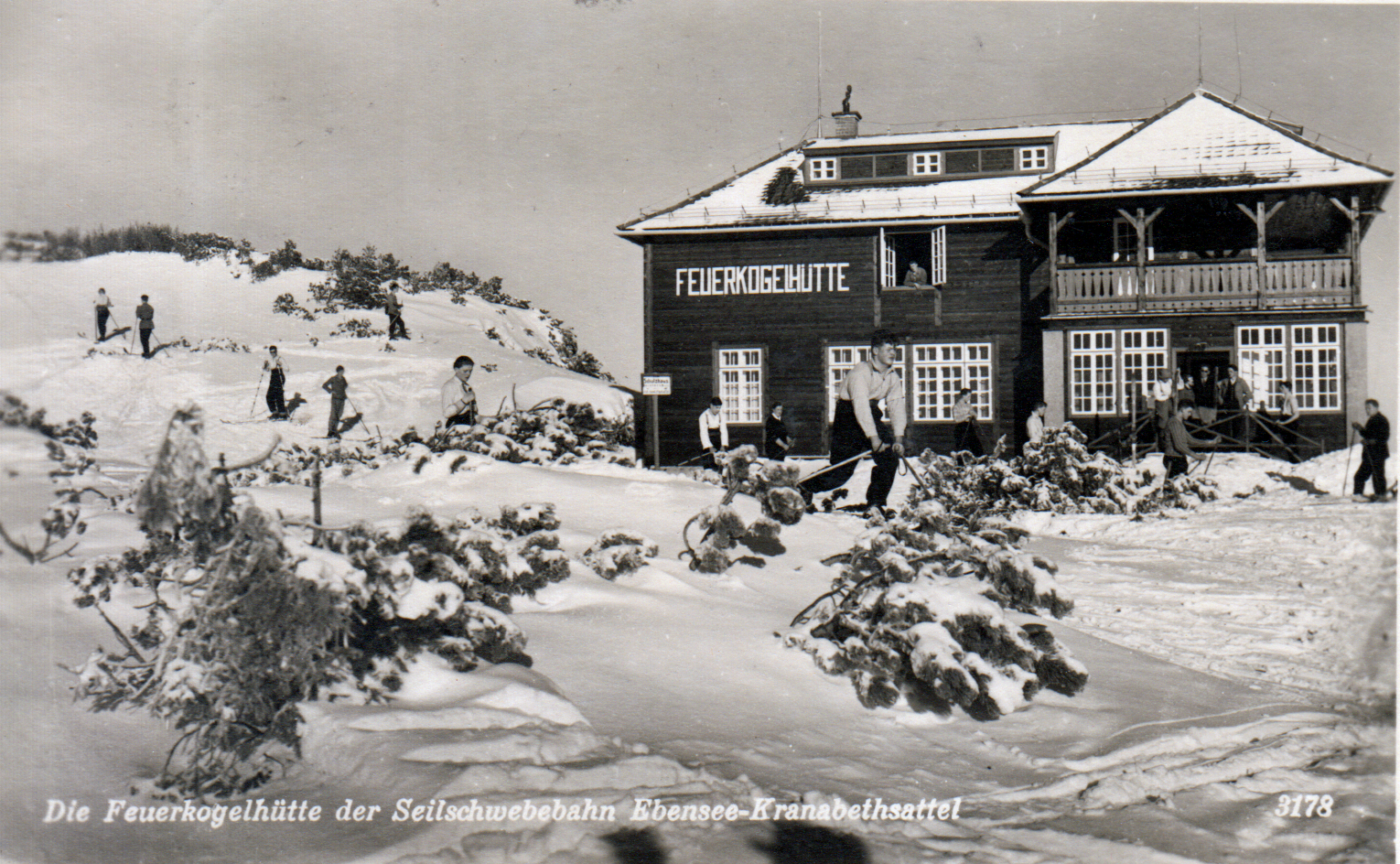
Ski operations at the Feuerkogelhütte, 1932

On the initiative of Rudolf Ippisch, the Feuerkogelseilbahn was put into operation on June 26, 1927. Although skiing was becoming increasingly popular in Upper Austria, the cable car initially served as an ascent aid for ski tours on the surrounding high plateau. In 1936, the first drag lift in Austria was built with the so-called pole lift. In 2010, the ski area was further expanded with the construction of a supply road, eight-person gondola, and six-person chairlift as well as the creation of some pistes. In addition to the Alpine Club huts, several private inns and huts as well as a hut village offer accommodation. There are a total of eight lift systems for 16 km of pistes at the Feuerkogel, of which 6 km are ungroomed.

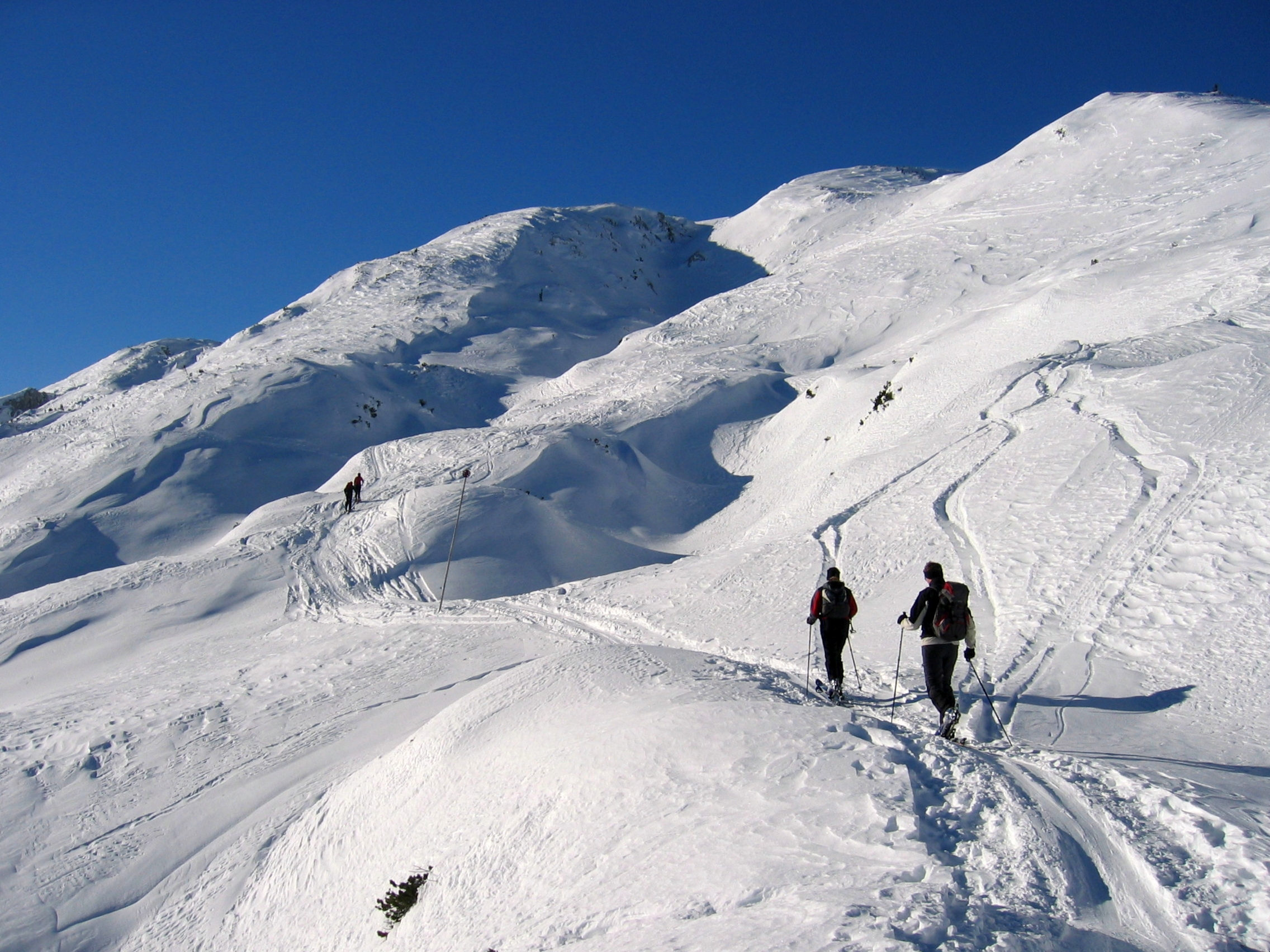
Ski tour to the Großer Höllkogel

The high plateau is also suitable for snowshoe and ski tours. The Höllengebirge crossing from the Feuerkogel to the Hochleckenhaus, marked with winter signs, is the longest ski tour in the area. Further skiing opportunities exist at the Hochlecken lifts, which were built in the 1970s in the western part of the Höllengebirge near the Taferklause. There are four groomed pistes and four drag lifts available.

=== Paragliding and hang gliding ===
The Höllengebirge is a well-known area for paragliding. The plateau at the Feuerkogel offers good launch sites with its slope. Designated areas are in the north and southeast. In the north, there is a launch ramp for hang gliding. The Griesalm near the Hochleckenhaus is also used as a launch site for paragliders. From the height, the air sportsman has a good view of a large part of the Salzkammergut.

== Economy ==
=== Tourism ===
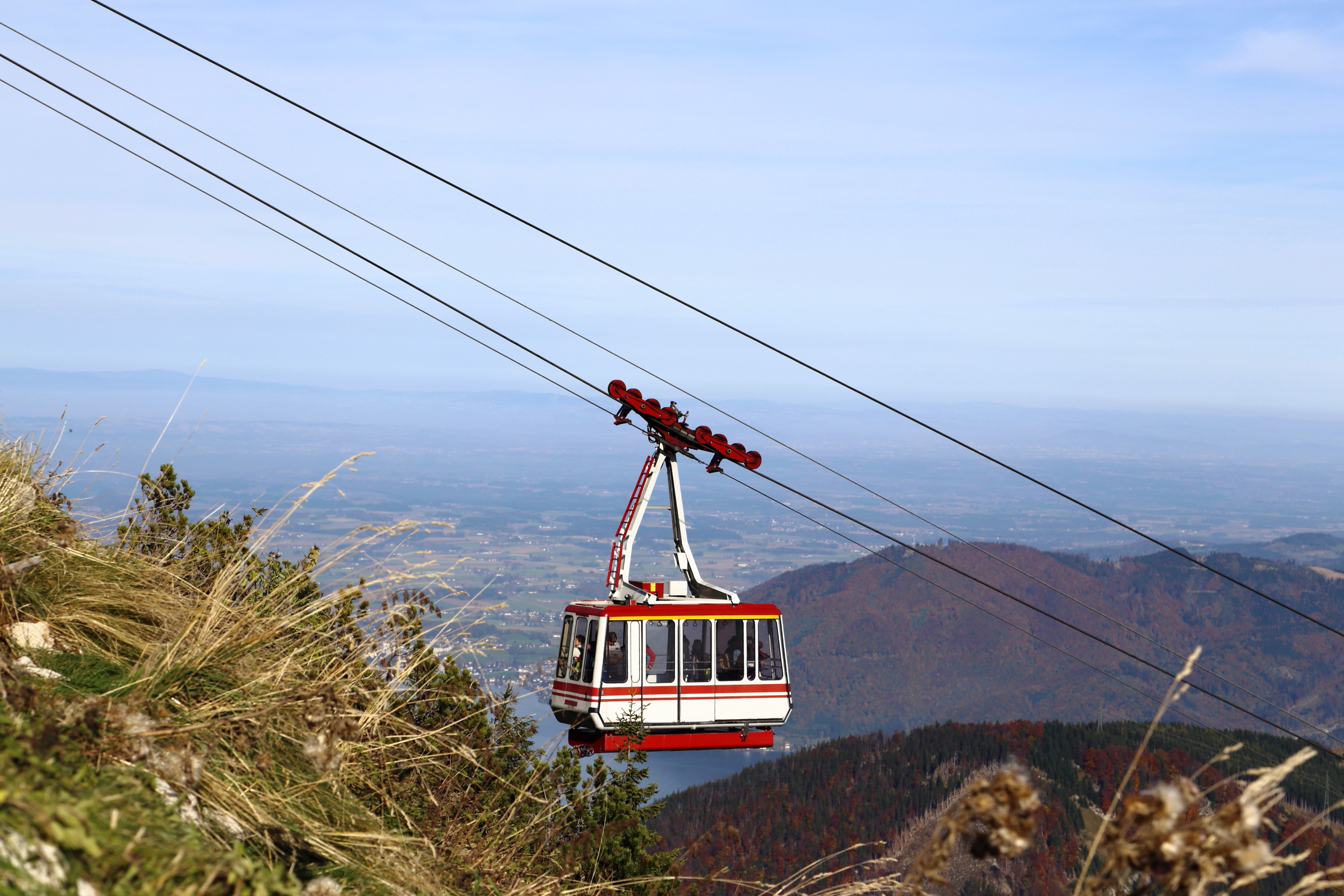
Gondola of the Feuerkogelseilbahn, 2013

The Salzkammergut enjoys a high level of recognition as a tourism and recreation area and has long had great importance in this regard. The tourist focus in the summer season is the classic summer retreat at the numerous lakes and mountains. Many huts offer food and overnight accommodation. One of the most popular mountain tours is a visit to the Hochleckenhaus. The number of day visitors is increasing, and on beautiful summer and autumn days, especially on weekends, the parking lots are often overloaded. In October 2022, the influx of visitors to the Vorderer Langbathsee caused an overload, and the Langbathsee Straße had to be closed. To channel the flow of visitors, parking management is to be introduced. The municipality of Steinbach am Attersee has been part of the Mountaineering villages initiative of the ÖAV since 2008. The goal is to develop sustainable alpine tourism in the sense of the Alpine Convention.

=== Alpine farming ===
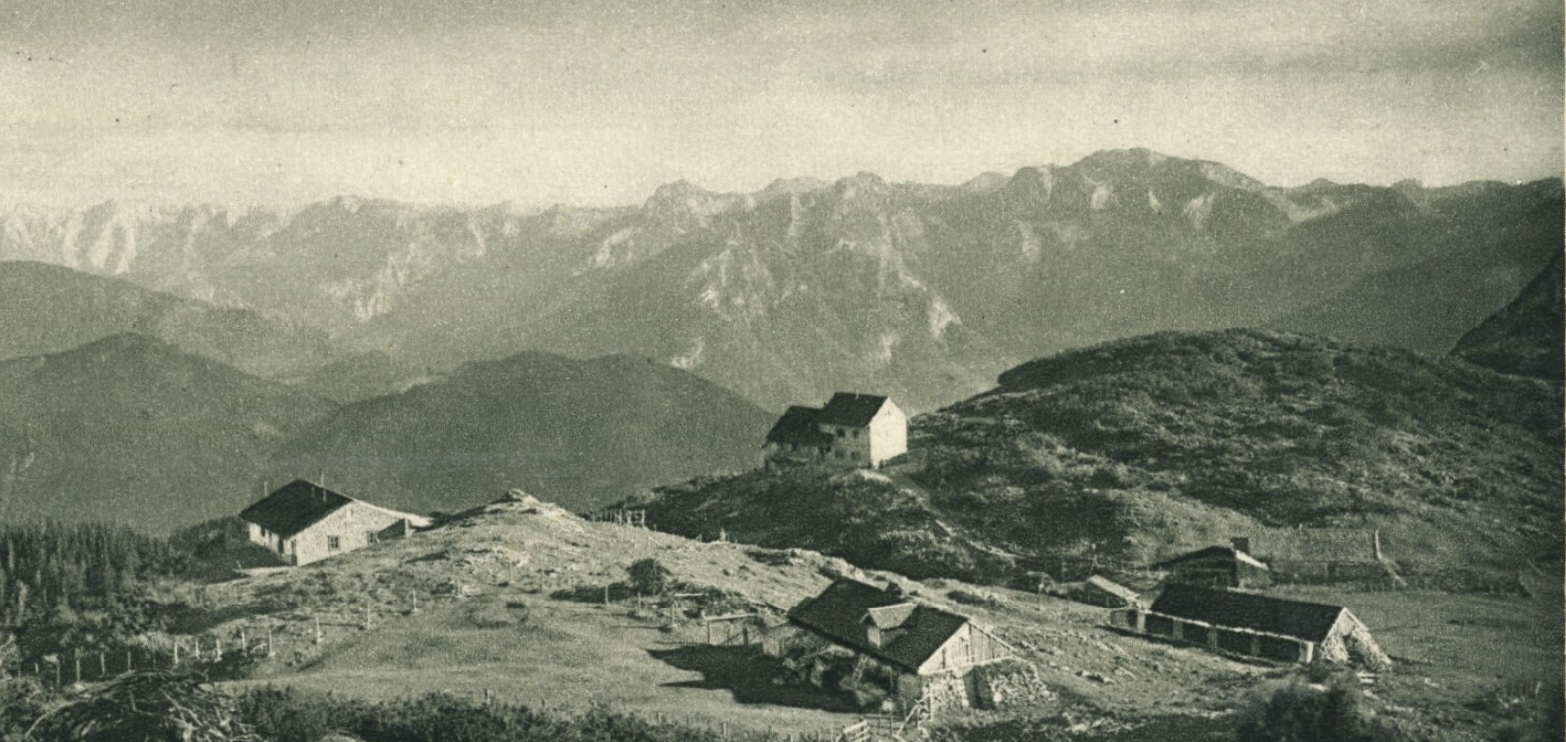
Kranabethsattelalm, 1923

A large number of alpine pastures served alpine farming, whose importance declined sharply in the 20th century. Place names such as Gaisalm and Schafalm indicate the formerly greater distribution, and numerous foundation walls of decayed huts, such as at the Hintere Spitzalm, recall this. In 1864, a regulatory decree by the k. u. k. provincial commission imposed a grazing ban for sheep and goats and fixed the grazing rights and the permissible number of livestock to counteract the danger of disease transmission and the associated restriction of imperial hunting. In 2019, only the Grießalm near the Hochleckenhaus and the Kranabethsattelalm at the Feuerkogel were managed. The grazing area of the two servitude alms is 47 hectares, on which 65 cattle graze.

=== Forestry ===
With the construction of the saltworks in Ebensee am Traunsee in 1604, the entire forestry of the area was oriented toward the production of firewood for the boiling house. About 400 stere of wood were needed per week for salt production in the boiling pans. To protect the forests from overexploitation, foresters were already appointed at that time and forest offices (today district forest inspection) were established. Strict regulations for the removal (quantity, type, and location) of wood were laid down in forest inspection books. The extraction of spruce and fir wood was given high priority, as only these could produce the necessary large-flamed and not too hot fire. The flames of beech wood were too hot for this and could damage the pan bottom. Larches were needed for the pipes of the brine pipelines. All valleys were developed for timber transport, and an ingenious system of check dams was built. The transport of wood from the Kienbachtal on the north side of the mountain was complicated. The wood was first rafted over the Kienbach (Kienklause) to the Attersee and brought to Weißenbach with flatboats. Further transport usually took place in winter with ox-drawn sleds. From the watershed (Umkehrstube), rafting was possible again to the saltworks in Ebensee. To facilitate the work, a hydraulic lift, overcoming a height difference of 50 m, with a subsequent flume was built in 1722. In total, the wood needed four years to reach Ebensee. In 1877, the commissioning of the Salzkammergut Railway enabled the transport of cheaper brown coal from the Hausruck districts, leading to the cessation of wood transport to Ebensee.

=== Hunting ===
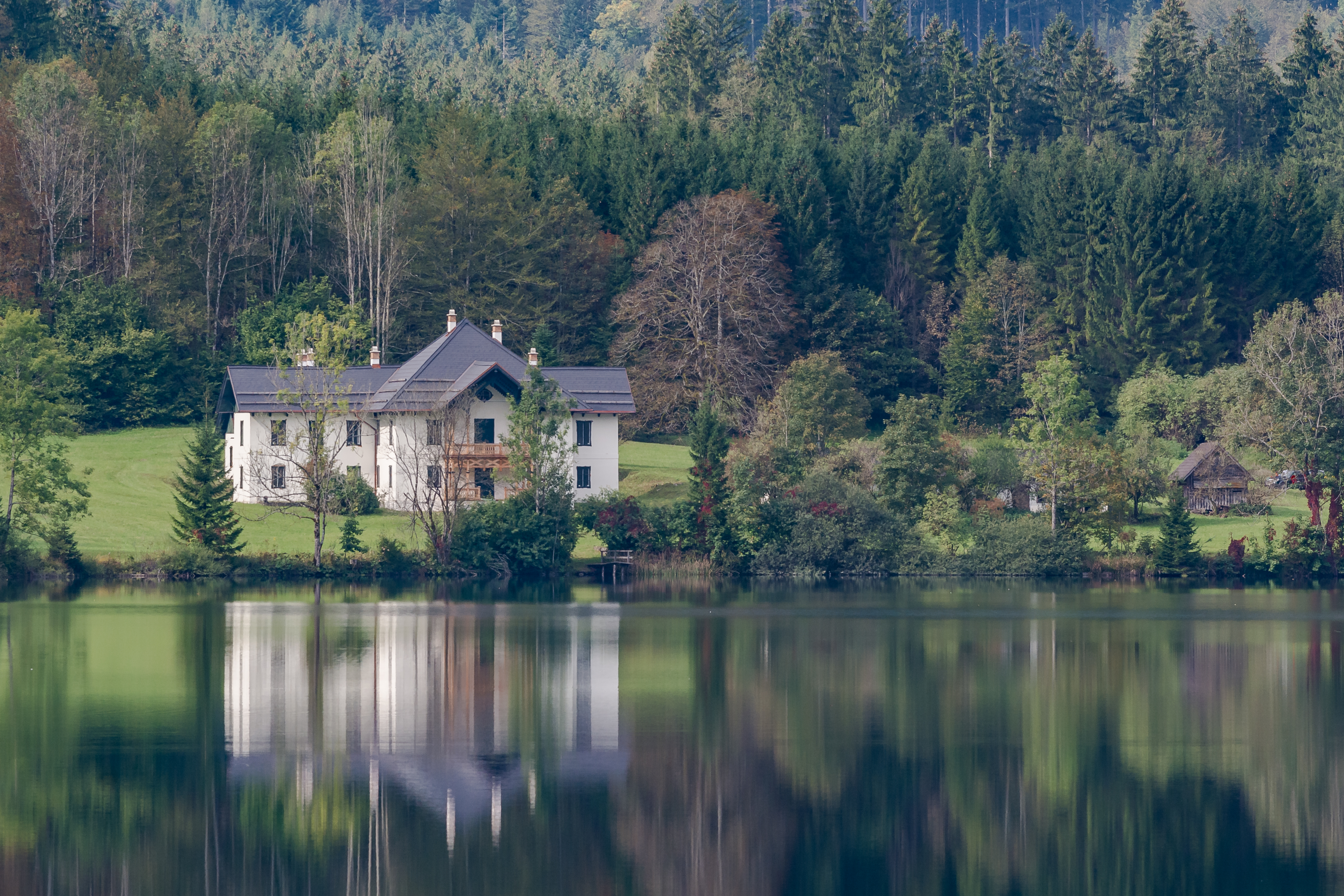
The former imperial hunting lodge stands on the western shore of the Vorderer Langbathsee, 2016

The Höllengebirge is very rich in game. The find of the lance tip of a boar spear on the south slope of the Salzberg near the Brennerin proves that hunting already took place on the plateau in the 17th century. The last brown bear was killed in 1778 in the Aurach cirque. The Höllengebirge was in the court hunting area leased by the imperial house and was one of the preferred territories of Franz Joseph I, whose summer residence was in nearby Bad Ischl. In 1860, Alpine ibex were introduced for hunting. To ensure abundant forage, the mountain pines were cleared on a large scale in the southern slopes of the Elexenkogel, which, however, led to complete karstification. The ibex could not establish themselves in the Höllengebirge, and the last specimen was sighted in 1880. For the Mitterweißenbach district, the game population was given as 300 to 350 pieces of big game and 200 roe deer. Up to 40 chamois and some red deer were shot at the annual Gimbach hunt. Up to 200 beaters were used. In the Helmesriese, on the east side of the Höllengebirge, the emperor shot his two-thousandth chamois. The Jagdhaus Aufzug at the wood lift in the Weißenbachtal was regularly used by the emperor, and there was an imperial hunting hut on the Spitzalm. The hunting lodge of Empress Sissi was at the Vorderer Langbathsee. The court hunting management in Ebensee imposed an absolute entry ban over the central Höllengebirge every summer during the hunting season, and poaching was strictly prosecuted. The last court hunt took place in the Aurachtal on July 23, 1914. Today, hunting administration is the responsibility of the Austrian Federal Forests as owners.

=== Mining ===
Predominantly carbonate-dominated gravel-sand deposits are mined in gravel pits and used as construction raw materials. The most economically significant are the gravel extractions in the Würmian terraces and dam bodies. These are mainly found in the Weißenbachtal. A large extraction was formerly active in the alluvial fan at the Taferlklause below the Bischofsmütze with Hauptdolomit and Steinalm and Wetterstein limestone. Occasionally, wild stream and river gravel is extracted in the Mitterweißenbach and the Äußerer Weißenbach, which is used for construction purposes.

== Settlements ==
The high elevations of the Höllengebirge lie outside the permanent settlement area, so settlement is limited to a few isolated mountain farms and mountain huts. Especially at the Feuerkogel, there is a pronounced tourist infrastructure. Inns, hotels, and a hut village with 13 self-catering huts form a kind of modern scattered settlement in the mountain. Since 1968, the Christopherus Chapel of the Diocese of Linz has stood there.

== The Höllengebirge in art and literature ==
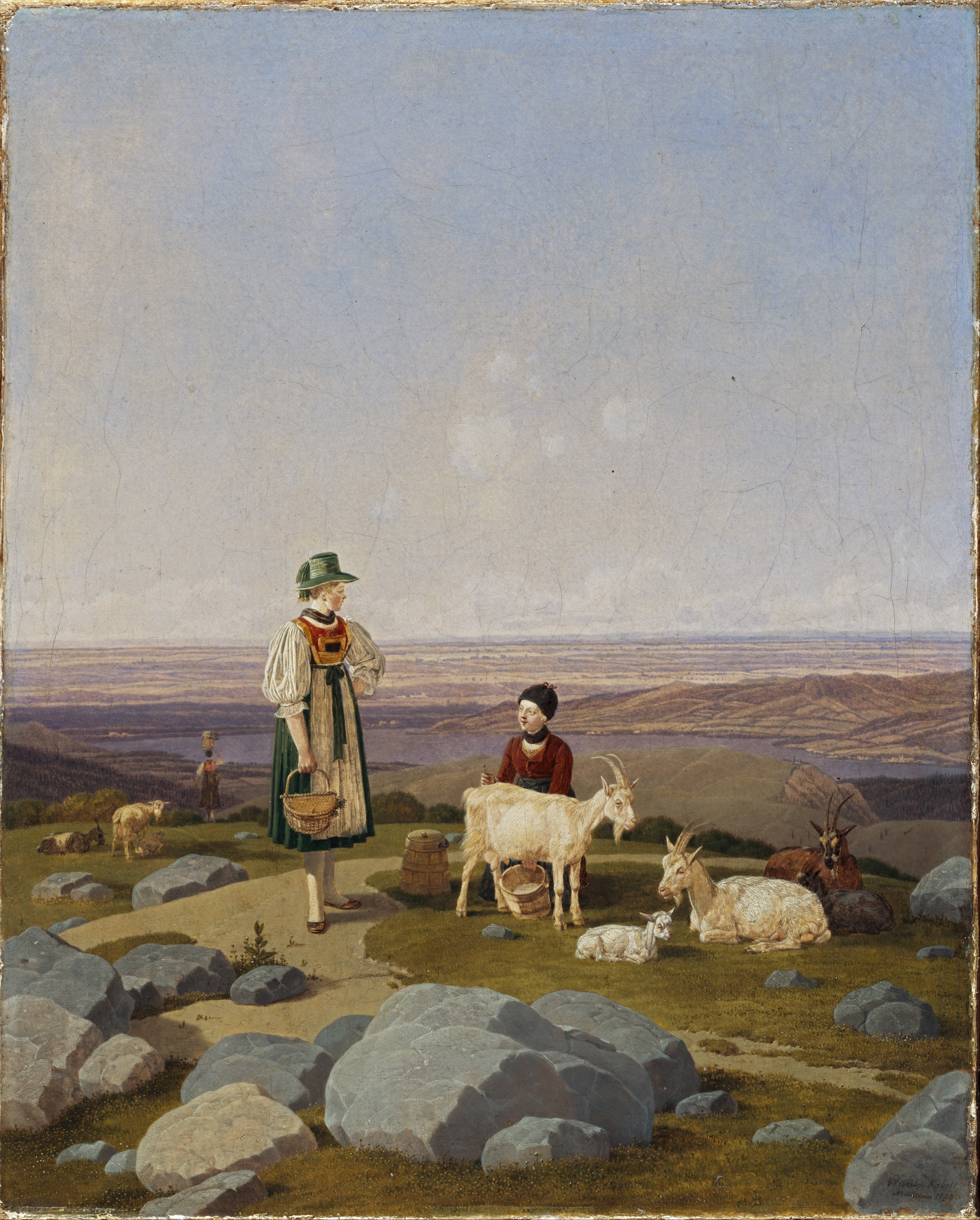
Wilhelm von Kobell:On the Gaisalm, 1828

Near the Geißalm is a rock hole mentioned in the legend as Teufelsjoch (devil's yoke).

In Steinbach am Attersee, a parish cook was so quarrelsome that the devil finally fetched her. Still in the air, she argued with him until he drove with her high up in the Höllengebirge through the mountain and thereby tore open the Teufelsjoch.

— Upper Austrian legend book, sagen.at

Not far from the Hochleckenhaus is the Schatzgräberhöhle (cat. no. 1567/24) at the Goldenes Gatterl, which is also the subject of a folk legend.

Every year, a Wallachian came to a good, poor woodcutter on the Scherhaufenwiese and had himself led by the eldest boy to the Griesalpe to fetch gold there. He always gave the family such rich gifts that they were well off. But the woodcutter was seized by greed; he persuaded the Wallachian to take him to the gold gorge. The Wallachian let him down but threw the rope after him and went away. The woodcutter had a sack of food with him and dug himself with his hands at the Rabenstein into the open air. But his hands had disappeared up to the elbows. The man himself was insane. In lucid moments, he told that deep down there was a golden gate, in front of it a stone table with hammer and chisel. Through the gate one comes to a chamber with gold. The same legend exists about a farmhand from Neukirchen in the Viechtau.

— Upper Austrian legend book, sagen.at

During the Biedermeier period, landscape painters came to the Salzkammergut and the Höllengebirge. Ferdinand Georg Waldmüller, Wilhelm von Kobell, and Friedrich Gauermann created works depicting the Höllengebirge and its surroundings.

Gustav Mahler spent the summer months from 1893 to 1896 at the inn “Zum Höllengebirge” in Seefeld in the municipality of Steinbach am Attersee and was inspired by the landscape of the Höllengebirge and Attersee for his compositions. On a wide meadow in front of the inn, he had a composing hut built on the lakeshore, in which he completed the Second Symphony and composed the Third Symphony in 1895/96. While working on the Third Symphony, he invited his friend Bruno Walter. Upon seeing the Höllengebirge, Mahler said to Walter:

You don't need to look anymore—I've already composed it all away.

== Bibliography ==
- Hans Egger (2007). Geologische Karte der Republik Österreich 1:50 000. Erläuterungen zu Blatt 66 Gmunden [Geological Map of the Republic of Austria 1:50,000. Explanatory Notes to Sheet 66 Gmunden] (PDF). Vienna.
- Gudrun Wallentin; Herta Wallentin (2020). Alpingeschichte kurz und bündig. Steinbach am Attersee [Alpine History in Brief. Steinbach am Attersee] (PDF). Innsbruck.
- Bernd Ruttner (1994). Die Vegetation des Höllengebirges. Stapfia. Vol. 33. Linz.
- Konrad Wiche (1949). "Die Formenentwicklung des Höllengebirges" [The Morphological Development of the Höllengebirge]. Jahrbuch des Oberösterreichischen Musealvereines. 94. Linz: 213–233.
- Franz Dollinger (1998). "Geomorphologie des Höllengebirges" [Geomorphology of the Höllengebirge]. Mitteilungen der Österreichischen Geographischen Gesellschaft. 140. Vienna: 131–160.
- Engelbert Koller (1957). "350 Jahre Salinenort Ebensee" [350 Years of the Salt Works Town Ebensee]. Oberösterreichische Heimatblätter. Linz: 81–96.
- Erich W. Ricek (1989). Die Pilzflora des Attergaues, Hausruck- und Kobernaußerwaldes. Vienna: Self-published by the Zoologisch-Botanische Gesellschaft in Österreich.
- Engelbert Koller (1932). "Das Höllengebirge" (PDF). Jahrbuch des Deutschen und Österreichischen Alpenvereins. 63. Innsbruck: 211–220.
