= Terra fusca =

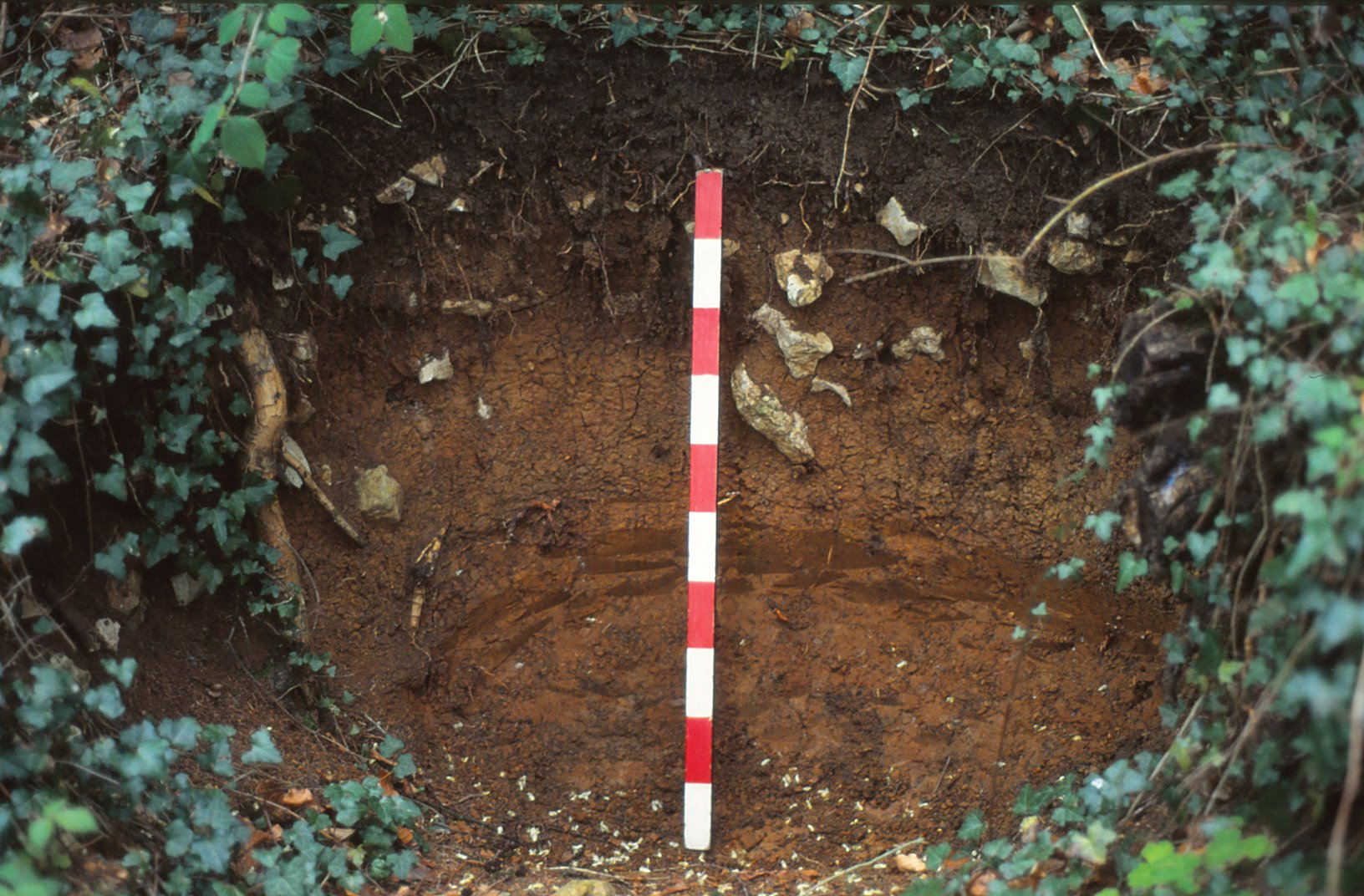
Terra fusca in the Dinkelberg region of Germany

Terra fusca (black earth) is one of the two main soils of the Mediterranean region, the other being terra rossa (red earth). Terra fusca is found mainly in forested areas and has limestone as a key ingredient. It is non-acidic as the limestone cancels any acidity.

It is also referred to as Cromi-calceric cambisol.
