= Mitteilungen der Österreichischen Geographischen Gesellschaft =

- Discipline: Geography
- Language: English, German
- Edited by: Peter Jordan

Publication details
- History: 1857-present
- Publisher: Austrian Geographical Society (Austria)
- Frequency: Annually
- Impact factor: 0.269 (2014)

Standard abbreviations
- ISO 4: Mitt. Österr. Geogr. Ges.

Indexing
- ISSN: 0029-9138 (print); 0029-9138 (web)
- LCCN: 63056970
- OCLC no.: 5357492

Links
- Journal homepage; Online access

Mitteilungen der Österreichischen Geographischen Gesellschaft (English: Annals of the Austrian Geographical Society) is a peer-reviewed scientific journal covering all aspects of geography, regionally often focusing on Central and Eastern Europe and the former areas of Austria-Hungary.

== Overview ==
The journal was established by the Austrian Geographical Society in 1857 as Mitteilungen der k.k. Geographischen Gesellschaft in Wien (English: Annals of the Imperial-Royal Geographical Society at Vienna). It has been published annually since then. Articles are published in either English or German.

== Abstracting and indexing ==
The journal is abstracted and indexed in the Social Sciences Citation Index. According to the Journal Citation Reports, the journal has a 2014 impact factor of 0.269.
