= Taferlklaussee =

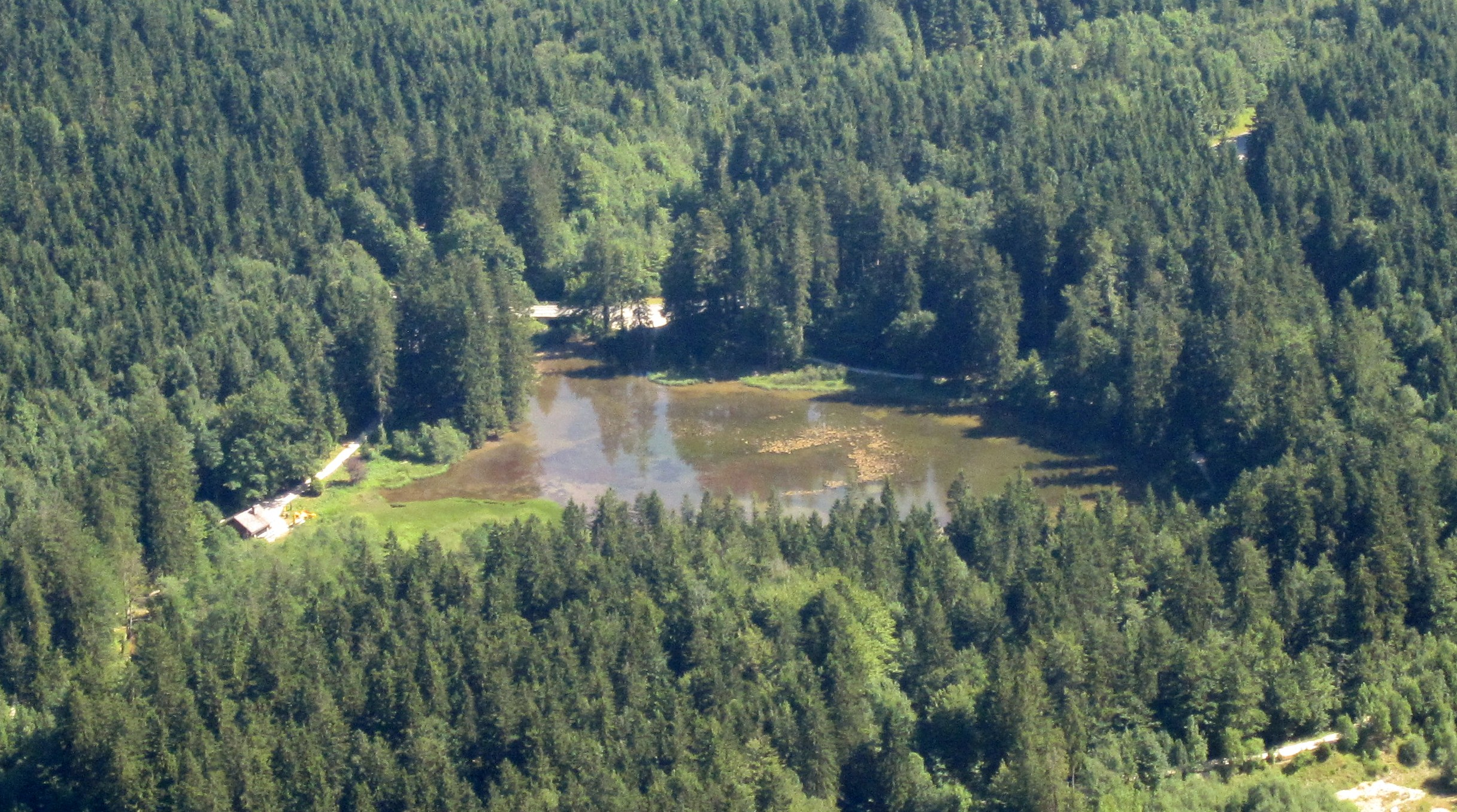
- Taferlklaussee seen from Aurachkar

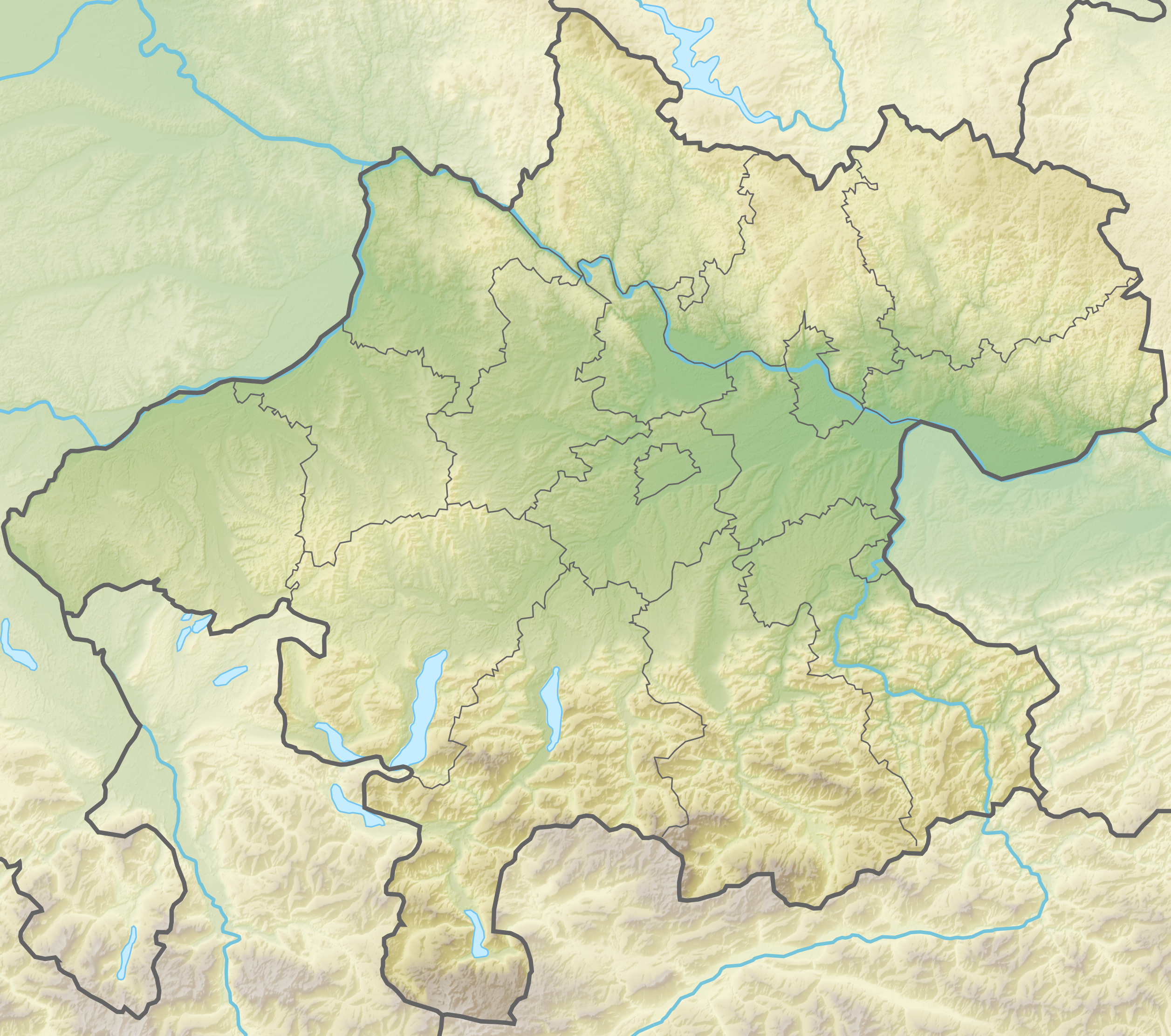
- Location in Upper Austria
- Location: Altmünster, Upper Austria, Austria
- Coordinates: 47°50′34″N 13°37′37″E
- Type: Reservoir (Klausteich)
- Primary inflows: Aurach
- Primary outflows: Aurach
- Basin countries: Austria
- Max. length: 170 m (560 ft)
- Max. width: 80 m (260 ft)
- Surface elevation: 765 m (2,510 ft)

Taferlklaussee is a small artificial lake at about 763–800 m above sea level in the municipality of Altmünster, Upper Austria.

The reservoir originated in 1716, when a Klausmauer (log-driving dam) was built on the Aurach to supply timber transport for the Ebensee saltworks. By opening the sluice, a surge of water could drive firewood down to the Nádasdy-Klause on the lower Aurach and further along the Traun river.

Since 2000 the lake and its surroundings have been designated as the Naturschutzgebiet Taferlklaussee mit seiner Umgebung (nature reserve no. N039), covering about 8.5 ha of bog and riparian woodland. Bathing and fishing are prohibited to protect the sensitive vegetation.

== Geography and hydrology ==
Taferlklaussee lies on the north side of the Höllengebirge in the municipality of Altmünster, directly beside the Großalmstraße (L544) between Traunsee and Attersee. The lake is impounded on the upper course of the Aurach stream, which both flows into and out of the lake. Its water level is around 763 m above sea level; the wider setting is commonly described as “about 800 m”.
