= Uvala =

Uvala Увала
- Village
- Location within Bosnia and Herzegovina
- Coordinates: 44°26′57″N 16°33′28″E
- Country: Bosnia and Herzegovina
- Entity: Republika Srpska
- Municipality: Istočni Drvar

Area
  - Total: 7.94 sq mi (20.57 km^{2})

Population (2013)
  - Total: 38
  - Density: 4.8/sq mi (1.8/km^{2})
- Time zone: UTC+1 (CET)
  - Summer (DST): UTC+2 (CEST)

Uvala (Serbian Cyrillic: Увала) is a village in the municipality of Istočni Drvar (East Drvar), Bosnia and Herzegovina.

== Demographics ==
According to the 2013 census, its population was 38, all Serbs.
