= Byala reka (Stryama tributary) =

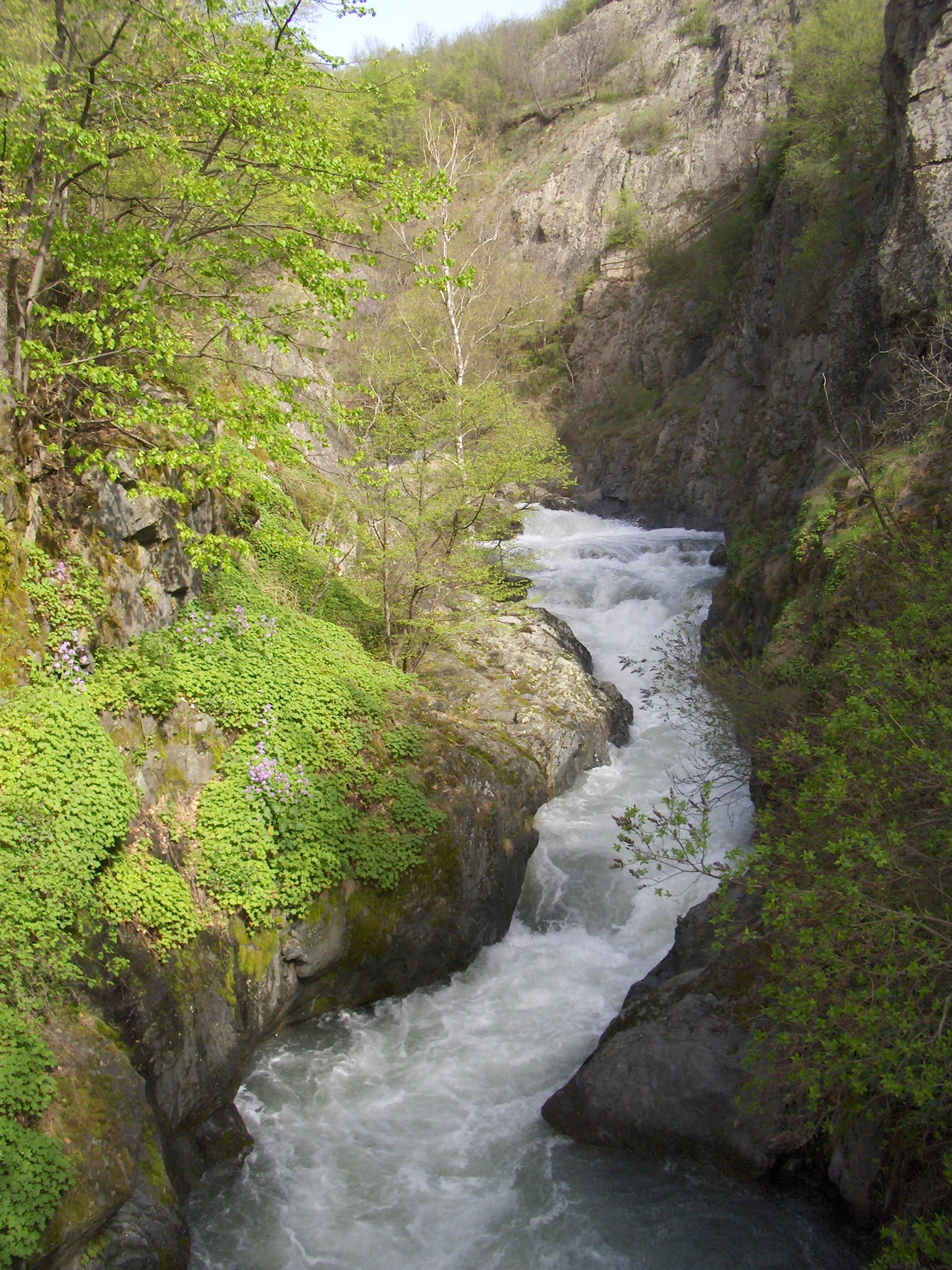

Location
- Country: Bulgaria

Physical characteristics
- Source
  - location: W of Botev Peak, Balkan Mountains
  - coordinates: 42°43′8.04″N 24°54′11.88″E
  - elevation: 2,048 m (6,719 ft)
- Mouth
  - location: Stryama
  - coordinates: 42°30′48.96″N 24°50′44.88″E
  - elevation: 268 m (879 ft)
- Length: 37 km (23 mi)
- Basin size: 239 km^{2} (92 sq mi)

Basin features
- Progression: Stryama→ Maritsa

The Byala reka (Bulgarian: Бяла река) is a river in southern Bulgaria, a left tributary of the river Stryama of the Maritsa drainage, with a length of 37 km. Its upper course falls within the Dzhendema nature reserve of the Central Balkan National Park.

== Geography ==
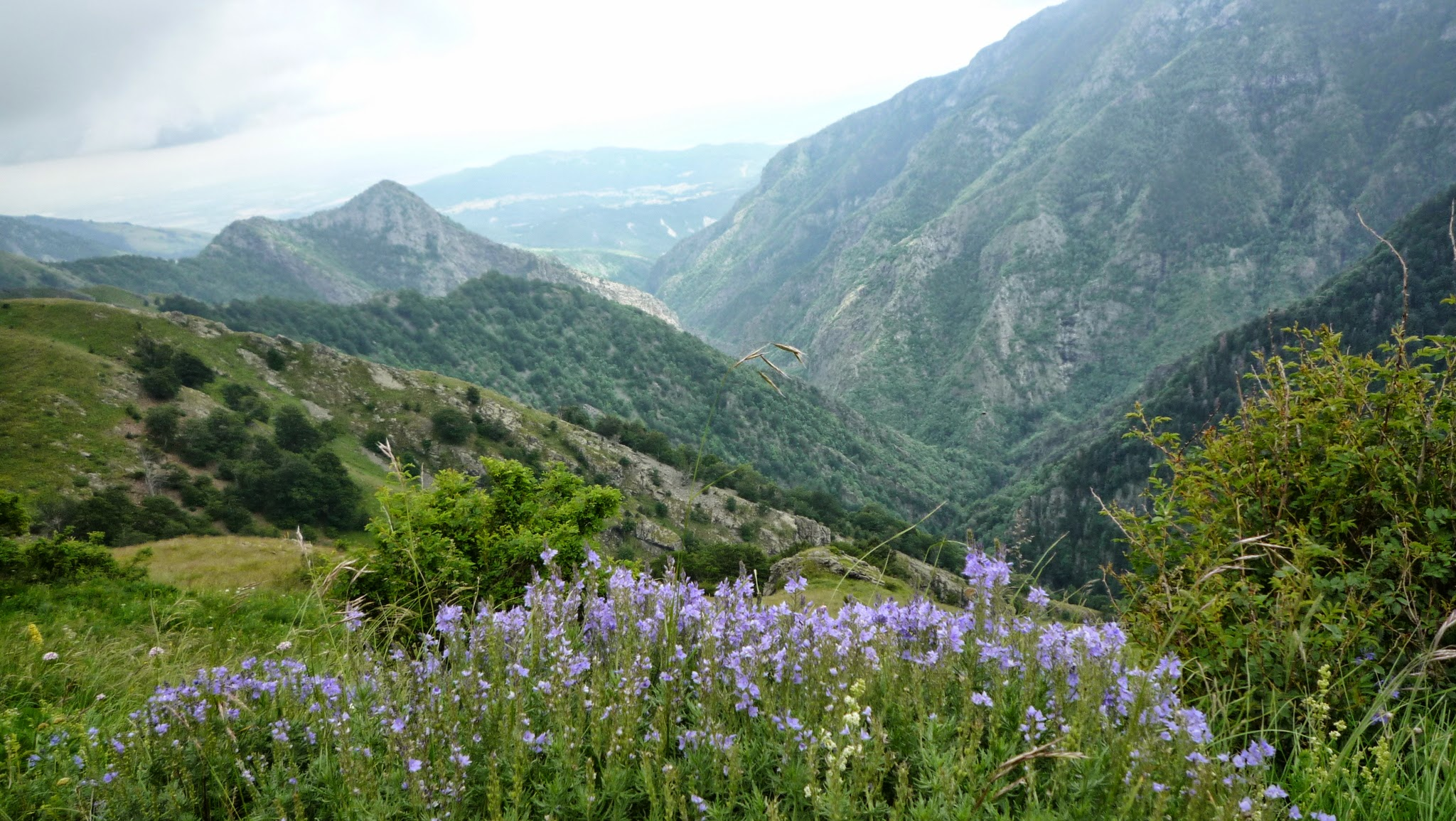
The valley of Byala reka

The Byala reka takes its source at an altitude of 2,048 m in the Kalofer division of the Balkan Mountains, at the western foothills of the summit of Botev (2,376 m), the highest in the mountain range. It flows initially south and then southeast in a steep valley, which along with its tributaries the Dzhendemska reka and the Praskalska reka form the deep impenetrable valley of Southern Dzhendem. After it receives the waters of the Dzhendemska reka, its flow increases significantly. Downstream of the confluence with the Bazovitsa the terrain becomes less undulated and the river again turns southwards.

North of the town of Kalofer in a small valley extension is located the Kalofer Monastery. Less than a kilometer west of Kalofer, the Byala reka turns west and at the village of Kurtovo enters the Karlovo Valley. There the river bends to the southwest and flows in to the Stryama at an altitude of 268 m upstream of the Stryama Gorge.

Its drainage basin covers a territory of 239 km^{2} or 17.1% of the Stryama's total. The river a number of tributaries, mostly flowing from the Balkan Mountains, such as the Dzhendemska reka and the Praskalska reka. Its largest tributary the Svezhenska reka (26 km) takes its source from Sredna Gora.

The Byala reka has predominantly snow–rain feed with high water in March–June and low water in July–October. The average annual flow is at the village of Kurtovo is 1.58 m^{3}/s.

== Settlements and tourism ==
The river flows entirely in Karlovo Municipality of Plovdiv Province. There are four villages along its course, Kurtovo, Verdare, Beguntsi and Prolom. Its waters are utilised for irrigation and industrial supple in the Karlovo Valley. A 3.3 km stretch of the first class I-6 road Gyueshevo–Sofia–Karlovo–Burgas follows its valley west of Kalofer.

The upper valley of Byala reka and its tributaries is known for its pristine nature and offers favourable conditions for tourism and family recreation. There are dozens of waterfalls along the river and some of its tributaries, the most notable being the Raysko Praskalo, which at 124.5 m is the highest permanent waterfall in Bulgaria and the Balkan Peninsula. The 1.83 km eco-trail “Byala reka” beginning at the Kalofer Monastery winds around part of its course.
