= Raysko Praskalo =

Coordinates: 42.711936°N 24.924440°E

- Райско пръскало
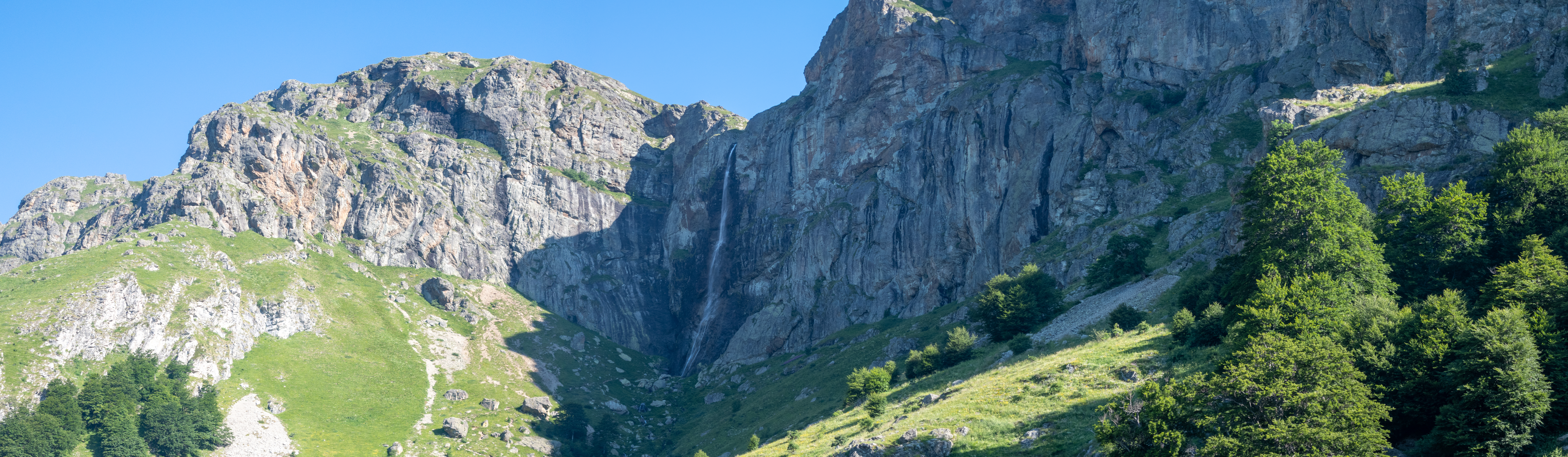
- View to the waterfall from Ray mountain refuge
- Interactive map of Raysko Praskalo
- Location: Balkan Mountains, Bulgaria
- Type: Plunge
- Total height: 124.5
- Number of drops: 1

Raysko Praskalo (Bulgarian: Райско пръскало, "Heavenly Sprinkler"), 124.5 m in height, is the highest permanent waterfall in Bulgaria and probably in the Balkan Peninsula. It is a popular tourist destination. The waterfall is among the 100 Tourist Sites of Bulgaria of the Bulgarian Tourist Union.

== Geography ==
It is situated at an altitude of 1,700 m under Botev Peak (2,376 m) in the central section of the Balkan Mountains. The waterfall lies in the Dzhendema Reserve of the Central Balkan National Park and has been declared a natural landmark in 1965. The nearest town is Kalofer at 11 km to the south; in clear weather it can be seen from the town. Administratively, it is part of Plovdiv Province.

Raysko Praskalo takes water from the snow drifts on Botev Peak and forms the river Praskalska which is a tributary to the Byala рeka, itself a left tributary of the Stryama of the Maritsa drainage. After flowing southeast for some 500–600 m along the gentle grassy slope of the summit, the Praskalska reaches the upper edge of a rocky escarpment of sheer cliffs, called the Paradise Rocks, where it plunges into the abyss of the Southern Dzhendem. The flow of fall is at its peak during summer.

On the foothills of Raysko Praskalo at an altitude of 1,435 m is located the 120-bed Ray mountain refuge which is the starting point for the tourist trails to the waterfall. Its surrounding are dramatic, with sheer rocks, caves, meadows, and other waterfalls. The cliffs attract many rock climbing enthusiasts, while the waterfall itself is a popular destination for recreational tourism.

== Gallery ==
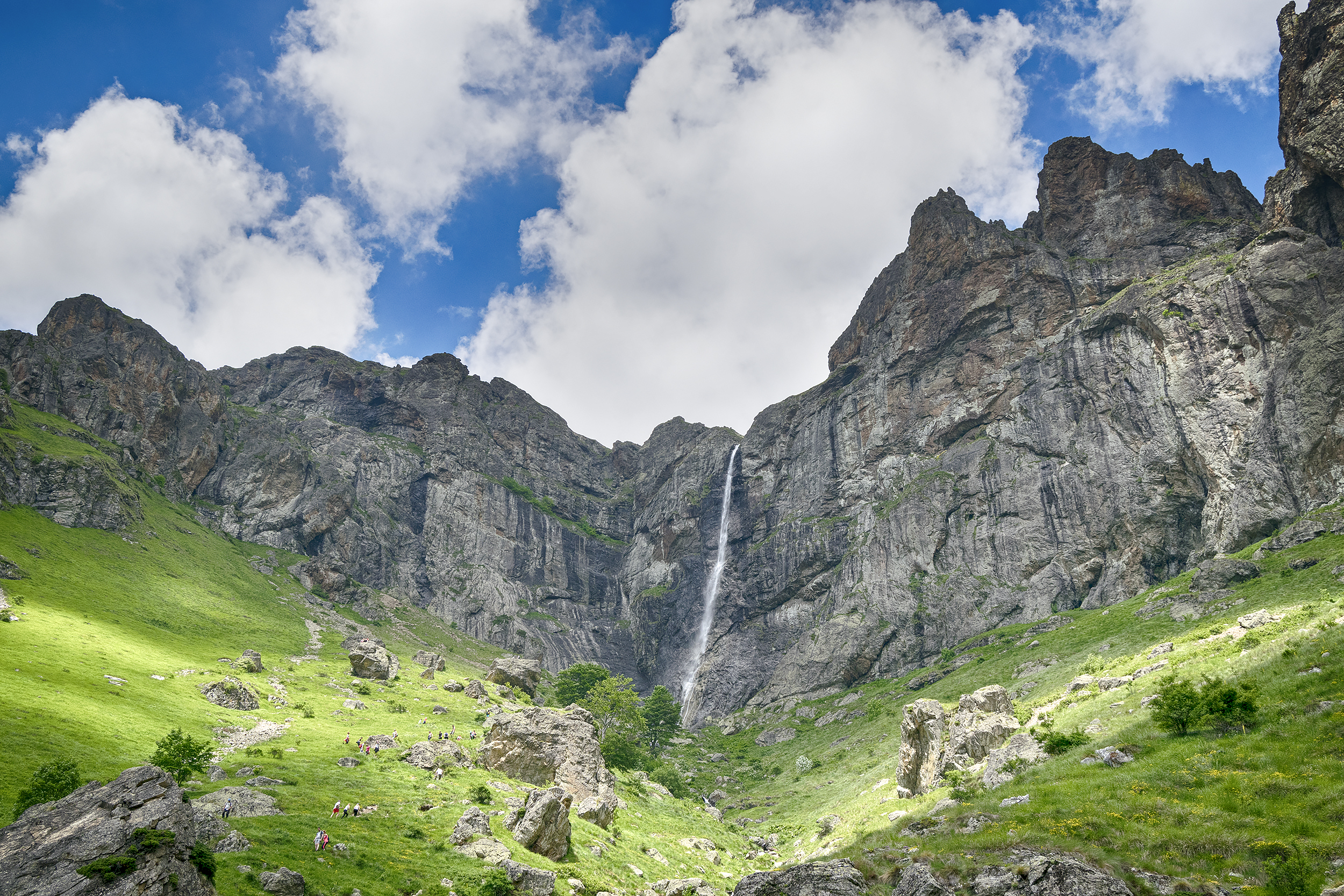

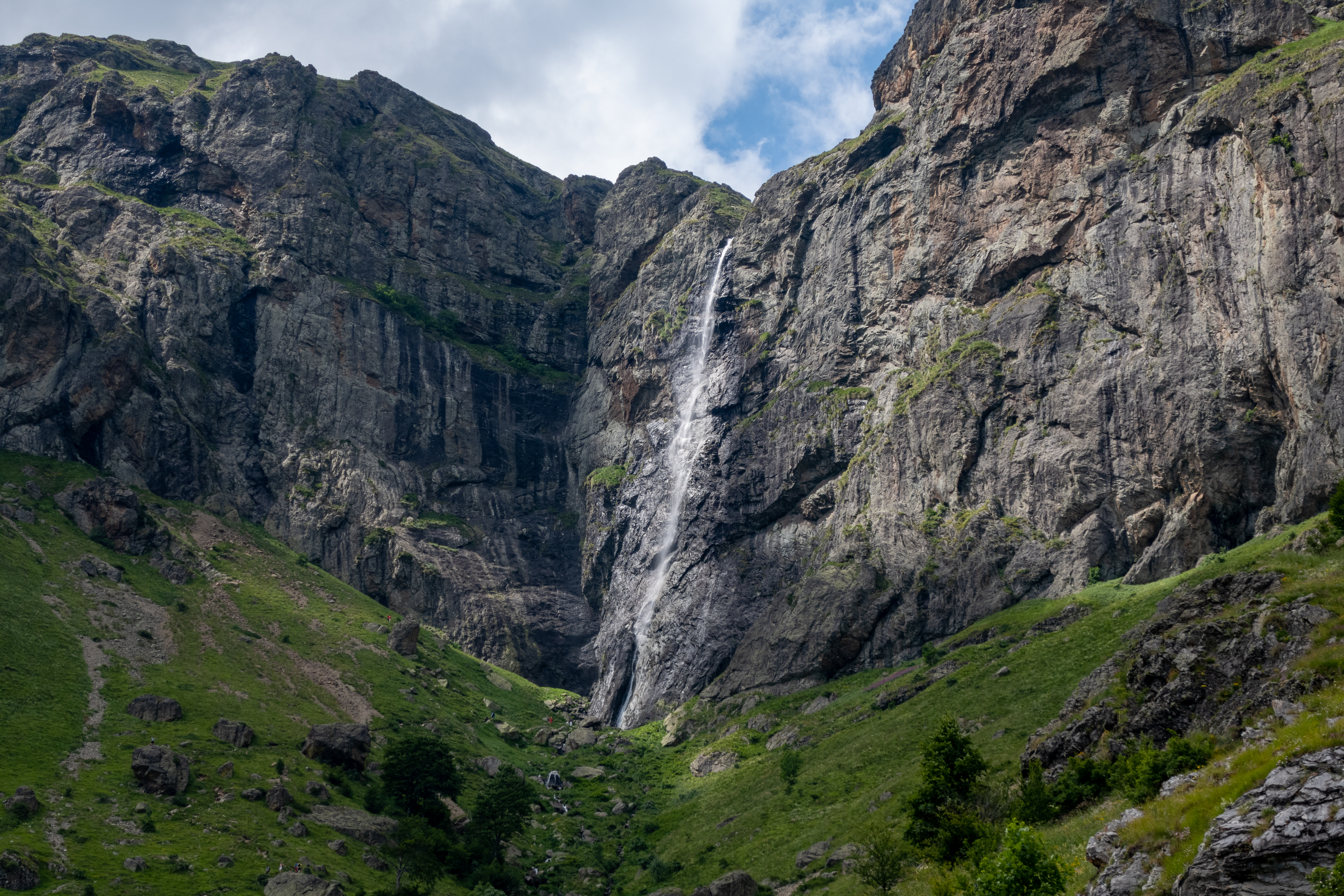

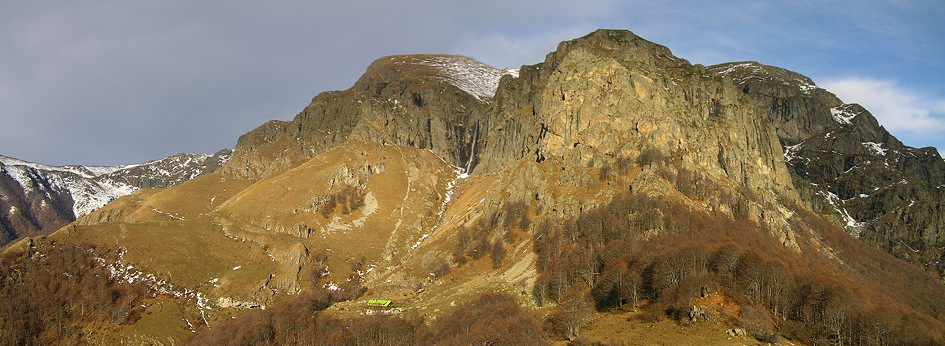

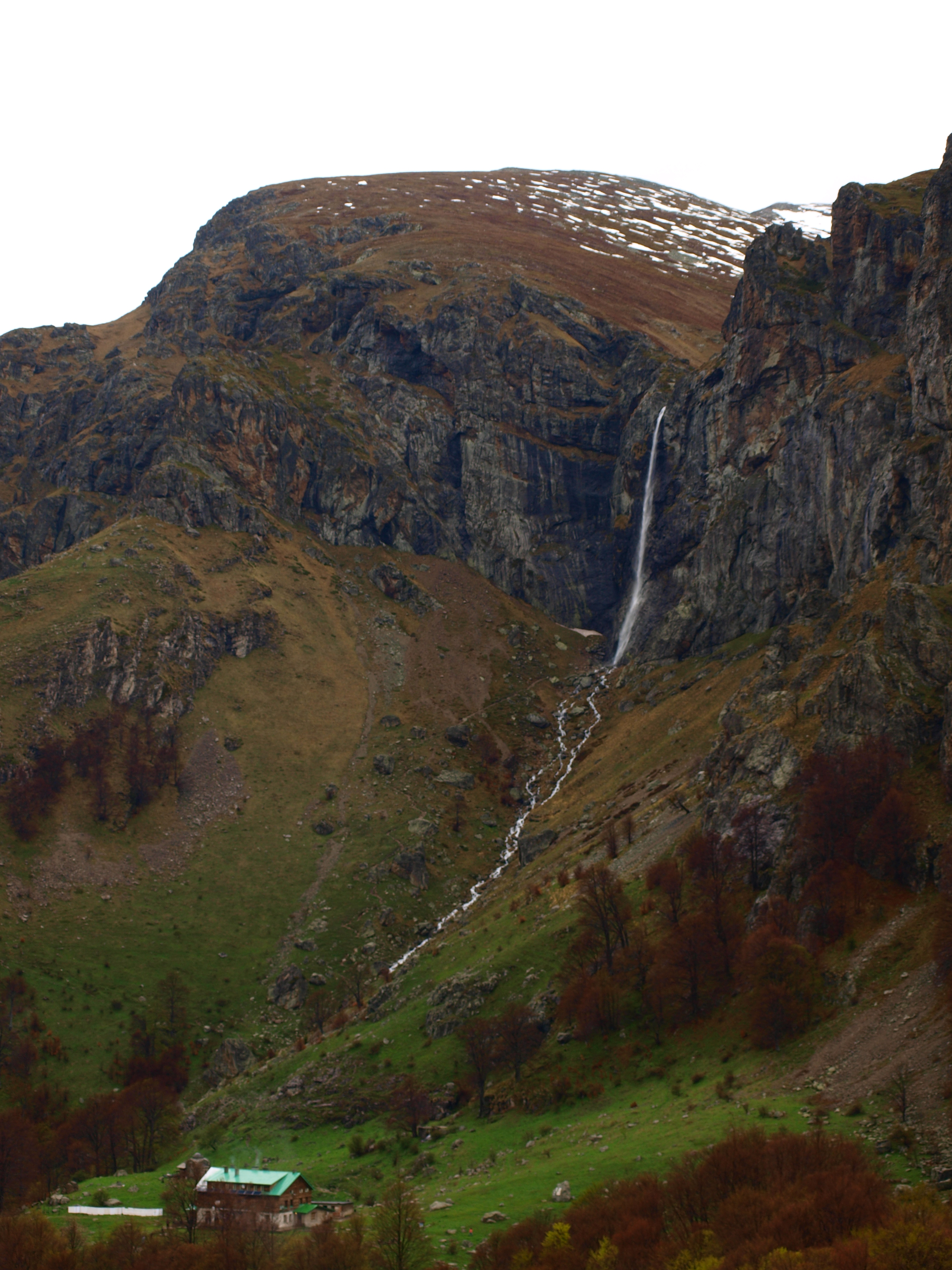

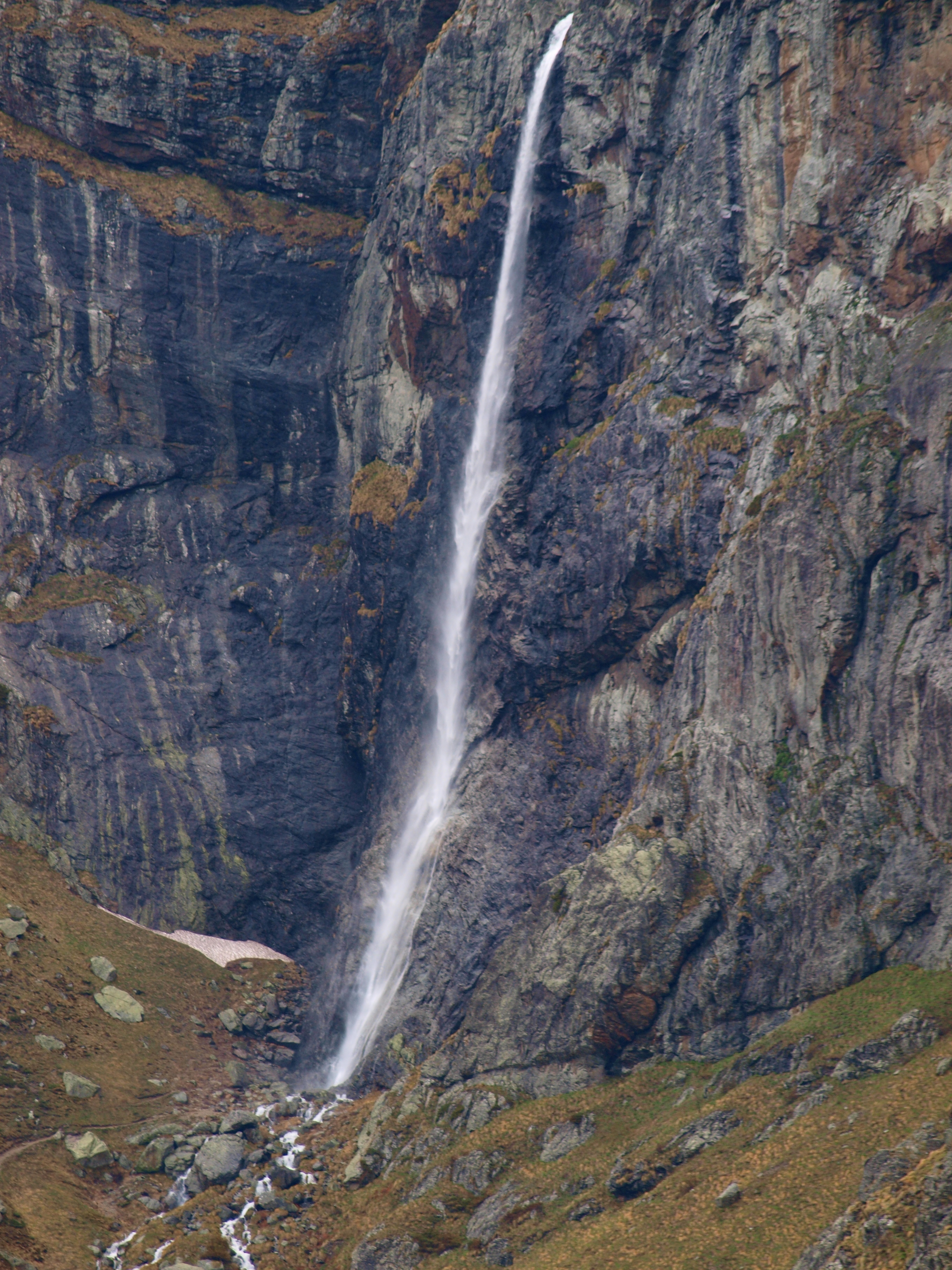

== See also ==
- List of waterfalls
