= Boatin Reserve =

Nature reserve in Bulgaria

- IUCN category Ia (strict nature reserve)
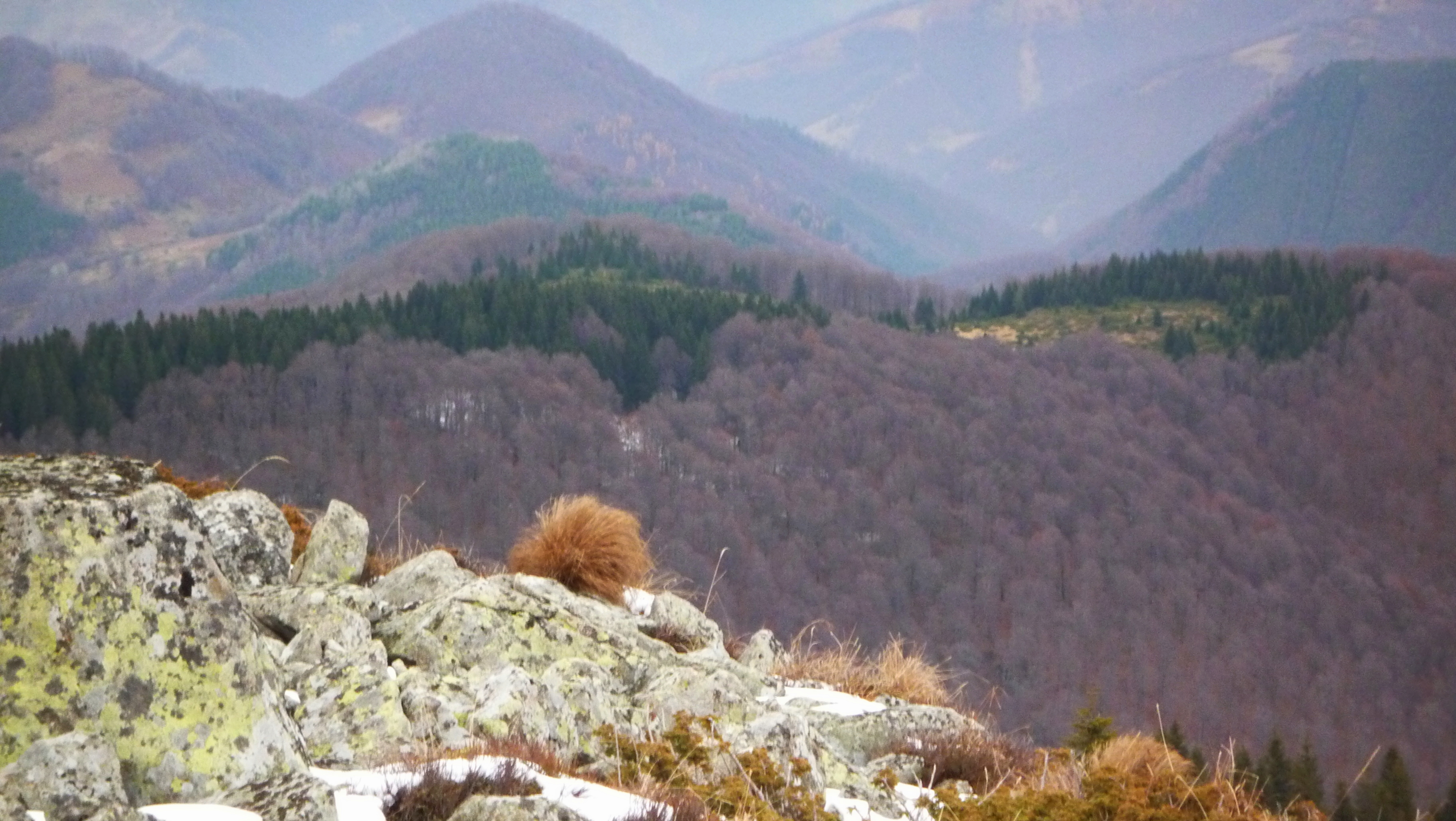

- Location within Bulgaria
- Location: Teteven Municipality, Lovech Province, Bulgaria
- Nearest city: Teteven
- Coordinates: 42°48′10″N 24°16′9″E
- Area: 15.97 km^{2} (6.17 sq mi)
- Established: 1948
- Governing body: Ministry of Environment and Water

Boatin (Bulgarian: Боатин) is a nature reserve in Central Balkan National Park, located in the Balkan Mountains of central Bulgaria. It spans a territory of 1597 ha or 15.97 km^{2} and was declared in June 1948 to protect old-growth beech forests. Boatin was declared a UNESCO Biosphere Reserve in 1977, and since 2016 the whole national park was added in the programme. It is a strict nature reserve (1st category protected territory according to Bulgarian legislation and IUCN classification).

== Geography ==
Boatin is the westernmost of the nine reserves of the Central Balkan National Park and is located north of the summit of Tetevenska Baba (2,071 m), spanning several small valleys that form the source of the Cherni Vit, one of the two main stems of the river Vit, an important Bulgarian tributary of the Danube. The reserve is situated at altitudes between 800 m and 1,950 m. The territory is rugged, steep and difficult to traverse. Administratively, it is part of Teteven Municipality, Lovech Province, within the area of the village of Divchovo and some 15 km from the village of Cherni Vit.

== Flora ==
Almost the entire area of Boatin is forested, the most important being the well preserved old-growth woods of European beech (Fagus sylvatica) that cover its lower altitude zones or 82% of its territory. The beech forests are 130 years old in average, with some trees reaching age over 220 years and height over 40–50 m. Other deciduous trees include European hornbeam (Carpinus betulus), Norway maple (Acer platanoides), Heldreich's maple (Acer heldreichii), common aspen (Populus tremula), etc. At higher altitudes there are coniferous forests of Norway spruce (Picea abies) and European silver fir (Abies alba), as well as the only compact population of dwarf mountain pine (Pinus mugo) in the Balkan Mountains.

The number of vascular plant species is about 600, including rare and endemic plants, such as Carex tricolor, Seseli bulgaricum, Campanula moesiaca, Ostericum palustre, etc.

== Fauna ==
The fauna of the reserve is diverse, with a number of rare species of conversational importance. Among the resident mammals are brown bear, gray wolf, red fox, European wildcat, beech marten, European pine marten, wild boar, red deer, roe deer and others. There are 64 species of nesting birds, such as peregrine falcon, Eurasian eagle-owl, boreal owl, Ural owl, white-backed woodpecker, black woodpecker, semicollared flycatcher, red-breasted flycatcher, etc. The presence of the Ural owl in Bulgaria was first recorded in Boatin. The river trout is found in the streams.
