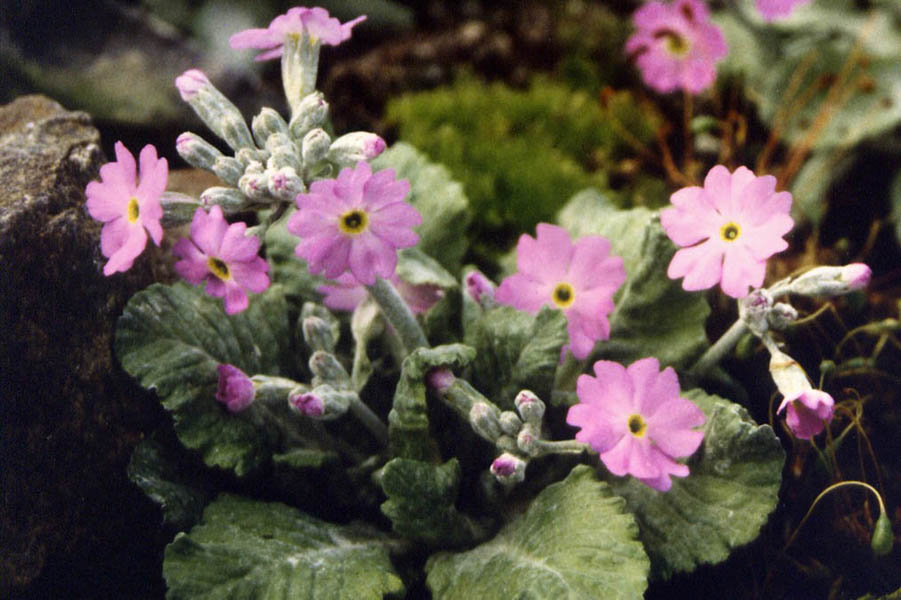

Conservation status
- Data Deficient (IUCN 3.1)

Scientific classification
- Kingdom: Plantae
- Clade: Tracheophytes
- Clade: Angiosperms
- Clade: Eudicots
- Clade: Asterids
- Order: Ericales
- Family: Primulaceae
- Genus: Primula
- Species: P. frondosa

Binomial name
- Primula frondosa Janka

= Primula frondosa =

Species of flowering plant

Primula frondosa, the leafy primrose (Bulgarian: Старопланинска иглика), is a species of flowering plant in the family Primulaceae, native to the Balkans. It inhabits shady spots in a small region of the central Balkan Mountains range in Bulgaria, where it is found at altitudes from 800 to 2,200 m (2,620 to 7,220 ft). Its populations are situated within the boundaries of the Central Balkan National Park and the nature reserves Sokolna, Dzhendema and Stara Reka.

Growing to 27 cm (11 in) tall by 10 cm (3.9 in) broad, it is a short-lived herbaceous perennial with a rosette of leaves surrounding the central stem. The leaves are covered in a mealy, flour-like substance (farinose). In spring, the plant bears loose umbels of pink flowers with a prominent yellow eye.

In cultivation in the United Kingdom, P. frondosa has been given the Royal Horticultural Society's Award of Garden Merit. It grows well in acidic soils, in similar conditions to those of its cool alpine home.
