= Karlovsko Praskalo =

Coordinates: 42°42′36″N 24°51′11″E

- Карловско пръскало
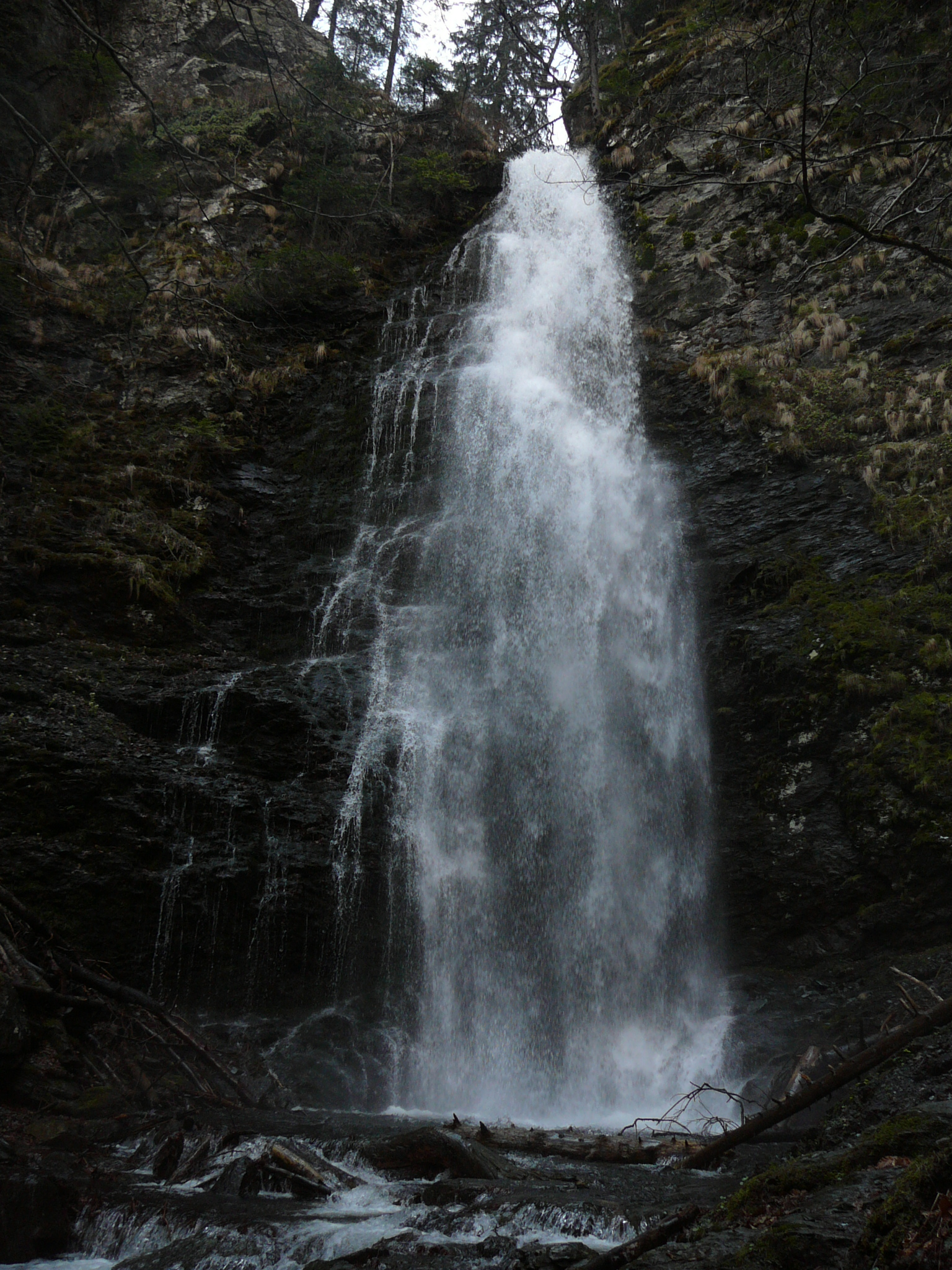
- Karlovsko Praskalo Waterfall
- Interactive map of Karlovsko Praskalo
- Location: Balkan Mountains, Bulgaria
- Type: Plunge
- Total height: 30

Karlovsko Praskalo (Bulgarian: Карловско пръскало) is a waterfall in the Central Balkan National Park, Balkan Mountains, central Bulgaria. It is located at 1,450 m altitude in the southern slope of the Zhaltets Peak. The waterfall is 30 m high. Karlovsko Praskalo and the surrounding area was declared a natural landmark in 1965.

== See also ==
- List of waterfalls
