= Vrashka Chuka =

Mountain peak in Serbia and Bulgaria

- Vrška čuka
- Location within Bulgaria

Highest point
- Elevation: 692 m (2,270 ft)
- Coordinates: 43°50′05″N 22°22′09″E

Geography
- Location: Bulgaria / Serbia
- Parent range: Balkan Mountains

Vrashka Chuka (Bulgarian: Връшка чука [ˈvrɤʃkɐ ˈt͡ʃukɐ]) or Vrška čuka (Serbian Cyrillic: Вршка чука, [ʋr̩̂ːʃkaː t͡ʃûka]) is a peak in the Balkan Mountains, situated on the border between Bulgaria and Serbia in southeastern Europe. The peak is 692 metres (2,270 ft) high. Vrashka Chuka is the most northwestern peak in the Balkan mountains and part of Babin Nos mountain. Vrashka Chuka Pass is located to the north of the peak. There is a border checkpoint between Bulgaria and Serbia in the pass. The closest towns to the peak are Kula to the northeast and Zaječar to the northwest.
