= Vratnik Pass (Bulgaria) =

- Interactive map of Vratnik Pass
- Elevation: 940 m (3,080 ft)
- Traversed by: Road

Location
- Location: Bulgaria
- Range: Balkan Mountains
- Coordinates: 42°49′15″N 26°9′53″E

Vratnik Pass is a mountain pass in the Balkan Mountains (Stara Planina) in Bulgaria. It connects Elena and Sliven.
