= Dyulino Pass =

- Interactive map of Dyulino Pass
- Elevation: 440 m (1,440 ft)
- Traversed by: Cherno More motorway (A3) (planned)

Location
- Location: Bulgaria
- Range: Balkan Mountains
- Coordinates: 42°49′29″N 27°37′46″E

Dyulino Pass is a mountain pass in the Balkan Mountains (Stara Planina) in eastern Bulgaria. It connects Varna and Aitos.
