= Balkan Mountains =

Mountain range in southeastern Europe

Balkan Mountains Stara Planina
- Haemus Mons
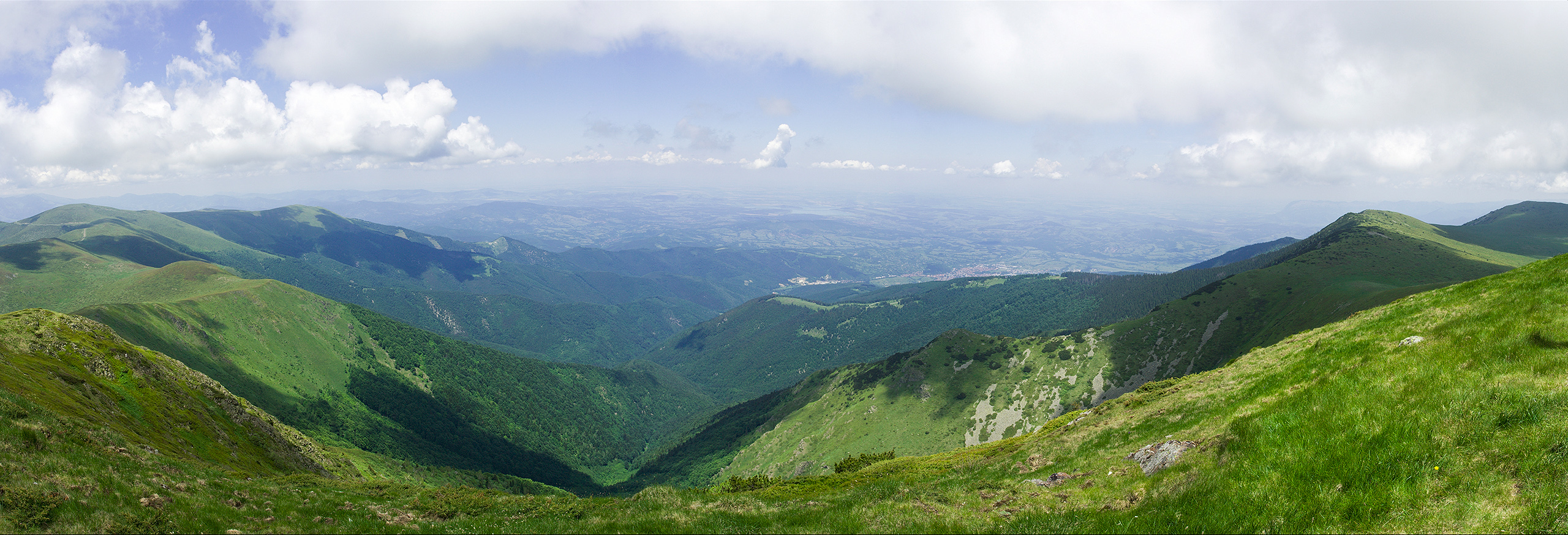
- A view from Kom Peak in western Bulgaria

Highest point
- Peak: Botev Peak
- Elevation: 2,376 m (7,795 ft)
- Listing: List of mountain ranges
- Coordinates: 42°43′02″N 24°55′02″E

Dimensions
- Length: 557 km (346 mi) west-east
- Width: 15–50 km (9.3–31.1 mi) north-south
- Area: 11,596 km^{2} (4,477 mi^{2})

Naming
- Native name: Стара планина (Bulgarian); Стара планина / Stara planina (Serbian); Балкан (Bulgarian); Балкан / Balkan (Serbian)
- English translation: 'Old Mountain'

Geography
- Countries: Bulgaria; Serbia
- Range coordinates: 43°15′N 25°0′E

Geology
- Rock types: granite; gneiss; limestone

The Balkan mountain range is located in the eastern part of the Balkan Peninsula in Southeastern Europe. It is conventionally taken to begin at the peak of Vrashka Chuka on the border between Bulgaria and Serbia. It then runs for about 560 kilometres (350 mi), first in a south-easterly direction along the border, then eastward across Bulgaria, forming a natural barrier between the northern and southern halves of the country, before finally reaching the Black Sea at Cape Emine. The mountains reach their highest point with Botev Peak at 2,376 metres (7,795 ft).

In much of the central and eastern sections, the summit forms the watershed between the drainage basins of the Black Sea and the Aegean. A prominent gap in the mountains is formed by the predominantly narrow Iskar Gorge, a few miles north of the Bulgarian capital, Sofia. The karst relief determines the large number of caves, including Magura, featuring the most important and extended European post-Palaeolithic cave painting, Ledenika, Saeva dupka, Bacho Kiro, etc. The most notable rock formation are the Belogradchik Rocks in the west.

There are several important protected areas: Central Balkan National Park, Vrachanski Balkan, Bulgarka, and Sinite Kamani, as well as a number of nature reserves. The Balkan Mountains are remarkable for their flora and fauna. Edelweiss grows there in the region of Kozyata stena. Some of the most striking landscapes are included in the Central Balkan National Park with steep cliffs, the highest waterfalls in the Balkans and lush vegetation. There are a number of important nature reserves such as Chuprene, Kozyata stena and others. Most of Europe's large mammals inhabit the area including the brown bear, wolf, boar, chamois and deer.

The mountains are the source of the name of the Balkans (sometimes considered as a distinct peninsula or region). In Bulgarian and Serbian the mountains are known as Стара планина Stara planina (pronounced in Bulgarian as [ˈstarɐ pɫɐniˈna] and in Serbian as [stâːraː planǐna]), a term whose literal meaning is 'old mountain'.

== Etymology ==
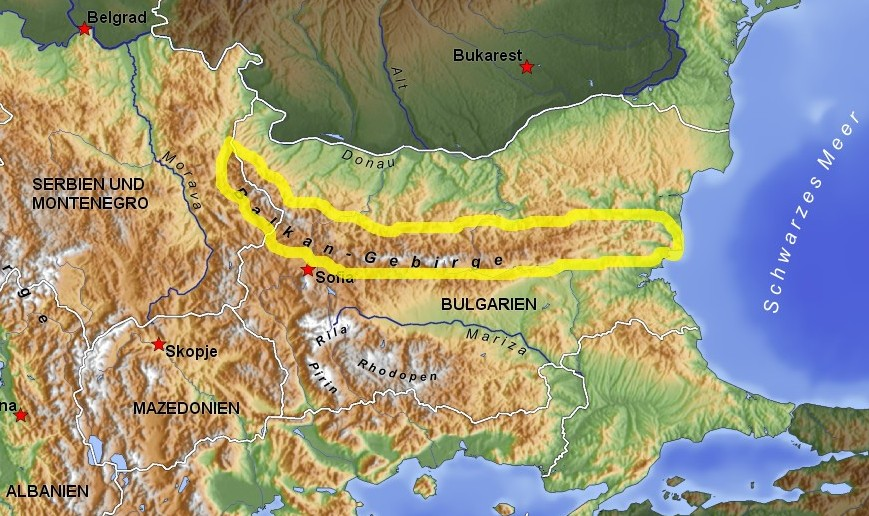
Balkan Mountains, Rhodope, Rila and Pirin Mountains

It is widely believed this name was brought to the region by the Ottoman Turks but it may have ultimately derived from the Persian bālkāneh or bālākhāna, meaning "high, above, or proud house". In Bulgarian, the archaic word balkan (балкан) was borrowed from Turkish and means "mountain". The name is still preserved in Central Asia with the Balkan Daglary (Balkan Mountains) and the Balkan Province of Turkmenistan.

In Antiquity and the Middle Ages the mountains were known as Haemus (Αἷμος), derived from a Thracian word *saimon, 'mountain ridge'. The name of the place where the range meets the Black Sea, Cape Emine, is derived from Aemon.

There are two different folk etymologies for the name Haemus, derived from ancient Greek mythology. One suggests that the name 'Haemus' comes from the Greek word haima (αἵμα), meaning "blood", based on the myth of the battle between Zeus and the monster/titan Typhon. The other attributes the name to King Haemus. See the Mythology section below for more details.

Other names used to refer to the mountains in different time periods include Aemon, Haemimons, Hem, Emus, the Slavonic Matorni gori and the Turkish Kocabalkan.

The modern Slavic name "Stara Planina" was first attested at the beginning of the 16th century by Antun Vrančić.

== Mythology ==
According to the mythology, the origin of the range is that King Haemus and his wife Rhodope were transformed into mountains, Haemus Mons (now known as the Balkan Mountains) and the Rhodope Mountains respectively, for daring to call themselves Zeus and Hera.

Another myth states that during the clash between Typhon and Zeus, Typhon hurled entire mountains at the god, but Zeus deflected them with his thunderbolts, causing Typhon's blood to spill across the land. The mountain was named Haemus after this event, as the Greek word haima (αἷμα) means "blood".

== Geography ==
The Balkan Mountains are, technically, a chain of fold mountains—mountains formed by the compression and breaking of layers of rock. On a geological time scale, they are a rather young and recently formed part of the Alp-Himalayan chain which stretches across most of Eurasia. The Balkan Mountains can be divided into two parts—the main Balkan Chain and the Pre-Balkans (Fore-Balkan) to the north, which extend slightly onto the Danubian Plain. To the south, the mountains border the Sub-Balkan valleys, a row of 11 valleys running from the Bulgarian-Serbian border east to the Black Sea, separating the Balkan Mountains from a chain of other ranges known as Srednogorie (which includes Vitosha and Sredna Gora).

The Balkan Mountains consist of around 30 distinct peaks; within Bulgaria, the range can be divided into three sections:

- The Western Balkan Mountains extend from Vrashka Chuka, at the border with Serbia, to the Pass of Arabakonak, with a total length of 190 kilometres (120 mi). The highest peak is Midžor, at 2,169 metres (7,116 ft).
- The Central Balkan Mountains run from Arabakonak to the Vratnik Pass, with a length of 207 kilometres (129 mi). Botev Peak, the highest mountain in the Balkan range at 2,376 metres (7,795 ft), is located in this section.
- The Eastern Balkan Mountains extend from the Vratnik Pass to Cape Emine, with a length of 160 kilometres (99 mi). The highest peak is Balgarka, at 1,181 metres (3,875 ft). The eastern Balkan Mountains form the lowest part of the range.

Distribution of the height belts in Stara Planina
Section	Area, km^{2}	%	Average altitude, m	0 – 200 m, km^{2}	%	200 – 600 m, km^{2}	%	600 – 1000 m, km^{2}	%	1000 – 1600 m, km^{2}	%	over 1600 m, km^{2}	%
Western Balkan Mountains	4 196,9	36.19	849	–	–	907.1	21.61	2 074,9	49.44	1 139,6	27.15	75.3	1.79
Central Balkan Mountains	3 400,9	29.33	961	–	–	549.8	16.17	1 512,7	44.48	1 076,7	31.66	261.7	7.70
Eastern Balkan Mountains	3 998,6	34.48	385	560	14.00	2 798,9	70.00	624.1	15.61	15.6	0.39	–	—
Total	11 596,4	100	722	560	4.83	4 255,8	36.70	4 211,7	36.32	2 231,9	19.25	337	2.91

=== Hydrology ===
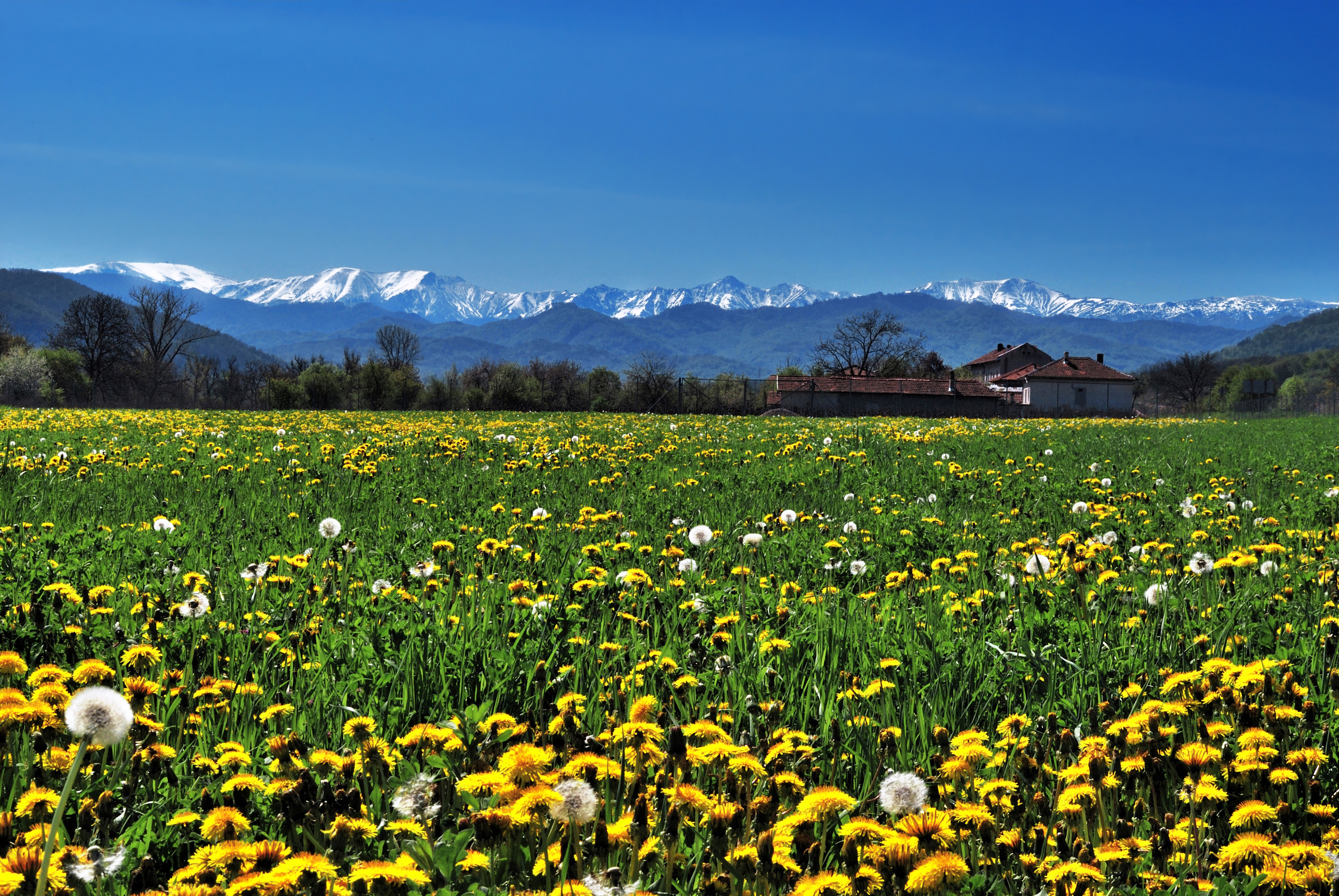
A view of the Balkan Mountains

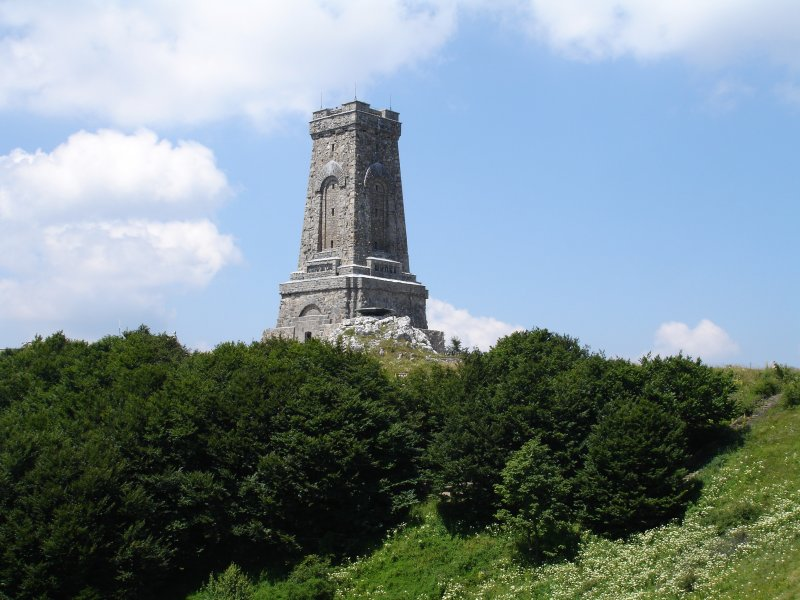
The monument on Shipka

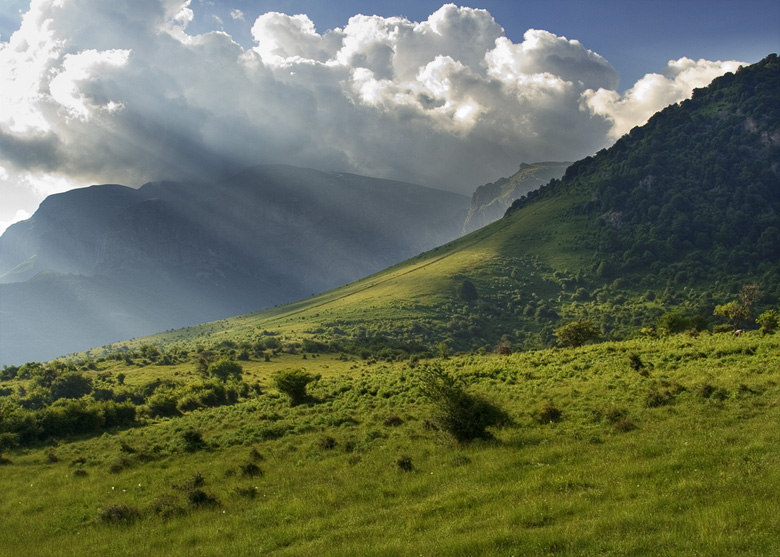
Central Balkan Mountains

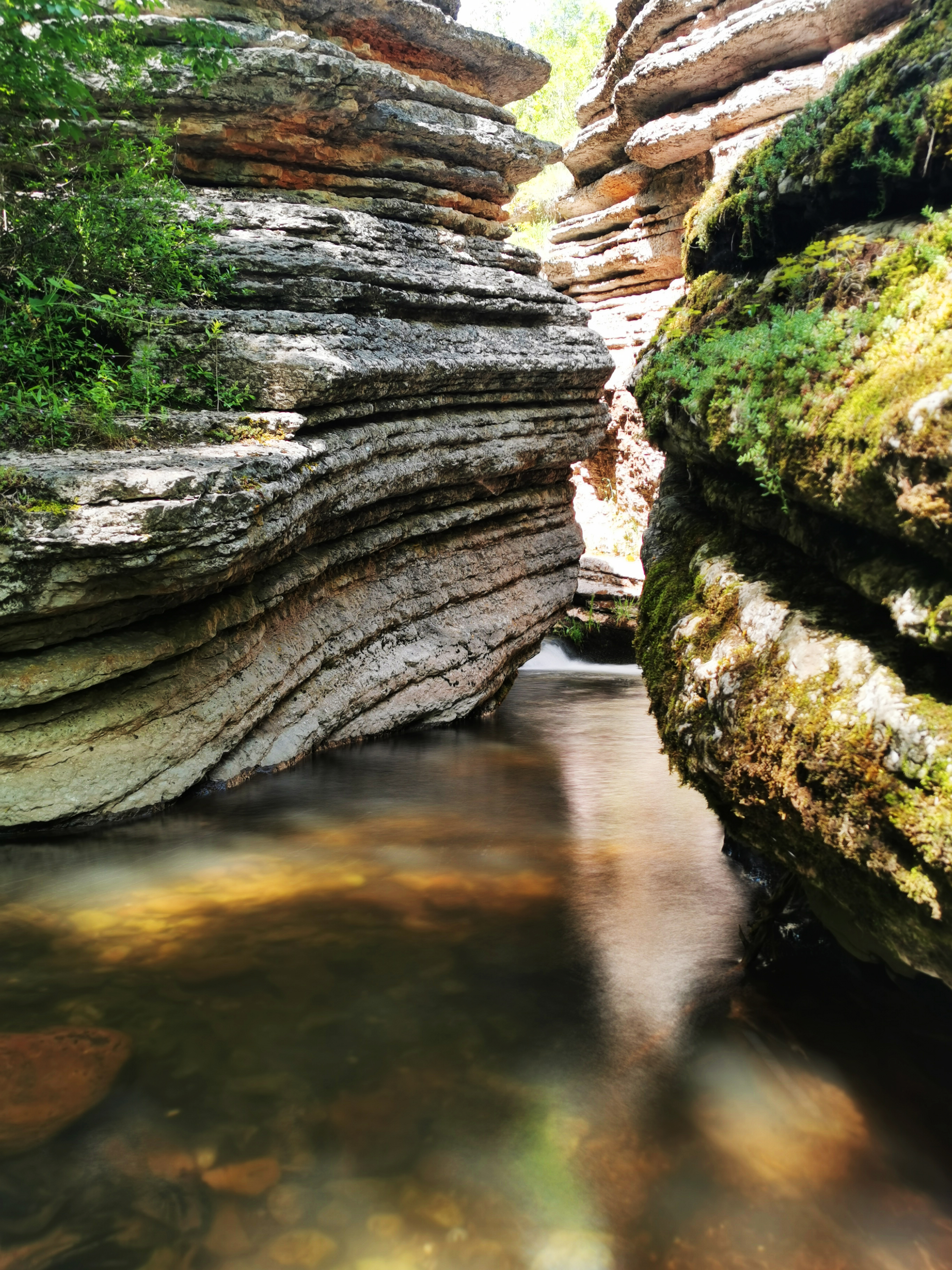
Rosomačka river, Serbia

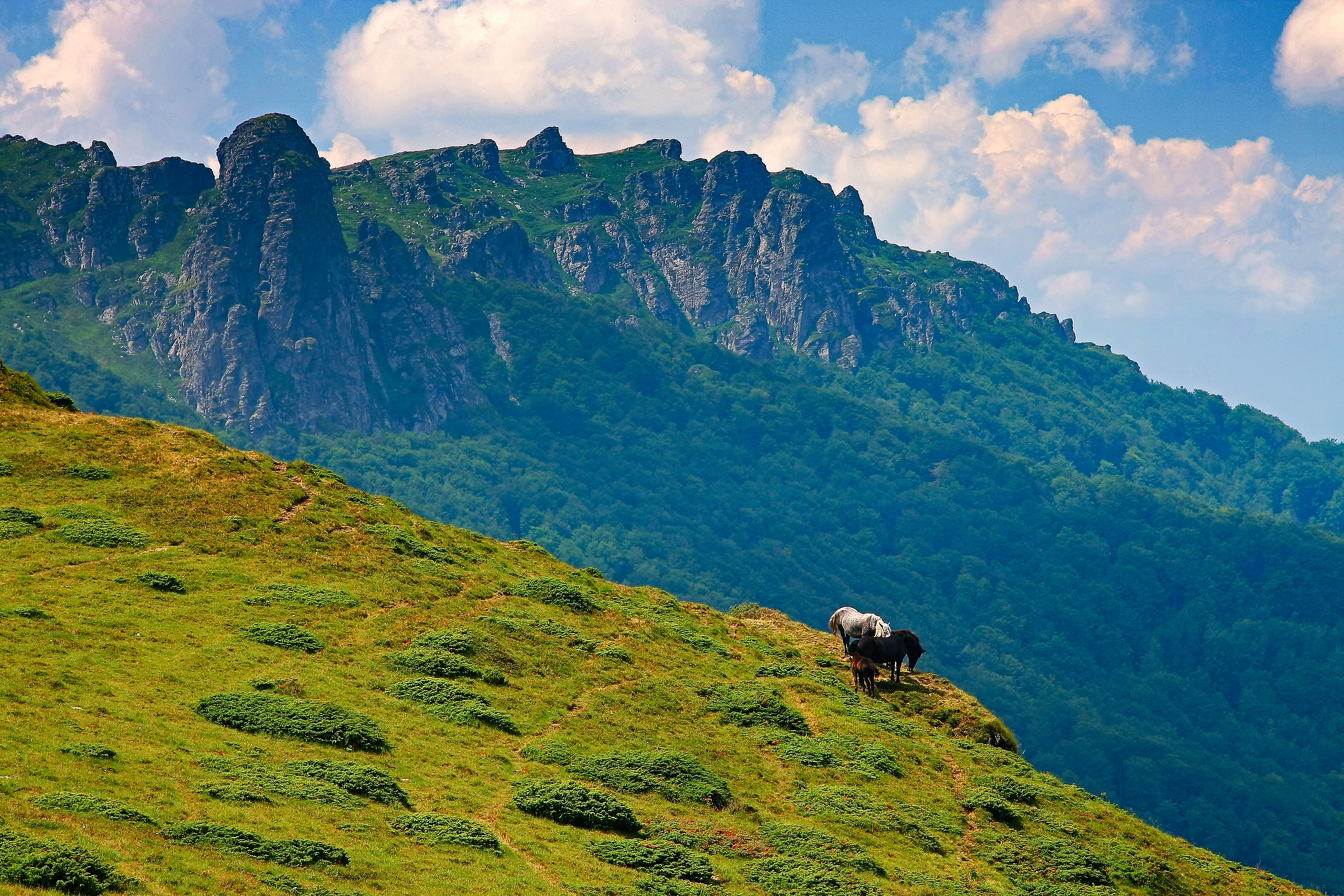
Horses at the Balkan Mountains, Serbia

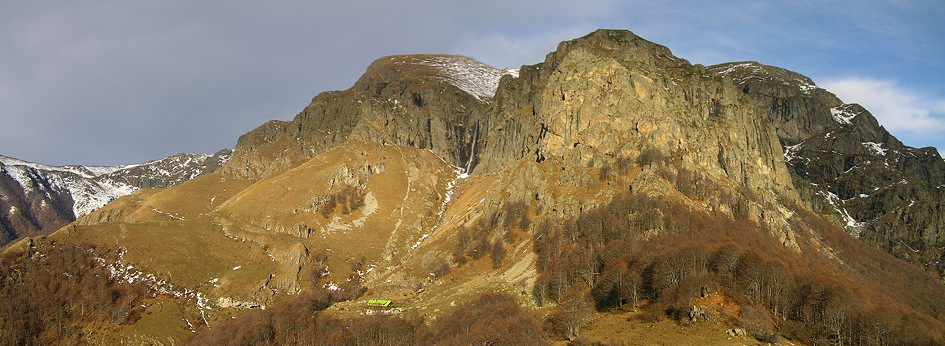
View from Ray Resthouse towards the Central Balkan Mountains with Raysko Praskalo waterfall in the middle

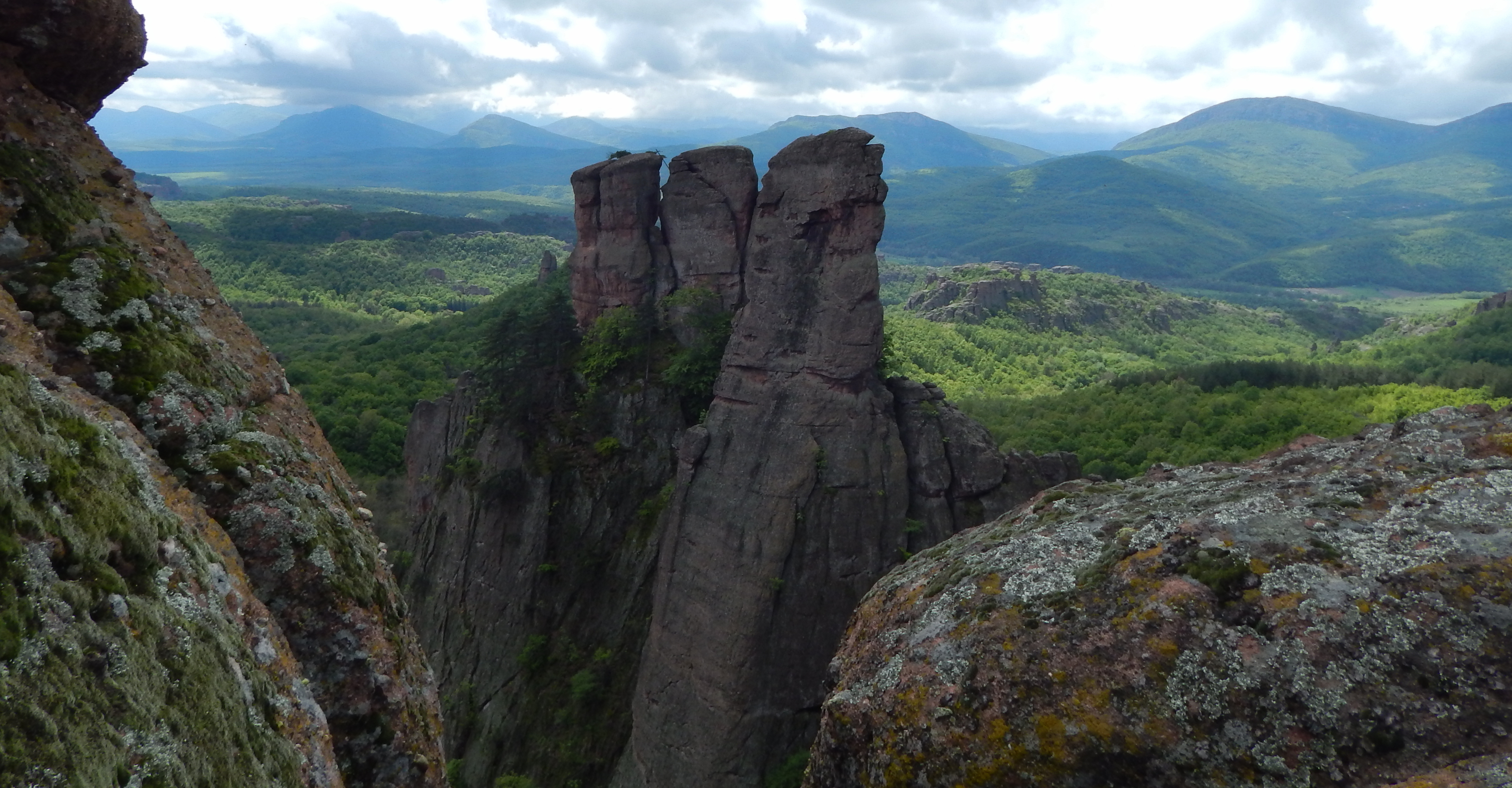
Belogradchik Rocks

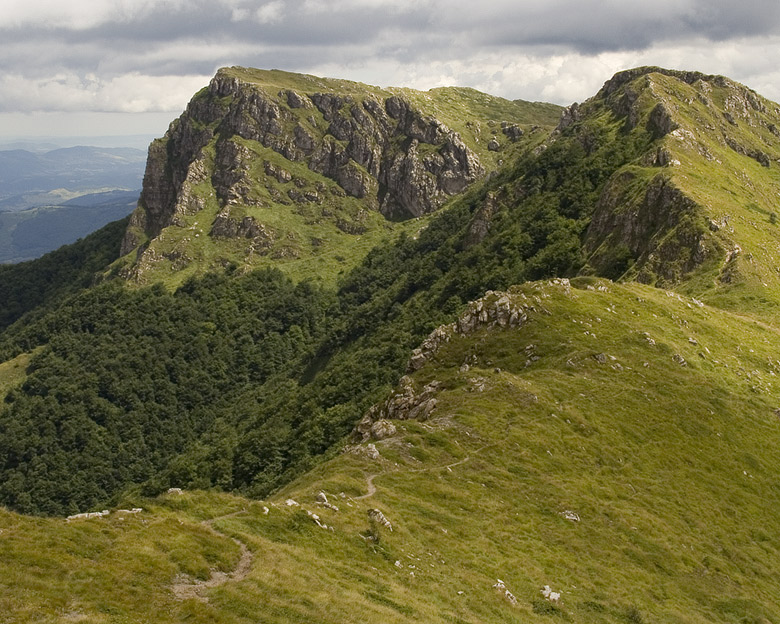
Kozya Stena Reserve

In their central and eastern sections, the mountains form a water divide between the rivers flowing to the Danube in the north and those flowing to the Aegean Sea in the south. However, they are crossed by Bulgaria's longest river, the Iskar, which forms the Iskar Gorge. Rivers that take their source from the Balkan Mountains and flow northwards to the Danube include the Timok, Archar, Lom, Tsibritsa, Ogosta, Skat, Vit, Osam, Yantra, and Rusenski Lom. The mountains are also the source of the Kamchiya, which flows directly into the Black Sea. Although not so abundant in mineral waters as other parts of Bulgaria, there are several spas such as Varshets, Shipkovo and Voneshta Voda.

Developments in modern times have completely changed the geography of Serbia, especially when it comes to waterfalls. Still, there are a number of waterfalls to be seen, especially in the western and central parts of the range, such as Raysko Praskalo (the highest waterfall in the Balkans), as well as Borov Kamak, Babsko Praskalo, Etropole Waterfall, Karlovsko Praskalo, and Skaklya, among others. The area of the Stara Planina has always been sparsely populated and inaccessible because of the rugged and forested terrain, but also as a location of the Serbian-Bulgarian border. As armies relinquished the borders, giving control to the border police, civilians were allowed to explore the area. As a result, higher and higher waterfalls have been discovered on the Serbian side of the Stara Planina in the years since, including Čungulj (1996) at 43 m (141 ft); Pilj (2002) at 64 m (210 ft); Kopren (2011) at 103.5 m (340 ft); and Kaluđerski Skokovi (2012) at 232 m (761 ft).

=== Passes ===
The mountains are crossed by 20 passes and two gorges. There are paved roads crossing the Balkan Mountains at the following passes (listed from west to east):

- Petrohan Pass: Sofia - Montana
- Iskar Gorge (Iskarski prolom): Sofia - Vratsa (also railroad)
- Vitinya Pass: Hemus motorway (A2), Sofia - Botevgrad
- Zlatishki Pass (Zlatishki prohod): Zlatitsa - Etropole (closed)
- Beklemeto Pass: Troyan - Sopot
- Shipka Pass: Gabrovo - Kazanlak (also railroad)
- Pass of the Republic (Prohod na republikata): Veliko Tarnovo - Gurkovo
- Vratnik Pass: Elena - Sliven
- Kotel Pass (Kotlenski prohod): Kotel - Petolachka (Pentagram) crossroads
- Varbitsa Pass (Varbishki prohod): Shumen - Petolachka crossroads
- Rish Pass (Rishki prohod): Shumen - Karnobat
- Luda Kamchiya Gorge (Ludokamchiyski prolom): Provadiya - Karnobat (also railroad)
- Aytos Pass (Aytoski prohod) - Provadiya - Aytos
- Dyulino Pass (Dyulinski prohod): Varna - Aytos
- Obzor Pass (Obzorski prohod): Varna - Burgas, future Cherno More motorway (A5)

=== Peaks ===
- Botev Peak 2,376 m (7,795 ft) (named after Hristo Botev)
- Malkiyat yumruk 2,340 m (7,677 ft)
- Golyam Kademliya (Triglav) 2,276 m (7,467 ft)
- Mlechen chal 2,255 m (7,398 ft)
- Zhaltets 2,227 m (7,306 ft)
- Paradzhika 2,209 m (7,247 ft)
- Vezhen Peak 2,198 m (7,211 ft)
- Midžor 2,169 m (7,116 ft), the highest peak in Serbia proper and north-western Bulgaria, 12th in the Balkan Mountains.
- Golyam Kupen 2,169 m (7,116 ft)
- Levski 2,166 m (7,106 ft) (named after Vasil Levski)
- Yurushka gramada 2,136 m (7,008 ft)
- Martinova chuka 2,111 m (6,926 ft)
- Malak Kupen 2,101 m (6,893 ft)
- Tetevenska Baba 2,071 m (6,795 ft)
- Buluvaniya 2,043 m (6,703 ft)
- Golyam Krastets 2,034 m (6,673 ft)
- Kostenurkata (The Turtle) 2,034 m (6,673 ft)
- Oba 2,033 m (6,670 ft)
- Kartala 2,031 m (6,663 ft)
- Pascal 2,029 m (6,657 ft)
- Ravnets 2,020 m (6,627 ft)
- Kom Peak 2,016 m (6,614 ft)
- Kositsa 2,001 m (6,565 ft)
- Replyanska tsarkva 1,969 m (6,460 ft)
- Golema chuka 1,967 m (6,453 ft)
- Svishti plaz 1,888 m (6,194 ft)
- Mara Gidia 1,790 m (5,873 ft)
- Todorini Kukli 1,785 m (5,856 ft)
- Haydushki kamak 1,721 m (5,646 ft)
- Murgash 1,687 m (5,535 ft)
- Koznitsa 1,637 m (5,371 ft)
- Chukava (Golema mountain) 1,588 m (5,210 ft)
- Gorno Yazovo 1,573 m (5,161 ft)
- Chumerna 1,536 m (5,039 ft)
- Ispolin 1,523 m (4,997 ft)
- Ravno buche 1,499 m (4,918 ft)
- Buzludzha 1,441 m (4,728 ft)
- Manyakov kamak 1,439 m (4,721 ft)
- Guvnishte 1,413 m (4,636 ft)
- Golemi Del 1,363 m (4,472 ft)
- Vetren Peak 1,330 m (4,364 ft)
- Shipka (Stoletov, St. Nikola) 1,329 m (4,360 ft)
- Goten (Sofiiska mountain) 1,294 m (4,245 ft)
- Petrovski krast 1,206 m (3,957 ft)

== History ==
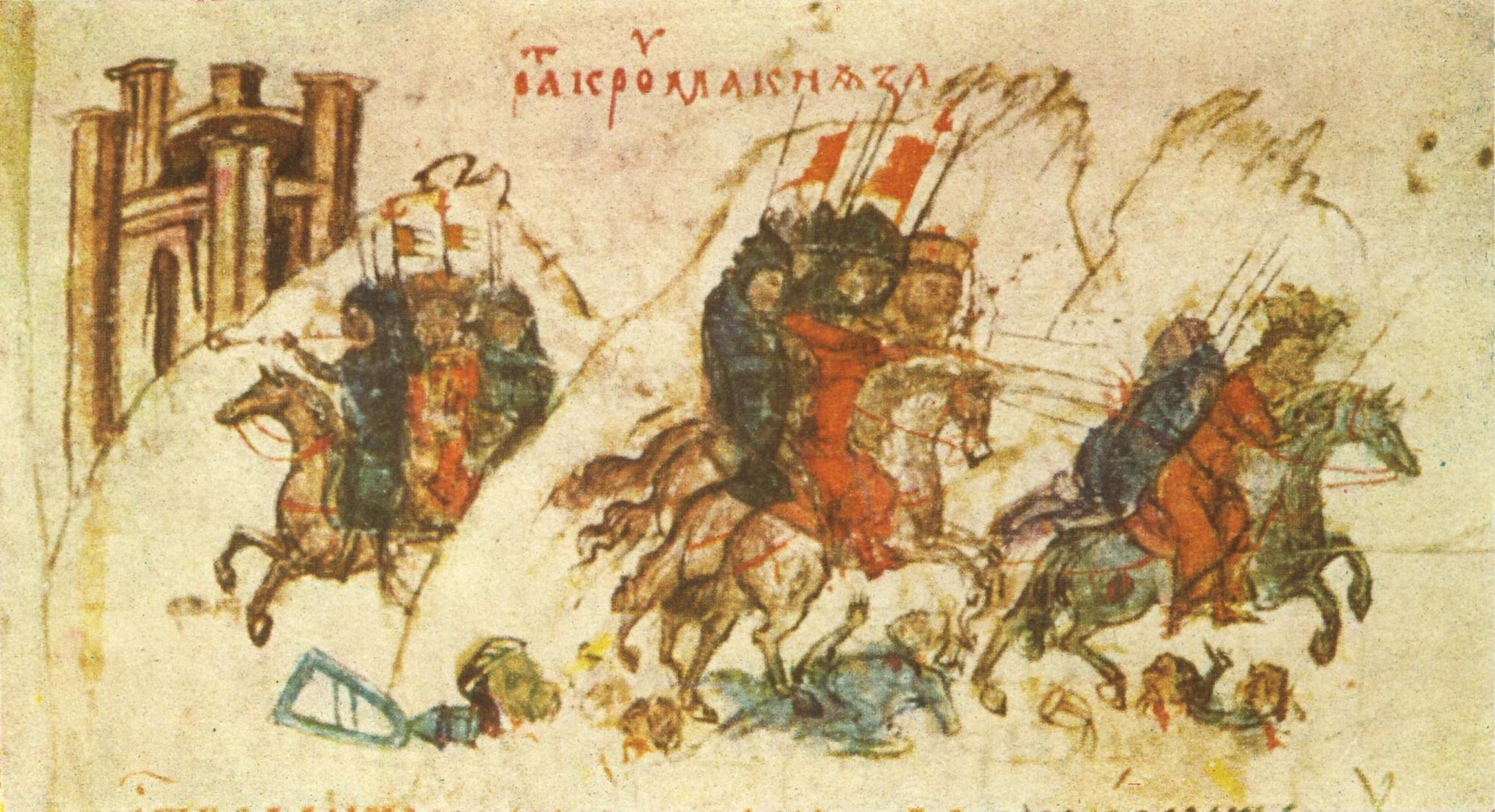
The Bulgarian army under Khan Krum defeats the Byzantine Emperor Nicephorus I in the battle of the Varbitsa Pass in 811, Manasses Chronicle

The Balkan Mountains have had a significant and special place in the history of Bulgaria since its founding in 681. It was a natural fortress of the Bulgarian Empire for centuries and formed an effective barrier to Moesia where most of the medieval capitals were located. The Balkan mountains were the site of numerous battles between the Bulgarian and Byzantine Empires including the Battle of the Rishki Pass (759), Battle of the Varbitsa Pass (811), the Battle of Tryavna (1190) and the Battle of Devina (1279). In the battle of the Varbitsa Pass, Khan Krum decisively defeated an enormous Byzantine army, killing Emperor Nikephoros I. For many centuries, the Byzantines feared these mountains, their armies reportedly retreating upon approaching them.

During the Ottoman rule, many haiduks found refuge in the Balkan Mountains. Close to the highest summit, Botev Peak, is Kalofer, the birthplace of Hristo Botev, a Bulgarian poet and national hero who died in the western Balkan Mountains near Vratsa in 1876 in the struggle against the Ottoman Empire. Also close to Botev is Shipka Pass, the scene of the four battles in the Russo-Turkish War, 1877-78, which ended Turkish rule in the Balkans.

== Protected areas and ecology ==
=== Bulgaria ===
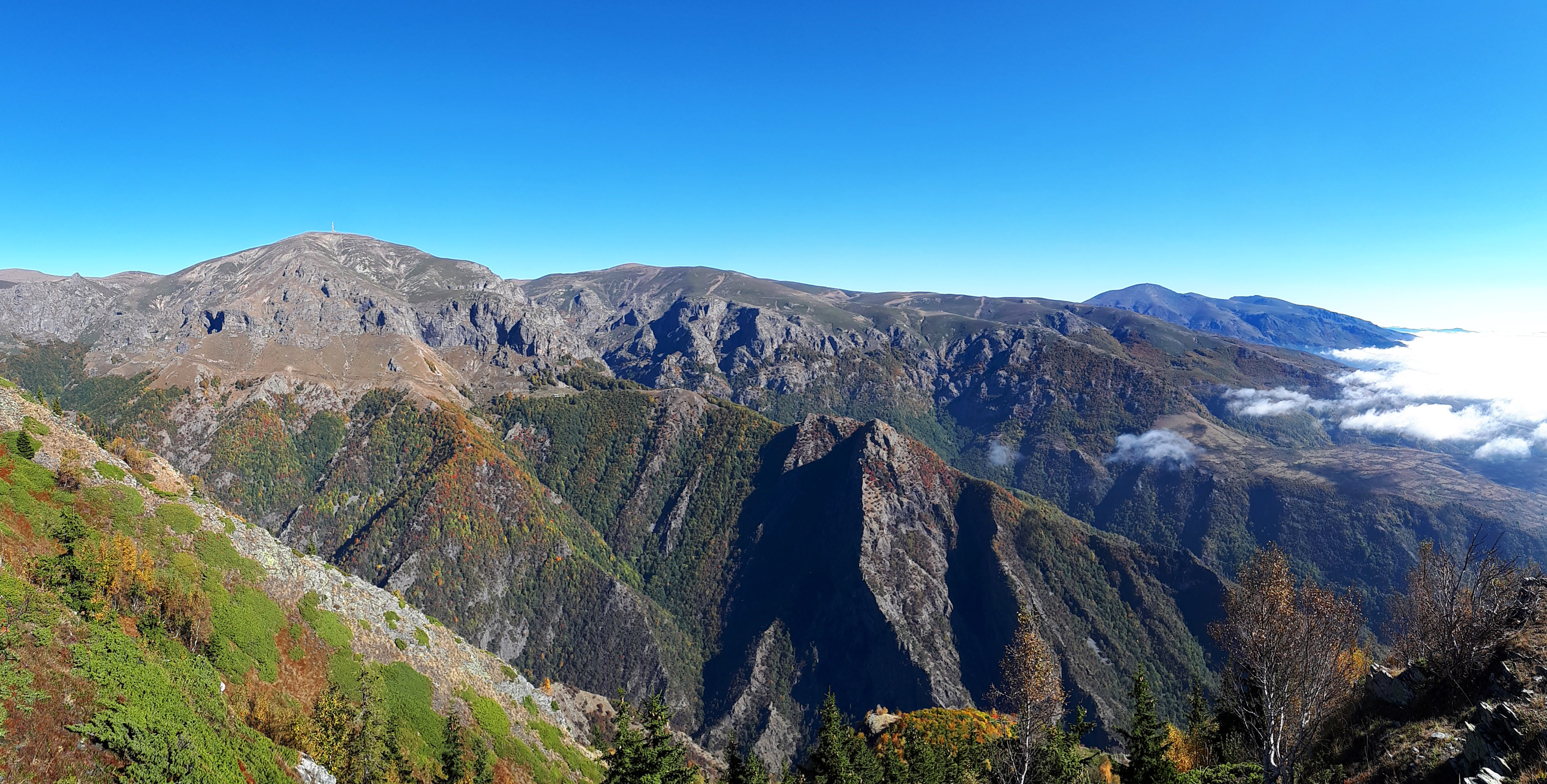
Dzhendema reserve within Central Balkan National Park

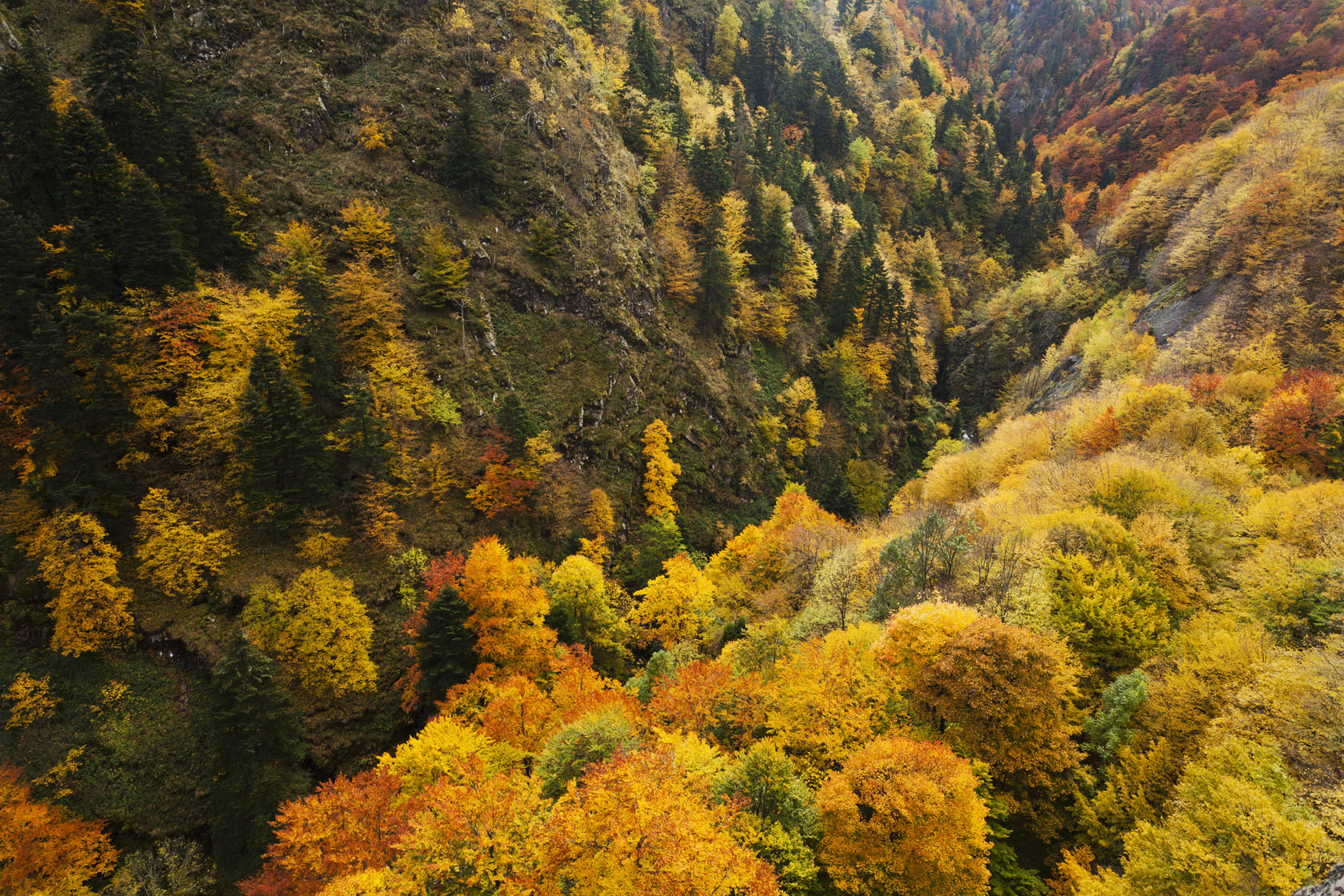
Autumn view of Steneto reserve

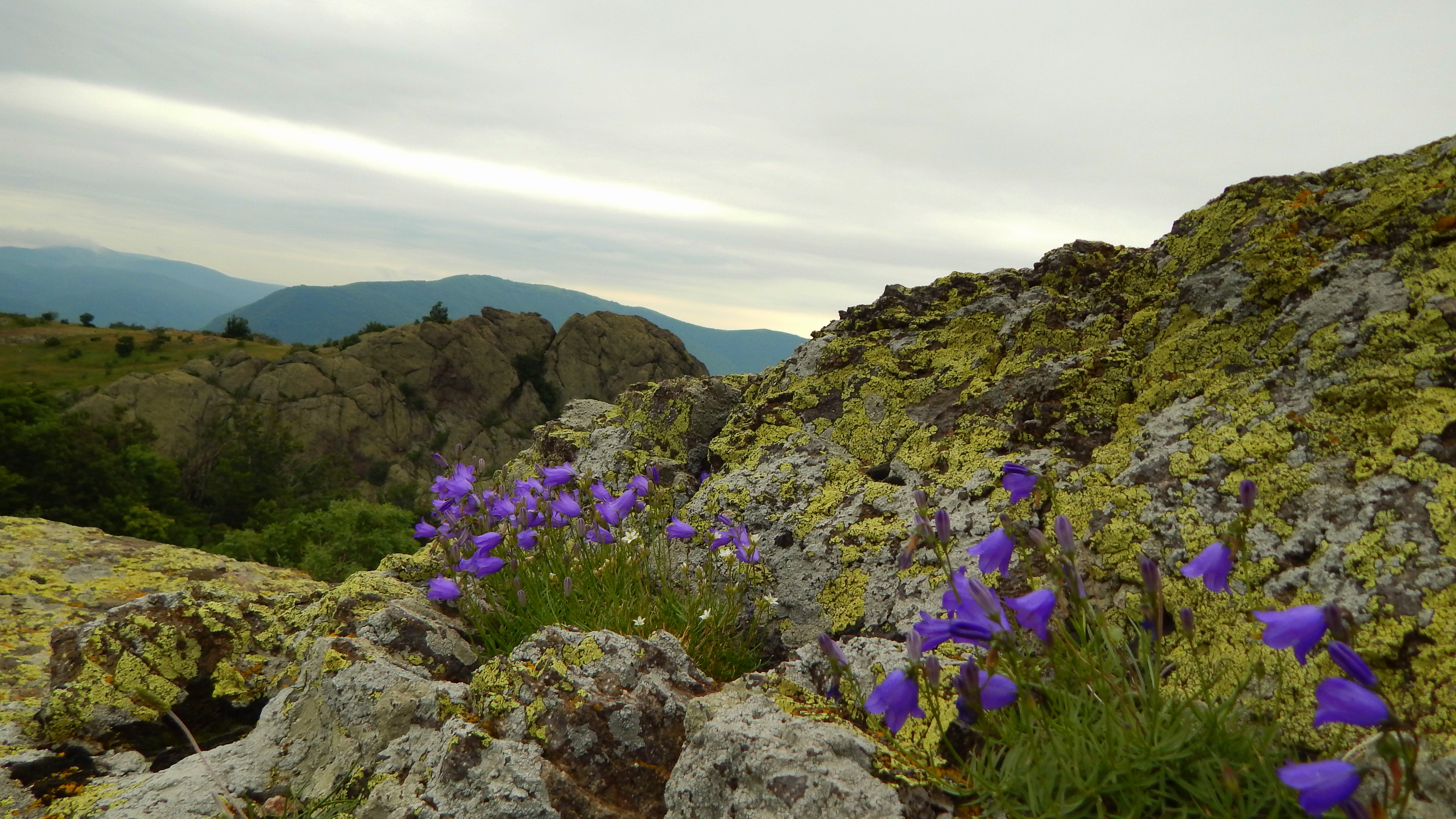
Flora of Karandila reserve, within Sinite Kamani Nature Park.

Significant areas of the Balkan mountains are under protection by Bulgarian law, including one national park — Central Balkan National Park; three nature parks — Vrachanski Balkan Nature Park, Bulgarka Nature Park and Sinite Kamani Nature Park, over 20 nature reserves, as well as numerous natural landmarks.

Central Balkan National Park is among the largest and most valuable of the protected areas in Europe. Since 2017, its ancient beech forests have been included in the Primeval Beech Forests UNESCO World Heritage Site. It is the third largest protected territory in Bulgaria, spanning an area of 716.69 km^{2} with total length of 85 km from the west to the east and an average width of 10 km. Within its territory are located the highest summit of the mountain range, Botev Peak (2376 m), as well as the highest waterfall in the Balkans Raysko Praskalo (124.5 m). The rugged and diverse relief determines the presence of numerous gorges, cliffs, water features and caves, including Raychova Dupka, the second-deepest cave discovered in Bulgaria and in the mountain range, reaching depth of -377 m.

The flora of Central Balkan National Park is diverse and consists of 1689 species of vascular plants, 45 species of algae and 238 species of mosses. These include 23 Bulgarian endemic species, such as leafy primrose (Primula frondosa), which is only found within the park's boundaries, Alchemilla achtarowii, Alchemilla jumrukczalica, Betonica bulgarica, Centaurea davidovii, as well as another 75 Balkan endemics.

The vertebrate fauna of Central Balkan National Park consists of over 300 species. The number of mammal species is around 60, including animals of high conservation concern, such as the: Balkan chamois (R. rupicapra balcanica), Eurasian brown bear, Eurasian otter, Eurasian wolf, European ground squirrel, European snow vole, European wild boar, European wildcat, Lesser mole-rat, Marbled polecat, Pine marten, Red deer, Red fox, Western roe deer.

The avifauna includes some 220 species, of which 123 are resident/nesting. The park is key for the protection of the eastern imperial eagle, saker falcon, Eurasian eagle-owl, Eurasian pygmy owl, Ural owl, boreal owl, white-backed woodpecker, semicollared flycatcher and the corn crake.

The park's herpetofauna includes 15 reptile and nine amphibian species. It hosts vital populations of common European adder (Vipera berus), European toad, grass snake (Natrix natrix), legless lizard, tessellated water snake, viviparous lizard and the common frog. Due to the park's high altitude, the ichthyofauna consists of six fish species, with brown trout being the dominant one.

Vrachanski Balkan Nature Park is situated in the western section of the mountain range and spans an area of 301.29 km^{2}. Its territory includes some of the most extensive karst areas in Bulgaria with over 600 caves, such as Ledenika, the gorge Vratsata whose 400 m vertical cliffs are the highest in the Balkans, and numerous waterfalls, such as Skaklia (141 m drop but unlike Raysko Praskalo it is seasonal) and Borov Kamak (63 m drop). The flora includes 1082 species of vascular plants and 186 species of mosses. The endemism is lowers when compared to the Central Balkan National Park — 6 Bulgarian and another 36 Balkan endemic species. The vertebrate fauna encompasses 276 species. The recorded mammal species are 58 and include gray wolf, golden jackal, wildcat, marbled polecat, European polecat, European pine marten and 22 bat species. The birds are 181 species, including 124 nesting ones. Typical species are the golden eagle, long-legged buzzard, peregrine falcon, Eurasian eagle-owl, Alpine chough, Alpine swift, Eurasian crag martin, red-rumped swallow, wallcreeper, etc. There are 15 reptile and 11 amphibian species; of them important populations exist of the meadow lizard, European copper skink, Balkan crested newt, as well as the only habitat in Bulgaria of the northern crested newt, which is also its southernmost locality worldwide. There have been successful efforts in the reintroduction of two vulture species that went extinct from the mountain range in the past several decades. In 2021 the first cinereous vulture in Bulgaria in nearly 30 years hatched in Kotel mountains in the eastern section of the mountain range, thus establishing the second breeding colony in the Balkans, after the one in north-eastern Greece. In recent years, several breeding pairs of griffon vulture have established themselves in the Vratsa Balkan to the west, as well as in the eastern sections of the Balkan Mountains. The eastern Balkan Mountains are among the priority areas in the reintroduction programme for the bearded vulture. Since the early XXI century there have been several records of the Eurasian lynx, which has been considered extincts in Bulgaria since the 1940s, in a number of localities along the Balkan Mountains.

=== Serbia ===
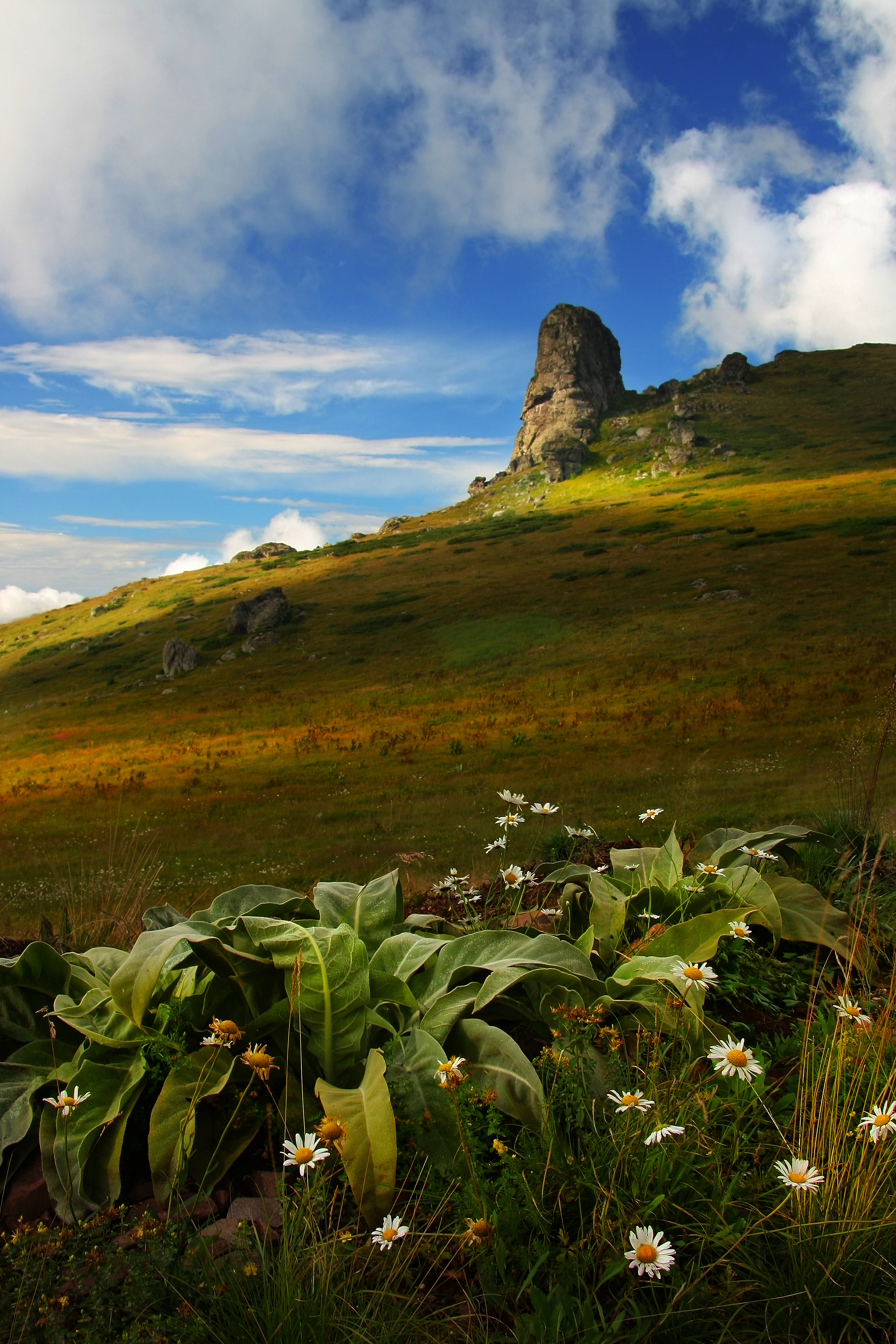
The Nature Park Stara Planina

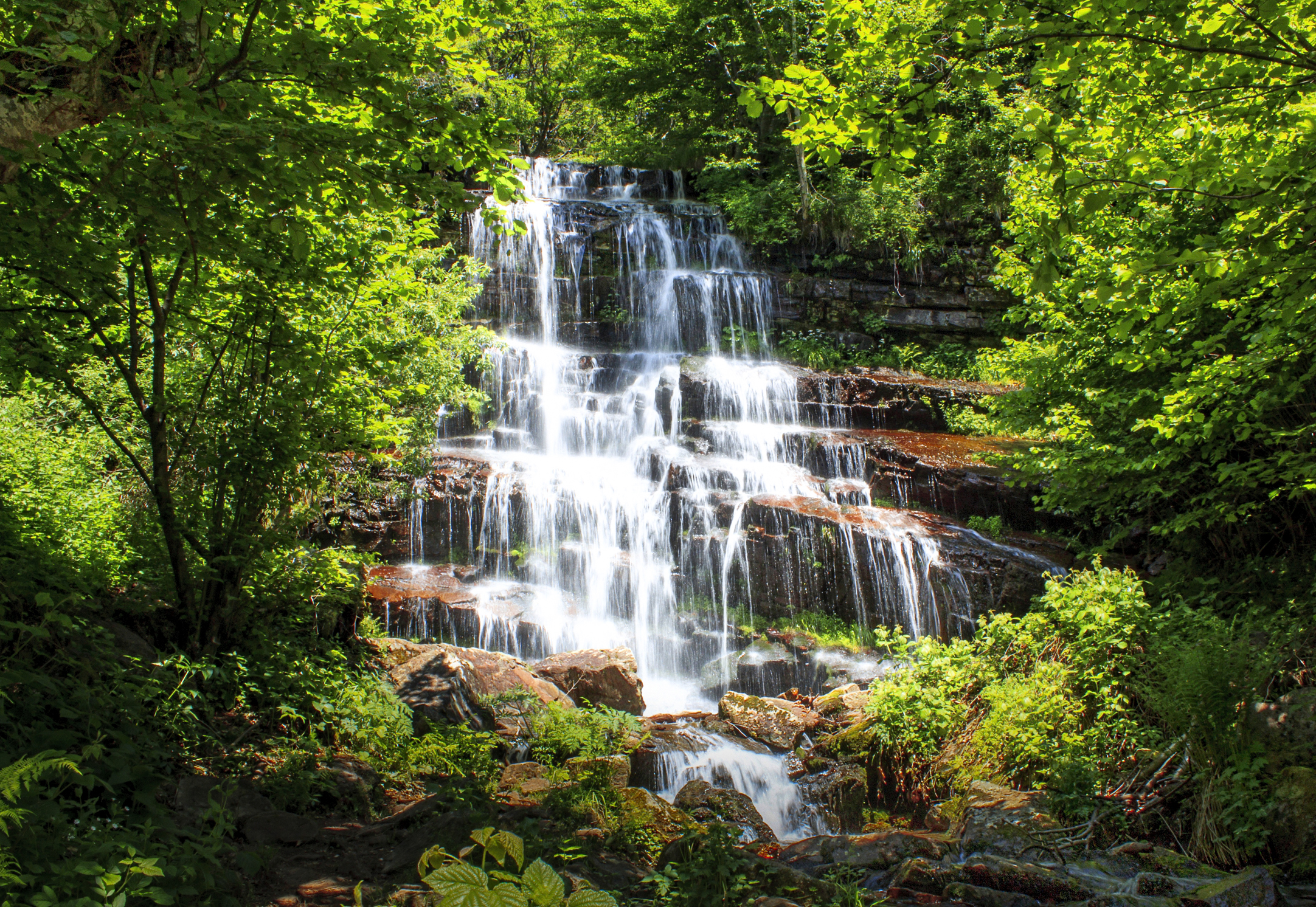
Tupavica Waterfalls

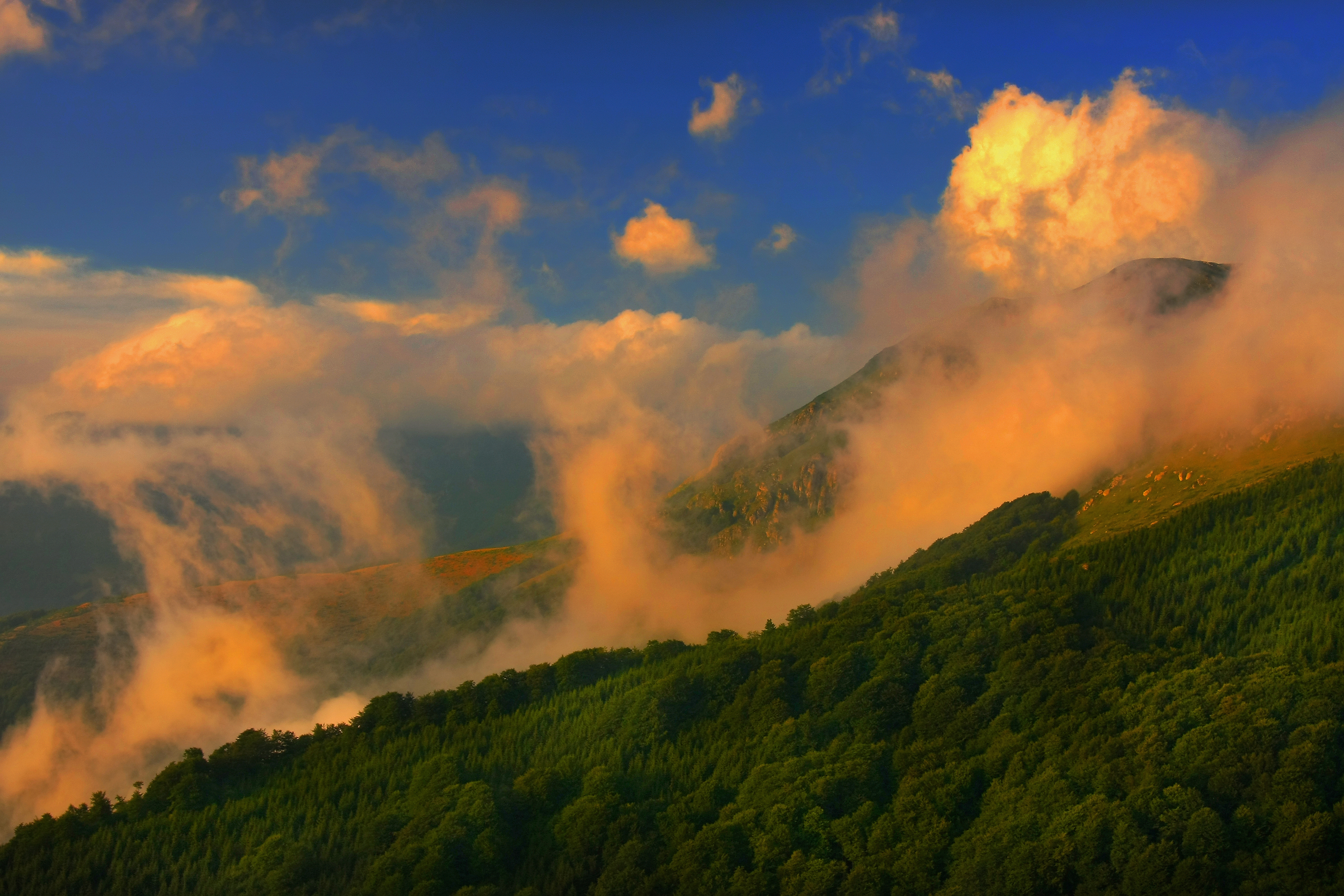
The Nature Park Stara Planina

First group of trees was protected in 1966, followed by the creation of 7 special nature reserves and 3 natural monuments in the 1980s. Nature park Stara Planina was established in 1997 and since 2009 is in its present borders, covering an area of 1,143.22 km^{2} (441.40 sq mi). The protected area was expanded in 2020.

The sediments extend from the Paleozoic to the Cenozoic eras. Limestone terrain is known for the short losing streams and tufaceous waterfalls. There are canyons and gorges, like those of the Toplodolska reka and Rosomačka reka rivers. The Rosomača canyon (Rosomački lonci or Slavinjsko grlo), with its 60 metres (200 ft) tall, cascade limestone walls, is known for its resemblance of the Colorado's Grand Canyon, but on a much smaller scale. The 500 metres (1,600 ft) long gorge is a remnant of the former cave which eroded in time. Underground waters on the mountain reach the surface in the forms of common springs, well-springs (vrelo) and diffused springs (pištevina). There are some 500 springs with the flow of over 0.1 L/s (1.3 imp gal/min). The strongest spring is the intermittent Jelovičko vrelo, known for its fluctuations, characterized by the bubbling and foaming.

Montane ecosystems are diverse and include several plant communities: forests, shrubs, meadows, pastures and peatlands. There are six different vegetation zone in the park. Oak, beech, spruce, subalpine zone of the shrub vegetation of common horsetail, blueberry, subalpine spruce and mugo pine. Other plants include shrub alder, steppe pedunculate oak, but also rare and endangered species like European pasqueflower, yellow pheasant's eye, Kosovo peony, common sundew, Heldreich's maple, martagon lily, pygmy iris and marsh orchid. In total, there are 1,190 plant species, including a locally endemic winged bellflower (Campanula calyciliata) and Pančić's frog grass (Senecio pancicii), which can be found only on the mountain. There are also communities of mountainous sphagnum bogs on the localities of Jabučko Ravnište, Babin Zub and Arbinje. Some 350 herb species are considered medicinal or aromatic. In 2022, several independent surveys from various universities and institutes were conducted, in order to list all of them, to enhance their protection, and to check possibilities for potential plantation production. Vast areas south and southeast from the mountain are already transformed into the aromatic herbs plantations, especially the entire slopes of the nearby mountains being planted with lavender.

In the 1980s, fossils of Thecodontosaurus were discovered on the mountain. It is one of the oldest recorded species of dinosaurs, and the remains are estimated to be some 250 million years old.

Some 190 species of butterflies are recorded. The area is a salmonid region, inhabited by the riverine brown trout. Another 25 species of fish live in the rivers and streams, so as the fire salamander and newts. Over 30 mammalian species are found in the park, including lesser mole-rat, hazel dormouse and the Tertiary relict, European snow vole. Brown bear became extinct in Serbian part, but evidence showing the presence of the bears were found in 2014. The bears have been photographed in 2015, before disappearing again until 2019 when a young brown bear was filmed on camera.

There are 203 species of birds, of which 154 are nesting in the park, 10 are wintering, 30 are passing and 13 are wandering. Important species include golden eagle, Ural owl and hawk. As the park is the most important habitat in Serbia for long-legged buzzard, Eurasian woodcock and an endemic Balkan horned lark, an area of 440 km^{2} (170 sq mi) was declared a European Important Bird Area. The griffon vulture disappeared from the region in the late 1940s. In 2017 a program for their reintroduction began within the scope of a wider European program. Among other things, the feeders will be placed along the vultures' migratory route. By 2023, there were regular sightings of griffon vultures, and, thanks to the efforts of Bulgarian and Spanish ornithologists, the cinereous vultures were seen flying over the Serbian side, while the population decline of Egyptian vultures was slowed down. Neither griffon nor cinereous vultures are still nesting on Serbian side. The latter has not been nesting since the 1960s, when they were eradicated through the state operated campaign of poisoning wolves.

Human heritage spans from the prehistoric remains, Classical antiquity including the Roman period and late mediaeval monastic complexes. Some of those older monuments are fragmentary and relocated from their original locations. There are numerous examples of the ethnic edifices characteristic for the architecture of the region in the late 19th and early 20th century (houses, barns, etc.)

Serbian section of the mountain is seen as a location for dozens of micro hydros, mini power plants which caused problem with the environmentalists and local population. Even the Ministry for environmental protection halted some of the projects and litigated with the investors. They also announced the change of the Nature protection law, which will permanently forbid the construction of plants in protected areas. In order to prevent further degradation, the Nature Park Stara Planina was nominated for the UNESCO's Man and the Biosphere Programme and for the world list of geoparks, while over tens of thousands of citizens signed petitions against the micro hydros and numerous protests have been organized by the local population. This prompted similar protests in other parts of Serbia and the association "Defend the rivers of Stara Planina" was founded, which expanded its base of operations outside of the Stara Planina region. The activism resulted in various physical altercation between the local citizens on one, and contractors and their security guards on the other side, amidst the police interventions.

A video of Stara Planina in Serbia.

In October 2018, Minister of Environmental Protection Goran Trivan, said that the current law allows for the micro hydros to be built in the protected areas. The government allowed the construction of 800 micro hydros, which has been described as "megalomaniacal" by the ecologists, as they would produce less than 1% of the total electricity. Environmentalists also accused the government of destroying the plant and animal life using the pretext of renewable energy. In September 2019, Pirot city administration announced it is removing from the spatial plan all 43 existing locations for the micro hydros on the protected area of Stara Planina. There are 15 locations remaining in the unprotected sector of the mountain, but city officials announced abolishing of these locations in the future, too.

By the 2020s, Stara Planina became a popular filmmaking locality. With Serbian productions, the foreign movies were also filmed here, including the 2019 Indian action movie Uri: The Surgical Strike. Its director, Aditya Dhar, expressed surprise with "unremarkable similarity between Stara Planina and Kashmir". The 2022 Australian Oscar entry You Won't Be Alone was also filmed on the mountain.

== See also ==
- Balkans
- Kom–Emine, a high-mountain long-distance trail along the main ridge of the Balkan Mountains
- List of mountain ranges
- Rhodope Mountains, Rila, Pirin, Dinaric Alps, Šar mountain, Pindus, Strandzha – other major mountain chains in the Balkan region
