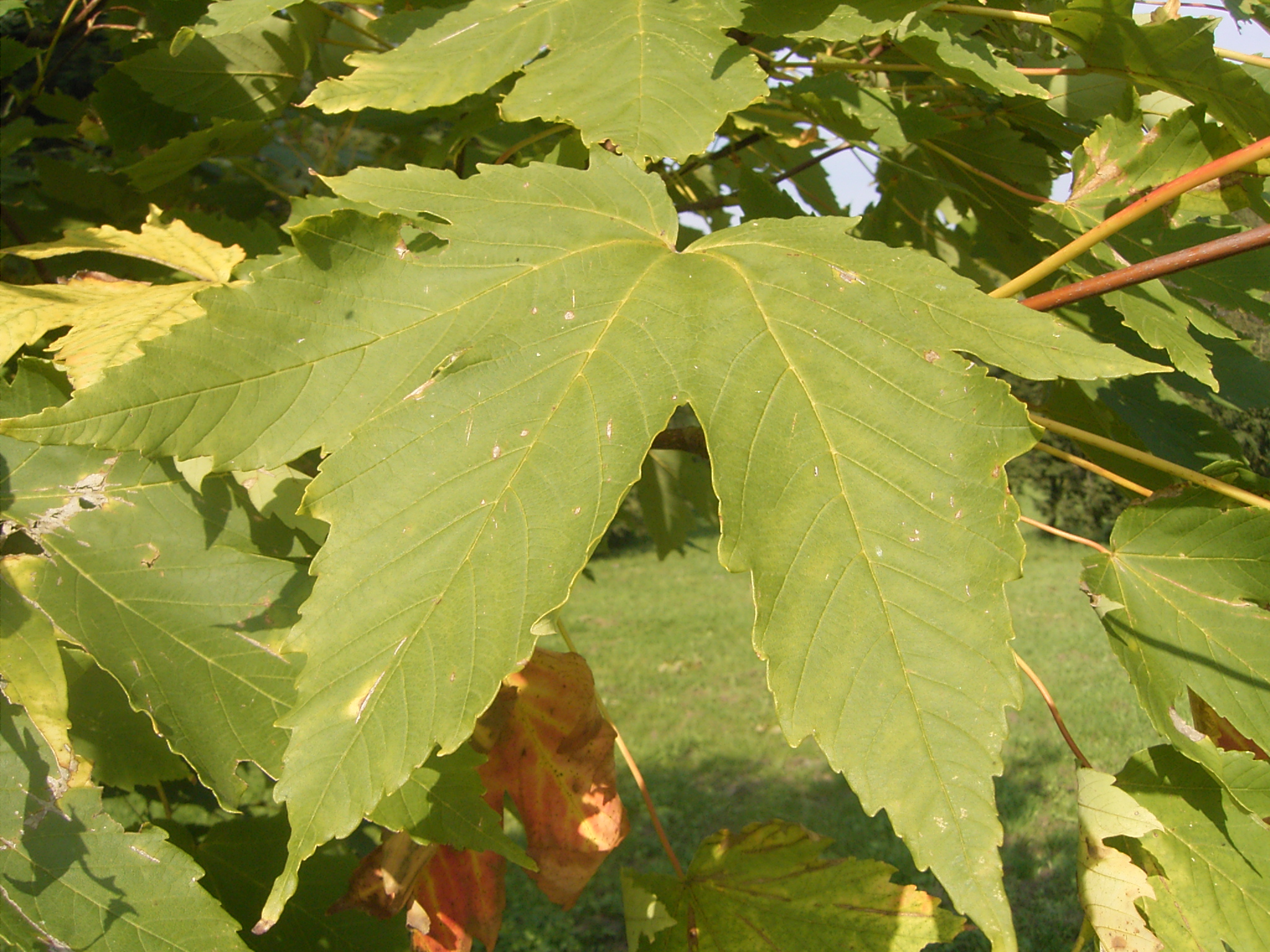

Conservation status
- Least Concern (IUCN 3.1)

Scientific classification
- Kingdom: Plantae
- Clade: Embryophytes
- Clade: Tracheophytes
- Clade: Spermatophytes
- Clade: Angiosperms
- Clade: Eudicots
- Clade: Rosids
- Order: Sapindales
- Family: Sapindaceae
- Genus: Acer
- Section: Acer sect. Acer
- Series: Acer ser. Acer
- Species: A. heldreichii

Binomial name
- Acer heldreichii Orph. ex Boiss.

Varieties
- Acer heldreichii var. heldreichii; Acer heldreichii var. trautvetteri (Medw.) A.E.Murray

Synonyms
- Acer macropterum Vis.; Acer visianii Nyman; Acer trautvetteri Medw. (synonym of Acer heldreichii var. trautvetteri)

= Acer heldreichii =

Species of flowering plant

Acer heldreichii is a species of maple in the flowering plant family Sapindaceae. Commonly called Balkan maple, Greek maple, Heldreich's maple, or mountain maple the species is native to the Balkan Peninsula east along the southern and eastern coasts of the Black Sea.

Acer heldreichii is a tree up to 20 m (65.6 ft) tall with smooth bark. Leaves are 5–14 cm (2.0–5.5 in) long, deeply cut into three to five lobes which turn yellow to golden brown during the fall.
