= Central Balkan National Park =

National park in Bulgaria

- IUCN category II (national park)
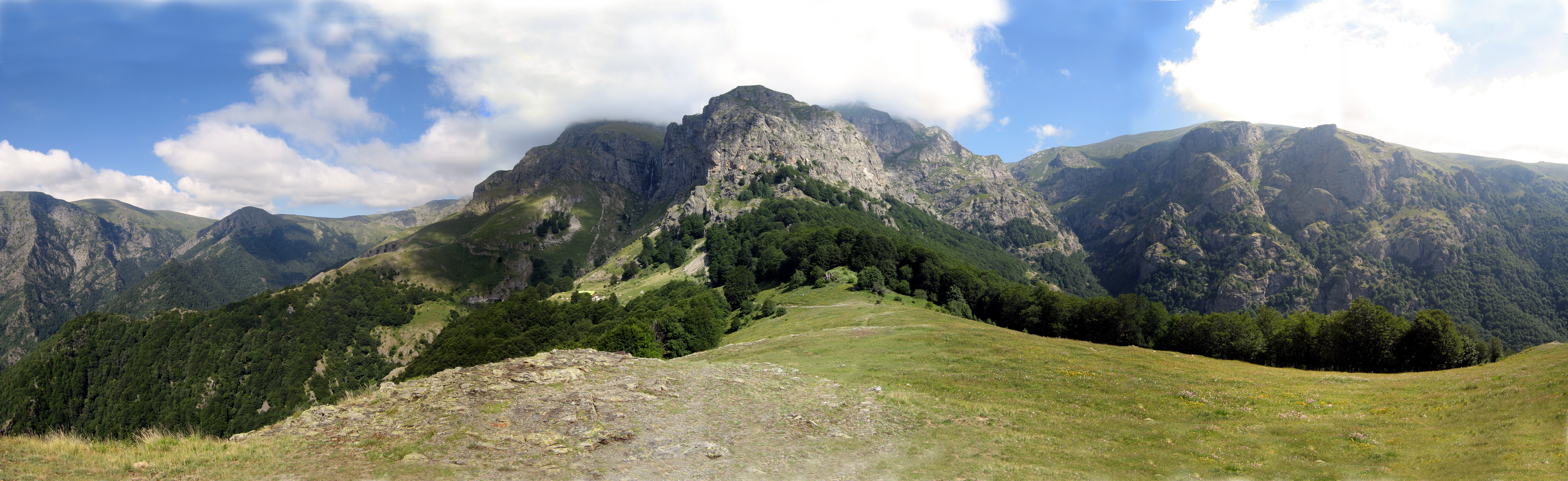
- Panoramic view of Botev Peak and Raysko Praskalo Waterfall

- Location within Bulgaria
- Interactive map of Central Balkan National Park
- Location: Balkan Mountains, Bulgaria
- Coordinates: 42°46′16.35″N 24°29′43.6″E
- Area: 716.69 km^{2} (276.72 sq mi)
- Established: 1991
- Governing body: Ministry of Environment and Water of Bulgaria

The Central Balkan National Park (Bulgarian: Национален парк Централен Балкан) is a national park in the heart of Bulgaria, nestled in the central and higher portions of the Balkan Mountains. Its altitude varies from 550 metres (1,800 ft) near the town of Karlovo to 2,376 metres (7,795 ft) at Botev Peak, the highest summit in the range. It was established on 31 October 1991.

The park is the third-largest protected territory in Bulgaria, spanning an area of 716.69 km^{2} with a total length of 85 km from west to east and an average width of 10 km. It occupies parts of 5 of the country's 28 provinces: Lovech, Gabrovo, Sofia, Plovdiv and Stara Zagora. The national park also includes nine nature reserves, covering 28% of its territory: Boatin, Tsarichina, Kozya Stena, Steneto, Severen Dzhendem, Peeshti Skali, Sokolna, Dzhendema and Stara Reka.

The Central Balkan National Park is one of the largest and most valuable of the protected areas in Europe. The International Union for Conservation of Nature (IUCN) has listed the Park as Category 2. The national park and eight of the nine nature reserves are on the UN list of Representative Protected Areas, and four of the nature reserves are included in the World Network of Biosphere Reserves under the UNESCO Man and Biosphere Programme. The park was a full member of the WWF-led PAN Parks foundation. Since 2017, the ancient beech forests within all nine park reserves have been included in the Primeval Beech Forests World Heritage Site.

The park falls within the Rodope montane mixed forests terrestrial ecoregion of the Palearctic temperate broadleaf and mixed forest. It is home to rare and endangered wildlife species and communities, self-regulating ecosystems of biological diversity, as well as historical sites of global cultural and scientific significance. The park's flora includes 2,340 species and subspecies of plants. Forests occupy 56% of the total area. There are 59 species of mammals, 224 species of birds, 14 species of reptiles, 8 species of amphibia and 6 species of fish, as well as 2,387 species of invertebrates.

== History ==
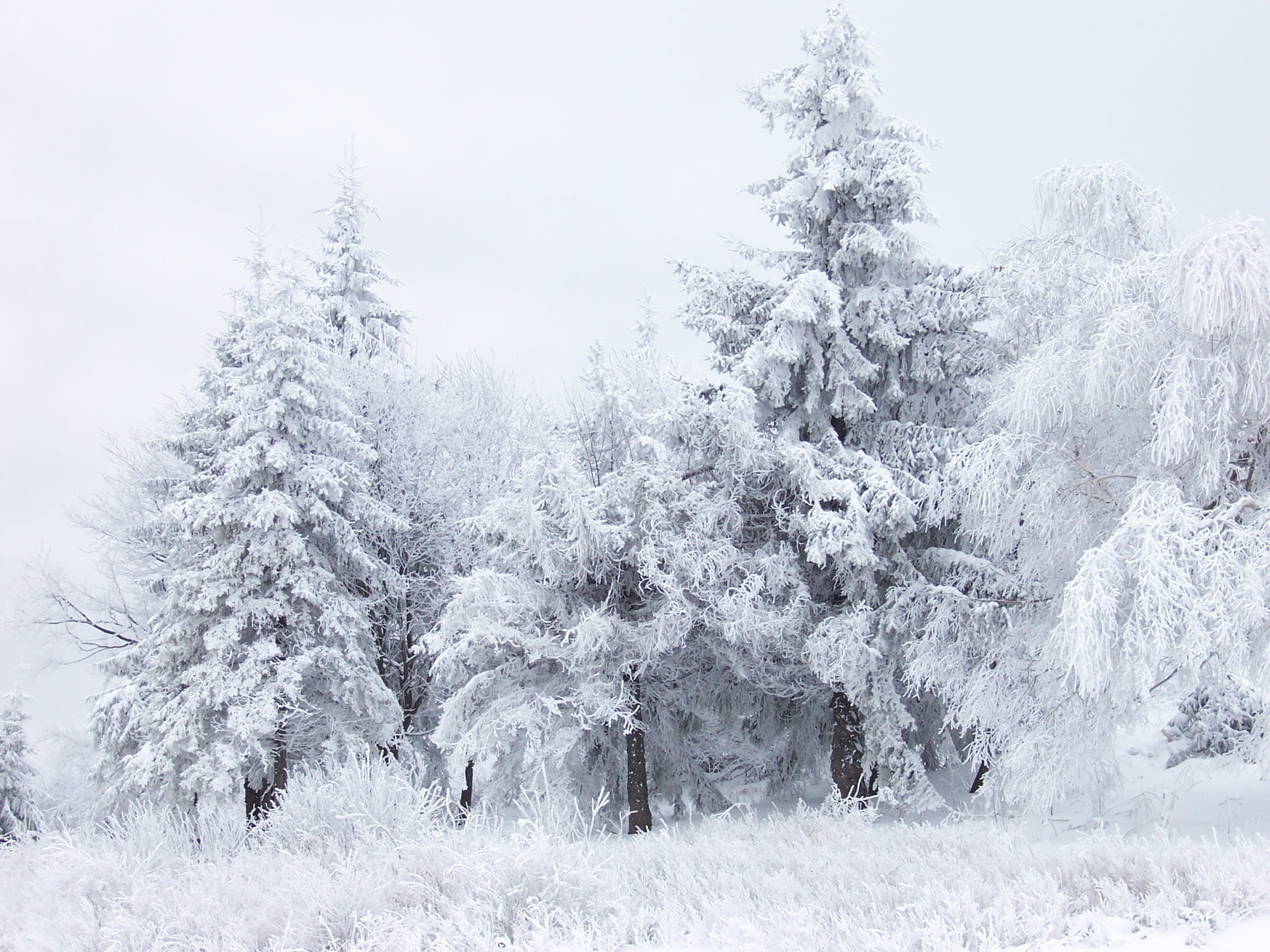
The park in winter

The Central Balkan National Park was established in 1991 to conserve the unique natural scenery and heritage of this area and protect the customs and livelihood of the local population. The Park Directorate, a regional body of the Ministry of the Environment and Waters, manages the Park. The Directorate engages local organizations, volunteers, and mountain enthusiasts in pursuing its goals.

=== Park statistics ===
- Area: 71,669.5 hectares
- Total length: 85 km
- Average width: 10 km
- Highest peak: Botev Peak at 2,376 meters above sea level
- Lowest elevation: near Karlovo, about 500 meters above sea level
- Wooded area: 44,000.8 hectares
- Treeless area: 27,668.7 hectares
- 70% of all ecosystems are natural
- There are 9 nature reserves, with a combined area of 20,019 hectares

== Ecosystems ==
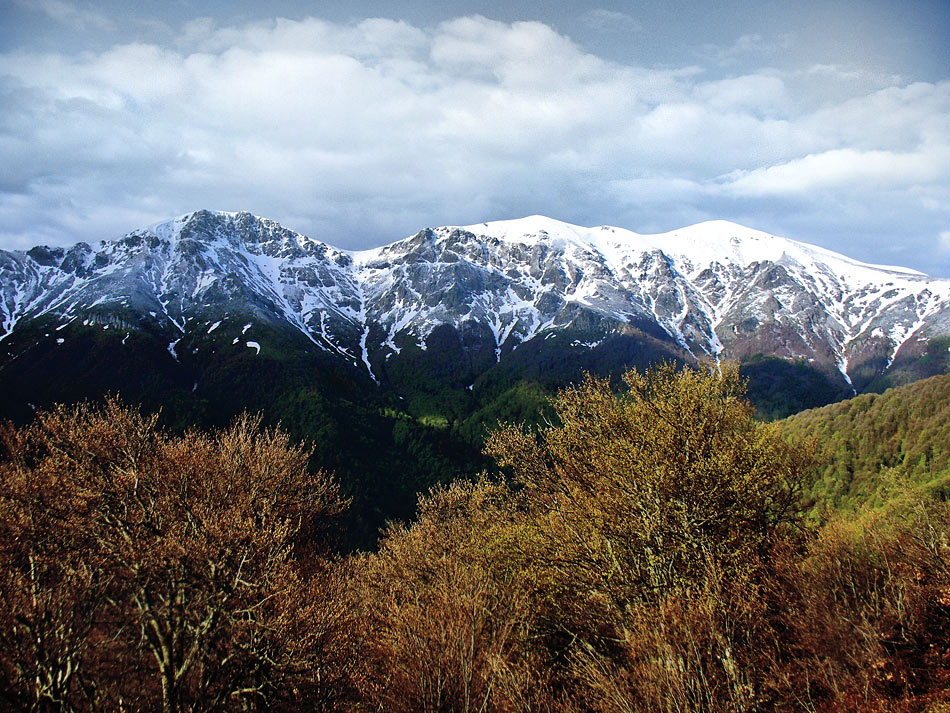
Triglav Massif

Centuries-old forests of beech, spruce, fir, hornbeam, and durmast oak cover most of the park. More than half of Bulgaria's native flora has been identified within the park, and of these, 10 species and two subspecies are endemic, found nowhere else in the world. Over 130 higher plants and animals encountered in the Central Balkan National Park are listed in the Bulgarian and the World Red Book of Endangered Species.

There are 166 known species of medicinal plants within park boundaries, 12 of which are protected by law. In addition, there are 229 species of moss, 256 species of mushrooms, and 208 species of algae. The central portion of the Balkan Range is home to 70% of all invertebrate organisms and 62% of all vertebrate animals in Bulgaria. There are 224 separate species of birds, making the Central Balkan National Park an important international bird refuge.

The EU-funded CORINE BIOTOPS Project created a habitat classification methodology and 49 of the CORINE-classified habitat types are represented in the Central Balkan National Park. Of these, 24 are included on the 'List of Endangered Habitats', requiring special protection measures pursuant to the EU Convention on Habitats.

== Terrain ==
The park's topography includes large alpine meadows, vertical rock faces, precipices, deep canyons, and waterfalls, as well as numerous mountain peaks, of which some 20 are situated at altitudes of 2,000 meters or higher. The Central Balkan National Park is a favorite spot for tourists, naturalists, and scientists alike.
