= Dzhendema =

Nature reserve in Bulgaria

- (Bulgarian: Джендема [d͡ʒɛnˈdɛmɐ])
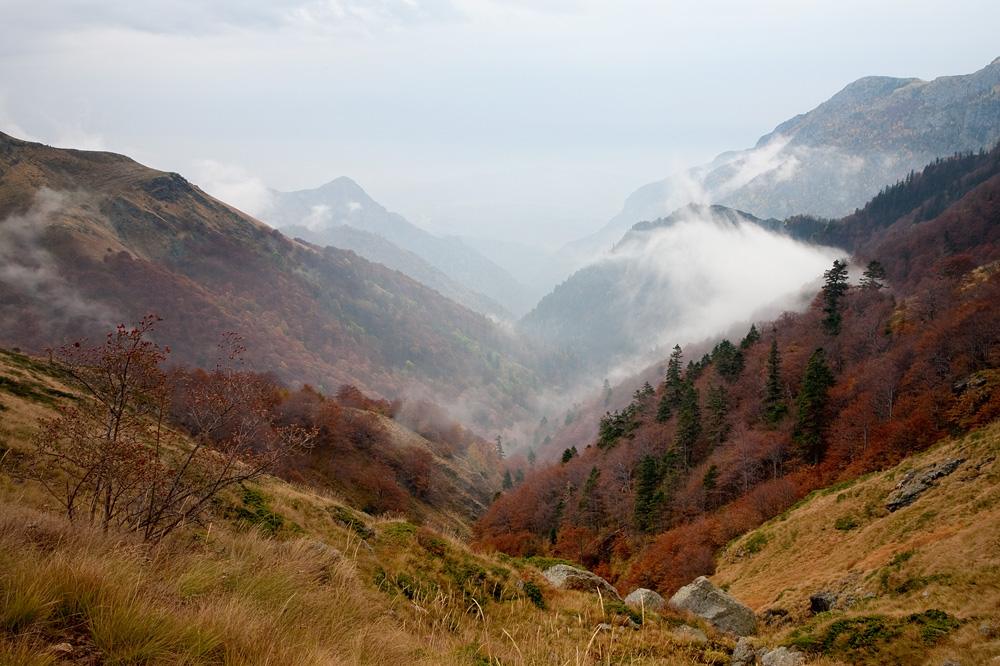
- Interactive map of Dzhendema
- Location: Balkan mountains, Bulgaria
- Area: 42.2 square kilometres (16.3 sq mi)
- Established: March 28, 1953

Dzhendema or Djendema (Bulgarian: Джендема [d͡ʒɛnˈdɛmɐ]) is a nature reserve in the Balkan Mountains in Bulgaria. The Southern Dzhendem, or just Dzhendema, occupies the southern slopes of Mount Botev 42°41′41″N 24°54′41″E. It was established as reserve on March 28, 1953. Djendema encompasses 42.2 km2, and is the largest reserve in the mountain and the second largest reserve in Bulgaria. It is centred on a granite extrusion combined with limestone outcroppings to form a labyrinth of steep slopes; deep, narrow gorges, massive rock cliffs, and huge waterfalls. Djendema Reserve shelters beech and fir forests and large meadows with unique sub-alpine grassy species and communities. Because of its specific geological and climatic conditions, the area is rich in endemic species and rare plants. One could take several days to cross Djendema. The name is derived from Ottoman Turkish cehennem 'hell'.

There is also so called Northern Dzhendem or the Northern Djendem located on the north slope of Mount Botev 42°44′48.79″N 24°55′41.34″E. It was declared a reserve on September 30, 1983. It has a total area of 16.1 km2 and is the highest reserve in the Balkan Ranges, encompassing a wild and inaccessible section of the central part of the mountain. The reserve includes the nearly vertical northern slopes, approximately 10 kilometres wide with an average height of 900 metres, looming rock tiers, short and steep watersheds, overhanging cliffs, rock bridges, jaded cornices, deep precipices, numerous waterfalls, as well as grassy terraces. At low altitudes, ancient beech and fir forests cover almost two-thirds of the steeply sloped Northern Djendem. It also contains sub-alpine grassy and forest habitats. Many rare wildlife species have found their last refuge in this impenetrable natural forest, which is home to an unusual community of Siberian juniper, myrtle-leaf rhododendron and blueberry, as well as the only known location of Urumov’s campion in the world. The Northern Djendem is home to the Balkan chamois (alpine goat), brown bear, grey wolf, red deer, roe, golden eagle, peregrine falcon, and wallcreeper. The two Djendems are alpine objects for many climbers.
