= Botev Peak =

Peak in the Balkan Mountains, Bulgaria

- връх Ботев
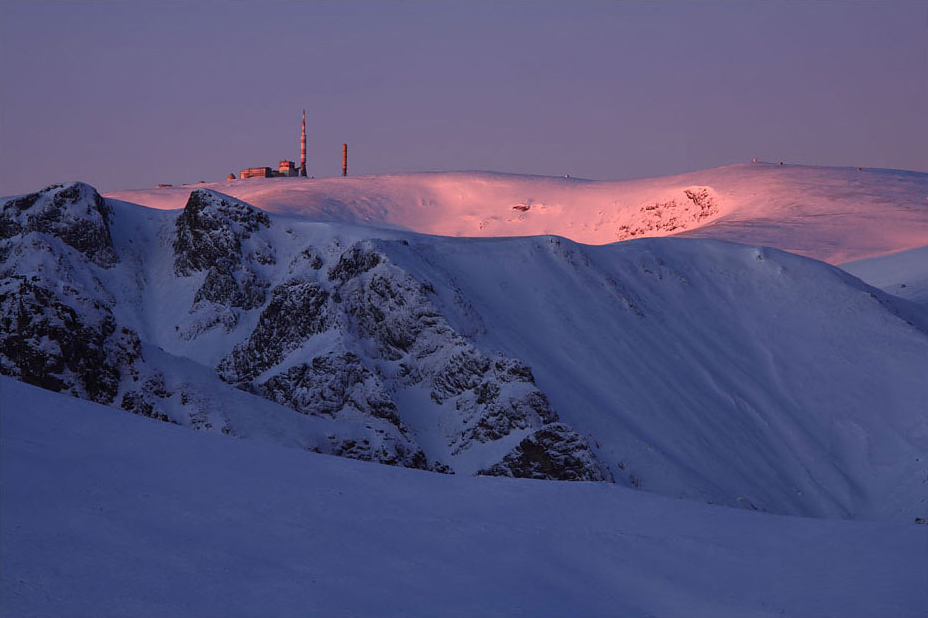
- Botev Peak

Highest point
- Elevation: 2,376 m (7,795 ft)
- Prominence: 1,567 m (5,141 ft)
- Listing: Ultra
- Coordinates: 42°43′03″N 24°55′00″E

Geography
- Location within Bulgaria
- Country: Bulgaria
- Protected area: Central Balkan National Park
- Parent range: Balkan Mountains

Climbing
- Easiest route: a two and a half hour climb from Ray Resthouse (1,560 m) at the south foot

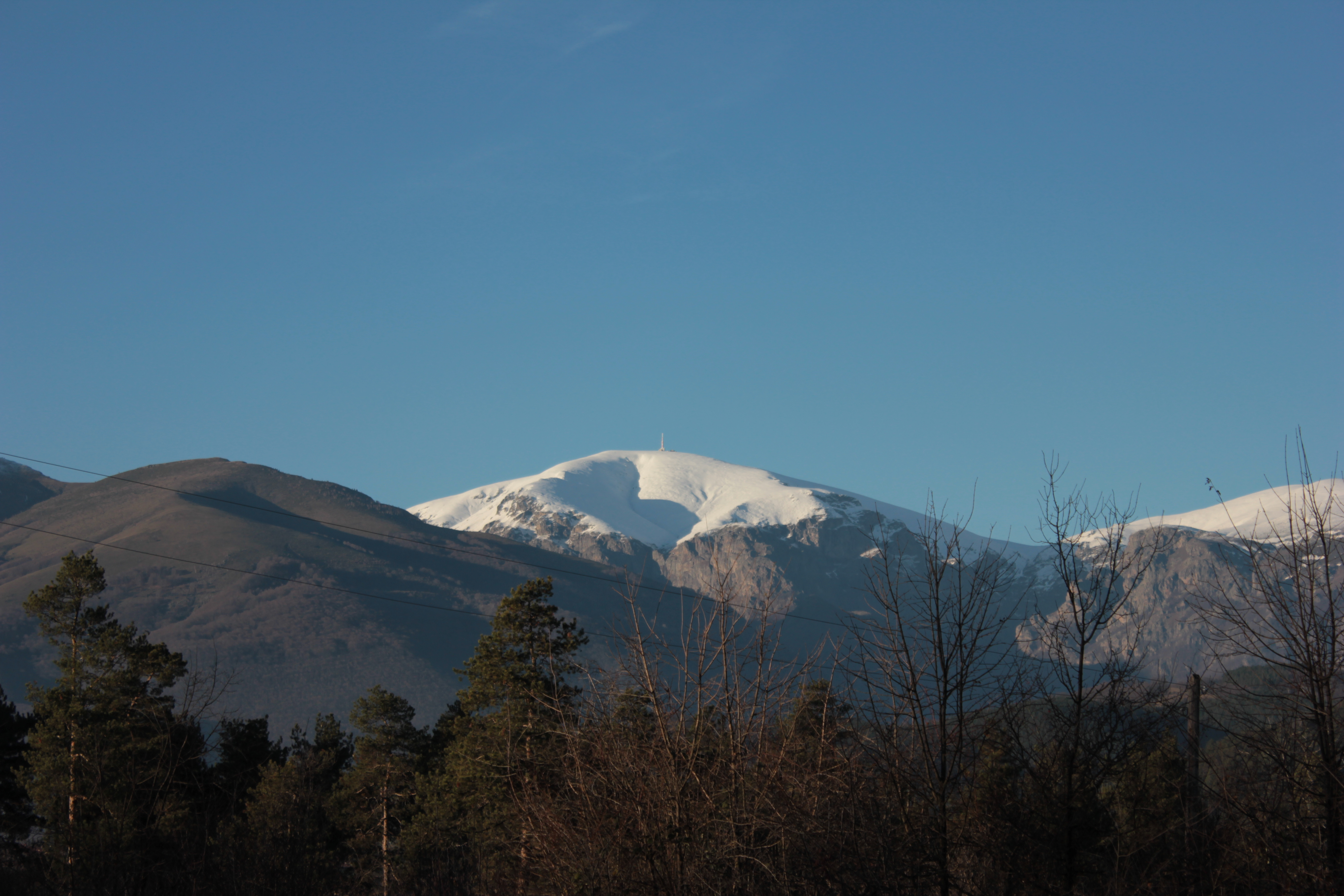
View of Botev Peak from I-6 road (Bulgaria)

Botev Peak (Bulgarian: (връх) Ботев Bulgarian pronunciation: [(vrɤx) ˈbɔtɛf]) is, at 2,376 metres (7,795 ft) above sea level, the highest peak of the Balkan Mountains in southeastern Europe. It is located close to the geographic centre of Bulgaria, and is part of the Central Balkan National Park.

Until 1950, when it was renamed in honour of Bulgarian poet and revolutionary Hristo Botev, the peak was called Yumrukchal (Юмрукчал, from Ottoman Turkish Yumrukçal, 'a fist-like peak').

A weather station and a radio tower (opened on 10 July 1966) that covers 65% of the country are located on Botev Peak. The average temperature is −8.9 °C (16.0 °F) in January and 7.9 °C (46.2 °F) in July.

"Botev Peak" is the main facility of Bulgarian FM and TV broadcasting network. The situation at the top near the geographical center of Bulgaria contribute to national radio broadcasts and television broadcast here to cover more than 65% throughout the country, also in parts of Romania and Turkey.

The massif is mainly composed of granite rocks dating from the oligocene — a complex of medium acid volcanics — latites, andesites, shoshonites.

The flat ridge relief around Botev and Triglav is isolated with high slopes, which from the north (North Jendem) descend steeply from 2000 – 2200 m down, and from the south (South Jendem) — from 1800 – 1900 m.

== Channels listed by frequency ==
=== Analogue radio ===
Radio programme	FM frequency	ERP	Remarks
BNR Hristo Botev	92,20 MHz	117.5 kW (10 kW TRP)	1966-2003: 72.44 MHz
			1977-1998: 71.66 MHz (to 1992: Programme Orpheus/Znanie; to 1998: Radio Plovdiv)
BNR Horizont	100,90 MHz	117.5 kW (10 kW TRP)	1966-2003: 70.88 MHz

=== Digital television (since 2013) ===
TV programme	Channel	ERP	Remarks
National Multiplex 2 - "Pleven" Zone (bTV, Nova, BNT 1, BNT 2, BNT HD, Bulgaria On Air)	57	20 kW (3 kW TRP)	Radiation in direction North

=== Analogue television (prior to 2013) ===
TV programme	Channel	ERP	Remarks
BNT 1	11	~100 kW (20 kW TRP)	
bTV	24	~100 kW (40 kW TRP)	1975-2000: Efir 2

== See also ==
- List of European ultra-prominent peaks
