= Ancient and Primeval Beech Forests of the Carpathians and Other Regions of Europe =

UNESCO World Heritage Site

UNESCO World Heritage Site
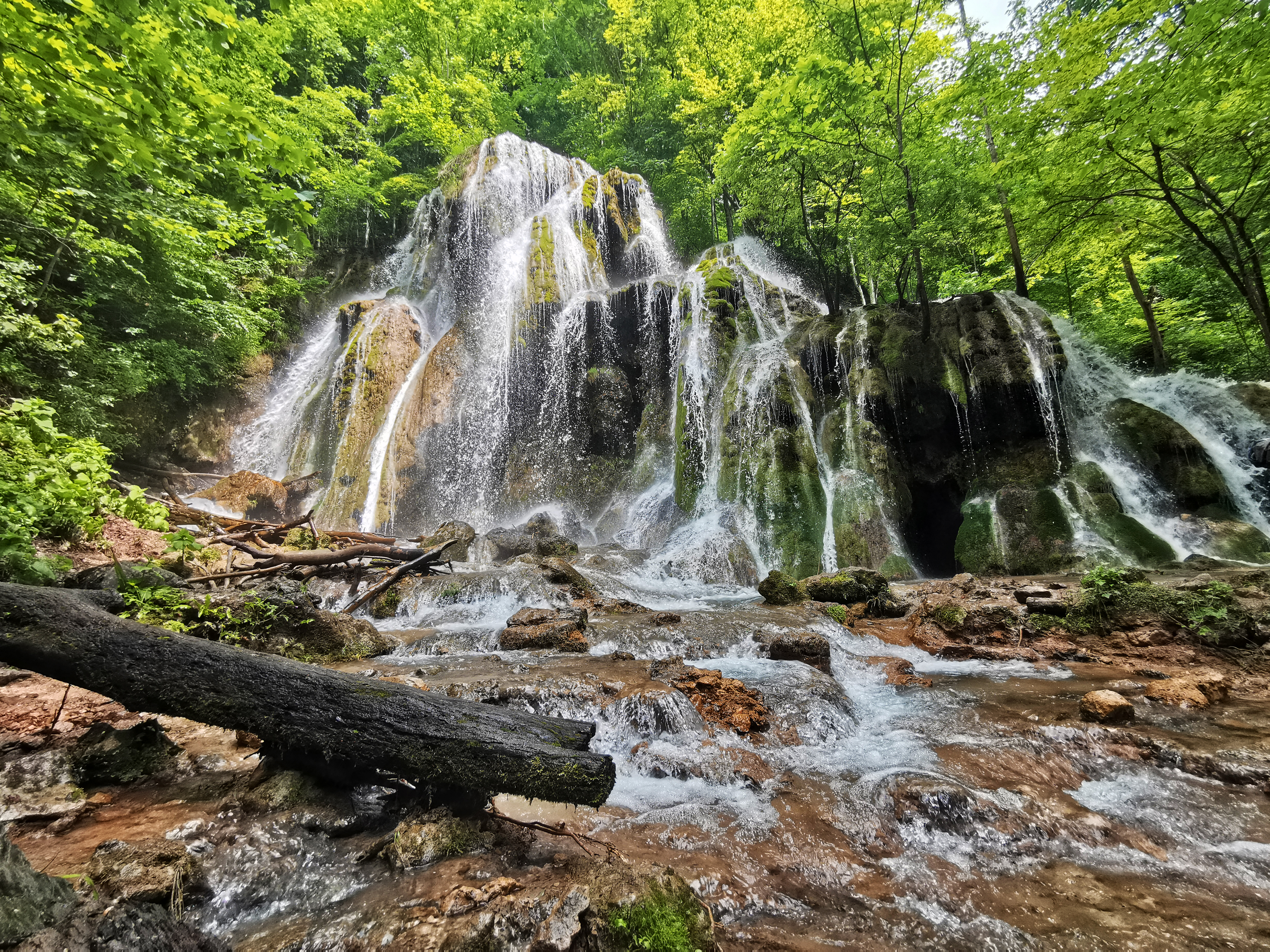
- Beușnița Waterfall in Nera Gorge-Beușnița National Park, Romania
- Interactive map of Ancient and Primeval Beech Forests of the Carpathians and Other Regions of Europe
- Location: (see map)
- Criteria: Natural:
- Reference: 1133
- Inscription: 2007 (31st Session)
- Extensions: 2011, 2017, 2021, 2023

Ancient and Primeval Beech Forests of the Carpathians and Other Regions of Europe is a transnational serial nature UNESCO World Heritage Site, encompassing 93 component parts (forests of European beech, Fagus sylvatica) in 18 European countries. Together, the sites protect the largest and least disturbed forests dominated by the beech tree. In many of these stands, especially those in the Carpathians, beech forests have persisted without interruption or interference since the last ice age. These sites document the undisturbed postglacial repopulation of the species.

== Carpathian region ==
The Primeval Beech Forests of the Carpathians include ten separate massifs located along the 185 km (115 mi) long axis from the Rakhiv mountains and Chornohora ridge in Ukraine over the Poloniny Ridge (Slovakia) to the Vihorlat Mountains in Slovakia. The Ancient Beech Forests of Germany includes five locations, covers 4,391 hectares and were added in 2011.

The Carpathian site covers a total area of 77,971.6 ha (192,672 acres), out of which only 29,278.9 ha (72,350 acres) are part of the actual preserved area, while the rest is considered a "buffer zone". Primeval Beech Forests of the Carpathians cover areas of Zakarpattia and Prešov Regions. Over 70% of the site is located in Ukraine. The area includes two national parks, and some habitat controlled areas, mostly in Slovakia. Both national parks, along with a neighboring area in Poland, compose a separate biosphere reserve, the East Carpathian Biosphere Reserve. Besides Havešová, Rožok, and Stužica (all of them located in Bukovské vrchy), there is a fourth component situated in Slovakia, named Kyjovský prales of Vihorlat. Ukrainian locations include Chornohora, Kuziy-Trybushany, Maramarosh, (Note: "Maramorosh" changed to "Maramarosh".) Stuzhytsia–Uzhok, Svydovets, and Uholka–Shyrikyi Luh. Only a few of the ten components are accessible to visitors. Stužica is the only one of three locations in Bukovské vrchy (Slovakia) with available hiking trails. In 2017, UNESCO extended the site, adding forests in Albania, Austria, Belgium, Bulgaria, Croatia, Italy, Romania, Slovenia, and Spain. In 2021 UNESCO extended the site again adding forests in Bosnia and Herzegovina, Czechia, France, Italy, North Macedonia, Poland, Slovakia and Switzerland. Then, in 2023 further minor extensions were made, including an expansion to the Dürrenstein-Lassingtal site in Austria, and the addition of a forest at Paklenica National Park in Croatia, including former Paklenica National Park-Suva draga-Klimenta and -Oglavinovac-Javornik.

== List of component parts ==
Map of the distribution of Fagus sylvatica in Europe (green)

Location of Ancient and Primeval Beech Forests (component clusters) in Europe

The component parts included in the site as of December 2023 are:

Country	Serial ID No. or ID	Component part	Component cluster	Property [ha]	Buffer zone [ha]	Year inscrib.	Centre point coordinates
Carpathian Beech Forest Region
Ukraine	1133quinquies-001 UA_CBR	Chornohora		2,476.80	12,925.00	2007	48°8′25″N 24°23′35″E
Ukraine	1133quinquies-002 UA_CBR	Kuziy-Trybushany		1,369.60	3,163.40	2007	47°56′21″N 24°8′26″E
Ukraine	1133quinquies-003 UA_CBR	Maramarosh		2,243.60	6,230.40	2007	47°56′12″N 24°19′35″E
Ukraine	1133quinquies-004 UA_UNNP	Stuzhytsia-Uzhok		2,532.00	3,615.00	2007	49°4′58″N 22°35′45″E (Note: Geographic coordinates corrected from "N49 4 14 E22 3 1" to N49°4’58’’ E22°35’45’’)
Ukraine	1133quinquies-005 UA_CBR	Svydovets		3,030.50	5,639.50	2007	48°11′21″N 24°13′37″E
Ukraine	1133quinquies-006 UA_CBR	Uholka-Shyrokyi Luh (Note: "Uholka-Shyrikyi Luh" corrected to "Uholka-Shyrokyi Luh".)		11,860.00	3,301.00	2007	48°18′22″N 23°41′46″E
Ukraine	1133quinquies-063 UA_GORG	Gorgany		753.48	4,637.59	2017	48°28′19″N 24°17′58″E
Ukraine	1133quinquies-066 UA_SYNE	Darvaika	Synevyr	1,588.46	312.32	2017	48°29′14″N 23°44′56″E
Ukraine	1133quinquies-067 UA_SYNE	Kvasovets	Synevyr	561.62	333.63	2017	48°23′6″N 23°42′46″E
Ukraine	1133quinquies-068 UA_SYNE	Strymba	Synevyr	260.65	191.14	2017	48°27′11″N 23°47′48″E
Ukraine	1133quinquies-069 UA_SYNE	Vilshany	Synevyr	454.31	253.85	2017	48°21′20″N 23°39′36″E
Ukraine	1133quinquies-070 UA_ZACH	Irshavka	Zacharovanyi Krai	93.97	1,275.44	2017	48°27′9″N 23°5′23″E
Ukraine	1133quinquies-071 UA_ZACH	Velykyi Dil	Zacharovanyi Krai	1,164.16	1,275.44	2017	48°25′21″N 23°9′42″E
Slovakia	1133quinquies-089 SK-POLO-01	Havešová	Poloniny	167.88	6,474.84	2007; 2021*	49°0′35″N 22°20′14″E
Slovakia	1133quinquies-090 SK-POLO-02	Rožok	Poloniny	74.37	1,138.89	2007; 2021*	48°58′40″N 22°27′52″E
Slovakia	1133quinquies-091 SK-POLO-03	Stužica – Bukovské Vrchy	Poloniny	1,742.47	5,694.84	2007; 2021*	49°5′3″N 22°29′42″E
Slovakia	1133quinquies-092 SK-POLO-04	Udava	Poloniny	455.82	814.69	2007; 2021*	49°10′31″N 22°13′39″E
Slovakia	1133quinquies-093 SK-VIHO-02	Vihorlat		1,553.06	854.08	2007; 2021*	48°54′56″N 22°11′13″E
Romania	1133quinquies-043 RO_NERE	Cheile Nerei-Beușnița		4,292.27	5,959.87	2017	44°54′19″N 21°48′40″E
Romania	1133quinquies-044 RO_SINC	Sinca secular forest (Codrul secular Șinca)		338.24	445.76	2017	45°40′0″N 25°10′14″E
Romania	1133quinquies-045 RO_SLAT	Slătioara secular forest (Codrul secular Slătioara)		609.12	429.43	2017	47°26′36″N 25°37′39″E
Romania	1133quinquies-046 RO_COZI	Cozia Massif	Cozia	2,285.86	2,408.83	2017	45°19′54″N 24°19′32″E
Romania	1133quinquies-047 RO_COZI	Lotrisor	Cozia	1,103.30	2,408.83	2017	45°17′43″N 24°15′33″E
Romania	1133quinquies-048 RO_DOMO	Domogled-Coronini-Bedina	Domogled – Valea Cernei	5,110.63	51,461.28	2017	44°56′31″N 22°28′7″E
Romania	1133quinquies-049 RO_DOMO	Iauna Craiovei	Domogled – Valea Cernei	3,517.36	51,461.28	2017	45°6′31″N 22°34′41″E
Romania	1133quinquies-050 RO_DOMO	Ciucevele Cernei	Domogled – Valea Cernei	1,104.27	51,461.28	2017	45°14′40″N 22°49′23″E
Romania	1133quinquies-051 RO_TIBL	Izvorul Șurii	Groșii Țibleșului	210.55	563.57	2017	47°32′59″N 24°11′9″E
Romania	1133quinquies-052 RO_TIBL	Preluci	Groșii Țibleșului	135.82	563.57	2017	47°32′5″N 24°13′13″E
Romania	1133quinquies-053 RO_IZVO	Izvoarele Nerei		4,677.21	2,494.83	2017	45°7′21″N 22°3′59″E
Romania	1133ter-046 RO_STRA	Strâmbu Băiuț (Note: "Strimbu Băiuț" changed to "Strâmbu Băiuț".)		598.14	713.09	2017	47°37′33″N 24°4′23″E
Poland	1133quinquies-085 PL-BIES-01	Border Ridge and Górna Solinka valley (Note: "Gorna Solinka" corrected to "Górna Solinka".)	Bieszczady	1,506.05	24,330.52	2021	49°5′58″N 22°33′24″E
Poland	1133quinquies-086 PL-BIES-02	Połonina Wetlińska and Smerek (Note: "Polonina Wetlinska" corrected to "Połonina Wetlińska".)	Bieszczady	1,178.03	24,330.52	2021	49°10′51″N 22°30′12″E
Poland	1133quinquies-087 PL-BIES-03	Terebowiec stream valley	Bieszczady	201.00	24,330.52	2021	49°5′37″N 22°43′29″E
Poland	1133quinquies-088 PL-BIES-04	Wołosatka stream valley	Bieszczady	586.66	24,330.52	2021	49°4′1″N 22°44′41″E
Polonic-Podoloc-Moldovan Beech Forest Region
Ukraine	1133quinquies-064 UA_ROZT	Roztochchia (Note: "Roztochya" corrected to "Roztochchia".)		384.81	598.21	2017	49°57′44″N 23°38′58″E
Ukraine	1133quinquies-065 UA_SATA	Satanіvska Dacha		212.01	559.37	2017	49°10′26″N 26°14′56″E
Baltic Beech Forest Region
Germany	1133quinquies-007 DE_JASM	Jasmund		492.50	2,510.50	2011	54°32′53″N 13°38′43″E
Germany	1133quinquies-008 DE_SERR	Serrahn		268.10	2,568.00	2011	53°20′24″N 13°11′52″E
Germany	1133quinquies-009 DE_GRUM	Grumsin		590.10	274.30	2011	52°59′11″N 13°53′44″E
Subatlantic-Hercynic Beech Forest Region
Germany	1133quinquies-010 DE_HAIN	Hainich		1,573.40	4,085.40	2011	51°04′43″N 10°26′08″E
Germany	1133quinquies-011 DE_KELL	Kellerwald		1,467.10	4,271.40	2011	51°08′43″N 8°58′25″E
Czech Republic	1133quinquies-075 CZ-JIZE-01	Jizera Mountains		444.81	2,279.40	2021	50°51′30″N 15°9′20″E
France	1133quinquies-077 FR-GRAN-01	Grand Ventron		319.00	1,328.00	2021	47°58′20″N 6°56′23″E
Switzerland	1133quinquies-073 CH-BETT-01	Bettlachstock Forest (Forêt de la Bettlachstock)		195.43	1,094.16	2021	47°13′22″N 7°24′43″E
Alpic Beech Forest Region
Austria	1133quinquies-014 AT_DUER	Dürrenstein-Lassingtal		3,685.27	3,089.78	2017; 2023*	47°46′12″N 15°2′51″E
Austria	1133quinquies-015 AT_KALK	Hintergebirge	Kalkalpen	2,946.20	14,197.24	2017	47°44′58″N 14°28′56″E
Austria	1133quinquies-016 AT_KALK	Bodinggraben	Kalkalpen	890.89	14,197.24	2017	47°47′14″N 14°21′12″E
Austria	1133quinquies-017 AT_KALK	Urlach	Kalkalpen	264.82	14,197.24	2017	47°48′15″N 14°14′22″E
Austria	1133quinquies-018 AT_KALK	Wilder Graben	Kalkalpen	1,149.75	14,197.24	2017	47°50′00″N 14°26′1″E
Switzerland	1133quinquies-074 CH-LODA-01	Forest reserves of Lodano, Busai and Soladino Valleys		806.78	2,330.74	2021	46°15′49″N 8°39′11″E
France	1133quinquies-076 FR-CHAP-01	Chapitre		371.30	41.65	2021	44°38′4″N 5°59′55″E
Atlantic Beech Forest Region
Belgium	1133quinquies-019 BE_SONI	Forest Reserve “Joseph Zwaenepoel”	Sonian Forest (Forêt de Soignes)	187.34	4,650.86	2017	50°45′23″N 4°25′00″E
Belgium	1133quinquies-020 BE_SONI	Grippensdelle A	Sonian Forest (Forêt de Soignes)	24.11	4,650.86	2017	50°46′54″N 4°25′36″E
Belgium	1133quinquies-021 BE_SONI	Grippensdelle B	Sonian Forest (Forêt de Soignes)	37.38	4,650.86	2017	50°47′1″N 4°25′57″E
Belgium	1133quinquies-022 BE_SONI	Réserve forestière du Ticton A	Sonian Forest (Forêt de Soignes)	13.98	4,650.86	2017	50°44′3″N 4°26′13″E
Belgium	1133quinquies-023 BE_SONI	Réserve forestière du Ticton B	Sonian Forest (Forêt de Soignes)	6.50	4,650.86	2017	50°43′37″N 4°25′51″E
Moesian-Balcanic Beech Forest Region
Albania	1133quinquies-012 AL_LUMI	Lumi i gashit		1,261.52	8,977.48	2017	42°25′36″N 20°05′45″E
Albania	1133quinquies-013 AL_RRAJ	Rrajca		2,129.45	2,569.75	2017	41°12′11″N 20°30′2″E
North Macedonia	1133quinquies-084 MN-DLAB-01	Dlaboka Reka		193.27	234.70	2021	41°45′47″N 20°35′16″E
Bulgaria	1133quinquies-024 BG_BALK	Boatin Reserve	Central Balkan	1,226.88	851.22	2017	42°48′10″N 24°16′9″E
Bulgaria	1133quinquies-025 BG_BALK	Tsarichina Reserve	Central Balkan	1,485.81	1,945.99	2017	42°46′32″N 24°24′18″E
Bulgaria	1133quinquies-026 BG_BALK	Kozya stena Reserve	Central Balkan	644,43	289.82	2017	42°47′47″N 24°31′2″E
Bulgaria	1133quinquies-027 BG_BALK	Steneto Reserve (Note: "Stara reka Reserve" corrected to "Steneto Reserve".)	Central Balkan	2,466.10	1,762.01	2017	42°44′43″N 24°42′26″E
Bulgaria	1133quinquies-028 BG_BALK	Stara Reka Reserve (Note: "Severen Dzhendem Reserve" corrected to "Stara Reka Reserve".)	Central Balkan	591.20	1,480.04	2017	42°42′11″N 24°49′8″E
Bulgaria	1133quinquies-029 BG_BALK	Dzhendema Reserve	Central Balkan	1,774.12	2,576.63	2017	42°41′44″N 24°58′23″E
Bulgaria	1133quinquies-030 BG_BALK	Severen Dzhendem Reserve	Central Balkan	926.37	1,066.47	2017	42°44′44″N 24°56′5″E
Bulgaria	1133quinquies-031 BG_BALK	Peeshti skali Reserve (Note: "Peesh skali" corrected to "Peeshti skali".)	Central Balkan	1,049.10	968.14	2017	42°45′54″N 25°4′29″E
Bulgaria	1133quinquies-032 BG_BALK	Sokolna Reserve	Central Balkan	824.90	780.55	2017	42°41′52″N 25°8′18″E
Illyric Beech Forest Region
Croatia	1133quinquies-033 HR_HAJD	Forest reserves Hajdučki i Rožanski kukovi		1,289.11	9,869.25	2017	44°45′59″N 15°0′39″E
Croatia	1133quinquies-034 HR_PAKL-01	Paklenica National Park (formerly PNP – Suva draga-Klimenta and PNP – Oglavinovac-Javornik)		2,036.81	824.86	2017; 2023*	44°20′26″N 15°30′1″E
Slovenia	1133quinquies-055 SI_KROK	Krokar		74.50	47.90	2017	45°32′31″N 14°46′8″E
Slovenia	1133quinquies-056 SI_SNEZ	Snežnik-Ždrocle		720.24	128.80	2017	45°35′5″N 14°27′19″E
Bosnia and Herzegovina	1133quinquies-072 BH-JANJ-01	Prašuma Janj		295.04	380.74	2021	44°8′48″N 17°16′52″E
Central Mediterranean Beech Forest Region
Italy	1133quinquies-035 IT_ABRU	Cervara Valley (Valle Cervara)	Abruzzo, Lazio & Molise	119.70	751.61	2017	41°49′56″N 13°43′43″E
Italy	1133quinquies-036 IT_ABRU	Selva Moricento	Abruzzo, Lazio & Molise	192.70	751.61	2017	41°50′49″N 13°42′20″E
Italy	1133quinquies-037 IT_ABRU	Coppo del Morto	Abruzzo, Lazio & Molise	104.71	415.51	2017	41°51′37″N 13°50′48″E
Italy	1133quinquies-038 IT_ABRU	Coppo del Principe	Abruzzo, Lazio & Molise	194.49	446.62	2017	41°47′15″N 13°44′39″E
Italy	1133quinquies-039 IT_ABRU	Fondillo Valley (Val Fondillo)	Abruzzo, Lazio & Molise	325.03	700.95	2017	41°45′15″N 13°53′9″E
Italy	1133quinquies-081 IT-POLL-01	Cozzo Ferriero	Pollino National Park	95.75	2,851.83	2017; 2021*	39°54′19″N 16°6′4″E
Italy	1133quinquies-082 IT-POLL-02	Pollinello	Pollino National Park	477.94	2,851.83	2021	39°53′43″N 16°11′54″E
Italy	1133quinquies-083 IT-VALL-01	Infernale Valley (Valle Infernale)		320.79	2,191.36	2021	38°7′55″N 15°57′41″E
Italy	1133quinquies-079 IT-FUMB-01	Falascone	Umbra Forest (Foresta Umbra)	254.30	3,486.29	2017; 2021*	41°48′21″N 15°58′41″E
Italy	1133quinquies-080 IT-FUMB-02	Pavari-Sfilzi	Umbra Forest (Foresta Umbra)	667.13	3,486.29	2021	41°50′20″N 16°1′25″E
Italy	1133quinquies-040 IT_CIMI	Monte Cimino		57.54	87.96	2017	42°24′31″N 12°12′11″E
Italy	1133quinquies-041 IT_RASC	Monte Raschio		73.73	54.75	2017	42°10′25″N 12°9′40″E
Italy	1133quinquies-042 IT_SASS	Sasso Fratino		781.43	6,936.64	2017	43°50′40″N 11°48′11″E
Pyrenaic-Iberian Beech Forest Region
Spain	1133quinquies-057 ES_AYLL	Tejera Negra	Beech forests of Ayllón (Hayedos de Ayllón)	255.52	13,880.86	2017	41°14′43″N 3°23′19″W (Note: Latitude corrected from "N41 143" to N41°14’43’’)
Spain	1133quinquies-058 ES_AYLL	Montejo	Beech forests of Ayllón (Hayedos de Ayllón)	71.79	13,880.86	2017	41°6′44″N 3°29′58″W
Spain	1133quinquies-059 ES_NAVA	Lizardoia	Beech forests of Navarra (Hayedos de Navarra)	63.97	24,494.52	2017	43°0′23″N 1°6′46″W
Spain	1133quinquies-060 ES_NAVA	Aztaparreta	Beech forests of Navarra (Hayedos de Navarra)	171.06	24,494.52	2017	42°54′39″N 0°48′58″W
Spain	1133quinquies-061 ES_PICO	Cuesta Fría (Note: "Cuesta Fria" changed to "Cuesta Fría".)	Beech forests of Picos de Europa (Hayedos de Picos de Europa)	213.65	14,253.00	2017	43°10′21″N 4°59′16″W
Spain	1133quinquies-062 ES_PICO	Canal de Asotin	Beech forests of Picos de Europa (Hayedos de Picos de Europa)	109.58	14,253.00	2017	43°10′16″N 4°53′21″W
France	1133quinquies-078 FR-MASS-01	Massane		239.50	1,432.30	2021	42°28′58″N 3°1′45″E

* Only boundary modification.

Udava (Bukovské Vrchy, Slovakia) was created by modifying the boundary of Stužica before. Falascone (Italy) in turn was named previously Umbra Forest (Foresta Umbra).

This is a transnational serial nature UNESCO World Heritage Site, encompassing 94 component parts (forests) in 18 European countries. The total area of component parts is 99,947.81 ha (246,976.4 acres), including buffer zones 396,223.61 ha (979,089.9 acres). The largest total area of component parts is in Ukraine and Romania – 53% total (41% including buffer zones).

== Forms of protection ==
Component parts of this property overlap more or less with various protected areas like national parks, nature reserves, Natura 2000 network.
Abbreviations:
C – count of component parts in a given cluster
N – overlapping with Natura 2000 areas

Country	Component cluster	C	Protected area	N	Region
Albania	Lumi i Gashit	1	Strict nature reserve of Gashi River		Kukës
Albania	Rrajca	1	Shebenik – Jabllanicë National Park		Elbasan
Austria	Dürrenstein-Lassingtal	1	Wilderness Area Dürrenstein	Yes	Lower Austria
Austria	Kalkalpen	4	Kalkalpen National Park	Yes	Upper Austria
Belgium	Sonian Forest (Forêt de Soignes)	5	3 strict forest reserves within Sonian Forest Protected Landscape – “Joseph Zwaenepoel”, Grippensdelle and Ticton	Yes	Flanders, Brussels Capital Region, Wallonia
Bosnia and Herzegovina	Prašuma Janj	1	Prašuma Janj strict nature reserve		Bosanska Krajina
Bulgaria	Central Balkan	9	9 strict reserves in the Central Balkan National Park – Boatin, Dzhendema, Kozya stena, Peeshti skali, Severen Dzhendem, Sokolna, Stara reka, Steneto and Tsarichina	Yes	Lovech, Plovdiv, Stara Zagora, Gabrovo (central Balkan Mountains)
Croatia	Hajdučki i Rožanski kukovi	1	Hajdučki and Rožanski Kukovi strict reserve within Northern Velebit National Park	Yes	Lika-Senj
Croatia	Paklenica National Park	1	Paklenica National Park	Yes	Lika-Senj, Zadar (Dinaric region, or Dinaric Alps)
Czech Republic	Jizera Mountains	1	Jizerskohorské bučiny National Nature Reserve	Yes	Liberec
France	Chapitre	1	Chapitre-Petit-Buëch biological strict reserve	Yes	Provence-Alpes-Côte d'Azur
France	Grand Ventron	1	Massif du Grand Ventron National Nature Reserve	Yes	Grand Est
France	Massane	1	Massane National Nature Reserve	Yes	Occitanie
Germany	Grumsin	1	Schorfheide-Chorin Biosphere Reserve	Yes	Brandenburg
Germany	Hainich	1	Hainich National Park	Yes	Thuringia
Germany	Jasmund	1	Jasmund National Park	Yes	Mecklenburg-Vorpommern
Germany	Kellerwald	1	Kellerwald-Edersee National Park	Yes	Hesse
Germany	Serrahn	1	Müritz National Park	Yes	Mecklenburg-Vorpommern
Italy	Abruzzo, Lazio & Molise	5	Abruzzo, Lazio and Molise National Park	Yes	Abruzzo
Italy	Umbra Forest (Foresta Umbra)	2	Strict reserves within Gargano National Park – Sfilzi, Falascone and Foresta Umbra	Yes	Apulia
Italy	Monte Cimino	1	Regional Natural Monument and municipal strict reserve	Yes	Lazio
Italy	Monte Raschio	1	Regional Natural Park Bracciano-Martignano	Yes	Lazio
Italy	Pollino National Park	2	Cozzo Ferriero and Pollinello strict reserves within Pollino National Park	Yes	Calabria, Basilicata
Italy	Sasso Fratino	1	Sasso Fratino strict reserve in Foreste Casentinesi, Monte Falterona, Campigna National Park	Yes	Emilia-Romagna, Tuscany
Italy	Infernale Valley (Valle Infernale)	1	Valle Infernale strict reserve within Aspromonte National Park	Yes	South Calabria
North Macedonia	Dlaboka Reka	1	Forest reserves within Mavrovo National Park		Mavrovo and Rostuša and Gostivar
Poland	Bieszczady	4	Bieszczady National Park, East Carpathian Biosphere Reserve	Yes	Podkarpackie Voivodeship
Romania	Cheile Nerei-Beușnița	1	Strictly protected zone of the Cheile Nerei-Beușnița National Park	Yes	Caraș-Severin
Romania	Șinca secular forest (Codrul secular Șinca)	1	Strictly protected through the forest management plan	Yes	Brașov
Romania	Slătioara secular forest (Codrul secular Slătioara)	1	Part of Codrul Secular Slătioara forest reserve, Secular Meadows Todirescu floristic reserve	Yes	Suceava
Romania	Cozia	2	Cozia National Park	Yes	Vâlcea
Romania	Domogled – Valea Cernei	3	Domogled-Valea Cernei National Park	Yes	Mehedinți, Caraș-Severin, Gorj
Romania	Groșii Țibleșului	2	Strictly protected through the forest management plan	Yes	Maramureș
Romania	Izvoarele Nerei	1	Izvoarele Nerei strict reserve within Semenic-Cheile Carașului National Park	Yes	Caraș-Severin
Romania	Strâmbu Băiuț	1	Strictly protected through the forest management plan	Yes	Maramureș
Slovakia	Poloniny	4	National nature reserves Stužica, Jarabá skala, Pľaša and Borsukov vrch (Stužica – Bukovské Vrchy), Rožok, Havešová, nature reserve Udava within Poloniny National Park, East Carpathian Biosphere Reserve	Yes	Prešov
Slovakia	Vihorlat	1	Vihorlat national nature reserve within Vihorlat Protected Landscape Area	Yes	Prešov
Slovenia	Krokar	1	Forest reserve Virgin forest Krokar	Yes	Kočevje
Slovenia	Snežnik–Ždrocle	1	Snežnik–Ždrocle forest reserve	Yes	Inner Carniola
Spain	Beech forests of Ayllón (Hayedos de Ayllón)	2	Tejera Negra: Sierra Norte de Guadalajara Natural Park, Montejo: Sierra del Rincón Biosphere Reserve	Yes	Castilla-La Mancha
Spain	Beech forests of Navarra (Hayedos de Navarra)	2	Integral (strict) reserves of Lizardoia and Aztaparreta	Yes	Navarre
Spain	Beech forests of Picos de Europa (Hayedos de Picos de Europa)	2	Picos de Europa National Park, Biosphere Reserve	Yes	Castile and León
Switzerland	Bettlachstock Forest (Forêt de la Bettlachstock)	1	Forest reserve Bettlachstock–Hasenmatt		Canton of Solothurn
Switzerland	Forest reserves of Lodano, Busai and Soladino Valleys	1	Lodano Valley forest reserve, Busai and Soladino Valleys forest reserve		Canton of Ticino
Ukraine	Chornohora	1	Carpathian Biosphere Reserve		Zakarpattia
Ukraine	Kuziy – Trybushany	1	Carpathian Biosphere Reserve		Zakarpattia
Ukraine	Maramarosh	1	Carpathian Biosphere Reserve		Zakarpattia
Ukraine	Stuzhytsia – Uzhok	1	Uzh National Nature Park		Zakarpattia
Ukraine	Svydovets	1	Carpathian Biosphere Reserve		Zakarpattia
Ukraine	Uholka – Shyrokyi Luh	1	Carpathian Biosphere Reserve		Zakarpattia
Ukraine	Synevyr	4	Synevyr National Nature Park		Zakarpattia
Ukraine	Zacharovanyi Krai	2	Zacharovanyi Krai National Nature Park		Zakarpattia
Ukraine	Gorgany	1	Gorgany Nature Reserve		Ivano-Frankivsk
Ukraine	Roztochchya	1	Roztochchia Nature Reserve, Roztochchia Biosphere Reserve		Lviv
Ukraine	Satanіvska Dacha	1	Podilski Tovtry National Nature Park		Khmelnytskyi

== Tentative list ==
This forest is placed on the World Heritage Tentative list as a proposal for the expansion of the Ancient and Primeval Beech Forests of the Carpathians and Other Regions of Europe site:

Montenegro

- Virgin Forest Reserve in NP Biogradska Gora

Serbia

- Fruška gora, Kopaonik, Tara

== Gallery ==
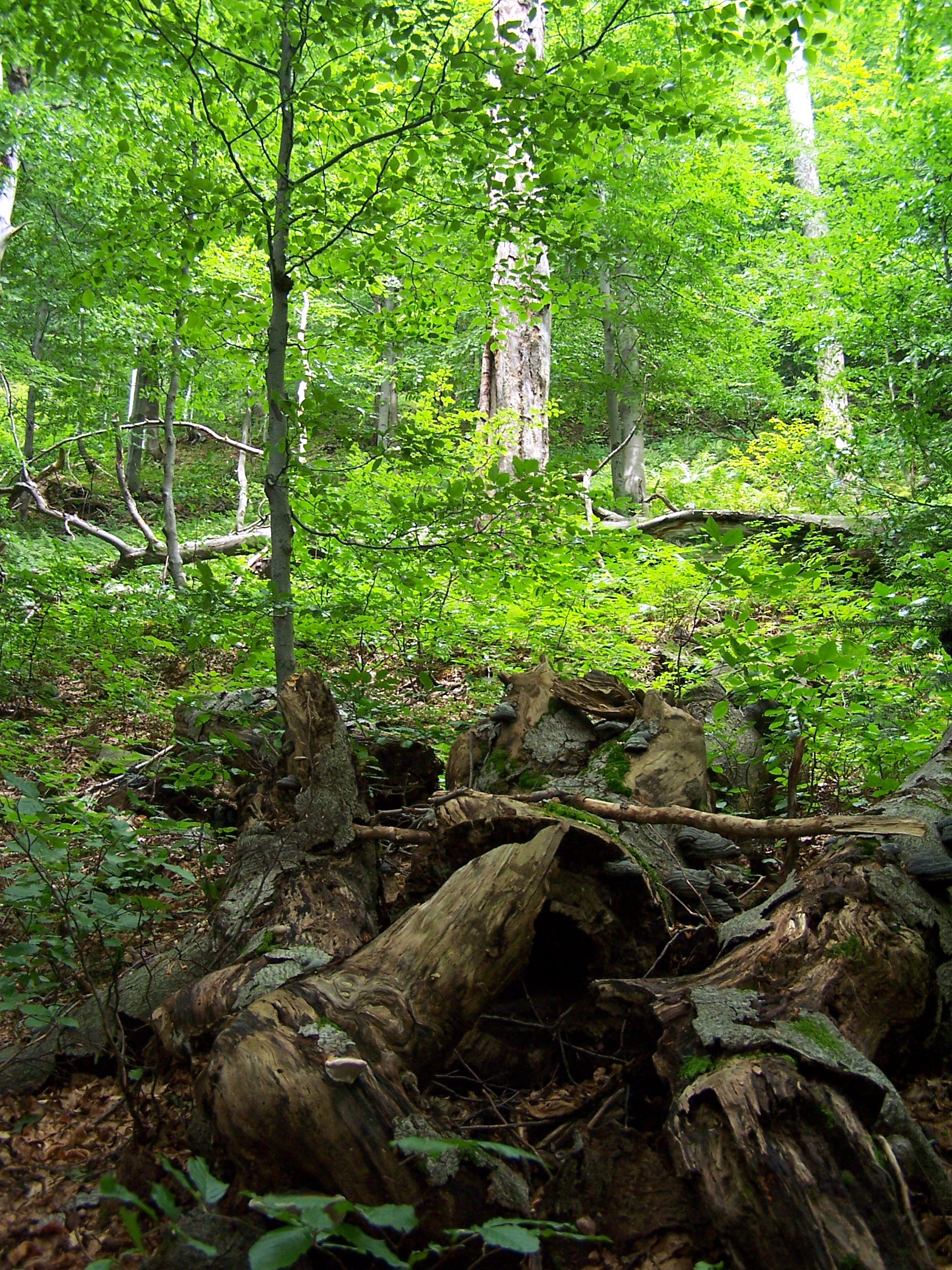
Forest in Stuzica

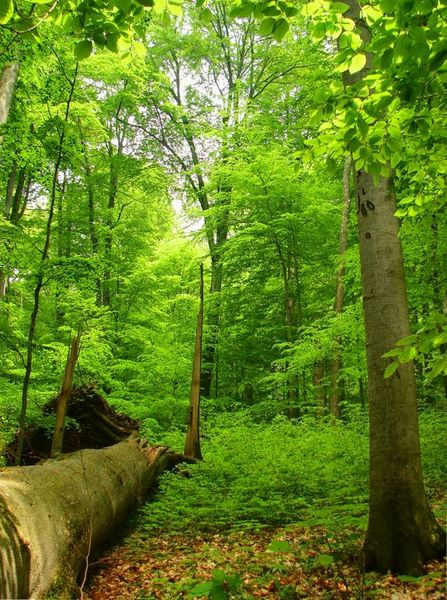
Havešová

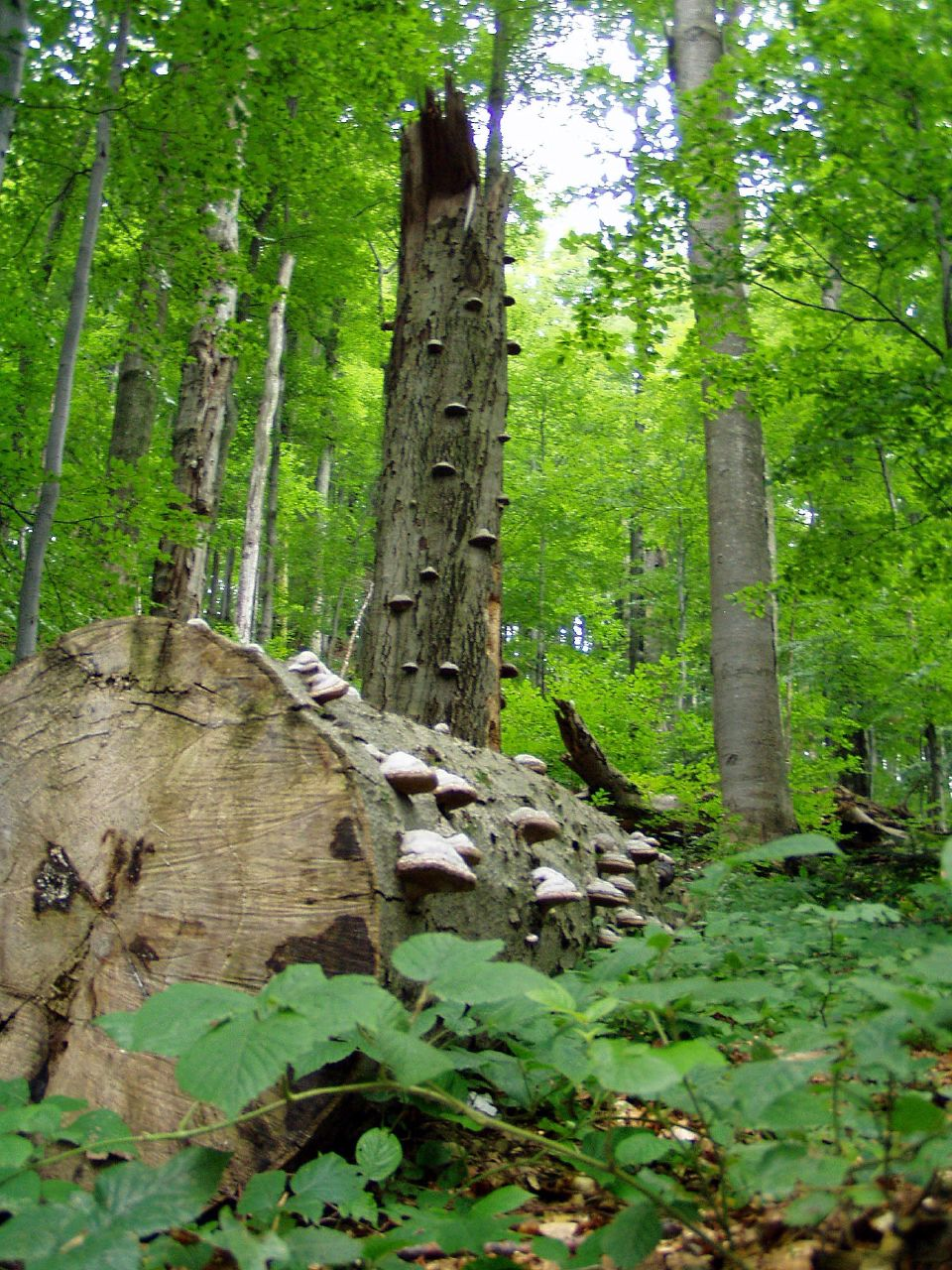
Stužica

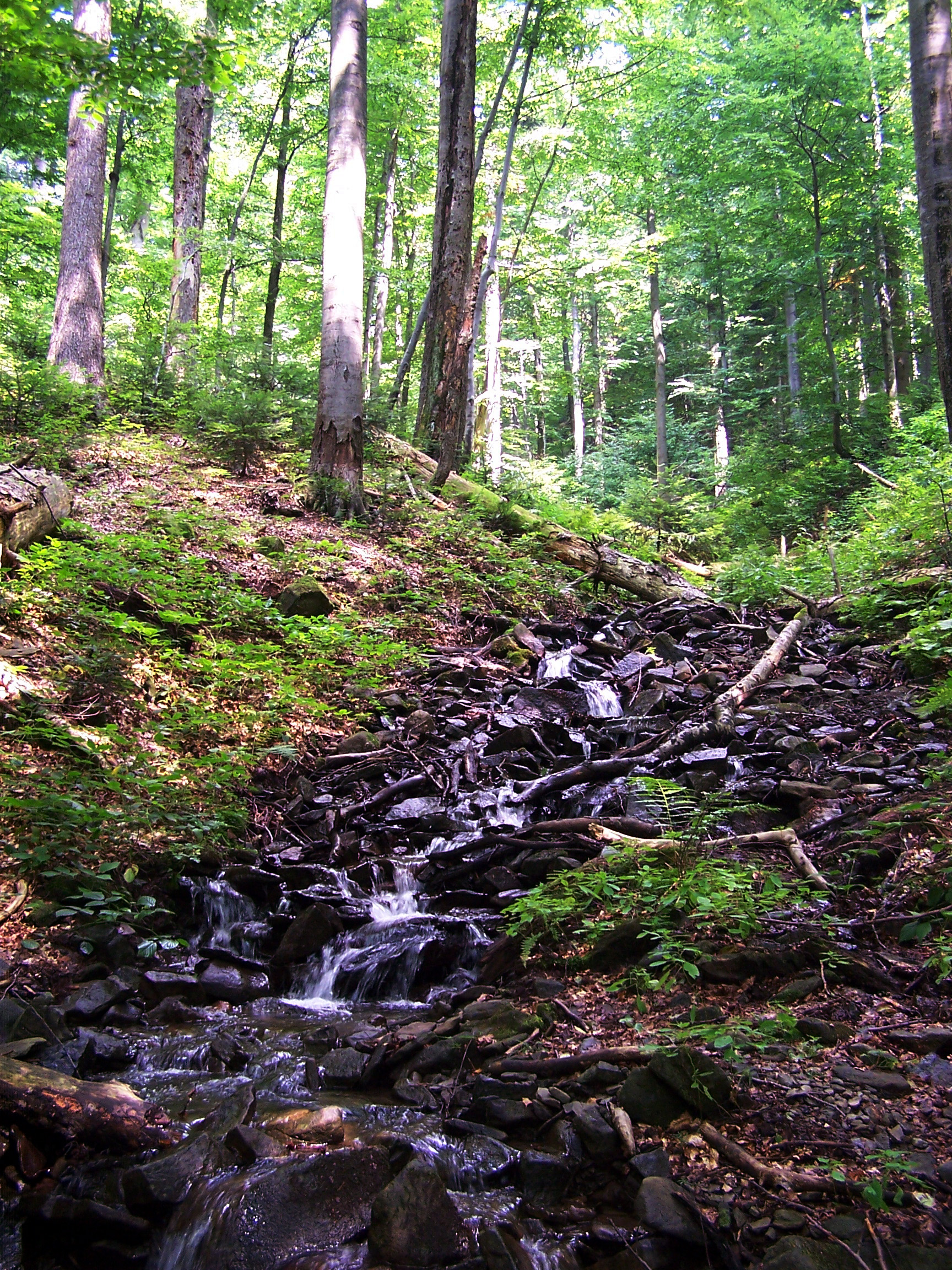
Freshwater stream in Stužica

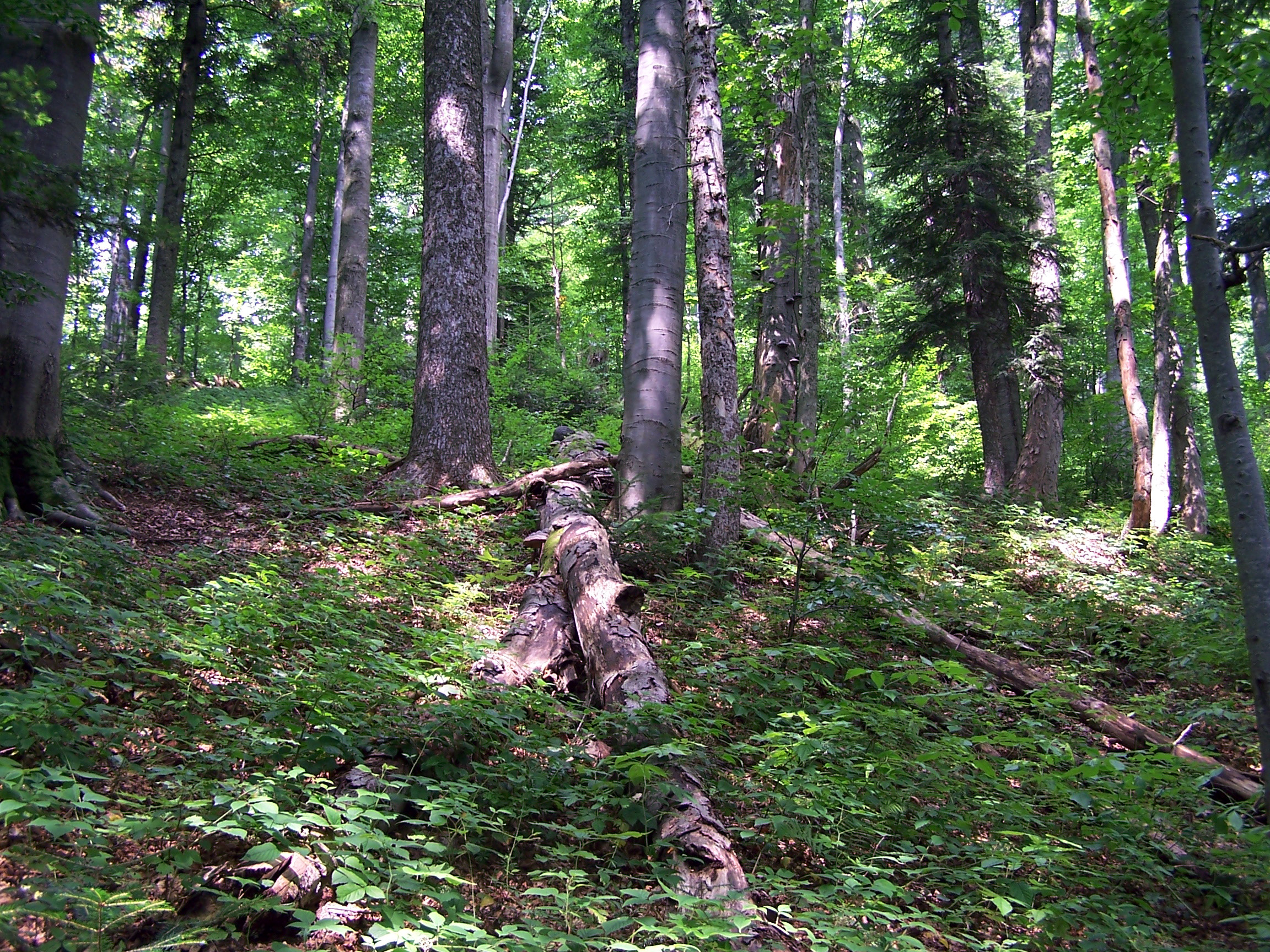
Stužica

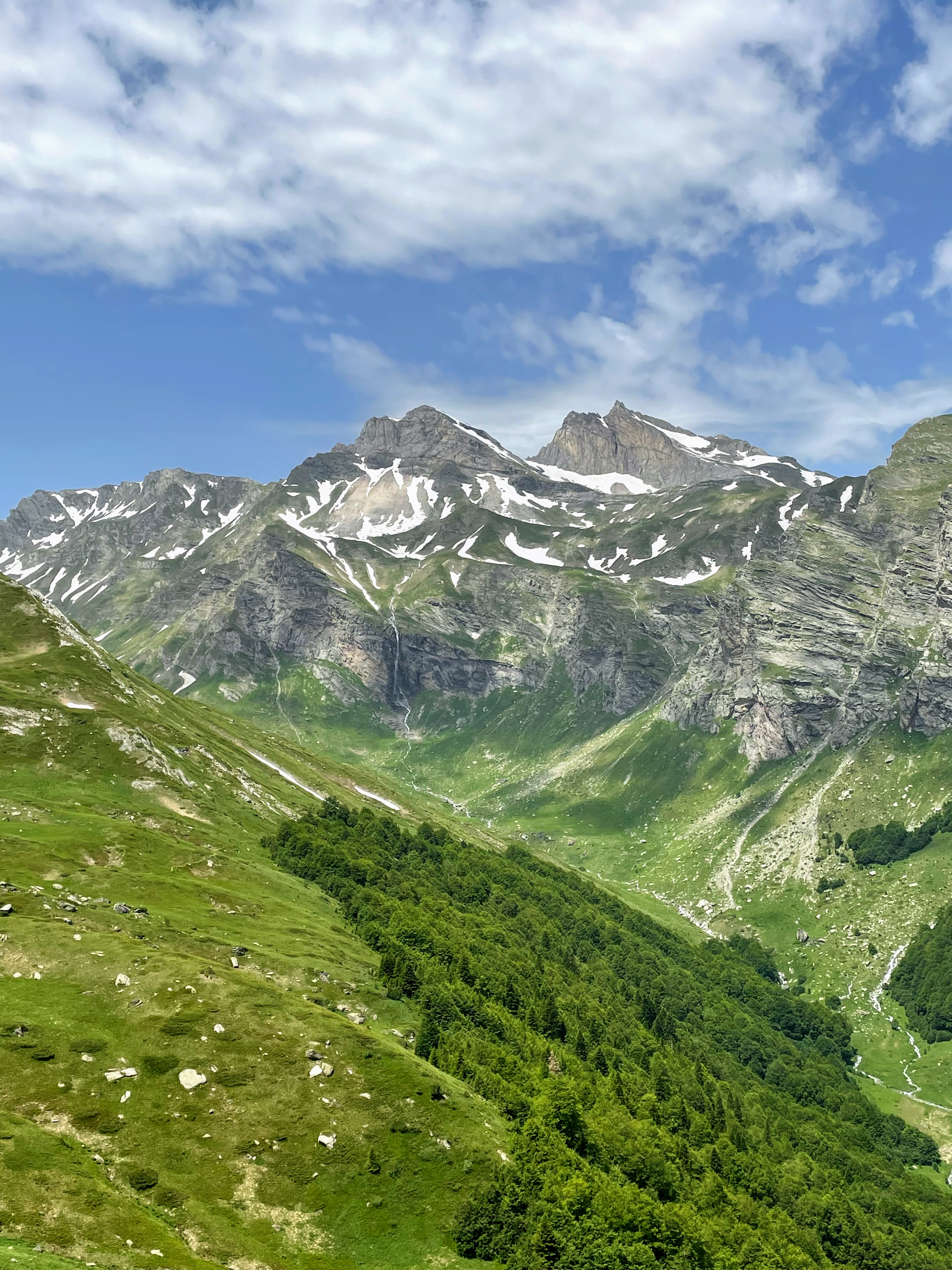
Dlaboka Reka
