= Monte Raschio =

Volcanic mountain in Oriolo Romano, Lazio, Italy

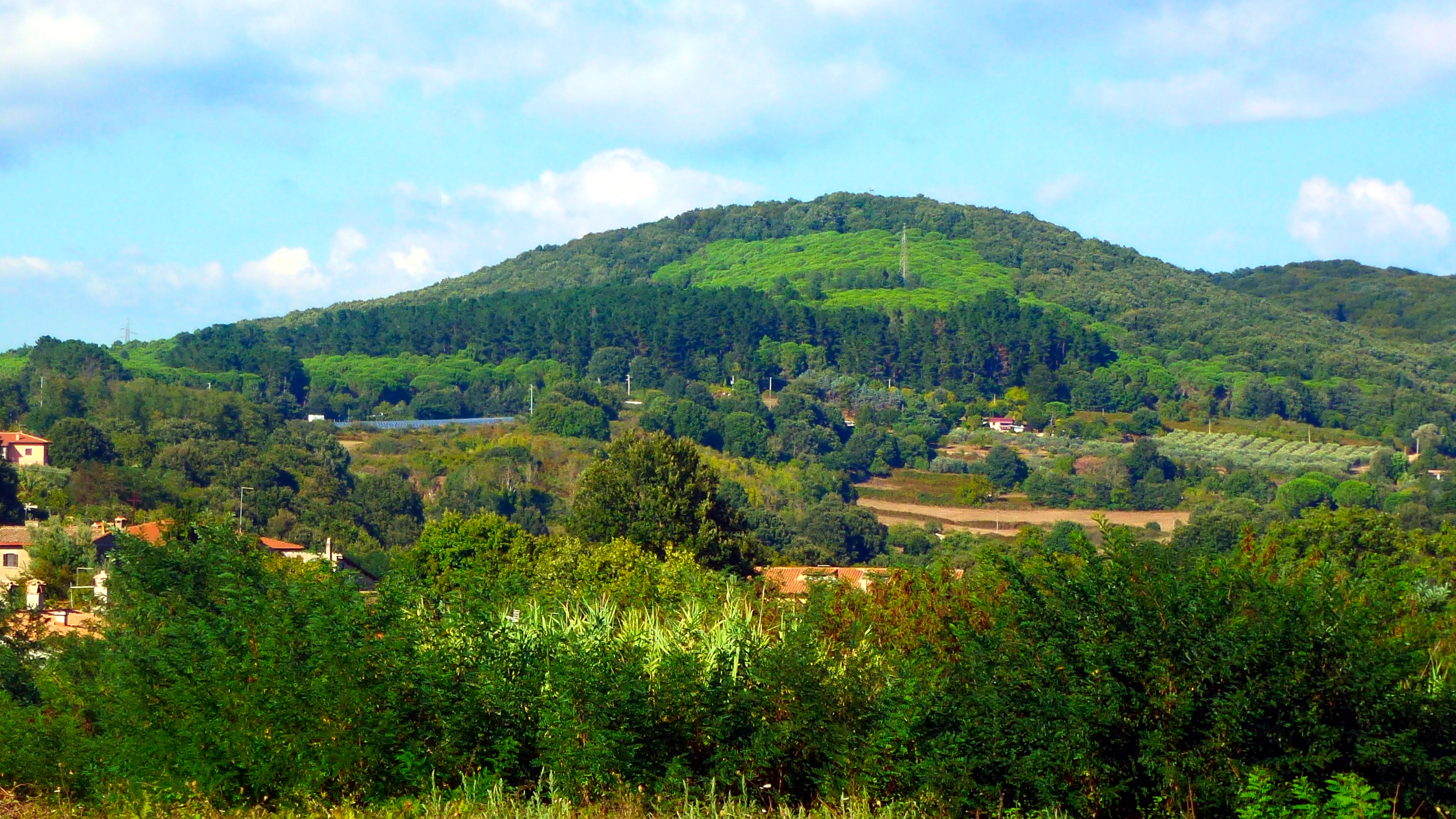

Highest point
- Elevation: 552 m (1,811 ft)
- Coordinates: 42°10′26″N 12°09′18″E

Geography
- Country: Italy
- Region: Lazio
- Parent range: Monti Sabatini in the Lazio Apennines

Geology
- Last eruption: Pleistocene

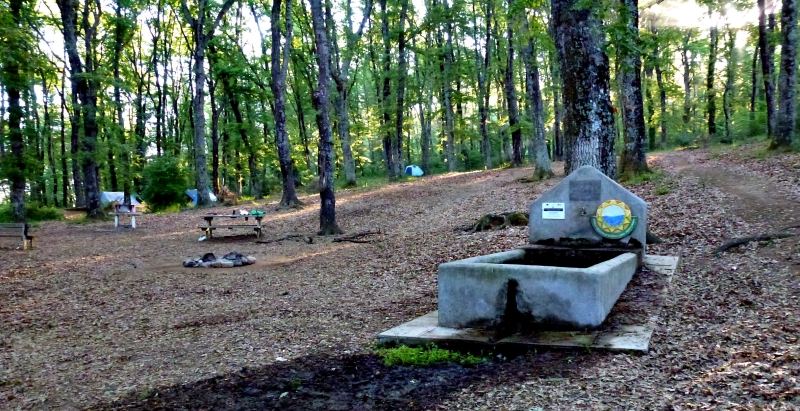
Picnic area of the Cerratina

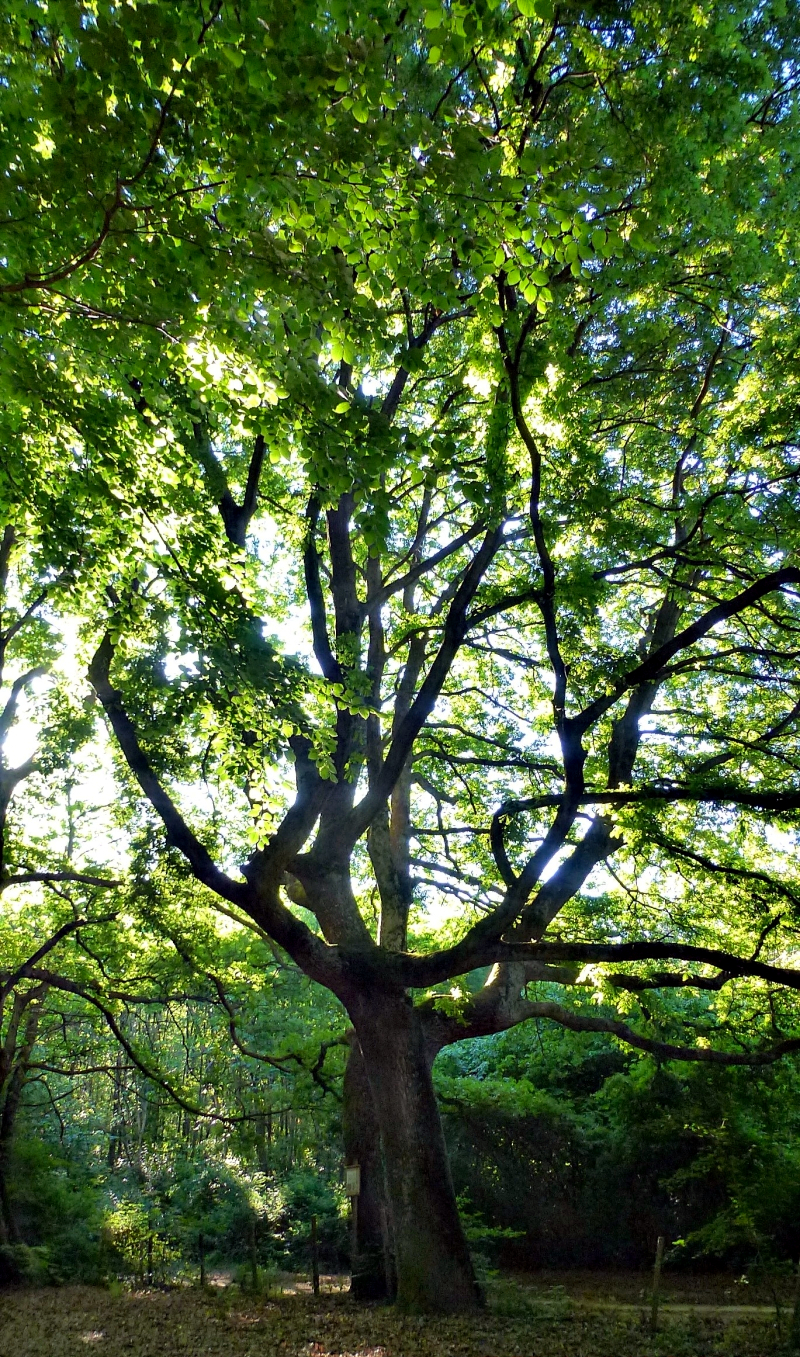
The Cerrone

Monte Raschio (552 m a.s.l.) is a mountain belonging to the mountain group of the Monti Sabatini. Located in the municipality of Oriolo Romano in the Province of Viterbo within the Parco naturale regionale di Bracciano-Martignano, it is a state-owned forest complex covering approximately 150 ha, transferred from the former ASFD (State Forestry Agency) to the Region of Lazio toward the end of the 1970s.

== Geology ==
Monte Raschio is composed of cones of scoria, particularly tuff and pozzolana, the final result of the eruptive activity of the ancient Sabatino volcano, which began approximately 600,000 years ago and ceased around 40,000 years ago.

== History ==
From documents dating back to the founding of Oriolo Romano in the 1500s, the place was called Monteraschi and was owned by the Santacroce family, who used it as a pasture.

For centuries, it represented an important local economic resource derived from the civic use rights of firewood collection for entitled individuals and the production of charcoal. The last forestry interventions on the beech forest date back to the late 1950s when the property was still owned by the Altieri family.

In the beech forest, traces of ancient charcoal kilns are still evident in some depressions, particularly the remains of one of the largest and a mule track located north of the protected area at the border between the localities “Crocetta” and “Poggio carrarecce”.

Another significant economic activity was the exploitation of volcanic materials: until the 1960s, on the southern slope of the beech forest, an open-pit quarry of “bruciore,” a particular reddish lapilli tufaceous material used for paving carrarecce, was active.

== Environment ==
The territory of the forest complex is included in two protected areas:

- SIC IT6010034 Faggete di Monte Raschio e Oriolo: the SIC spans the municipalities of Oriolo Romano and Bassano Romano, encompassing the UNESCO site of the Faggeta vetusta depressa di Monte Raschio. The SIC is a forest of beech extending over 712 ha.
- Faggeta vetusta depressa di Monte Raschio: a UNESCO natural heritage site. It is a forest of beech covering 74 ha.

The habitats present at Monte Raschio, classified by the Habitats Directive for the designation of Natura 2000 sites, are:

- 9210 Beech forests of the Apennines with Taxus and Ilex (74 ha);
- 9260 Chestnut woodlands (55 ha Buffer Zone).

== Hiking ==
From the center of Oriolo Romano, following an 8 km hiking route, the Sentiero Monte Raschio CAI 175C, it is possible to reach the summit of Monte Raschio.

== See also ==
- Ancient and Primeval Beech Forests of the Carpathians and Other Regions of Europe
- Oriolo Romano

== Bibliography ==
- Cerulli, Andrea (2019). "Aspetti storico amministrativi, ambientali e gestionali forestali" [Historical-Administrative, Environmental, and Forest Management Aspects] (PDF). Parco Naturale Regionale di Bracciano-Martignano (in Italian). Bracciano.
