= Molln =

- Municipality
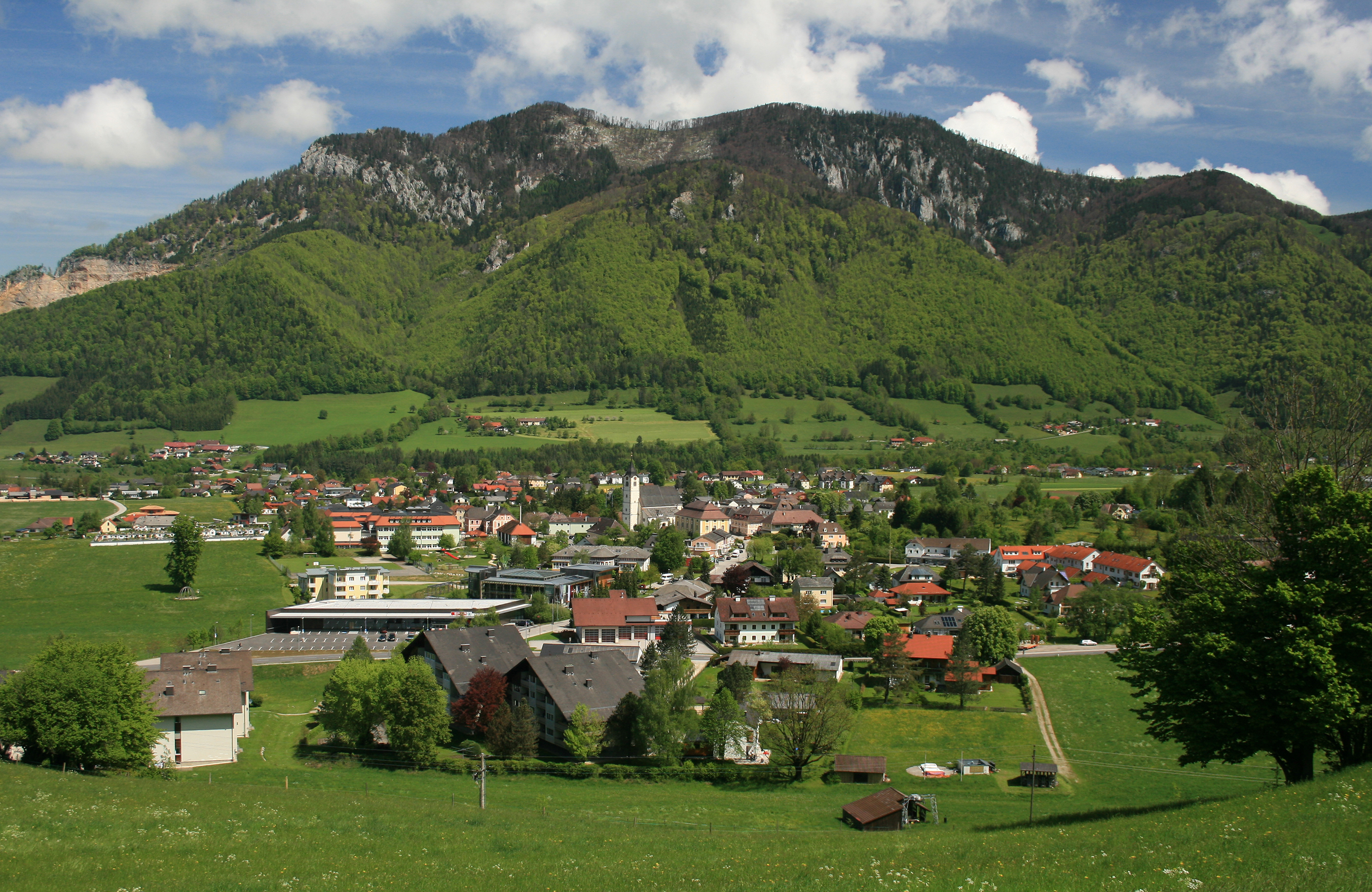

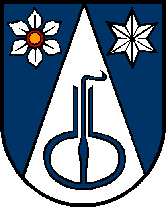
- Coat of arms

- Location within Austria
- Coordinates: 47°53′01″N 14°15′32″E
- Country: Austria
- State: Upper Austria
- District: Kirchdorf an der Krems

Government
  - Mayor: Andreas Russmann (SPÖ)

Area
  - Total: 191.43 km^{2} (73.91 sq mi)
- Elevation: 442 m (1,450 ft)

Population (2018-01-01)
  - Total: 3,653
  - Density: 19.08/km^{2} (49.42/sq mi)
- Time zone: UTC+1 (CET)
  - Summer (DST): UTC+2 (CEST)
- Postal code: 4591
- Area code: 07584
- Vehicle registration: KI
- Website: www.molln.at

Molln is a municipality in the district of Kirchdorf an der Krems in the Austrian state of Upper Austria. It is remembered as a place where there was a poacher battle in 1919 and four people were shot and killed.

== Geography ==
Molln lies in the Traunviertel. About 70 percent of the municipality is forest, and 20 percent is farmland.

Kalkalpen National Park including Central Europe's largest forested area is located in proximity to the municipality. Molln houses a visitor center.

== Natural Gas Reserve ==
Molln is currently prospected for a natural gas reserve of 24 km^{3} (270 TWh energy). Environmental effects of this are in dispute while energy security and inflation have reemerged as primary concerns in the EU.
