= Prašuma Janj =

Nature reserve in Bosnia and Herzegovina

- IUCN category Ia (strict nature reserve)
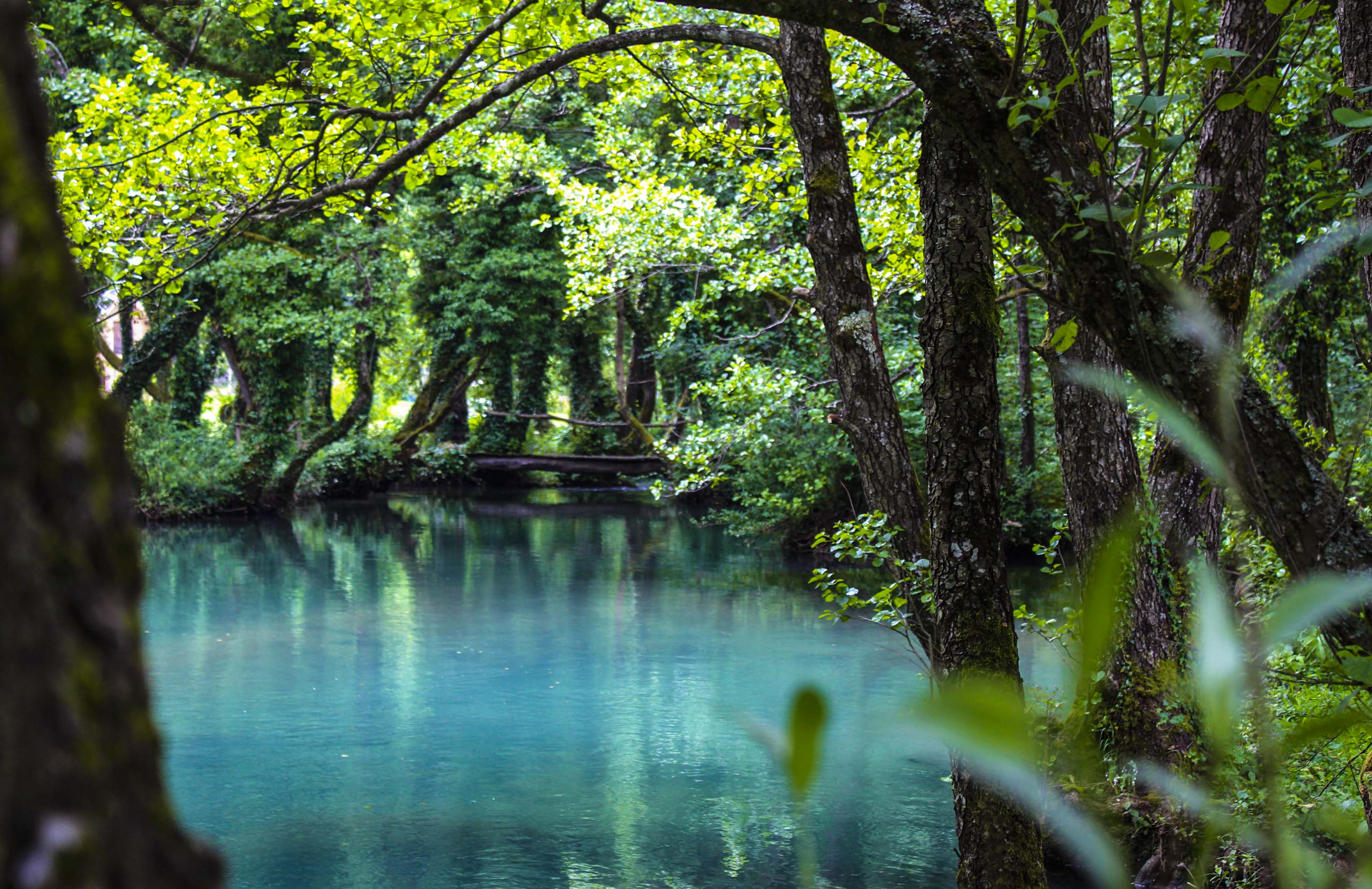
- Strict Nature Reserve Primeval Forest Janj
- Interactive map of Prašuma Janj
- Coordinates: 44°09′34″N 17°16′42″E
- Area: 2.95 km^{2} (1.14 sq mi)
- Established: 1954

Prašuma Janj is a protected nature area in Republika Srpska, Bosnia and Herzegovina. It covers the basin of the Janj river from Babići to the mouth in the Pliva river near Šipovo. The area was named a UNESCO World Heritage Site in 2021, under the designation Ancient and Primeval Beech Forests of the Carpathians and Other Regions of Europe.
