= Nationalpark Kalkalpen =

National park in Austria

Kalkalpen National Park
- IUCN category II (national park)
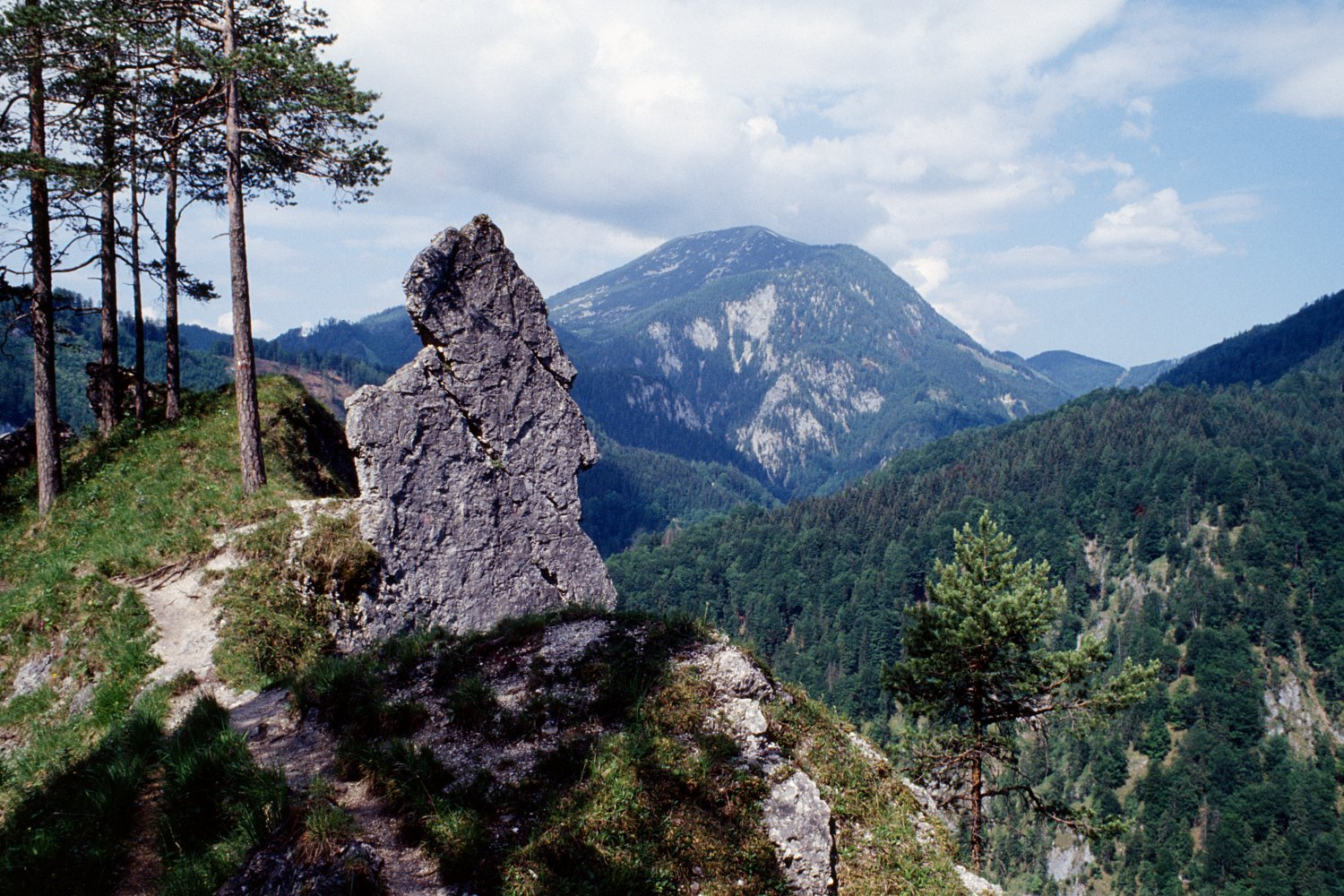
- The Reichraminger Hintergebirge, seen from Kalkalpen National Park

- Location within Austria
- Location: Northern Limestone Alps, Upper Austria, Austria
- Coordinates: 47°47′24″N 14°22′25″E
- Area: 20,825 hectares (51,460 acres)
- Established: 25 July 1997
- Website: www.kalkalpen.at

Ramsar Wetland
- Designated: 2 February 2004
- Reference no.: 1371

Kalkalpen National Park (in English literally Limestone Alps National Park) is a national park within the Northern Limestone Alps mountain range, located in the state of Upper Austria, Austria. The park was established in 1997. The ancient beech forests within the national park were added to the UNESCO World Heritage Site known as Ancient and Primeval Beech Forests of the Carpathians and Other Regions of Europe, because of their undisturbed nature and testimony to the ecological history of Europe since the Last Glacial Period.

== Description ==
The park contains Central Europe's largest forested area, as well the largest karst region in Austria. It opened on 25 July 1997, and has an area of 20,825 hectares (51,460 acres).

=== Features ===
Kalkalpen National Park has visitors centers in Molln, Ennstal, and at the Hengstpaßhütt near Rosenau. The Wurbauerkogel, a 21 metres (69 ft) high panorama view tower, is located near Windischgarsten. It is accessible by a chair lift and hiking paths. In clear weather 21 peaks of 2,000 metres (6,600 ft) or greater in elevation can be seen from Wurbauerkogel.

The park has numerous hiking, mountain biking, and horseback riding trails. The former Steyr Valley Railway, with sections now the Steyrtal rail trail, pass through the park in the Molln area. In the winter there are snowshoe hiking and alpine skiing routes.

The national park's lodge and seminar center is the 1907 Villa Sonnwend, located in Windischgarsten.

== See also ==
- Limestone Alps
- List of national parks in the Alps
- National parks of Austria
- Ennstal Alps
- Southern Limestone Alps
