= Uholka-Shyrokyi Luh primeval beech forest =

Primeval beech forest Uholka-Shyrokyi Luh
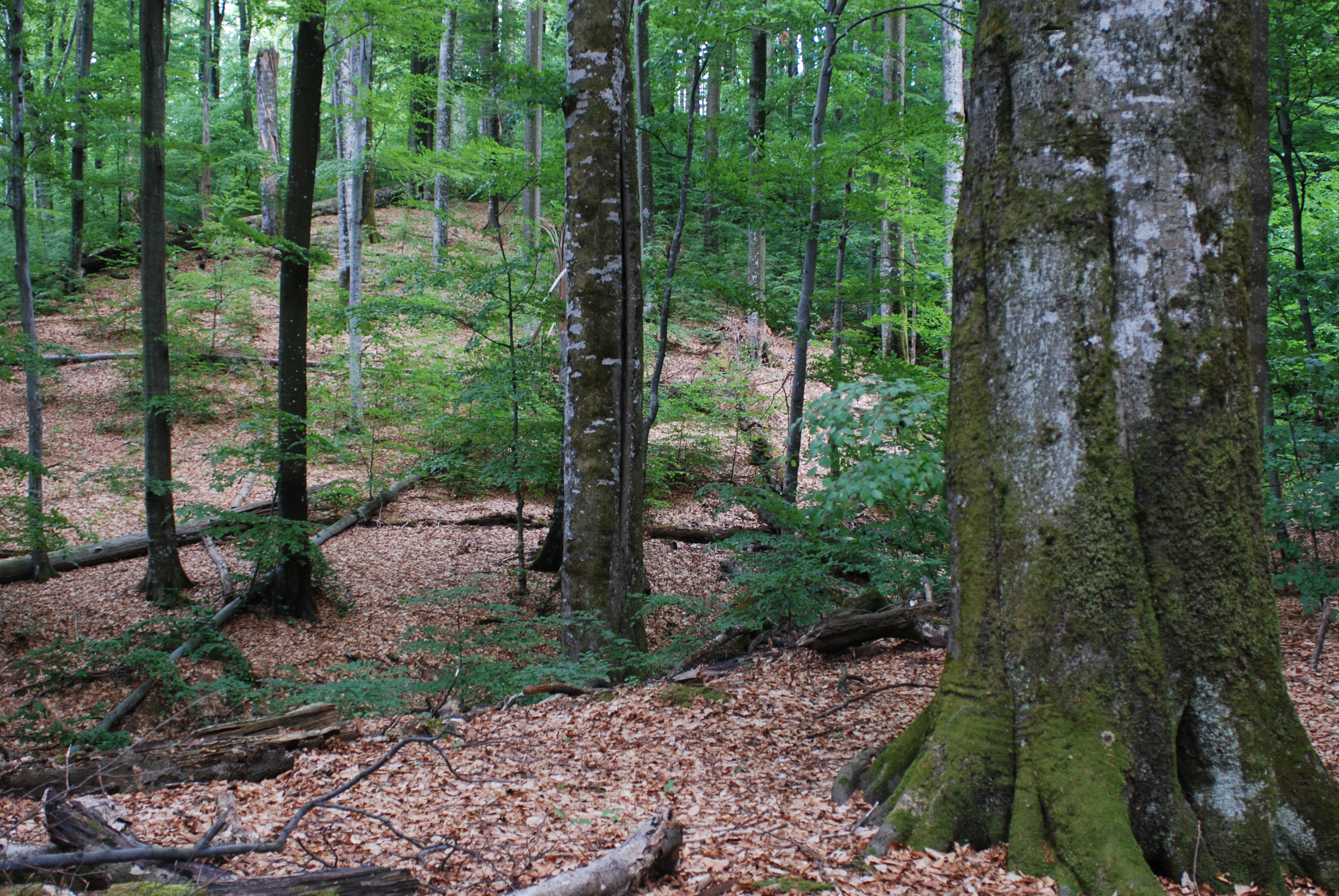
- Primeval beech forest in Mala Uholka

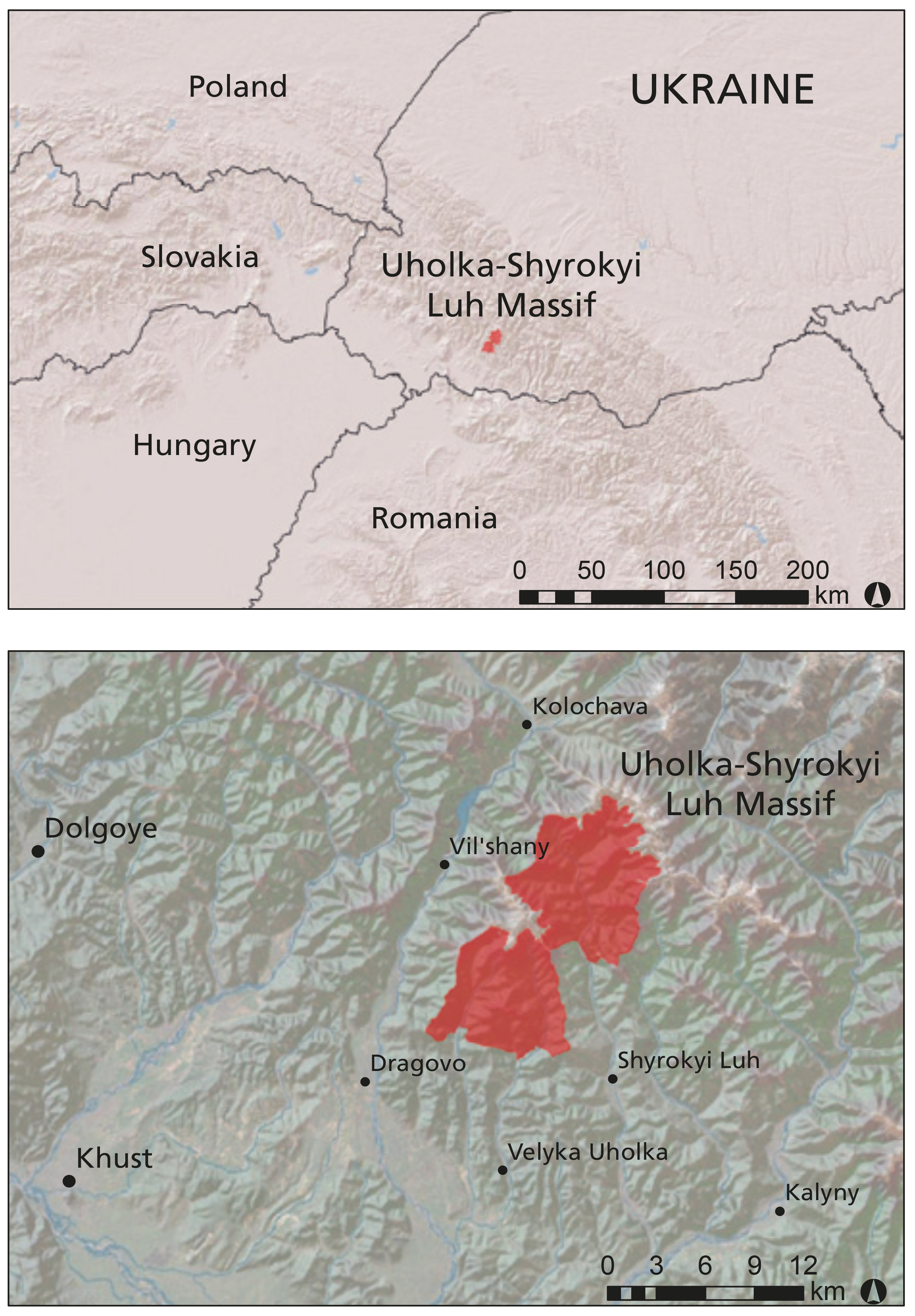
- Location: Ukraine; Zakarpattia Oblast, Tiachiv Raion
- Coordinates: 48°18′22″N 23°41′46″E
- Owner: Carpathian Biosphere Reserve
- World Heritage site: 2007

UNESCO World Heritage Site
- Official name: Uholka – Shyrokyi Luh
- Part of: Ancient and Primeval Beech Forests of the Carpathians and Other Regions of Europe
- Criteria: ix
- Reference: 1133
- Inscription: 2007 (31st Session)

Uholka-Shyrokyi Luh (Ukrainian: Угольсько-Широколужанський буковий праліс) is a protected forest area in Zakarpattia Oblast, Ukraine, which belongs to the Carpathian Biosphere Reserve. It is the largest primeval beech forest worldwide with an area of 8800 ha. Since 1920, some parts of this forest have been protected. In 1992, Uholka-Shyrokyi Luh primeval beech forest was designated as UNESCO World Heritage Site. Later, several other primeval and old-growth beech forests in Europe were included (in 2007 and 2011) in the UNESCO World Heritage Site Ancient and Primeval Beech Forests of the Carpathians and Other Regions of Europe as well.
As a primeval beech forest, Uholka-Shyrokyi Luh is an important research hotspot. In 2001, a 10 ha (200 x 500 m) research sample plot was installed in Mala Uholka as part of a Swiss-Ukrainian research project, and in 2010 a full statistical inventory of the primeval forest was carried out. The next inventory is planned in 2019 to detect any changes.

== Results of the 2010 forest inventory ==
The forest inventory took place on a forest area of 10,300 ha, 8800 ha of which are primeval forests. The rest is considered to be natural forest. During the fieldwork, 314 sample plots, each 500 m^{2} in area, were surveyed. Within each plot, all trees with a diameter at breast height (DBH) of 6 cm and more were measured. 97% of all the 6779 trees measured were European beech (Fagus sylvatica L.). The oldest beech trees were nearly 500 years. The largest tree was a wych elm (Ulmus glabra Huds.) with a DBH of 150 cm, whereas the largest beech tree had a DBH of 140 cm. 10 beech trees per hectare had a DBH of at least 80 cm. The number of living trees consisted of 435 trees per hectare with a basal area of 36.6 m^{2}/ha and volume of 582 m^{3}/ha. In addition, the volume of standing and lying deadwood was 163 m^{3}/ha. The vertical structure of this forest consisted of mainly three layers. Most gaps in the canopy cover were not larger than the crown of a canopy tree.

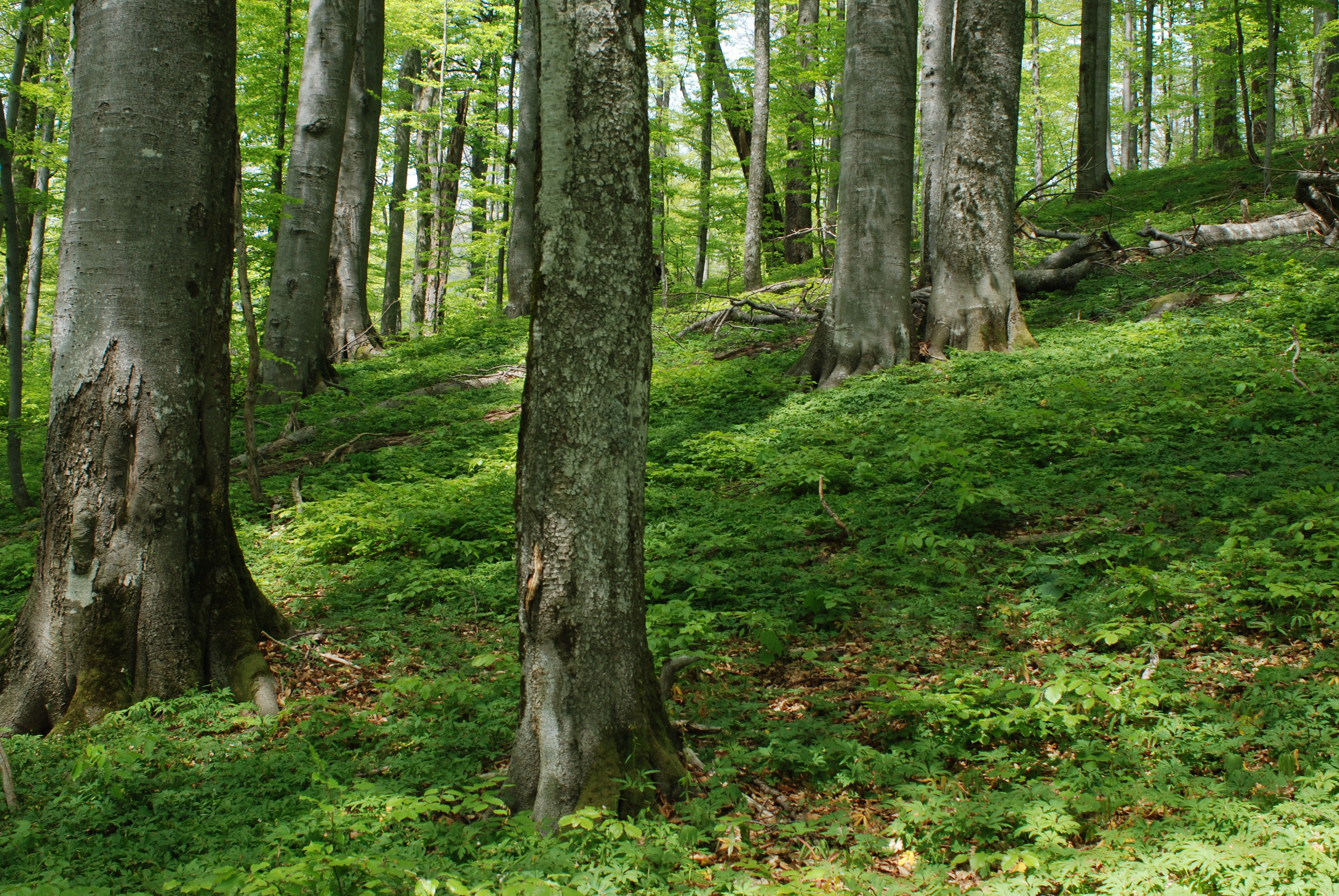
Primeval beech forest of Shyrokyi Luh

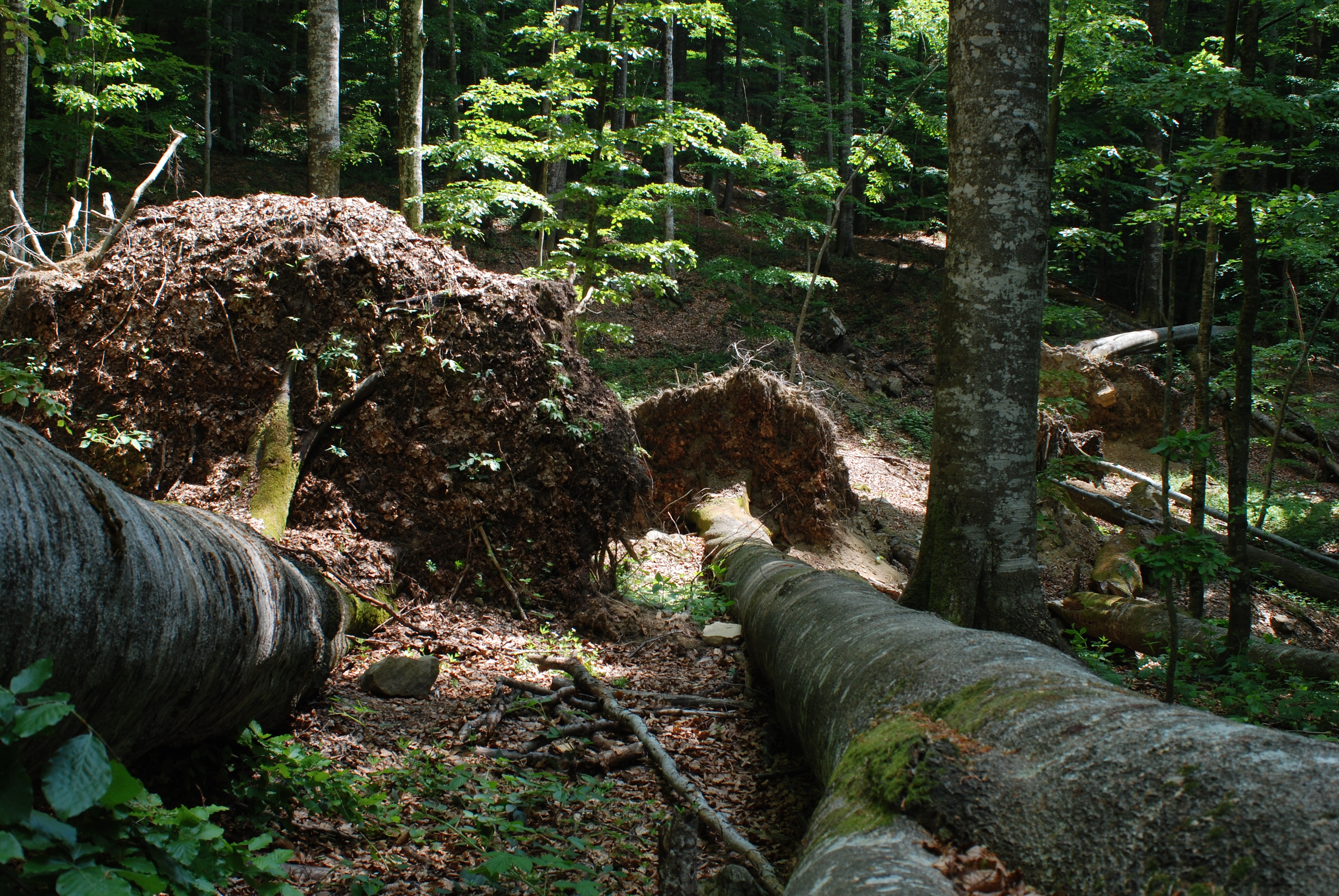
Windthrow in Shyrokyi Luh

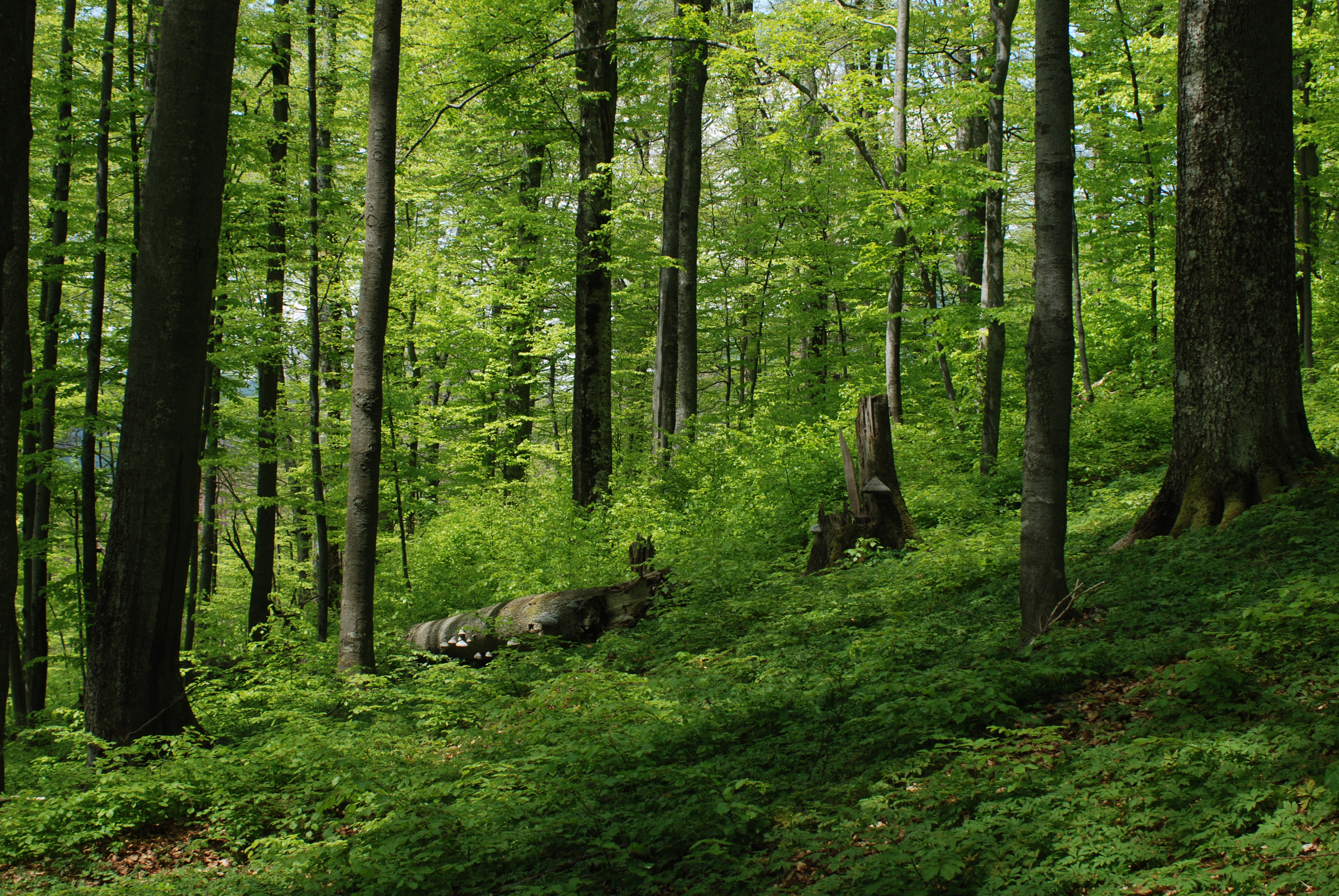
Forest regeneration in Shyrokyi Luh

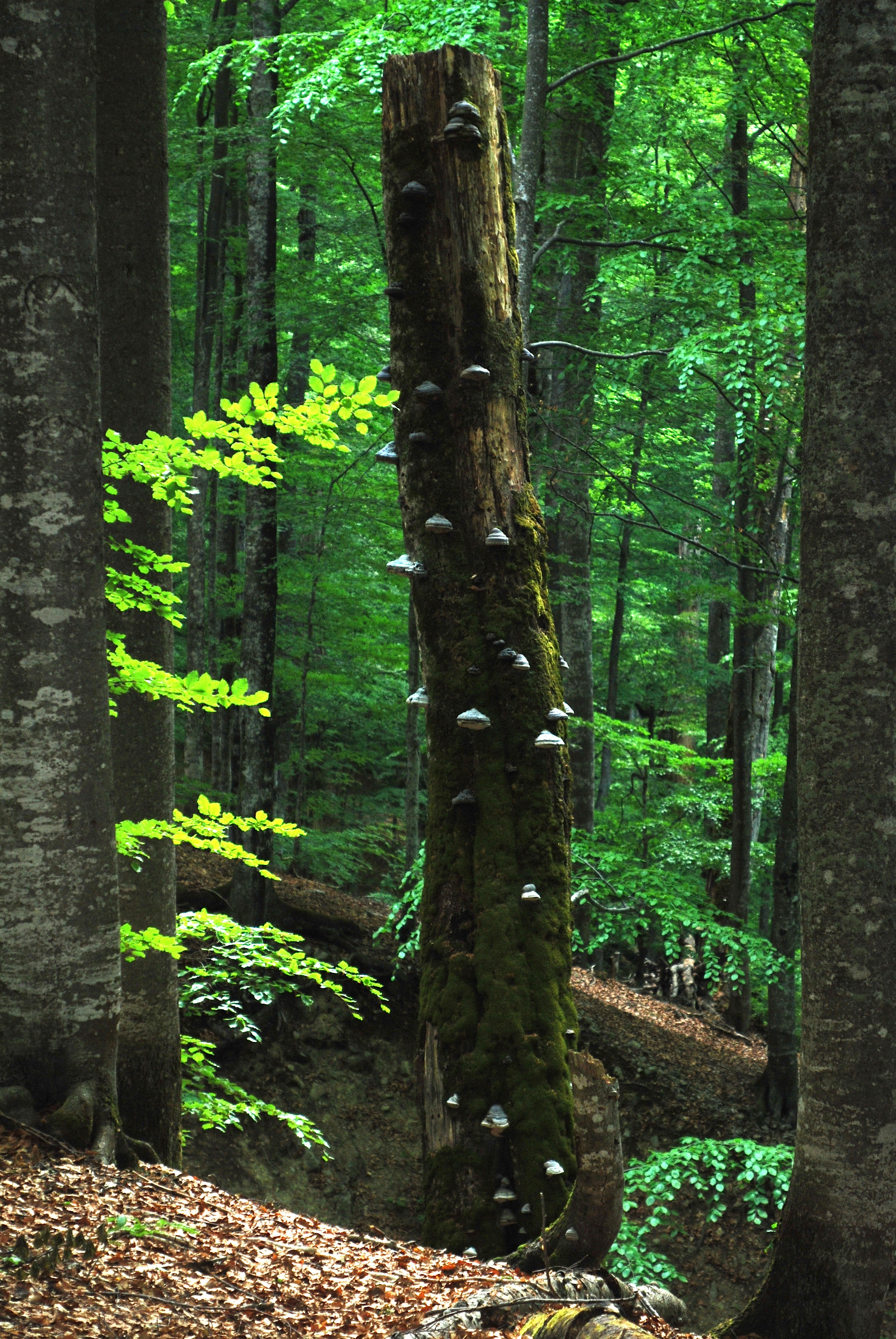
Standing deadwood in Shyrokyi Luh

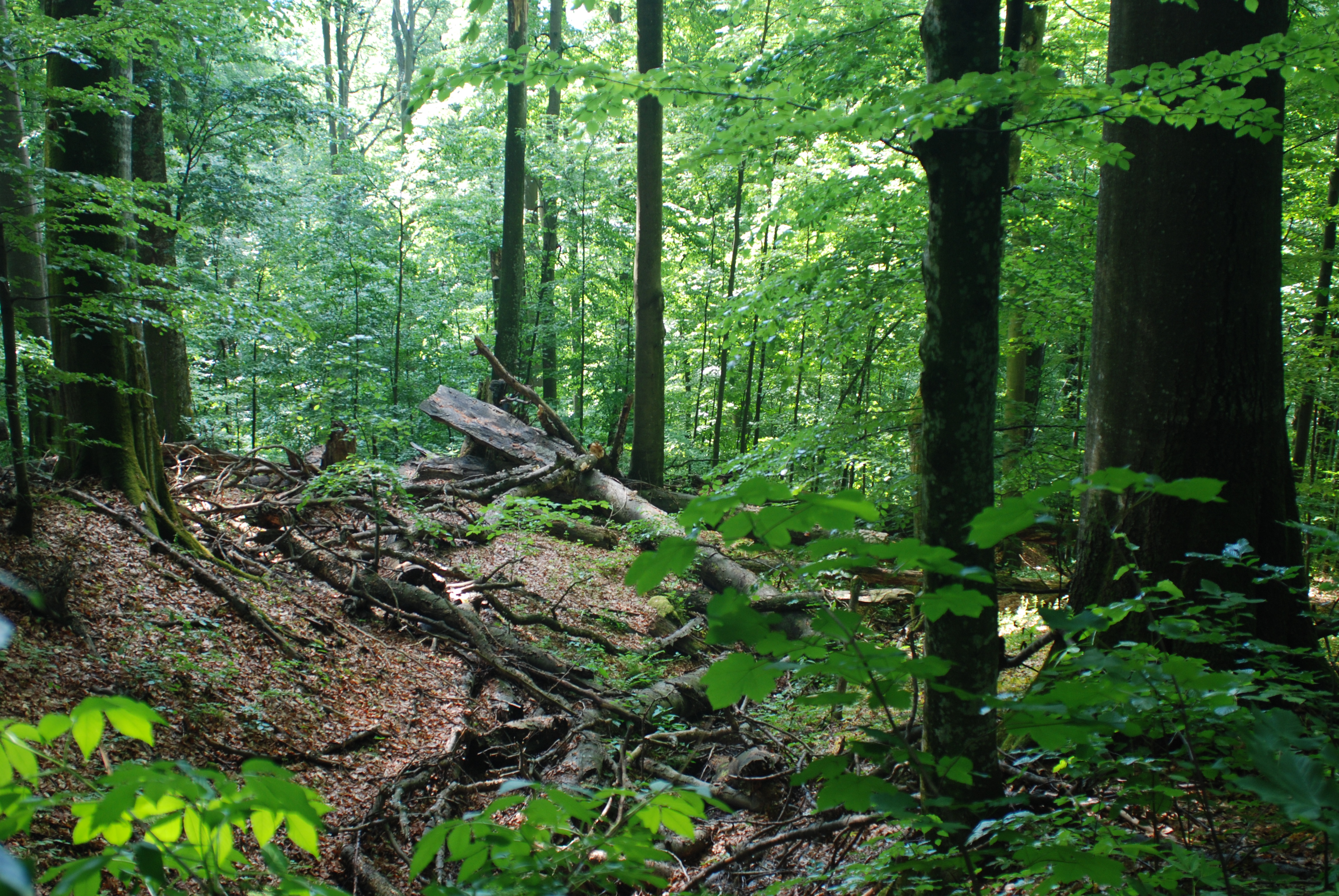
Research sample plot in Mala Uholka

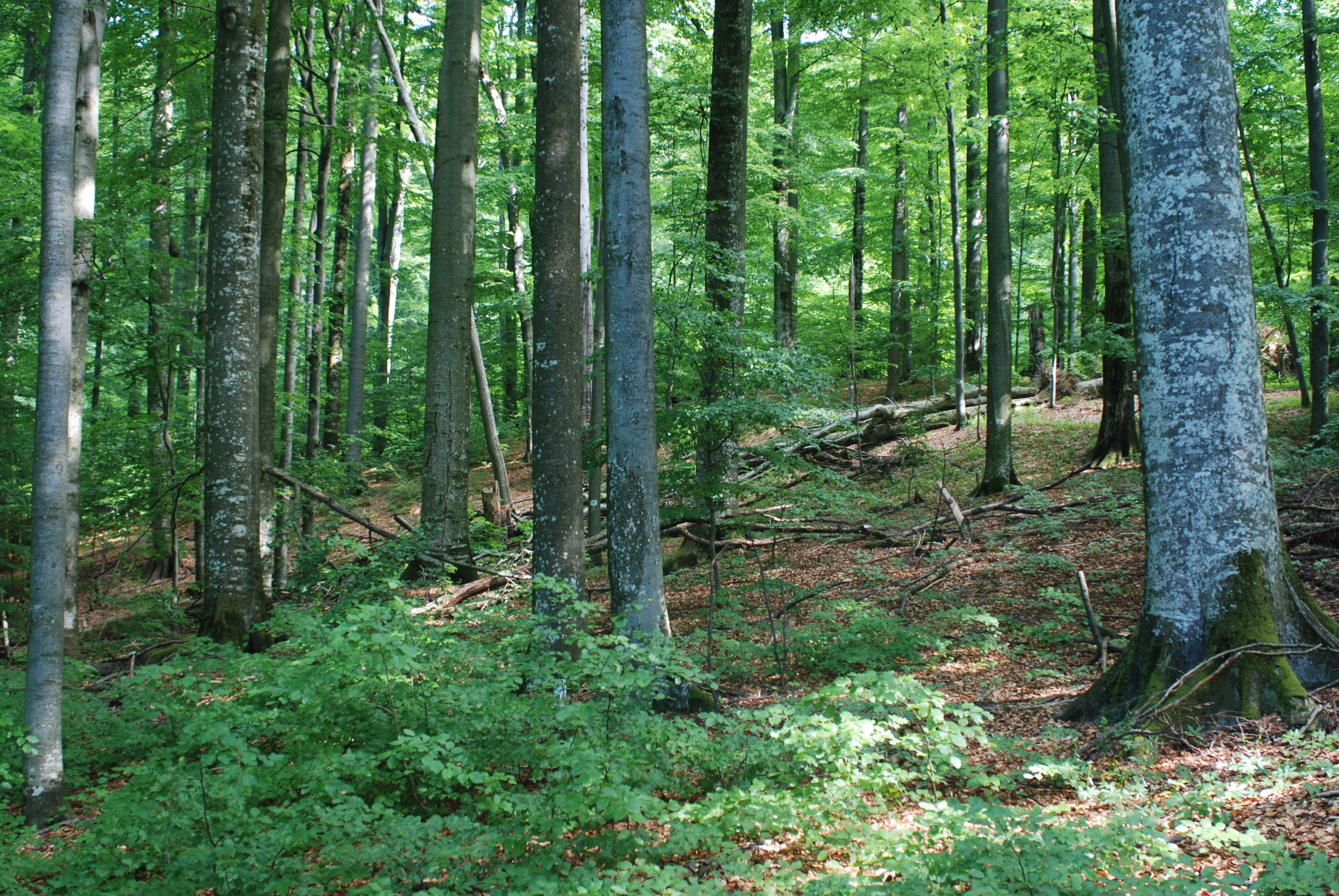
Research sample plot in Mala Uholka

== Ecotourism ==
Two ecological hiking trails have been created for visitors to the primeval beech forest of Uholka-Shyrokyi Luh:

1. Through the primeval beech forest of Mala Uholka (The Mala Uholka hiking trail): This trail guides visitors to Druzhba (lit. 'Friendship'), the longest karst cave in the Ukrainian Carpathians, and to Karstovyi Mist (lit. 'Karst Bridge'), a limestone formation in the form of an arch.
2. Through the primeval beech forest of Velyka Uholka (The Velyka Uholka hiking trail): This trail guides visitors to Molochnyi Kamin (lit. 'Milk Rock'), a karst cave where Paleolithic people belonging to the bear-hunting culture used to live.
