= Montejo de la Sierra =

- Municipality
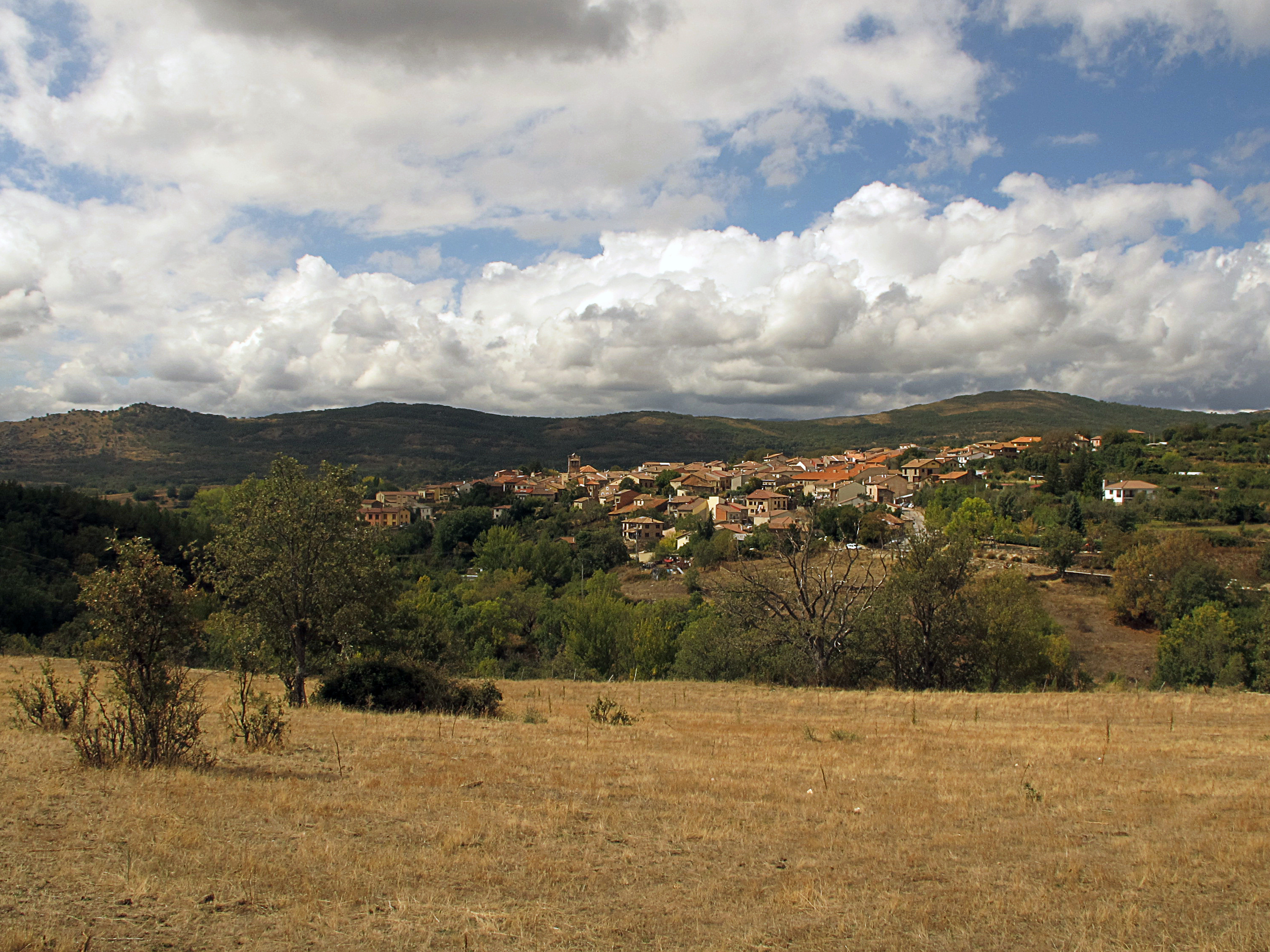
- General view of Montejo de la Sierra.

- Coat of arms

- Municipal location within the Community of Madrid.

- Location in Spain
- Coordinates: 41°04′N 3°32′W
- Country: Spain
- Autonomous community: Community of Madrid

Population (2025-01-01)
  - Total: 404
- Time zone: UTC+1 (CET)
  - Summer (DST): UTC+2 (CEST)

Montejo de la Sierra is a municipality of the Community of Madrid, Spain.
