= Stara Reka Reserve =

Nature reserve in Bulgaria

- IUCN category Ia (strict nature reserve)
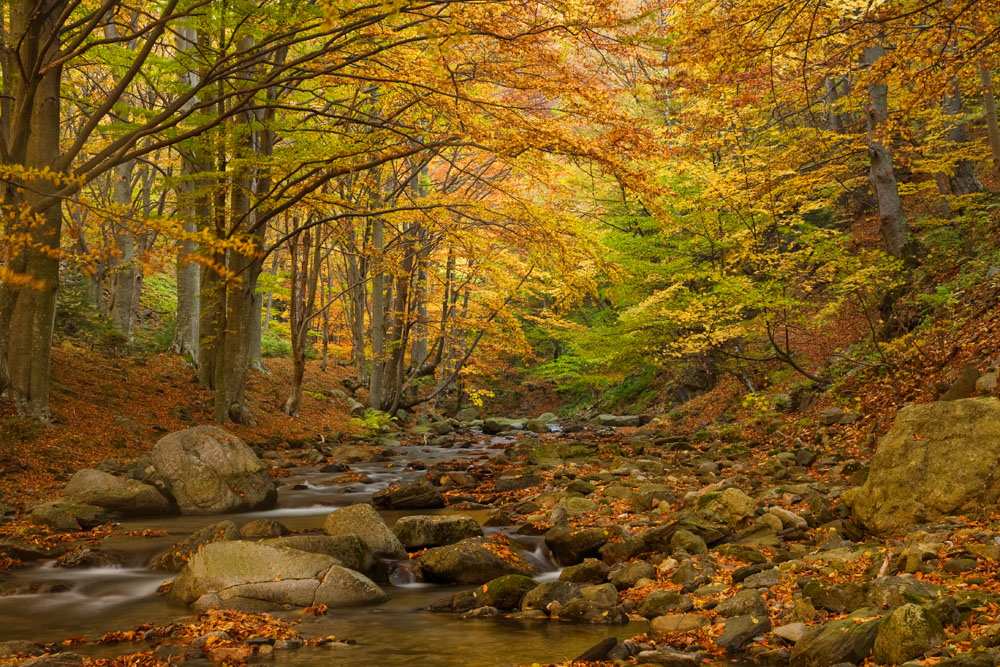

- Location within Bulgaria
- Location: Municipality of Karlovo, Plovdiv Province, Bulgaria
- Nearest city: Karlovo
- Coordinates: 42°38′36.65″N 24°48′25.75″E
- Area: 19.747 km^{2} (7.624 sq mi)
- Established: 1981
- Governing body: Ministry of Environment and Water

Stara Reka (Bulgarian: Стара река, meaning Old river) is one of the nine nature reserves in the Central Balkan National Park in central Bulgaria. Stara Reka was established on 19 March 1981 to protect the unique ecosystems of the Balkan Mountains. It spans an area of 1974.7 hectares, or 19.747km^{2}.

== Geography ==
The reserve is situated a few kilometres to the north of the town of Karlovo in the northern section of Plovdiv Province. It covers the southern slopes of the Balkan Mountains sprawling from Levski Peak (2166 m) and Golyam Kupen Peak (2169 m) on the main ridge of the mountain range south along the valley of Stara Reka river and its tributaries.

The altitude of the reserve varies between 1000 and 2169 m. The southern slopes of the Balkan Mountains have a milder climate with a snow cover lasting for an average of 120 days annually. The soil types are diverse ranging from mountain meadow soils in the highest areas to brown forest and cinnamon soils at lower altitudes.

== Flora ==
The forest habitats in Stara Reka Reserve usually include four to five tree species. The lowest parts of the reserve are covered by sessile oak (Quercus petraea), European beech (Fagus sylvatica), South European flowering ash (Fraxinus ornus), European hop-hornbeam (Ostrya carpinifolia) and Oriental hornbeam (Carpinus orientalis). Mixed beech and fir forests along with field maple (Acer campestre), Heldreich's maple (Acer heldreichii) and silver birch (Betula pendula) grow at higher altitudes. Forests of Norway spruce (Picea abies) grow at the highest altitudes.

The reserve is rich in rare species. 45 species are listed in the Red Book of Bulgaria, of them 20 are endemic to the country, such as Primula frondosa, Centaurea kerneriana, Campanula trojanensis, Stachys alpina, etc.

== Fauna ==
Stara Reka Reserve contains the westernmost population of chamois along the southern slopes of the Balkan Mountains. It is also an important sanctuary for the brown bear, gray wolf, wildcat, European pine marten and Eurasian otter.

The avifauna is represented by many species of birds of prey such as Eastern imperial eagle, golden eagle, booted eagle, long-legged buzzard, European honey buzzard, northern goshawk, Eurasian sparrowhawk, saker falcon, Peregrine falcon and Eurasian eagle-owl. Other birds of conservation importance are hazel grouse, white-backed woodpecker, black woodpecker, etc.

== Gallery ==
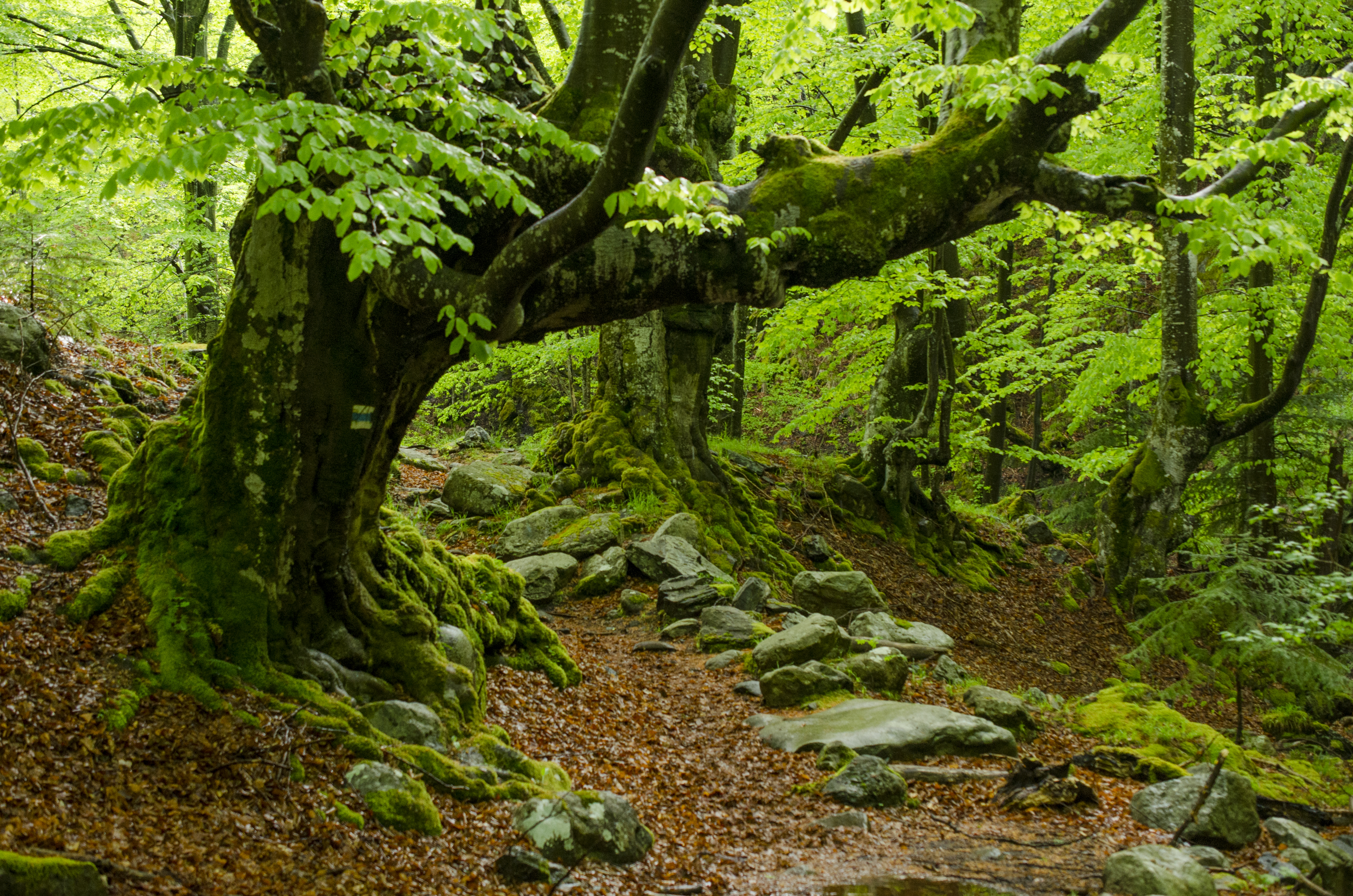

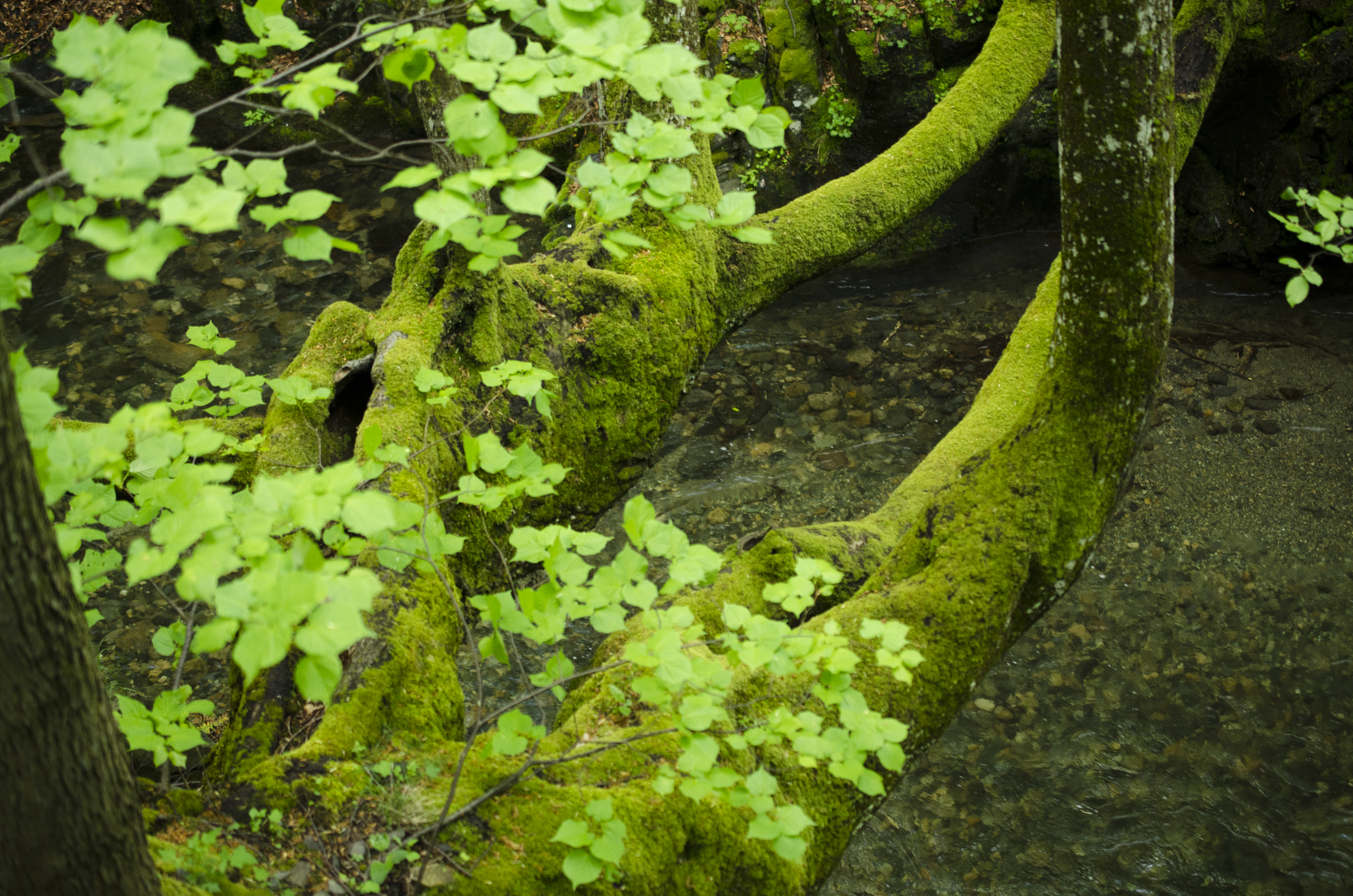

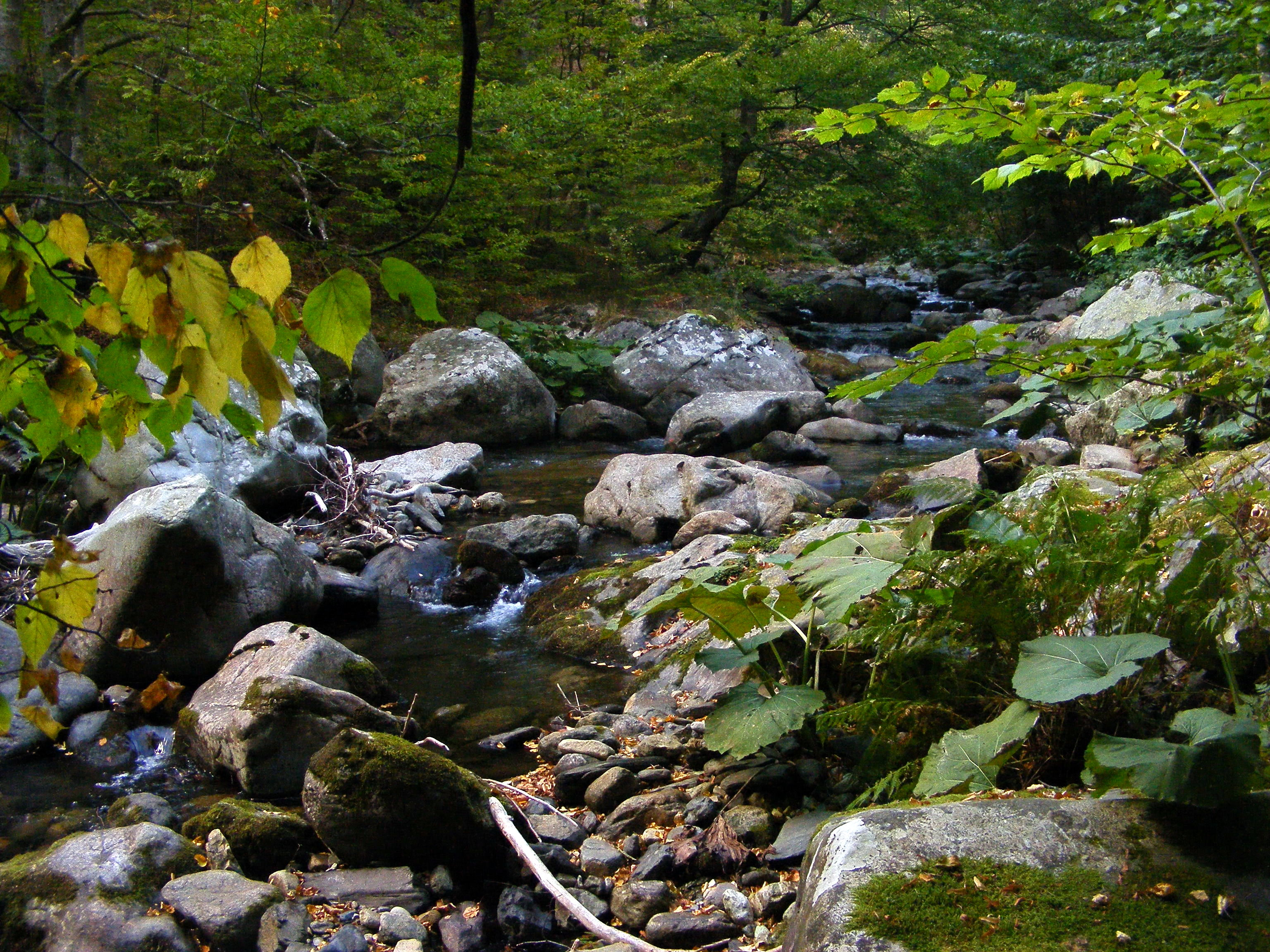

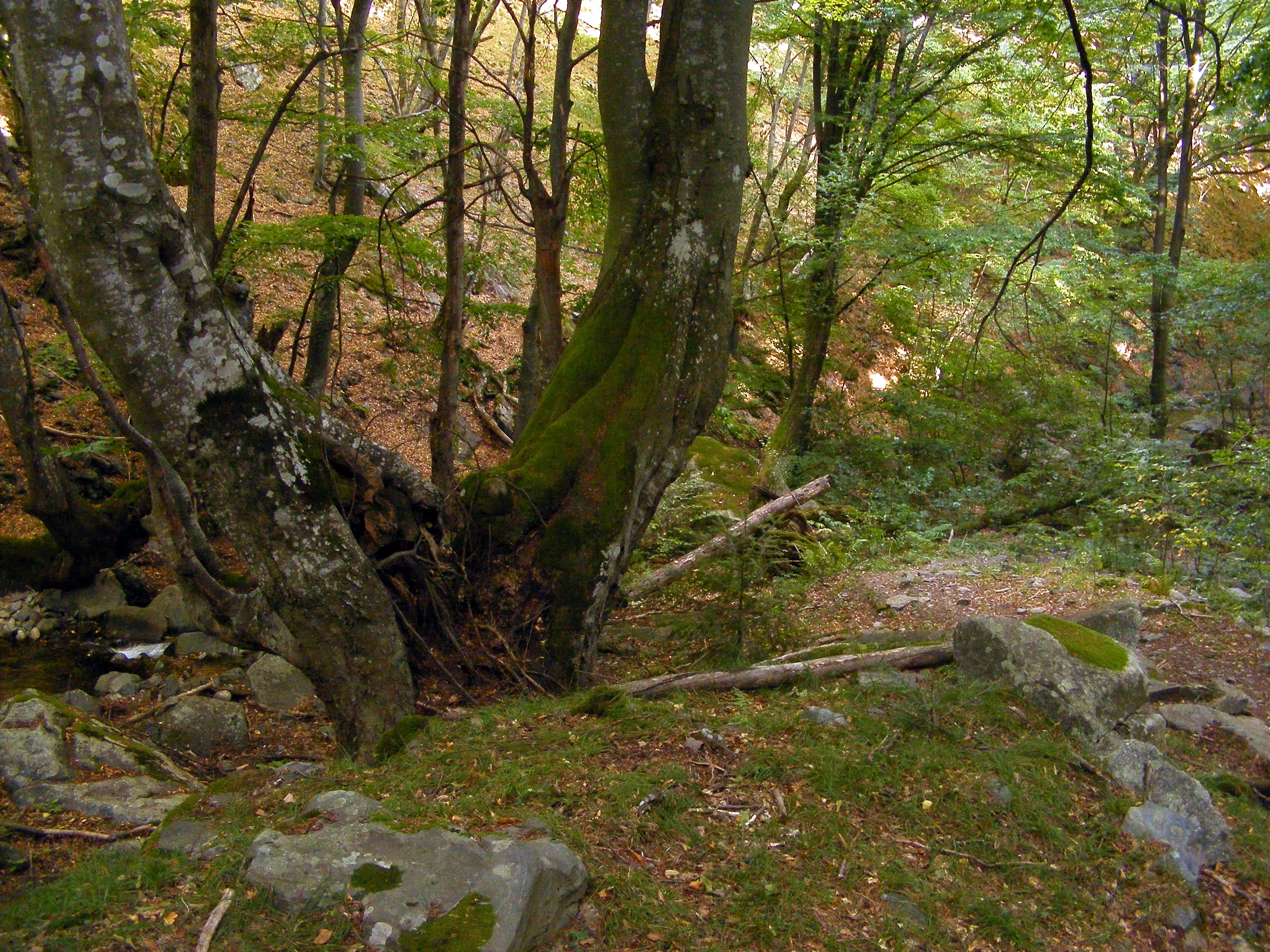

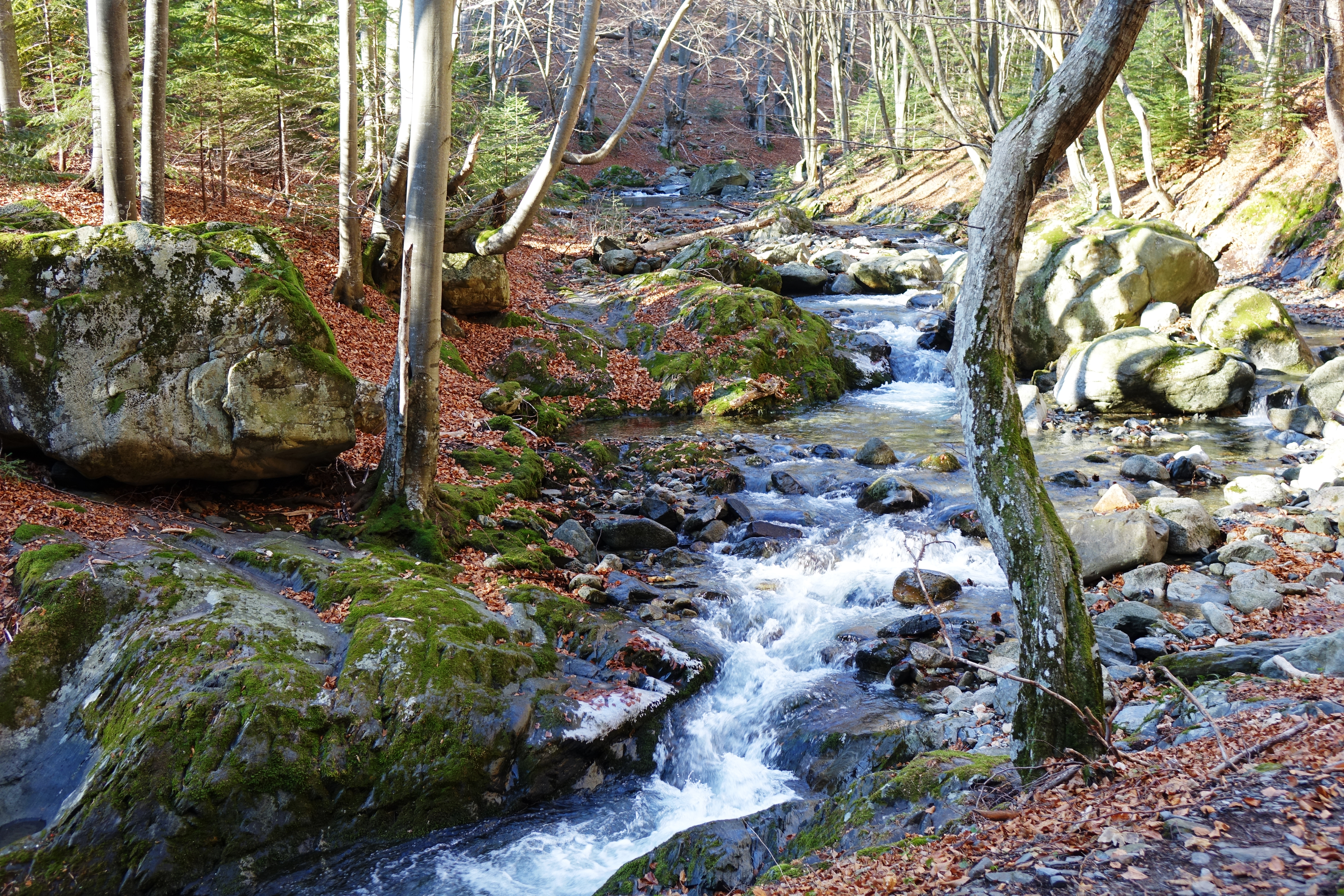
