= Gorgany Nature Reserve =

Nature reserve in Ukraine

- Ukrainian: Заповідник «Ґорґани»
- IUCN category Ia (strict nature reserve)
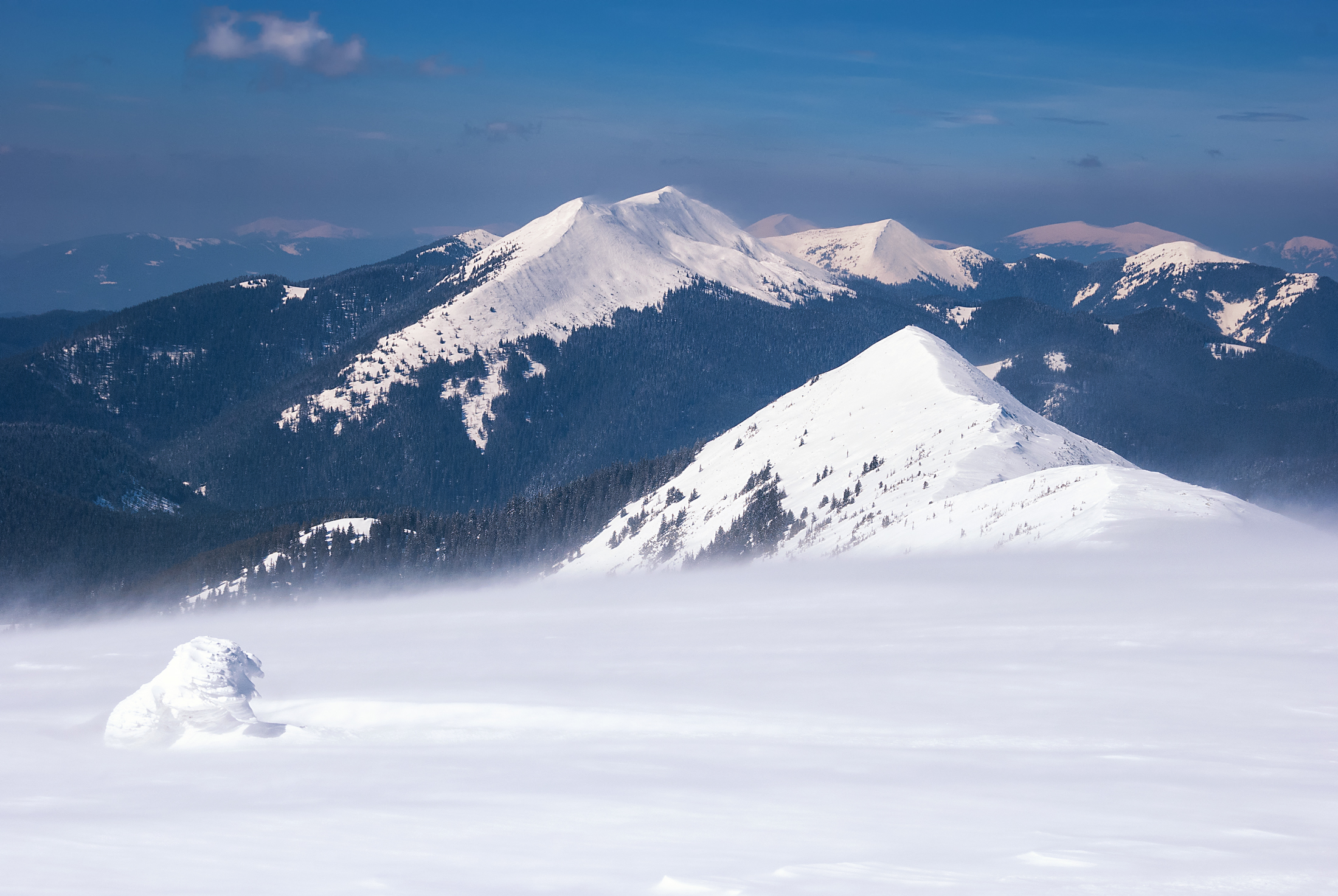
- Mountains in Winter, Gorgany Nature Reserve

- Location within Ukraine
- Location: Nadvirna Raion, Ivano-Frankivsk Oblast
- Coordinates: 48°27′09″N 24°14′00″E
- Area: 5,344 hectares (13,205 acres; 53 km^{2}; 21 sq mi)
- Established: 1996
- Governing body: Ministry of Ecology and Natural Resources (Ukraine)
- Website: http://gorgany.if.ua/uk.html

The Gorgany Nature Reserve (Ukrainian: Заповідник «Ґорґани») is a strict nature reserve (a zapovidnyk) of Ukraine that covers a part of the Gorgany mountain range of the Outer Eastern Carpatians in southwest Ukraine. The reserve is 46% old-growth forest, one of the last and largest such stands in Europe. The reserve was originally created in 1996 to protect relic stands of Stone pine trees (Pinus cembra). The reserve is administratively in the Nadvirna Raion of Ivano-Frankivsk Oblast.

== Topography ==
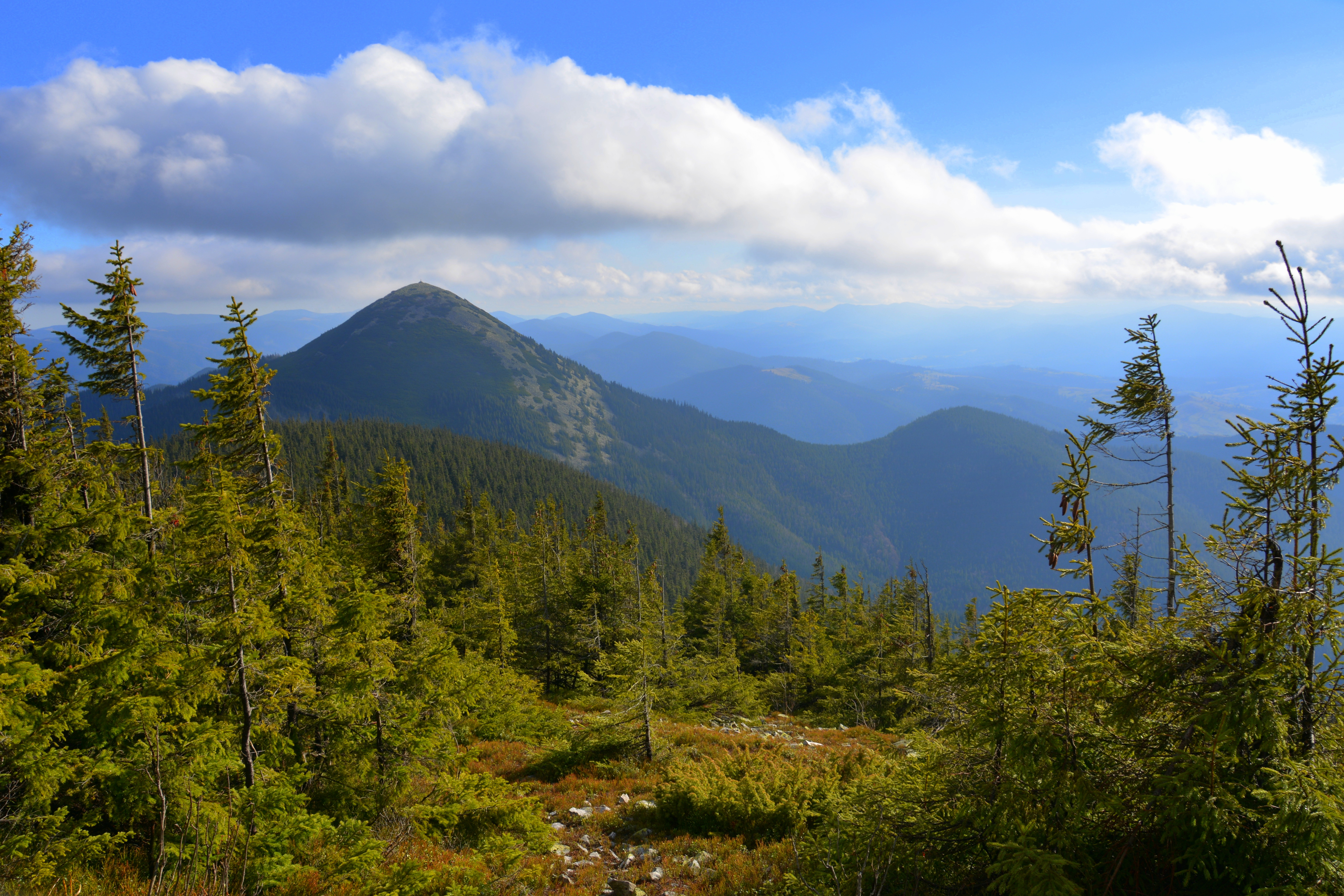
Forest landscape in Gorgany

The Gorgany range is mostly strongly-layered sedimentary rock (a type called flysch), that fractures into debris fields known locally as 'gorgan'. The full vertical range of the central Carpatians are represented, with altitudes in the park ranging from 710 to 1754 meters above sea level. The range runs from northwest to southeast, on Cretaceous and Quaternary conglomerates, sandstones, clay and marls. There are 30 mountain streams in the park, forming a dense network that feed into the Bystrytsia River. The steep landscape, formed in the Wurzburg glaciation, is covered with coniferous forests.

== Climate and ecoregion ==
The climate of Gorgany is Humid continental climate, warm summer (Köppen climate classification (Dfb)). This climate is characterized by large seasonal temperature differentials and a warm summer (at least four months averaging over 10 °C (50 °F), but no month averaging over 22 °C (72 °F). Average temperature in January is −7.6 °C (18.3 °F) and in July is 16.4 °C (61.5 °F). Average annual precipitation is 853–1,007 millimetres (33.6–39.6 in). Average annual humidity is 78%.

== Flora and fauna ==
76% of the territory is stable, natural forest that has grown on its own and demonstrates the sustainability of the site through the complete forest cycle. 46% of the total area is virgin (old-growth) forest, totalling over 2,110 hectares (8.1 sq mi).

The dominant trees in the old-growth stands are spruce and pine. The relic pines (European, ordinary, and mountain pine), decay to produce the soil that supports the more productive successor fir and beech forests. The lower elevations are mixed deciduous and coniferous. The most numerous non-tree plants are the herbaceous perennials, with relatively fewer shrubs (cranberries, heather, blueberries, etc.) The main altitude zones are:

- Stream valley - mixed forest.
- Moderate and cool zone (770-1200 meters asl) - spruce forest
- Moderately cold thermal zone (1200-1600 meters asl) - pure fir and cedar-spruce forest
- Sub-alpine zone (about 1600 meters asl) - pine shrubs, and rocks covered with moss and lichen

Further down on the lower stream terraces are speckled alders (Alnus incana), with grass cover featuring white butterbur (Petasites albus), meadowsweet (Filipendula ulmaria), marsh horsetail (Equisetum palustre), marsh-marigold (Caltha palustris), and narrow-leaved bittercress (Cardamine impatiens).

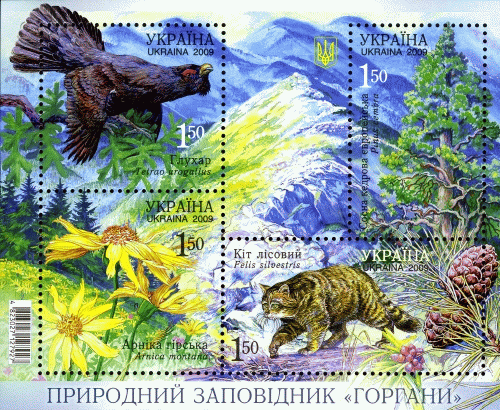
Stamp of Ukraine (2009) commemorating Gorgany Nature Reserve

Scientists have mapped the reserve into 17 different characteristic forest types, the diversity due to altitude zoning, soil differences, micro-climate differences, and other factors that make the Gorgany Reserve a valuable reference for natural Carpathian ecosystems.

== Public use ==
As a strict nature reserve, Gorgany's primary purpose is protection of nature and scientific study. Public access is limited: mass recreation and construction of facilities is prohibited as are hunting and fishing.

== See also ==
- Lists of Nature Preserves of Ukraine (class Ia protected areas)
- National Parks of Ukraine (class II protected areas)
