= Vratsa waterfalls =

Pair of waterfalls in Vratsa, Bulgaria

Two of the highest waterfalls in Bulgaria are located near the town of Vratsa, North-West Bulgaria. One is named Skaklya and the other one Borov Kamak.

Skaklya (Bulgarian: Скакля) is the name of two different waterfalls in Bulgaria. The one near Vratsa is 141 metres and is located 1.5 kilometres south of the town behind the Kaleto hill top 43°10′57″N 23°32′59″E. It is considered one of the highest waterfalls in Bulgaria and on the Balkan Peninsula. Nevertheless, this remains a debatable question in Bulgaria until today, as this is a semi-active waterfall, not a constant one (not having constant flow of water) unlike the 124.5 metres high Raysko Praskalo (Heavenly Spray) also situated in Bulgaria. Water falls from the vertical Skaklia cliff when there is heavy raining or after the massive melting of snow at the end of winter or early spring, otherwise little water can be seen from farther distances. When active, however, the waterfall is easy to recognize from tourists standing many kilometres away from it, especially if they approach it from the north-west parts of Bulgaria. In the waterfall area a lot of remains from the ancient Bulgarian village Patleina have been found. Beautiful throughout the entire year it overlooks the town of Vratsa and the Vratsa lowlands. The waterfall is a summit spot of different goat routes. The Skaklya cliff itself is situated in a difficult to reach area and regardless of its clear visibility from the city, remains a difficult spot to reach by the majority of the tourists visiting Vratsa.

Borov Kamak (Bulgarian: Боров Камък) or literally translated in English “Pine stone” is another beautiful waterfall that graces the mountainous outskirts of Vratsa 43°9′7″N 23°30′16″E. The waterfall is in Vratsa mountain, which is part of the famous Balkan mountain range. Borov Kamak is 63 metres high and is an affluent to the river Leva, running through the central parts of Vratsa. It is also part of the Vratsa Balkan Park, being one of the main tourist attractions and a much easier place to reach than Skaklia. The waterfall has been famous among tourists in the past couple of years due to the activities of the Vratsa Balkan Park officials and different tourist associations. Co-operating on making the waterfall more popular and easy to reach they create a tourist route that easily leads to its location. When people take the road leading up to the peaks of Vratsa mountain and after reaching a relatively high point of their travel, a turning to the left depicts one of the most beautiful sceneries of the Borov Kamak waterfall.

== See also ==
- List of waterfalls
