= Hristo Iliev Iliev =

Bulgarian football chairman

- Христо Илиев Илиев
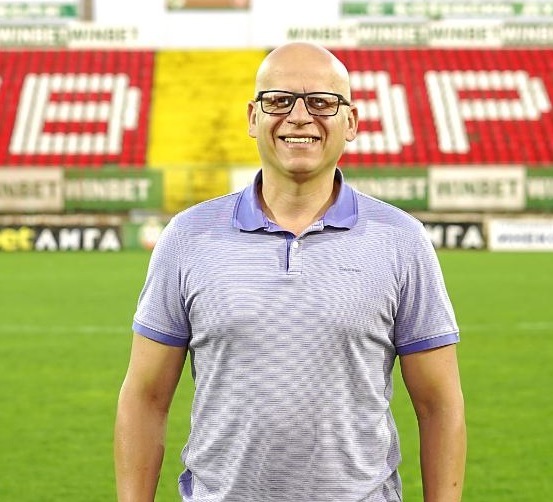

POFC Botev Vratsa chairman

Personal details
- Born: 29 December 1982 (age 43) Vratsa, Bulgaria
- Profession: Football chairman Promoter

Hristo Iliev Iliev (Bulgarian: Христо Илиев Илиев; born 29 December 1982) is a Bulgarian public figure and chairman of Bulgarian football club Botev Vratsa.

In January 2021, Iliev was central to repaying more than 500 000 leva of the club's debts. During the time of his chairmanship, the club achieved numerous good results, including wins over Ludogorets Razgrad and Levski Sofia. On 4 September 2021, for the 100th anniversary of FC Botev Vratsa, Iliev initiated the creation of a memorial in front of Hristo Botev Stadium. It commemorates the founding fathers of the club. He presented Boyan Botev, the great grandson of Hristo Botev, an honorary badge. Former and current players were also honored. In October 2021, under his initiative, the players of the club received COVID-19 vaccines, and he opened a vaccination center in front of the stadium. In December 2021, he offered the transfer of Dorian Babunski for 100 000 euros.

In 2018, Iliev donated a new bell to the old Boyar Church of St. Nicholas in Vratsa.
