= Aleksandar Alekov =

Bulgarian public figure (born 1985)

European Parliament candidate of People's Voice (Political Party)

Personal details
- Born: 25 April 1985 (age 41) Vratsa, Bulgaria
- Party: Unattached
- Education: City University London; Hanze University of Applied Sciences, Groningen
- Profession: Political scientist Football agent

Aleksandar Trifonov Alekov (Bulgarian: Александър Трифонов Алеков) (born 25 April 1985) is a Bulgarian public figure, a candidate for European Parliament at the 2014 elections, representing People's Voice. He was nominated second on the electoral list of People's Voice after participating in the first public casting held by a political party in Bulgaria. Alekov is a political scientist, holding degrees from Hanze University of Applied Sciences, Groningen and City University London. He specialises in studying manifestations of nationalism and populism in the European Union. During a European elections debate broadcast on the Bulgarian National Television on 9 May 2014, in an outburst he openly expressed his disgust with Bulgarian political figures, accusing them of always fudging important issues.

Alekov is Ulcerative colitis sufferer and criticizes GMO foods with promoting healthy eating habits being center of his social and political campaigning.

In 2017 Alekov created the Bulgarian web portal http://AlportAl.net which deals with numerous topics, including promotion of youth sports, health advice and gastronomy.

== Botev Vratsa Football Club ==
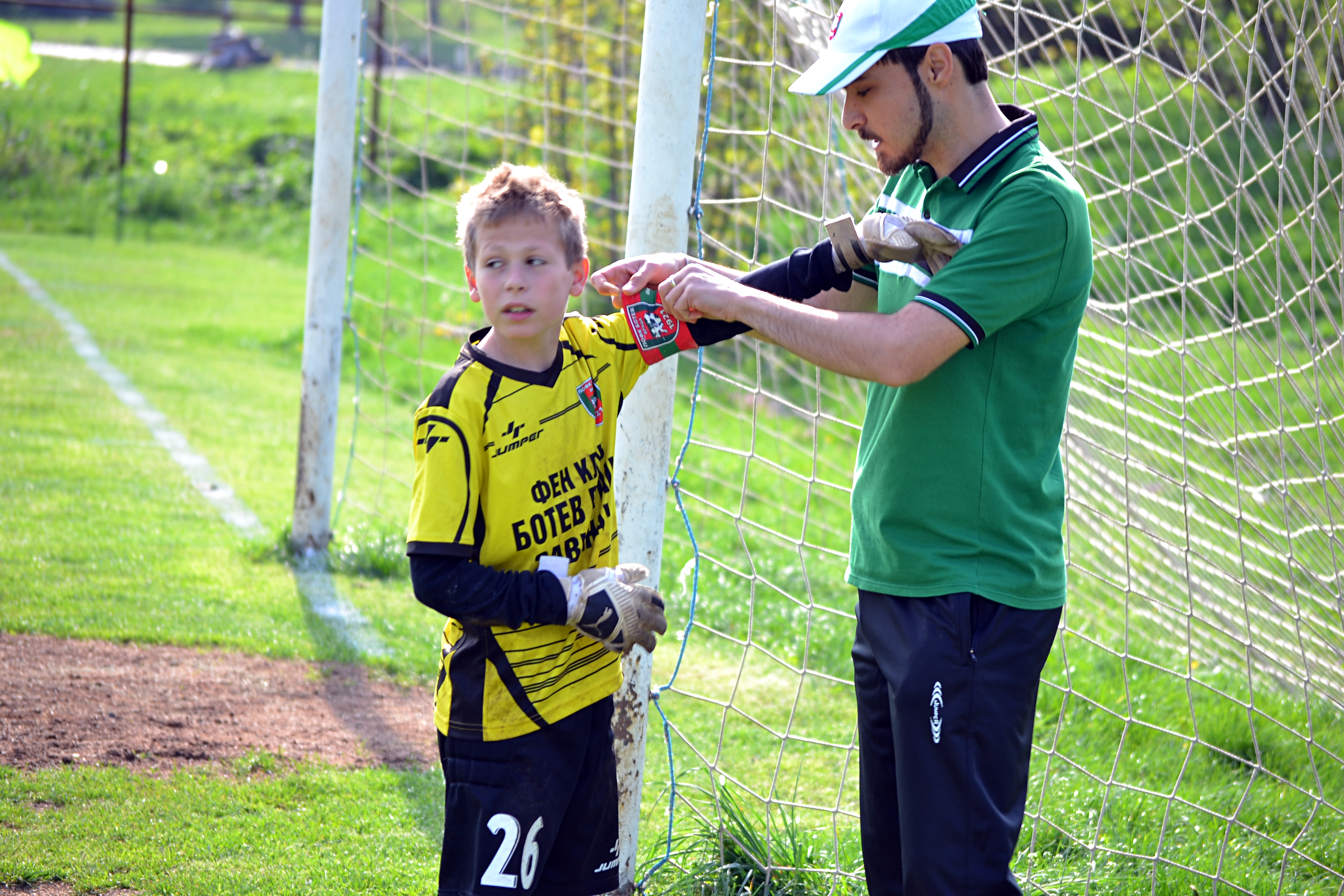
Aleksandar Alekov mentoring young goalkeeper Kristiyan Todorov at the Botev Vratsa academy

Alekov is a supporter of Bulgarian football club Botev Vratsa. In 2009 he initiated a change of the club logo and personally created the new one, adopted by the club the same year.

In 2015 Alekov began working for the football academy of Botev Vratsa as a volunteer and dedicated his time to mentoring the children at the academy, involving them in numerous social initiatives around the city. He introduced English language lessons to the academy, which is considered a first in Bulgarian football and as representative of the Botev Vratsa fan club launched a campaign for raising funds for new sports equipment for all 120 children enrolled in the academy. In June 2016, he revived the children football tournament "The Days of Botev", which was part of the national celebrations in Bulgaria commemorating 140 years since the death of Hristo Botev. The tournament was organised solely by Alekov with support from the municipality and included teams such as Beroe Stara Zagora, Levski Sofia and CSKA Sofia. Botev Vratsa participated with the team of children born in 2004 and finished in fourth place having defeated Levski 4:3 in the group stage and drawing 1:1 with Beroe. Champions were DIT Academy defeating FC National Sofia in the final by 4:0. The tournament was declared a major success by fans and participants alike.

== ALPORTAL & Football agency ==
In 2021, ALPORTAL has been restructured into a football agency with Alekov becoming a FIFA Licensed intermediary as of 1 February. One of his first clients included some of the most promising academy prospects of Botev Vratsa, whom he has been mentoring for years. ALPORTAL is the official representative of Miroslav Marinov, who is the youngest player to ever take part in a competitive match for FC Botev Vratsa.
