= Penkov =

Penkov (Bulgarian: Пенков) is a Bulgarian masculine surname, its feminine counterpart is Penkova. It may refer to

- Galina Penkova (born 1958), Bulgarian sprinter
- Herman Penkov (born 1994), Ukrainian football goalkeeper
- Maria Penkova (born 1984), Bulgarian tennis player
- Miroslav Penkov (born 1982), Bulgarian writer
- Nikolay Penkov (born 1947), Bulgarian football defender
- Sofia Penkova (born 1979), Bulgarian figure skater
