= Nikolay Penkov =

Bulgarian footballer

Personal information
- Date of birth: 17 December 1947 (age 78)
- Place of birth: Vratsa, Bulgaria
- Position: Defender

Senior career*
Years	Team	Apps	(Gls)
1969–1981	Botev Vratsa	334	(14)

International career
1971	Bulgaria	2	(0)
- * Club domestic league appearances and goals

Nikolay Penkov (Bulgarian: Николай Пенков; born 17 December 1947) is a former Bulgarian international footballer who played as a defender.

Between 1969 and 1981 Penkov played in 334 matches for Botev Vratsa, scoring 14 goals. In 1971 with the club he played in the two matches against Dinamo Zagreb of UEFA Cup.

For Bulgaria national football team, Penkov was capped 2 times.
