= Borov Kamak =

Waterfall

Coordinates: 43°9′11″N 23°30′18″E

- Боров камък
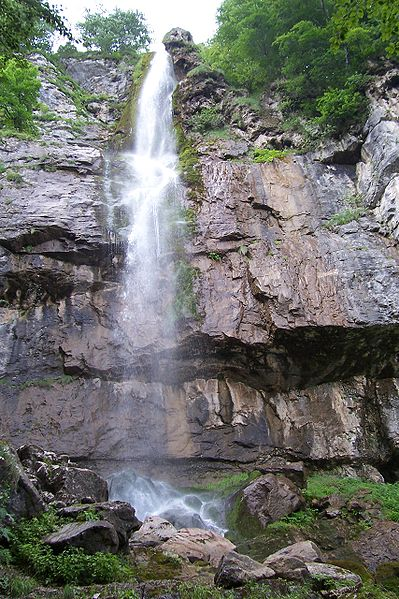
- Borov Kamak Waterfall
- Interactive map of Borov Kamak
- Location: Balkan Mountains, Bulgaria
- Type: Plunge
- Total height: 63 m (207 ft)

Borov Kamak (Bulgarian: Боров камък, "Pine Stone") is a waterfall in the Vratsa mountain, western Balkan Mountains, Bulgaria. The waterfall is situated on one the tributaries of the river Leva which flows through Vratsa. It is located on the territory of Vrachanski Balkan Nature Park. The waterfall is 63 m (207 ft) high.

== See also ==
- List of waterfalls
