= POFC Botev Vratsa =

Bulgarian football club

Botev Vratsa
- Full name: Професионален Общински Футболен Клуб Ботев Враца; Professional Municipal Football Club; Botev Vratsa
- Nicknames: Зелените Лъвове (The Green Lions)
- Founded: 1921; 105 years ago
- Ground: Stadion Hristo Botev
- Capacity: 25,000 (8,935 seated)
- Owner: Vratsa Municipality
- Chairman: Hristo Iliev
- Head coach: Todor Simov
- League: First League
- 2025–26: First League, 9th of 16
- Website: botev-vratsa.com
Home colours	Away colours	Third colours

Botev (Bulgarian: Ботев) is a Bulgarian professional football club based in Vratsa, that competes in the First League, the top division of Bulgarian football.

The club was founded in 1921. Since 1948, Botev have played their home games at Stadion Hristo Botev. It is situated in the Hristo Botev sport complex, in the east part of Vratsa. The stadium originally had 25,000 seats. After a recent reconstruction, which took place in 2008, 2009, 2015 and in 2022, the stadium has 9 reconstructed seated sectors with a total of 8 935 seats.

Botev's longest continuous period in the top tier was 26 consecutive seasons between 1964 and 1990. The club's highest ever league finish came in 1970–71 when it finished third in the top flight.

== History ==
Botev Vratsa Football Club was founded in 1921 by Nikola Kunov, Ivan Abuzov, Nako Paunov, Gergo Boytchev, Todor Orozov, Hristo Lighenski and Angel Rachinski. The place of foundation is a playground near the Old market in Vratsa. Between 1921 and 1956 various sport clubs were founded in the city. In 1957 most of the sport clubs in the city are joined to form FC Botev Vratsa. Between 1957 and 1964 Botev Vratsa is a member of Bulgarian second division. In 1964 the club entered the Bulgarian top division and played there for 26 seasons. The team of Vratsa has 788 games in the top flight of Bulgarian football.

Botev's most glorious moment came in 1971, when the team finished third in Bulgarian top division, after CSKA Sofia and Levski Sofia. Botev did, however, represent Bulgaria in the 1971–72 UEFA Cup where they lost in the first round to Dinamo Zagreb, then representing Yugoslavia, 2–8 on aggregate. The first game in Vratsa, in the presence of 35,000 spectators, ended with a 2–1 loss. The second game in Zagreb finished 6–1.

The biggest success in the Bulgarian Cup is a semi-final in 1960–61, 1974–75 and 1984–85. After the 1989–90 A Group season, Botev was relegated to B Group. In the next 19 years, the club participated in either the second or the third Bulgarian division.

Botev managed to return to the top flight in 2011, after they won the eastern group of the 2010–11 B Group, thus ending a 21-year absence from the top level of Bulgarian football. The 2011-12 A Group season was successful because Botev avoided relegation, finishing 12th, which was the main goal of the club. The next season was less successful, with Botev finishing 13th, which meant that they were relegated after a two-year spell in the top flight. In the next couple of years, Botev Vratsa bounced between the second and third tiers, until 2018, when the team managed to return to the top flight, by winning the 2017-18 Second League. This ended a 5-year absence from the top flight.

Among the club's legendary players is Martin Petrov, considered by most Botev fans as the greatest player to have ever been involved with the club, and one of the greatest Bulgarian players. The list of other famous players to have come from the clubs' youth system consists of Iliya Valov, Valentin Iliev, and Valentin Stanchev. Nikolay Penkov is the player with most league appearances for the club – 334. The player with most league goals for the club is Georgi Kamenov, with 150 goals for Botev.

== Colours, signs and symbols ==
Botev is known as one of the "green" teams in Bulgaria, but red is just as characteristic in the club's history. Until 1971, the home colours were red and black vertical stripes. To commemorate the 50th anniversary, officials decided to re-brand the entire image of Botev by selecting green as main colour from 1972 on. At the same time, the club logo was also changed, selecting a lion as its centerpiece to commemorate the revolutionary flags of the Hristo Botev revolutionaries. Until that point, the portrait of Hristo Botev himself was used as club logo. The most recent re-branding of the club was in 2009, when the fans initiated a return of the lion to the club logo, almost 15 years after it had been removed. The new logo, which incorporated the original graphic from 1971 was crafted by lifelong fan Aleksandar Alekov.

== Honours ==
=== Domestic ===
- First League
  - Third place (1): 1970–71
- Bulgarian Cup:
  - Semi-finals (3): 1960–61, 1974–75, 2024–25
- Second League:
  - Winners (3): 1963–64, 2010–11, 2017–18

== European record ==
=== Matches ===
Season	Competition	Round	Club	Home	Away	Aggregate
1971–72	UEFA Cup	1R	(Socialist Federal Republic of Yugoslavia) Dinamo Zagreb	1−2	1−6	2−8
1983	Intertoto Cup	Group 8	(Sweden) Hammarby	1–2	1–2	3rd
1983	Intertoto Cup	Group 8	(West Germany) Arminia Bielefeld	0–1	0–4	3rd
1983	Intertoto Cup	Group 8	(Norway) Bryne	1–0	3–0	3rd

Competition	S	P	W	D	L	GF	GA	GD
UEFA Europa League / UEFA Cup	1	2	0	0	2	2	8	6
UEFA Intertoto Cup	1	6	2	0	4	6	9	3
Total	2	8	2	0	6	8	17	9

== Players ==
=== Current squad ===
As of 18 July 2026

Note: Flags indicate national team as defined under FIFA eligibility rules; some limited exceptions apply. Players may hold more than one non-FIFA nationality.

No.	Pos.	Nation	Player
2	DF	BUL	Miroslav Tsonev
3	DF	GAM	Sainey Sanyang (on loan from CSKA Sofia)
4	DF	BUL	Ivan Goranov
6	MF	BUL	Abdula Kichukov (on loan from CSKA Sofia II)
7	MF	BUL	Radoslav Tsonev
8	MF	BUL	Antoan Stoyanov
9	FW	BUL	Daniel Genov (captain)
10	MF	USA	Jose Gallegos
11	DF	BUL	Martin Achkov
12	MF	BUL	Iliya Yurukov
17	MF	BUL	Samuil Mechev
21	DF	BUL	Martin Dimitrov
23	GK	BUL	Lyuboslav Stoyanov

No.	Pos.	Nation	Player
24	MF	BUL	Martin Smolenski
25	DF	BUL	Aleksandar Buchkov
36	DF	BUL	Milen Stoev
55	DF	BIH	Đorđe Jovičić
79	FW	BUL	Martin Petkov
81	MF	COM	Kassim Hadji
88	DF	BUL	Lazar Boyanov
90	FW	BUL	Filip Gigov (on loan from CSKA Sofia)
94	GK	BUL	Marin Orlinov
97	FW	BUL	Vladislav Naydenov
98	GK	BUL	Lyubomir Vasilev
99	FW	BUL	Preslav Borukov
—	MF	BEN	David Tchétchao Karo

For recent transfers, see Transfers winter 2025–26 and Transfers summer 2026.

=== Out on loan ===
Note: Flags indicate national team as defined under FIFA eligibility rules; some limited exceptions apply. Players may hold more than one non-FIFA nationality.

No.	Pos.	Nation	Player
—	DF	BEN	Tamimou Ouorou (at CSKA Sofia until 30 June 2027)

=== Foreign players ===
Up to twenty foreign nationals can be registered and given a squad number for the first team in the Bulgarian First League, however only five non-EU nationals can be used during a match day. Those non-EU nationals with European ancestry can claim citizenship from the nation their ancestors came from. If a player does not have European ancestry he can claim Bulgarian citizenship after playing in Bulgaria for 5 years.

EU Nationals

EU Nationals (Dual citizenship)

- (Comoros) (France) Kassim Hadji

Non-EU Nationals

- (Bosnia and Herzegovina) (Serbia) Đorđe Jovičić
- (The Gambia) Sainey Sanyang
- (Benin) David Tchétchao Karo
- (United States) (Mexico) Jose Gallegos

== Notable players ==
Had international caps for their respective countries, held any club record, or had more than 100 league appearances. Players whose name is listed in bold represented their countries.

Bulgaria

- (Bulgaria) Petar Alyoshev
- (Bulgaria) **Georgi Antonov**
- (Bulgaria) **Petar Atanasov**
- (Bulgaria) **Lachezar Baltanov**
- (Bulgaria) **Valeri Bojinov**
- (Bulgaria) **Daniel Bozhkov**
- (Bulgaria) **Valeri Domovchiyski**
- (Bulgaria) **Daniel Genov**
- (Bulgaria) **Ivo Georgiev**
- (Bulgaria) **Nikola Hristov**
- (Bulgaria) **Valentin Iliev**
- (Bulgaria) **Mihail Ivanov**
- (Bulgaria) Georgi Kamenov
- (Bulgaria) **Todor Kolev**
- (Bulgaria) Krasimir Kostov
- (Bulgaria) **Andrian Kraev**
- (Bulgaria) Ruslan Kuang
- (Bulgaria) **Angel Lyaskov**
- (Bulgaria) **Ivaylo Mihaylov**
- (Bulgaria) Tihomir Naydenov
- (Bulgaria) **Valentin Naydenov**
- (Bulgaria) Yuliyan Nenov
- (Bulgaria) **Nikolay Penkov**
- (Bulgaria) **Martin Petrov**
- (Bulgaria) **Apostol Popov**
- (Bulgaria) Rumen Rangelov
- (Bulgaria) Svetlin Simeonov
- (Bulgaria) **Valentin Stanchev**
- (Bulgaria) **Radoslav Tsonev**
- (Bulgaria) **Momchil Tsvetanov**
- (Bulgaria) **Svetoslav Valeriev**
- (Bulgaria) **Iliya Valov**
- (Bulgaria) **Iliya Voynov**
- (Bulgaria) **Dominik Yankov**
- (Bulgaria) **Tsvetan Yonchev**
- (Bulgaria) **Atanas Zehirov**
- (Bulgaria) **Hristo Zlatinski**

Europe

- (Estonia) **Edgar Tur**
- (North Macedonia) **Dorian Babunski**

Africa

- (Benin) **Saturnin Allagbé**
- (Central African Republic) **Marco Majouga**
- (Republic of the Congo) **Messie Biatoumoussoka**

Asia

- (Lebanon) **Samir Ayass**
- (Tajikistan) **Iskandar Dzhalilov**

== Managers ==
- (Bulgaria) Sasho Angelov (2009–11)
- (Bulgaria) Atanas Dzhambazki (Sept 2011 – Oct 11)
- (Bulgaria) Todor Garev (Oct 2011 – Dec 11)
- (Bulgaria) Antoni Zdravkov (Dec 2011 – Aug 12)
- (Italy) Giuliano Sonzogni (Aug 2012 – Sept 12)
- (Bulgaria) Antoni Zdravkov (Sept 2012 – June 2013)
- (Bulgaria) Yasen Petrov (June 2013 – September 2013)
- (Bulgaria) Boyko Velichkov (December 2013 – June 2014)
- (Bulgaria) Viktorio Pavlov (June 2014 – November 2014)
- (Bulgaria) Adalbert Zafirov (December 2014 – April 2015)
- (Bulgaria) Atanas Dzhambazki (May 2015– November 2015)
- (Bulgaria) Nikolay Todorov (December 2015–May 2016)
- (Bulgaria) Boyko Velichkov (May 2016–November 2016)
- (Bulgaria) Sasho Angelov (November 2016–November 2019)
- (Bulgaria) Antoni Zdravkov (November 2019–March 2021)
- (Bulgaria) Veselin Velikov (March 2021–June 2021)
- (Brazil) (Bulgaria) Daniel Morales (June 2021–March 2022)
- (Bulgaria) Ivaylo Dimitrov (March 2022–May 2022)
- (Italy) Gennaro Iezzo (May 2022–June 2022)
- (Bulgaria) Rosen Kirilov (June 2022–September 2022)
- (Brazil) (Bulgaria) Daniel Morales (September 2022–September 2023)
- (Bulgaria) Hristo Yanev (September 2023–June 2024)
- (Bulgaria) Hristo Yanev (September 2024–September 2025)
- (Bulgaria) Todor Simov (September 2025–)

== Kit ==
Period	Kit manufacturer	Shirt sponsor (chest / back)
2019–2022	(Italy) Erreà	WINBET
2022–2023	(Italy) Zeus	WINBET / SportRespect
2023–2024	(United States) Nike	WINBET / SportRespect
2024–	(Germany) Erima	WINBET
