= Vrachanska Skaklya =

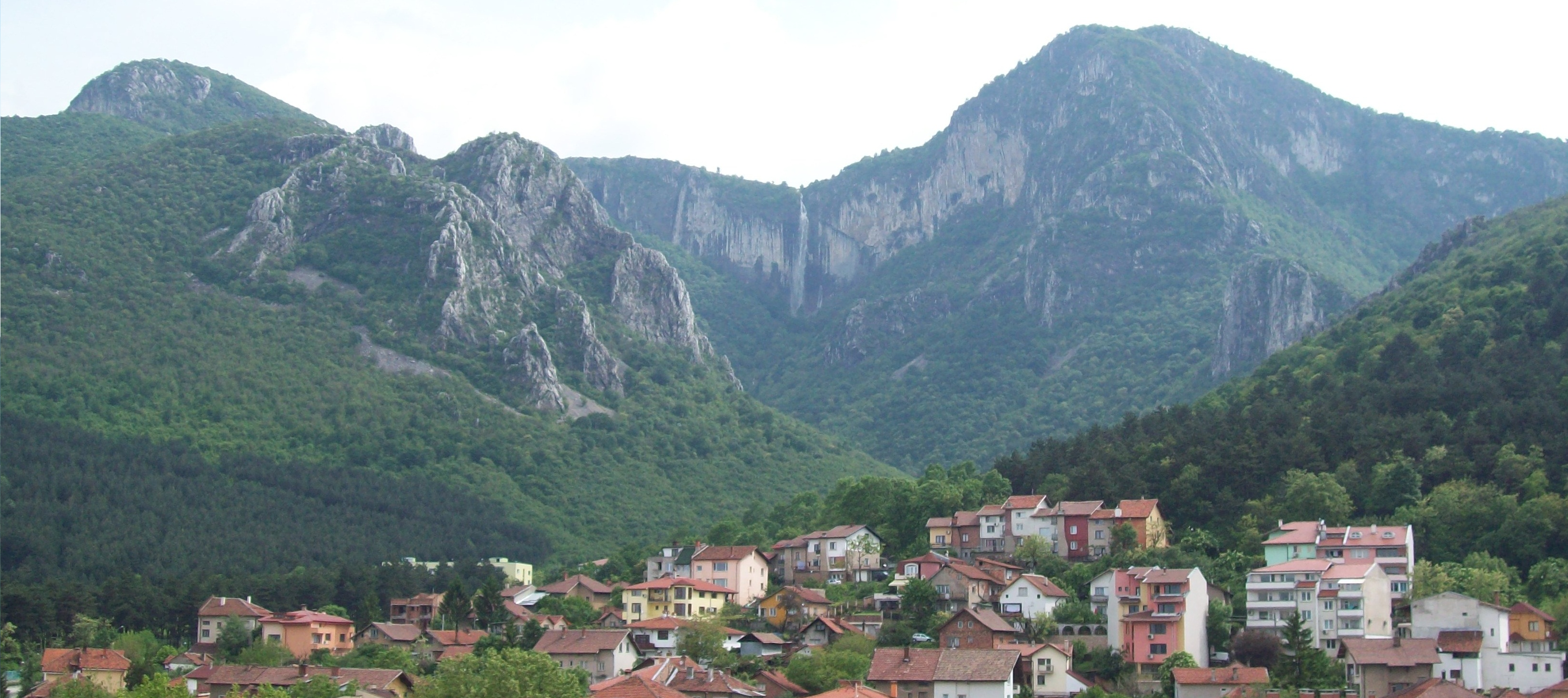
- Vratsa with Vrachanska Skaklya in the background
- Interactive map of Vrachanska Skaklya
- Location: Vrachanski Balkan Nature Park, Bulgaria
- Coordinates: 43°11′10.96″N 23°33′07.69″E
- Type: Plunge
- Elevation: 900 m (3,000 ft)
- Total height: 141 or 148 m
- Number of drops: 1
- Total width: up to 20 m

Vrachanska Skaklya (Bulgarian: Врачанска Скакля) or Skaklya is a plunge waterfall in the Vrachanski Balkan Nature Park of Vratsa Province in northwestern Bulgaria. With a height of 141 or 148 m, it is claimed to be the highest intermittently flowing waterfall in Bulgaria and the Balkans. The waterfall lies 1.5 km south of Vratsa, behind the Kaleto hill, and can be observed from the town centre.

The Vrachanska Skaklya waterfall is protected as part of the Vrachanski Karst Reserve within the nature park. Several marked tourist trails lead to the waterfall, with lengths ranging from 1.5 to 5 km.

The waterfall is at its most powerful in May and June, when its flow rate averages 200 litres per second (with a recorded maximum of around 300 L/s). In spring, Vrachanska Skaklya is up to 20 metres wide. During the rest of the year, its flow rate is much reduced and in August and September, it typically dries up entirely. When the waterfall freezes in winter, it is popular as an ice climbing destination.
