= Stadion Hristo Botev (Vratsa) =

Sports venue in Vratsa, Bulgaria

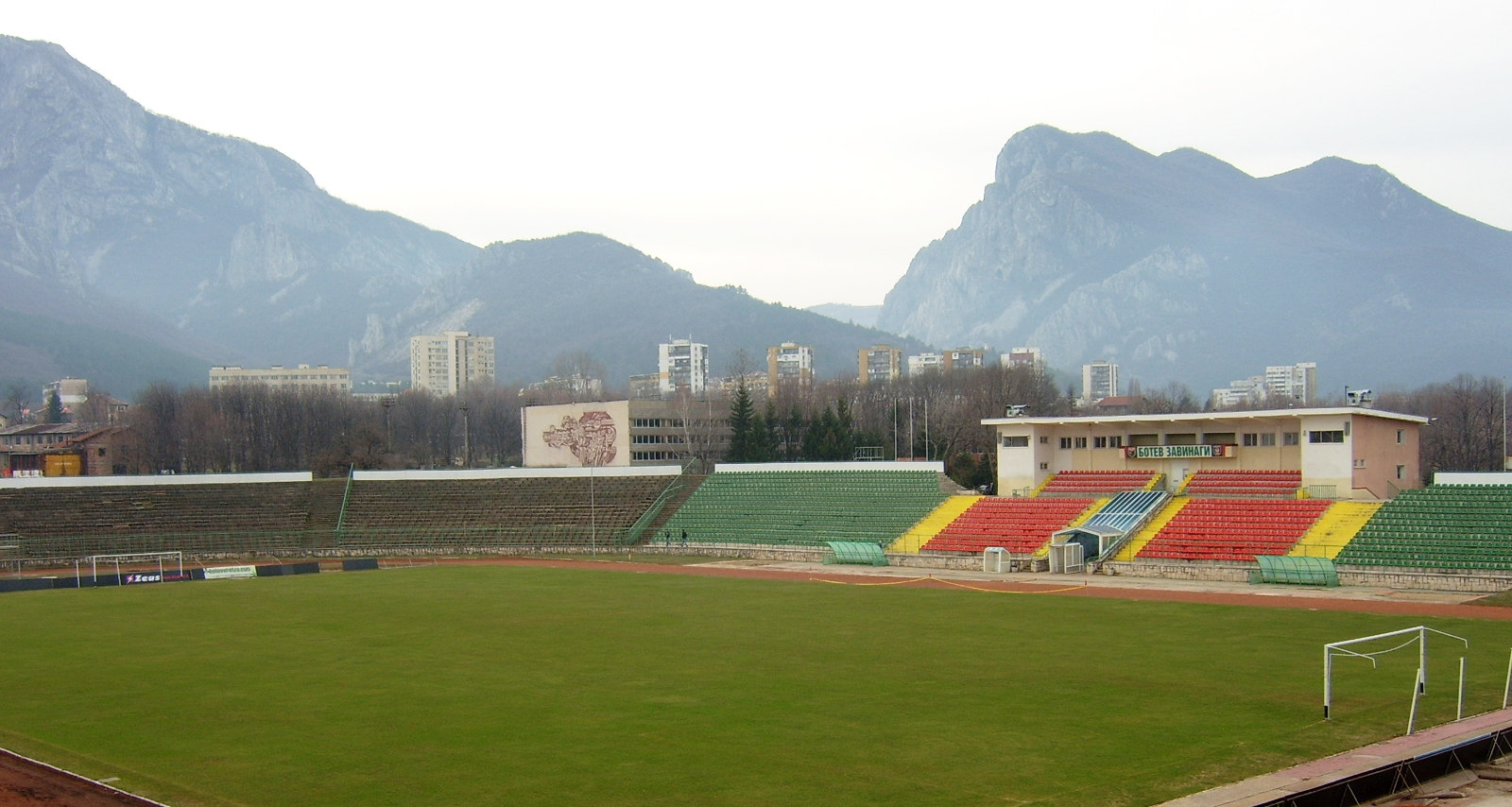
- Interactive map of Stadion Hristo Botev
- Full name: Hristo Botev Stadium
- Location: Vratsa, Bulgaria
- Coordinates: 43°12′03.1″N 23°34′07.3″E
- Owner: Municipality of Vratsa
- Operator: Botev Vratsa
- Capacity: 25 000
- Surface: Grass

Construction
- Groundbreaking: 1946
- Built: 1946 - 1948
- Opened: 1948
- Renovated: 2008, 2009, 2015, 2022

Tenant
- Botev Vratsa (1948-present)

Stadion Hristo Botev (Bulgarian: Стадион "Христо Ботев", English: 'Hristo Botev Stadium') is a multi-purpose stadium in Vratsa, Bulgaria. It is currently used mostly for football matches. It has been the home of Botev Vratsa for 70 years. The stadium was built in 1948 and has a seating capacity of 8,935 spectators.

== Renovation ==
After the approval of a project worth €150,000, in 2008 the stadium was renovated and had 2,255 seats, spread in the 3 central sectors.

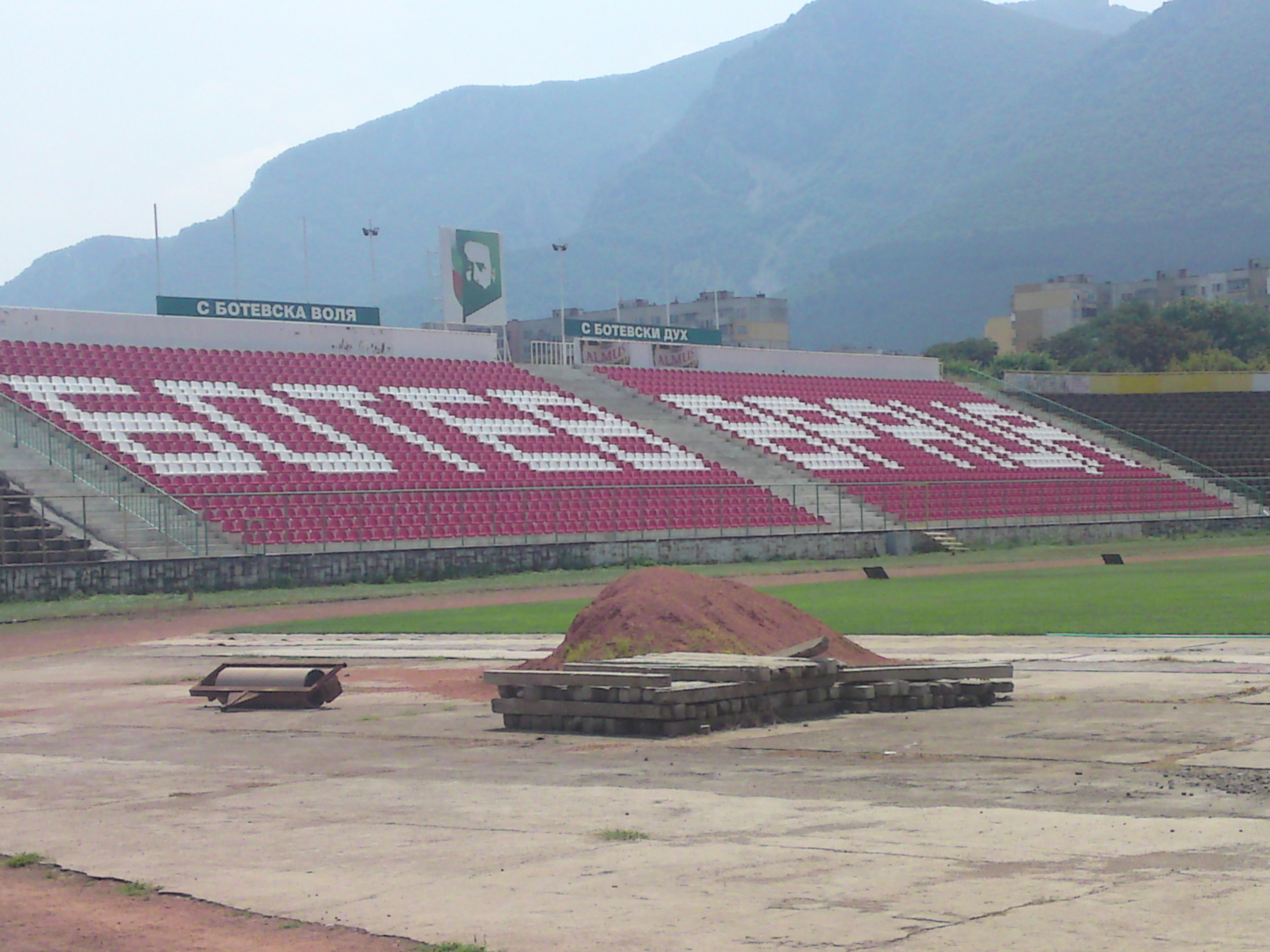
Sector "V" 2010

In June 2009, the Botev Vratsa management approved a second project, worth €120,000 for reconstruction of sector "V", opposite the central building of the stadium. The second renovation was completed in 2009. As of 2009, the stadium has 4,455 plastic seats. In October 2009, the stadium received a license from the Bulgarian Football Union to host games from all divisions of Bulgarian football.

In 2015 the main building and the football field are being renovated. Also two side sectors, which increase the seating capacity to 6,417 spectators.

In 2018 floodlights system were installed.

In 2021 LED scoreboard were installed.

In 2022 sector "G" were renovated, which increase the seating capacity to 8,935.
