= Đorđe Jovičić =

Bosnian footballer of Serbian ethnicity

Personal information
- Full name: Ђорђе Јовичић
- Date of birth: 11 November 2001 (age 24)
- Place of birth: Šabac, Serbia and Montenegro
- Height: 1.93 m (6 ft 4 in)
- Position: Centre back

Team information
- Current team: Botev Vratsa
- Number: 55

Youth career
- –2016: Vojvodina
- 2017–2019: Red Star Belgrade
- 2020–2022: Braga

Senior career*
Years	Team	Apps	(Gls)
2020–2022	Braga	0	(0)
2021–2022	→ Trenčín (loan)	2	(0)
2021	→ Dubnica (loan)	5	(0)
2023–2024	Podgorica	30	(3)
2024–2025	Żabbar St. Patrick	28	(1)
2025	Sloga Meridian	6	(0)
2026–	Botev Vratsa	10	(0)

International career
2017	Bosnia U17	2	(0)
- * Club domestic league appearances and goals as of 11 June 2026

Đorđe Jovičić (Serbian Cyrillic: Ђорђе Јовичић; born 11 November 2001) is an ethnic Serbian professional footballer from Bosnia and Herzegovina who plays as a defender for Bulgarian First League club Botev Vratsa. He holds both nationalities.

He had also played for Fortuna Liga club AS Trenčín.

== Club career ==
=== AS Trenčín ===
Jovičić had signed with AS Trenčín on a one-year loan with club option for transfer in the summer of 2021. Jovičić explained, that he agreed to a spell in the Fortuna Liga following advice from Hamza Čataković to increase play time he was unable to collect at Braga. Jovičić made his professional Fortuna Liga debut for Trenčín in home defeat at na Sihoti against DAC Dunajská Streda (0–1). He completed the entirety of the match.

=== Botev Vratsa ===
In February 2026 he joined Bulgarian team Botev Vratsa.
