= Vrachanski Balkan Nature Park =

Nature park in Bulgaria

- IUCN category V (protected landscape/seascape)
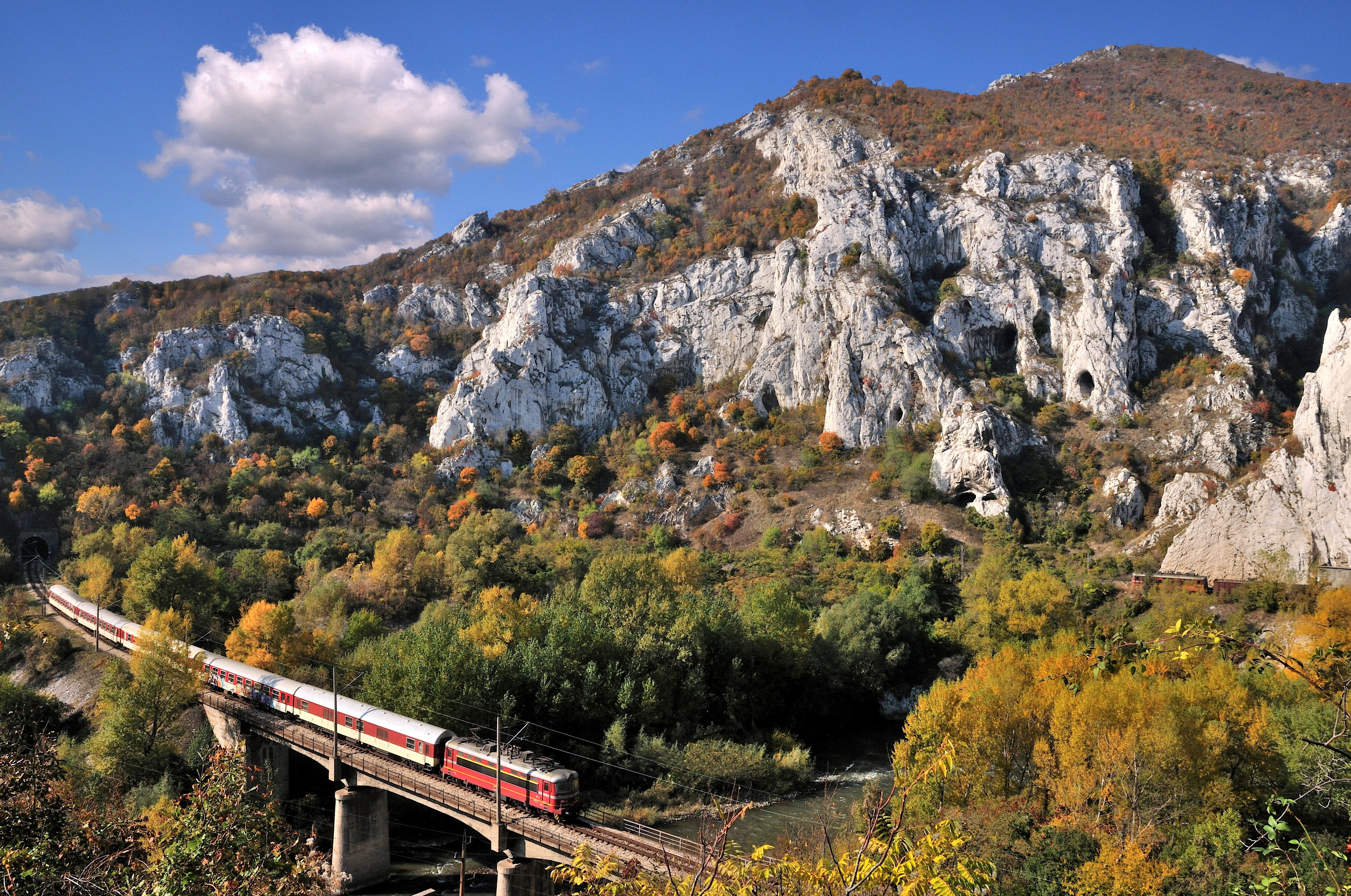
- Iskar Gorge in Vrachanski Balkan Nature Park

- Location within Bulgaria
- Location: Vratsa, Krivodol, Mezdra, Varshets, and Svoge Municipalities, Bulgaria
- Nearest city: Vratsa
- Coordinates: 43.172509°N 23.482246°E
- Area: 30,129.9 ha (74,453 acres)
- Established: 1989
- Governing body: Ministry of Environment and Water

Vrachanski Balkan Nature Park (Bulgarian: Природен парк „Врачански Балкан“) is a nature park in Bulgaria with an area of 30129.9 ha established on 21 December 1989.

== Park administration ==
Vrachanski Balkan Nature Park is administered by a directorate subordinated to the Executive Forest Agency of the Ministry of Environment and Water of Bulgaria.

== Geography ==
Vrachanski Balkan Nature Park is situated in the municipalities Vratsa, Krivodol, Mezdra, Varshets, and Svoge.

== Biology ==
=== Flora ===
The flora of Vranchanski Balkan Nature Park includes ca. 1100 vascular plants, which accounts for ca. 28% of Bulgarian flora. In the nature park live endemic species, among which are the scarcely disseminated in Bulgaria Campanula jordanovii, Centranthus kellereri, Chamaecytisus kovacevii, Silene velcevii, as well as Centranthus kellereri and Silene velcevii, which account for ca. 50% of their global population.

Among the endemic species, which can be found also in other Balkan countries are Acanthus balcanicus, Achillea ageratifolia, Armeria rumelica, Centaurea chrysolepis, Cephalaria flava, Cerastium moesiacum, Crocus veluchensis, Dianthus cruentus, Digitalis viridiflora, Erysimum comatum, Gentianella bulgarica, Iris reichenbachii, Lilium jankae, Pedicularis grisebachii, Peucedanum aegopodioides, Sesleria latifolia, Silene sendtneri, and Vicia truncatula.

13 species are included in the "Red book of Republic Bulgaria". The territory of the park is included in the European Union network of nature protection areas Natura 2000.

=== Fauna ===
In Vrachanski Balkan Nature Park there are around 1231 different invertebrates. It is an important region for butterflies in Bulgaria. The amphibians in the nature park are 11, and the 15 reptiles. Among them 20 are protected by law, all are included in the Bern Convention. From the over 180 birds species in the nature park, 157 are protected by law, and 38 are included in the "Red book of Republic Bulgaria". There are 36 mammals species in the nature park, among which 9 are protected on national level, 20 - on European level and 9 on international level. Some of them are forest dormouse, southern white-breasted hedgehog, European badger, European otter, European polecat, wildcat, and roe deer. In the nature park live 22 of the 33 bat species, which live in Bulgaria.
