= Vratsa =

City in Bulgaria

Vratsa Враца
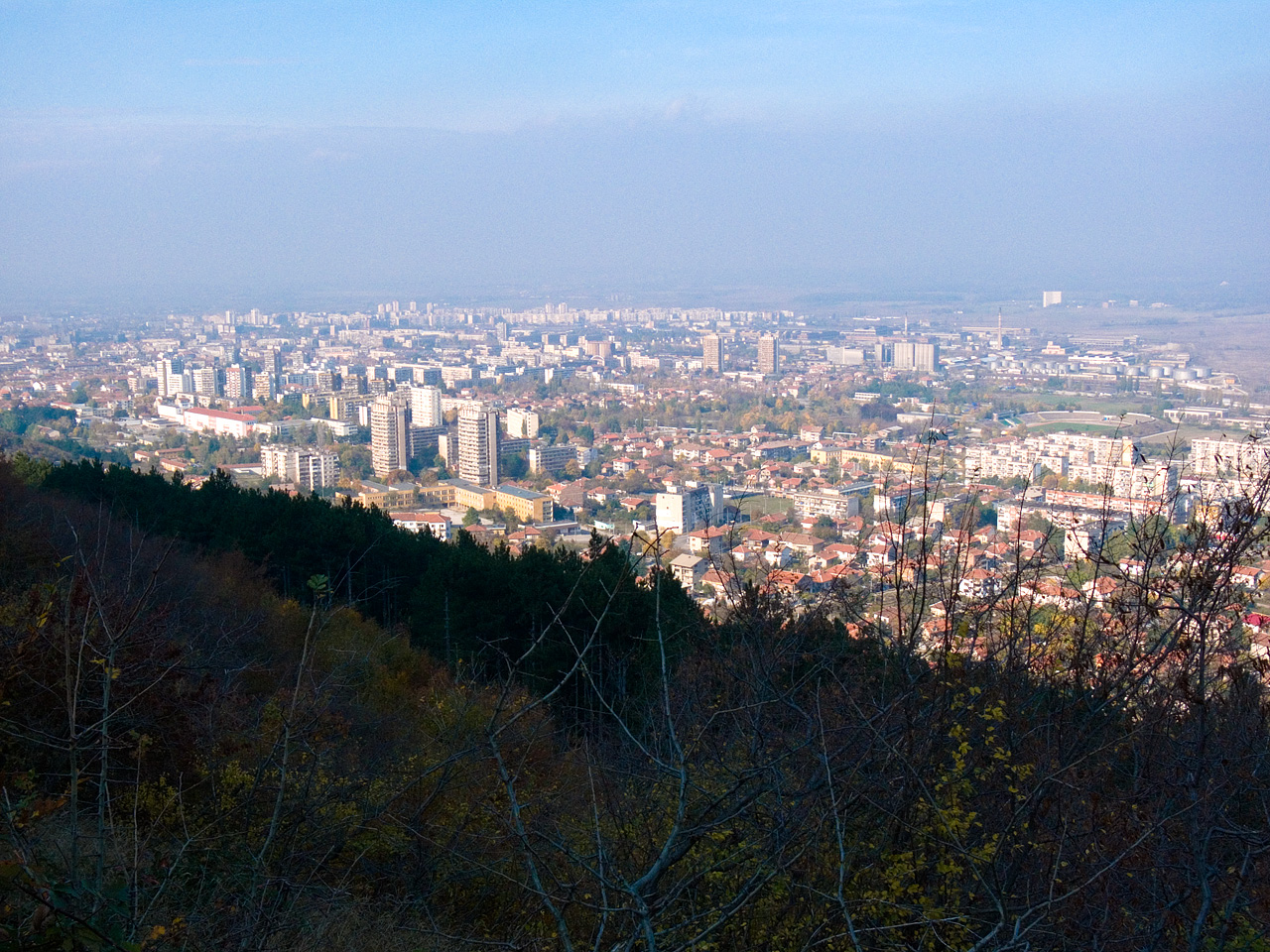
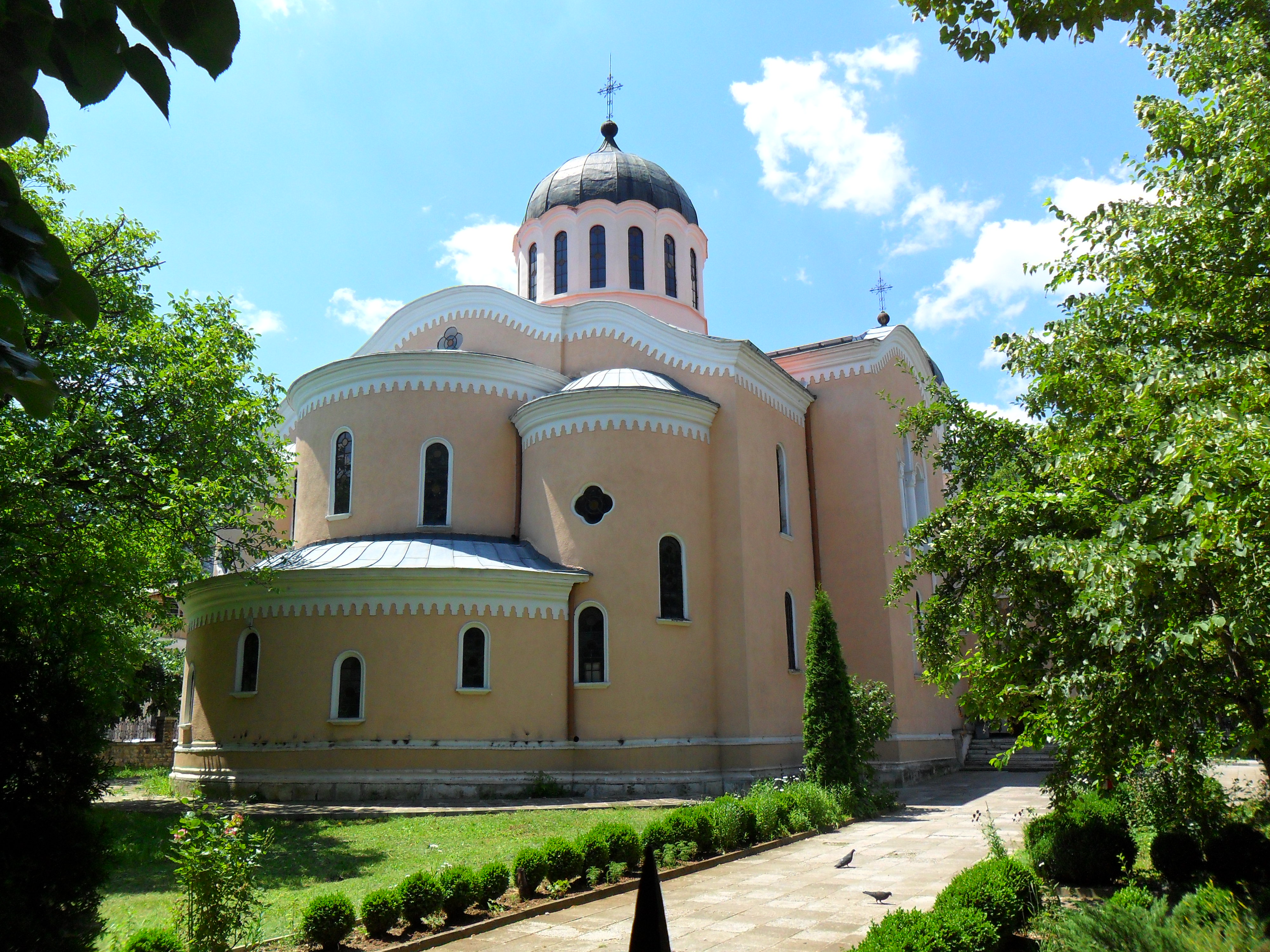
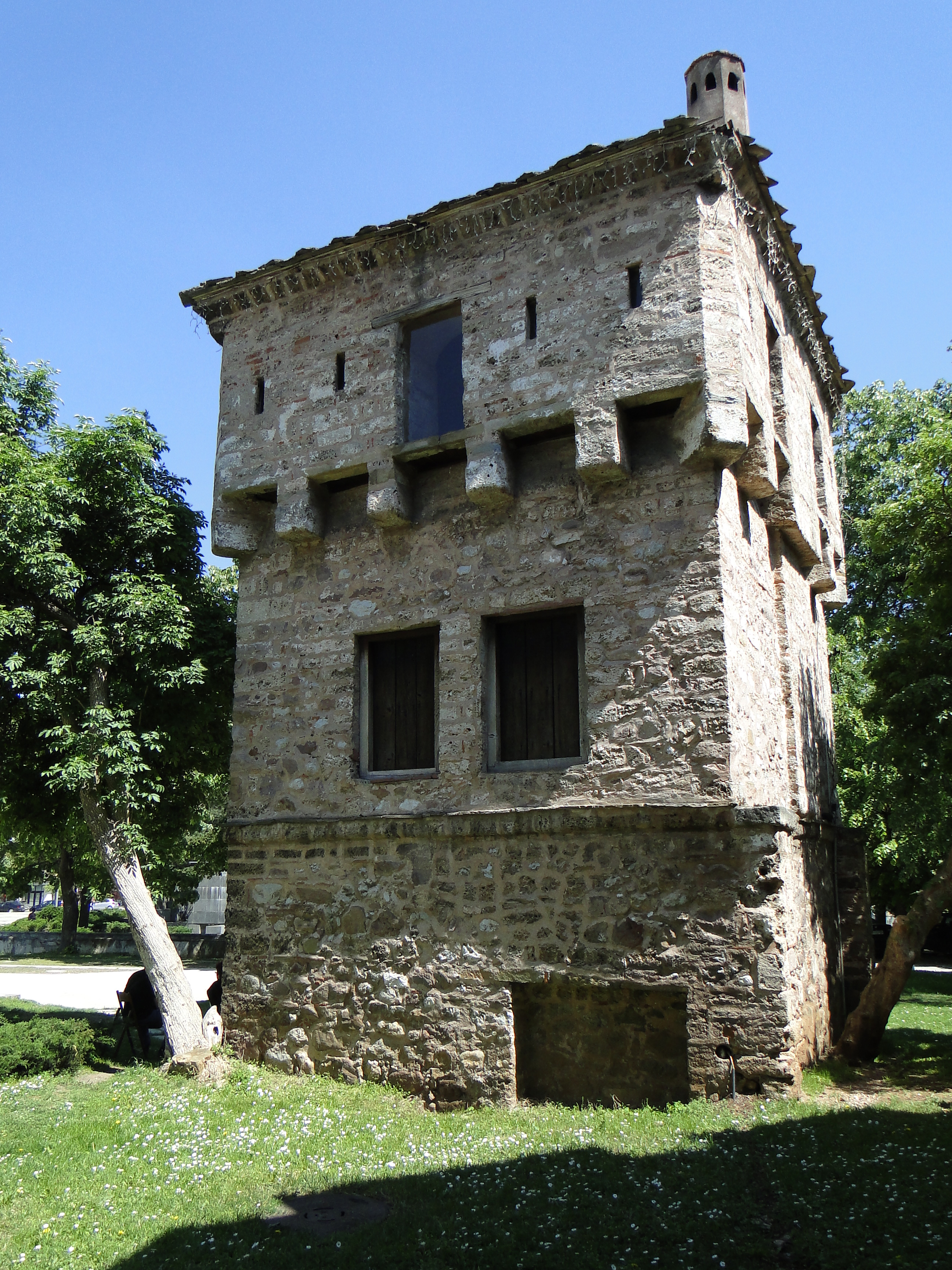
- From the top, view of Vratsa, Holy Apostles church, Tower of Kurt Pasha

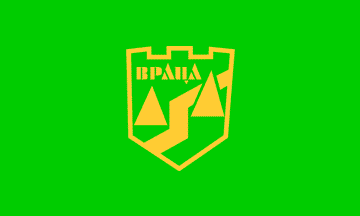
- Flag Coat of arms
- Motto: Vratsa, city like the Balkan – ancient and young. (Враца, град като Балкана – древен и млад.)
- Location of Vratsa Vratsa (Balkans)
- Coordinates: 43°12′N 23°33′E
- Country: Bulgaria
- Province: Vratsa

Government
  - Mayor: Kalin Kamenov (GERB)

Area
  - City: 212 km^{2} (82 sq mi)
- Elevation: 344 m (1,129 ft)

Population (2022)
  - City: 49,569
  - Urban: 60,361
- Time zone: UTC+2 (EET)
  - Summer (DST): UTC+3 (EEST)
- Postal Code: 3000
- Area code: 092
- Website: Official website

Vratsa (Bulgarian: Враца [ˈvrat͡sɐ]) is the largest city in northwestern Bulgaria and the administrative and economic centre of the municipality of Vratsa and Vratsa Province. It is about 112 km (70 mi) north of Sofia, 40 km (25 mi) southeast of Montana.

Situated at the foot of the Vrachanski Balkan, the town is near numerous caves, waterfalls, and rock formations. The most famous of them are the Ledenika Cave, Skaklya Waterfall, and the Vratsata Pass.

The Vratsa History Museum holds the Rogozen treasure, which is the largest Thracian treasure.

Botev Days are held annually in the city, culminating in the rally-dawn on 1 June, held at Hristo Botev Square, as well as the national worship on 2 June at Mount Okolchitsa.

Vratsa's motto is "A city like the Balkan – ancient and young".

== Name ==
The name comes from the Vratsata Pass nearby, and derives from the Slavic word vrata ("gate") + the Slavic diminutive placename suffix -itsa, "little gate", used to translate the Latin name Valve ("double door"). The name of the town during Ottoman era was recorded as Ivraca.

== History ==
The Ottoman census records of the early 1550s indicate that İvraca was in a continuous development. According to this, there were 82 Muslim households, corresponding to approximately 400 people, and a mosque, later known as "Eski Camii", with also a population of 31 unmarried males. The Christians living in 12 neighborhoods, on the other hand, reached a population of approximately 1840 with 354 households and 172 unmarried males. At this time the ratio of the Muslim population to the general population increased to 18%. In addition, it is mentioned in the defter that the Muslim and non-Muslim population in the city and some residents of the 2 neighbouring villages were working in the mines and therefore these workers and their families were exempted from the avarız property tax. In 1580, Muslims made up 30% of the total population. At that time, the city had 3 Muslim neighborhoods (mahalle-i Câmi-i Atik, Mahalle-i Câmi-i Cedid, Mustafa Çavuş Mescidi mhalle). There were a total of 258 households in these neighbourhoods. The Christian population also increased, reaching a total of 583 households in 12 neighborhoods named after their priests. Apart from these, there were seven Coptic mining households whose statuses were recognized in 1550. The number of monasteries, which was 4 up to this date, increased to 8.

1831 Ottoman population statistics show that 74% of the Christians were non-taxpayers in the kaza of İvraca and 83% of the Christians were recorded as middle-class.

== Geography ==
The city of Vratsa is located in the foothills of "Vrachanski Balkan" (Vratsa Mountain), on the banks of Leva River, 116 km (72 mi) from the national capital Sofia.

The area has diverse natural features. Several protected natural attractions and historical monuments are located on the territory of the Vratsa State Forestry.

=== Climate ===
The climate is humid continental with hot summers and cold winters. The average annual temperature is about 11 °C (52 °F). Climate in this area has noticeable differences between highs and lows, and there is adequate rainfall year-round. The Köppen Climate Classification subtype for this climate is "Dfa" – humid continental climate.

Climate data for Vratsa (2002–2012)
Month	Jan	Feb	Mar	Apr	May	Jun	Jul	Aug	Sep	Oct	Nov	Dec	Year
Mean daily maximum °C (°F)	3.2 (37.8)	5.8 (42.4)	11.0 (51.8)	17.5 (63.5)	23.1 (73.6)	26.8 (80.2)	29.5 (85.1)	29.7 (85.5)	25.3 (77.5)	18.4 (65.1)	11.6 (52.9)	5.3 (41.5)	17.3 (63.1)
Daily mean °C (°F)	−0.6 (30.9)	1.6 (34.9)	6.4 (43.5)	12.5 (54.5)	18.1 (64.6)	21.8 (71.2)	24.1 (75.4)	24.1 (75.4)	20.0 (68.0)	13.5 (56.3)	7.9 (46.2)	1.8 (35.2)	12.6 (54.7)
Mean daily minimum °C (°F)	−4.3 (24.3)	−2.7 (27.1)	1.8 (35.2)	7.5 (45.5)	12.1 (53.8)	15.8 (60.4)	17.7 (63.9)	17.5 (63.5)	13.6 (56.5)	8.5 (47.3)	3.7 (38.7)	−1.4 (29.5)	7.5 (45.5)
Average precipitation mm (inches)	48 (1.9)	41 (1.6)	52 (2.0)	71 (2.8)	112 (4.4)	106 (4.2)	78 (3.1)	61 (2.4)	59 (2.3)	65 (2.6)	62 (2.4)	54 (2.1)	809 (31.9)
Source: Stringmeteo.org

== Population ==
The number of the residents of the city reached its peak in the period 1990–1991 when it exceeded 85,000. As of February 2011, the town had a population of 60,692 inhabitants.

Historical population
Year	Pop.	±%
1887	11,323	—
1910	15,250	+34.7%
1934	16,177	+6.1%
1946	19,620	+21.3%
1956	26,582	+35.5%
1965	39,091	+47.1%
1975	61,134	+56.4%
1985	75,451	+23.4%
1992	75,518	+0.1%
2001	68,975	−8.7%
2011	60,692	−12.0%
2021	51,020	−15.9%
2022	50,012	−2.0%
Source: Censuses"National statistical institute". 31 October 2024.

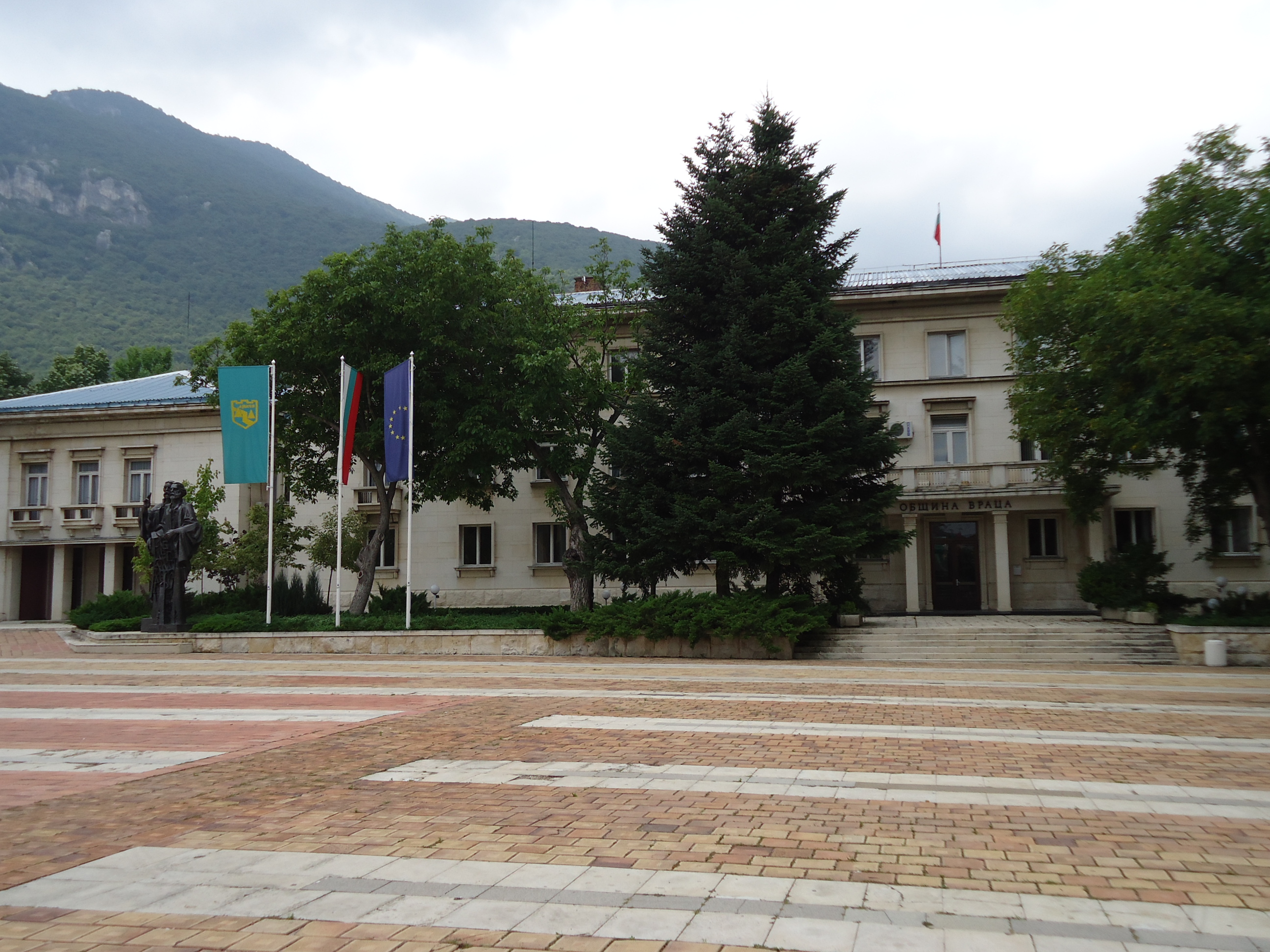
Municipality Vratsa

=== Ethnic, linguistic and religious composition ===
According to the latest 2011 census data, the individuals declared their ethnic identity were distributed as follows:

- Bulgarians: 53,275 (97.3%)
- Roma: 1,045 (1.9%)
- Turks: 54 (0.1%)
- Others: 185 (0.3%)
- Indefinable: 216 (0.4%)
  - Undeclared: 5,937 (9.8%)

Total: 60,692

The ethnic composition of Vratsa Municipality is 64334 Bulgarians and 2215 Gypsies among others.

== History ==
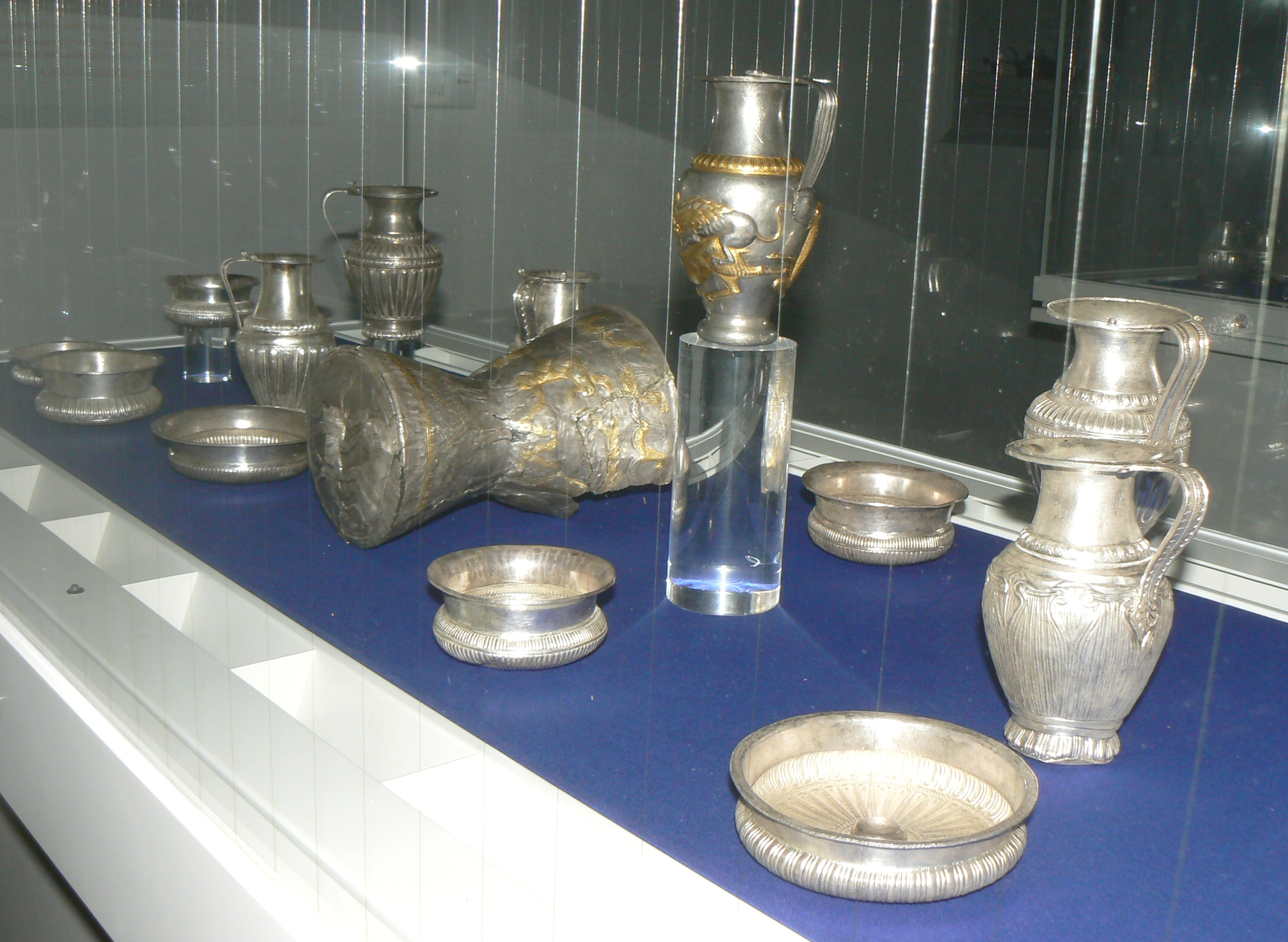
Rogozen Treasure – the biggest Thracian treasure that was ever discovered on the territory of Bulgaria

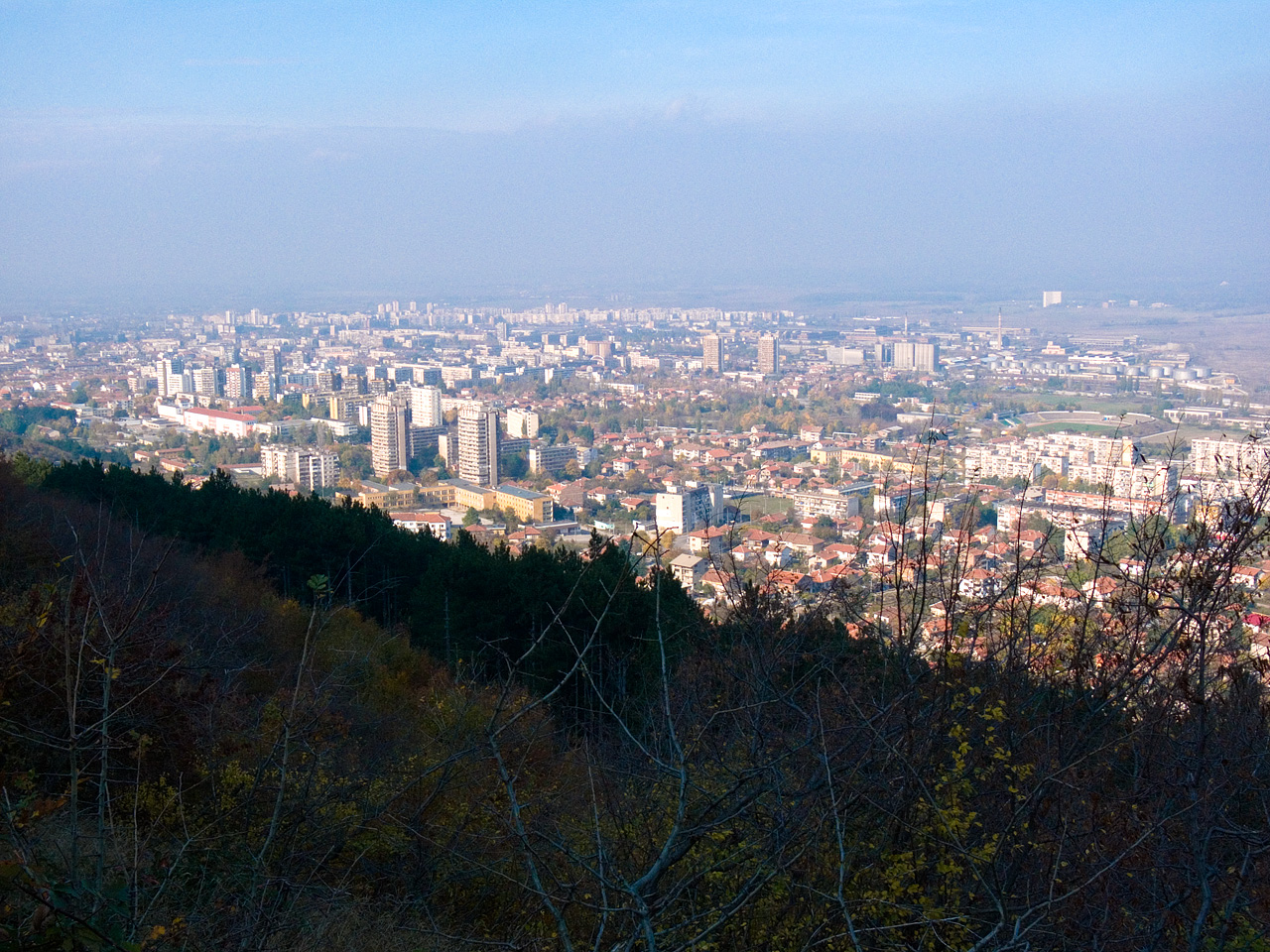
Vratsa – panoramic view

Vratsa is an ancient city found by ancient Thracians. Vratsa was called Valve ("door of a fortress") by the Romans due to a narrow passage where the main gate of the city fortress was located. Nowadays, this passage is the symbol of Vratsa, and is shown on the town's Coat of arms.

After the fall of Rome, Vratsa became part of the Eastern Roman Empire (Byzantium).

At the end of the 6th century AD, Vratsa was populated by the South Slavic tribes. Even if they came from Pannonia and Dacia on the north, the town remained under Byzantine rule.

In the 7th century, the Bulgars and the Slavs found the First Bulgarian Empire and the Slavic Vratsa became part of it. The city grew into important strategic location because of its proximity to the South State border. Vratsa became famous for its goldsmiths and silversmiths production and trade, high-quality earthenware and military significance.

In the 8th century, the Bulgarian army captured Sofia, which led to the decreasing of Vratsa's importance because of the better strategic position of Sofia, its more developed economy and larger size. But Vratsa was again key for the resistance against the Byzantine, Serbian and Magyar invasions in the Middle Ages.

On 1 May 1966 in the village of Sgorigrad, a Mir-Plakanista mine tailings dam collapsed, causing a flood of mud and debris that killed 488 people. It remains one of the biggest disasters in Vratsa since the 30 September 1923 fire and the Anglo-American bombing of 23 January 1944.

== Tourism ==
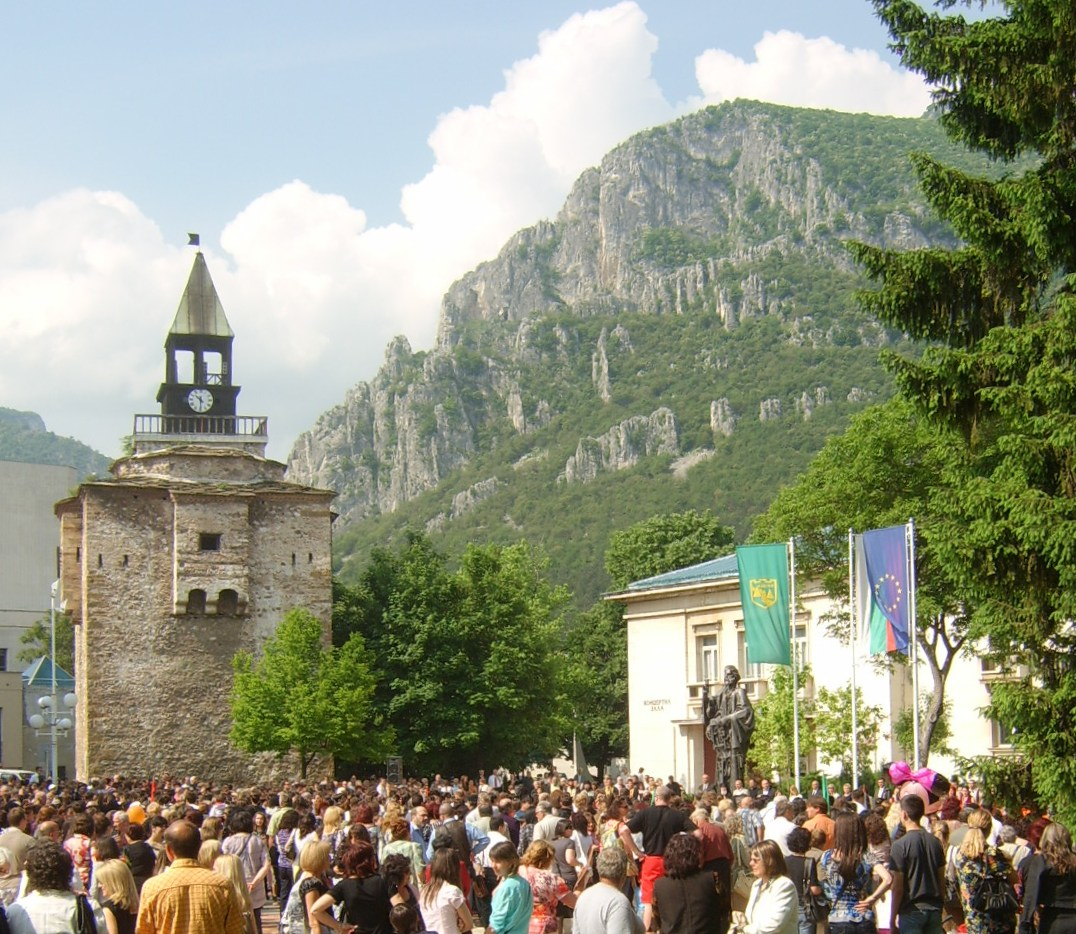
"The Tower of the Meshtchii"

The mountains and forests are suitable for development of different types of tourism – hunting and fishing, skiing, speleology, delta-gliding, photo-tourism, etc.

Sports practised in the area include mountaineering, cycling, hang gliding, paragliding, karting, buggy racing and motocross.

Leisure facilities include swimming pools for children and adults, water cycles, discos, bars, restaurants and hotels. There are rope tows for skiers near the Parshevitsa Chalet.

There are also a Museum of History and an Ethnographic and Revival Complex.

== Main sights ==
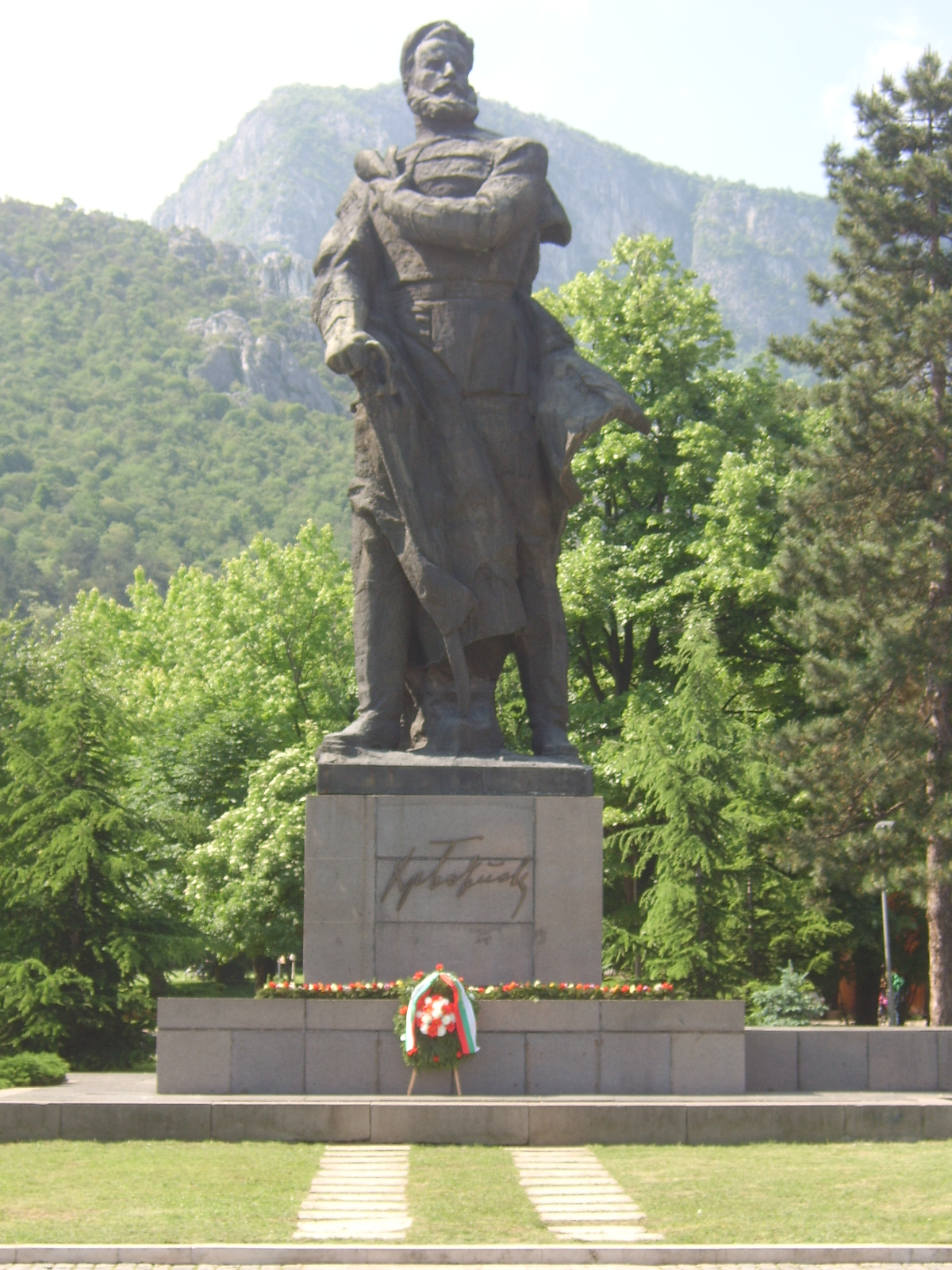
Hristo Botev monument

=== Ledenika cave ===
Ledenika is the most frequently visited Bulgarian cave.
Ledenika is located in the Stresherski part of the Vratsa mountain. Its entrance being at 830m above sea level. It features an abundance of galleries and impressive karst formations including stalactites and stalagmites, dating back a thousand years. The cave is about 300m long and contains ten separate halls. The cave is part of the 100 Tourist Sites of Bulgaria

=== Vratsata Gorge ===
Vratsata Gorge – the highest cliffs on the Balkan Peninsula (400 meters high).
Vratsata Gorge is situated in Vratsa Mountain. The area is easily accessible from Vratsa. The limestone of Vratsata Central Wall and the other rocks offer many possibilities for climbing and alpinism, connected by more than 70 alpine routes of all categories of difficulty.

=== Skaklya waterfall ===
Skaklya waterfall – highest temporary waterfall in Bulgaria and the Balkans – 141 meters.

=== Regional historical museum ===
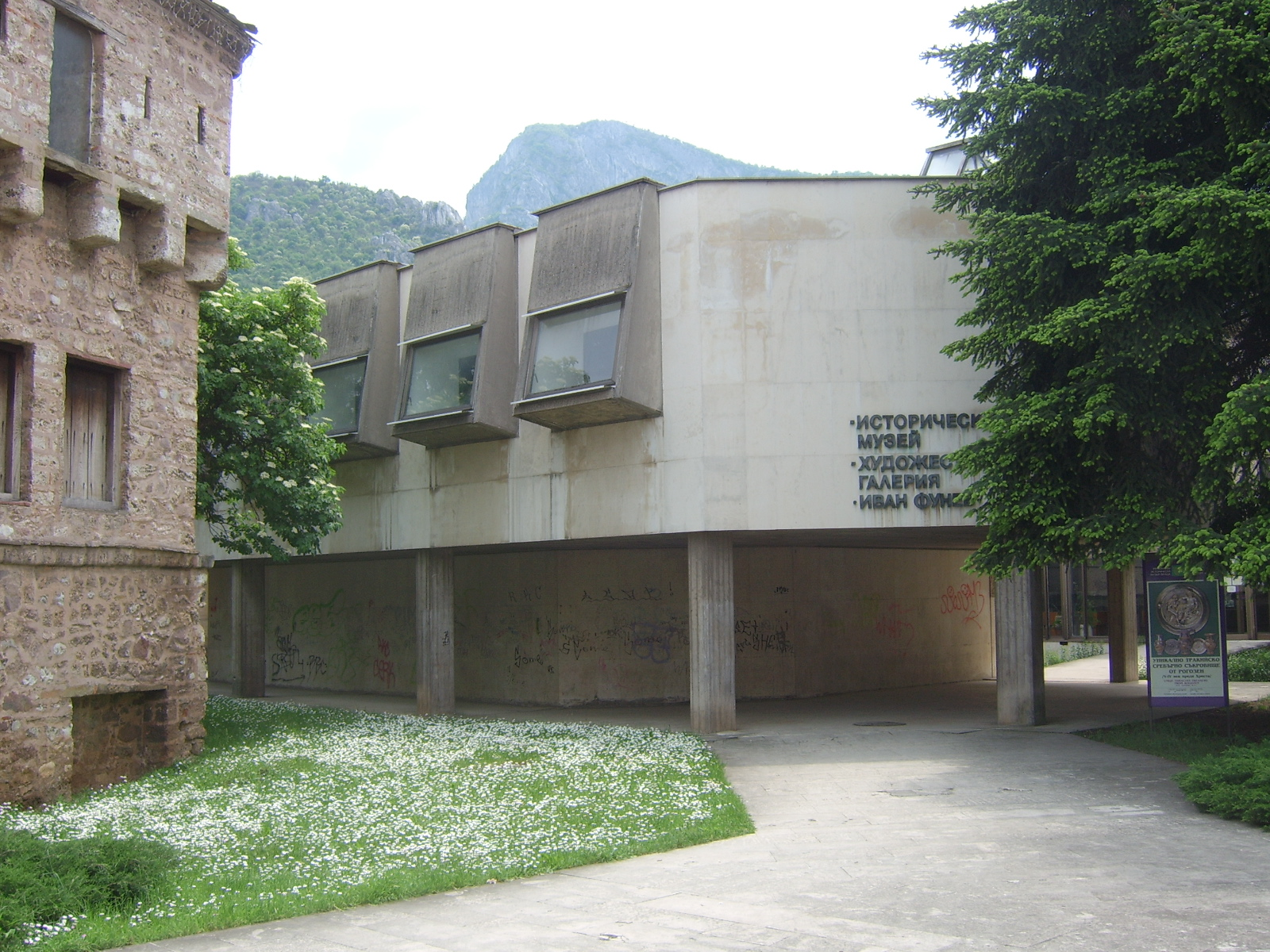
Regional historical museum in Vratsa

Regional historical museum in Vratsa preserves the Rogozen Treasure – the biggest Thracian treasure that was ever discovered on the territory of Bulgaria
The main building of the museum houses several exhibitions.

- Prehistory Hall
- Antiquity Hall
- The Middle Ages Hall
- The Thracian Treasures Hall
- The Rogozen Treasure Hall
- Hristo Botev exhibition Hall
- New History Hall
- Stone arc Hall
- Lapidarium.

== Panoramic views ==
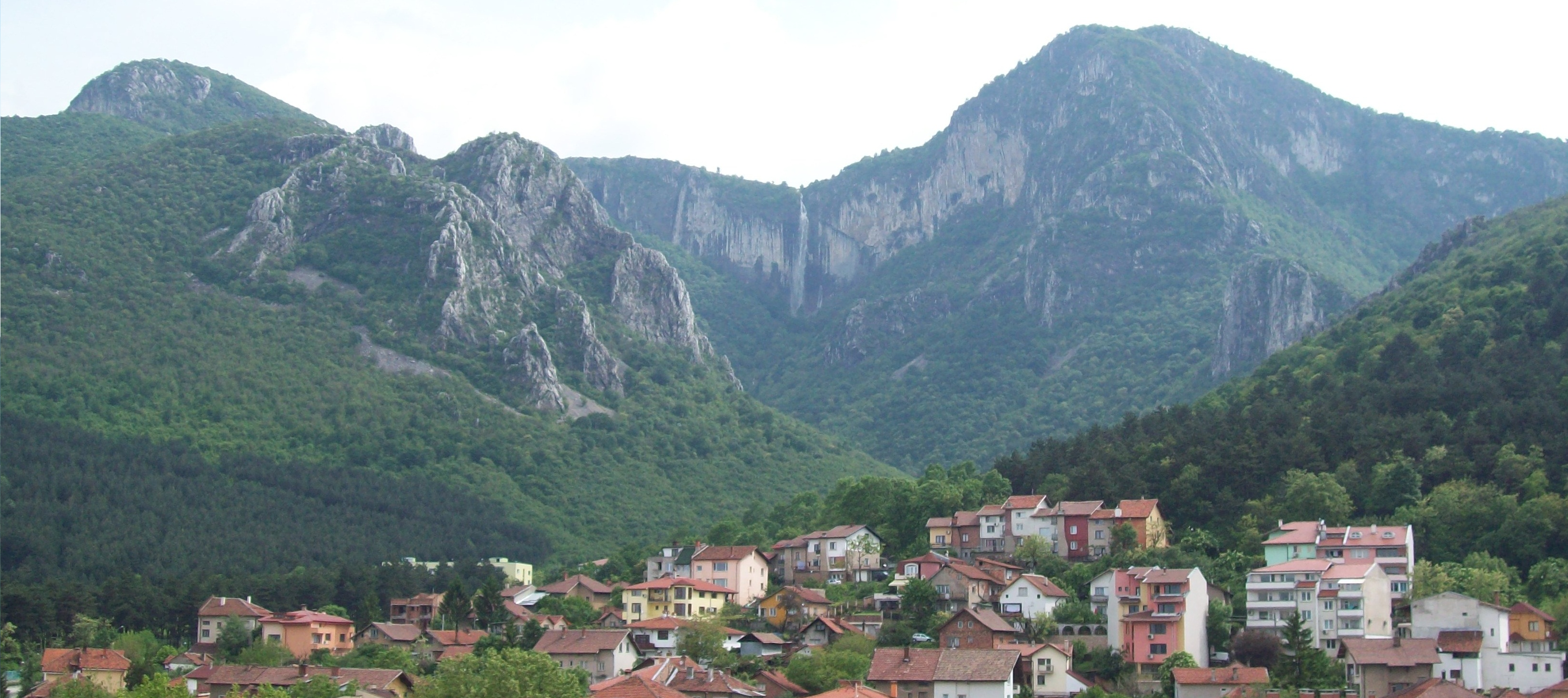

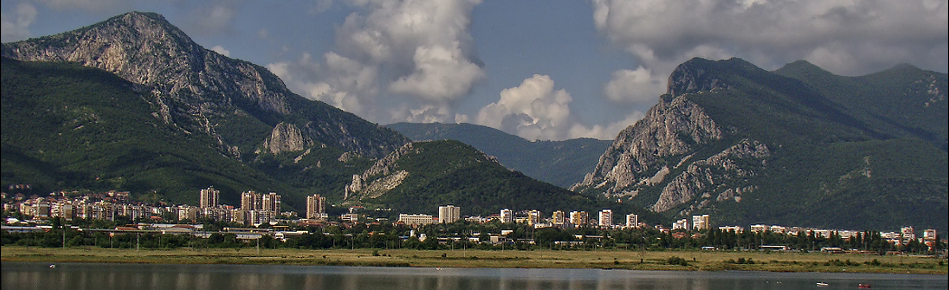

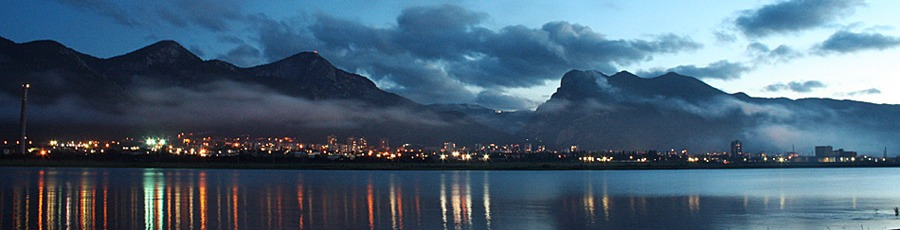

== Transport ==
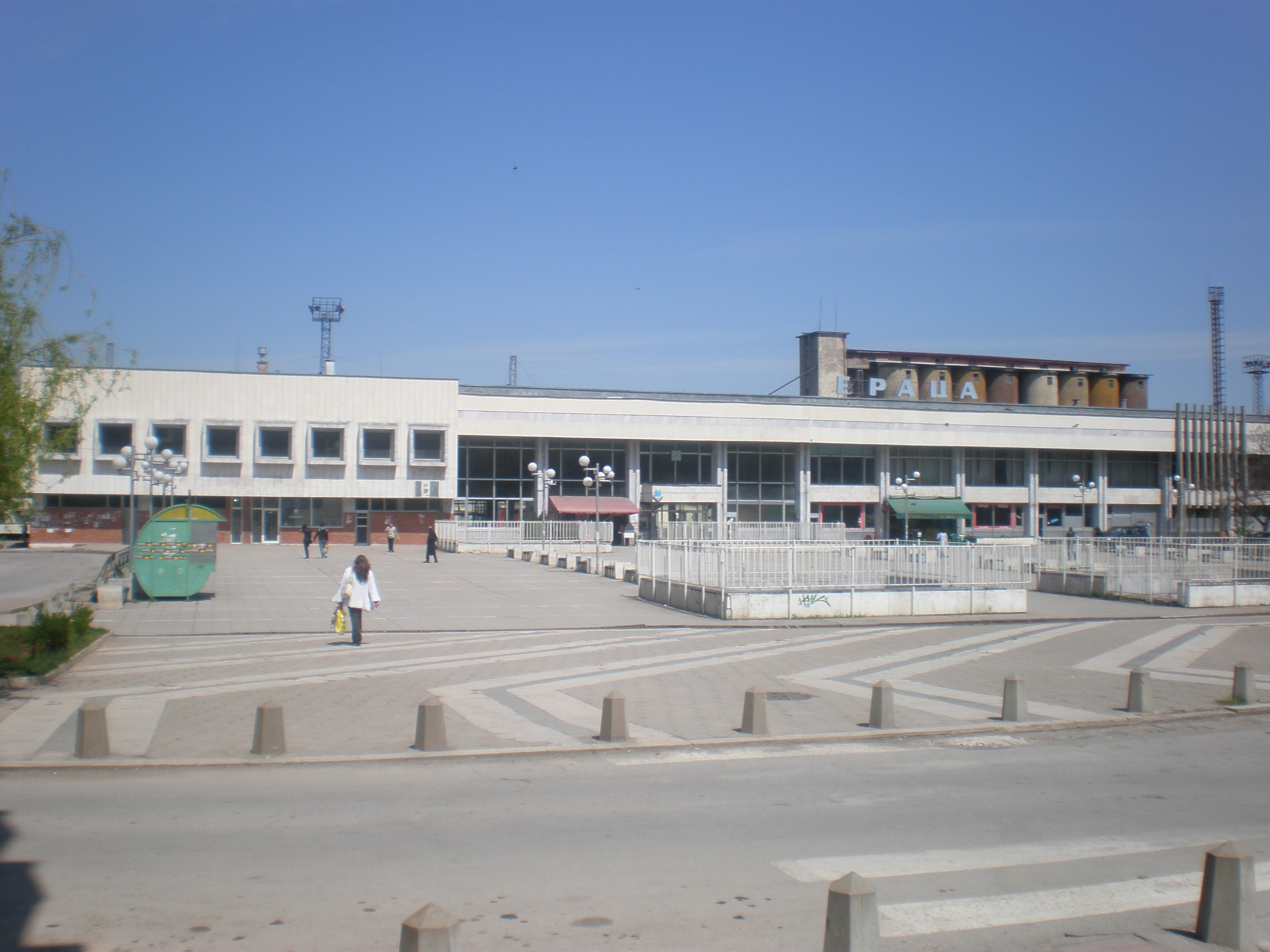
Rail Station Vratsa

The strategic location of Vratsa is determined by the major rail and road corridors. Its geographical position became even more important with the construction of the Danube Bridge 2 at the town of Vidin (providing the most direct land access from the Thessaloniki port and Sofia towards Western Europe). Vratsa connects to the villages and city within the region and throughout the country by bus and railway transport. There are regular bus lines to Sofia, Pleven, Vidin, Montana, Kozloduy, Oryahovo, Mezdra (at short intervals), as well as to the smaller villages, scattered around the city. The bus station is located on the way between the railway station and the centre of the city. Vratsa is an important railway station along the railway route Sofia — Vidin (Lom).

== Honour ==
Vratsa Peak on Greenwich Island in the South Shetland Islands, Antarctica is named after Vratsa.

== In popular culture ==
Vratsa is the home of a professional Quidditch team operating within the fictional Harry Potter universe. The Vratsa Vultures have won the European Cup seven times.

== Economy ==
=== Industry ===
In the area of Vratsa are developed many branches of industry: textile (production of cotton fabrics and silk), tailoring, food processing (bakery, confectionery, meat processing, dairy processing, soft drinks production, etc.) mining of rock lining materials from the Vratsa region – limestone), furniture, light, machine-building (production of lathes and mills), metal casting and metalworking, etc.

== Sport ==
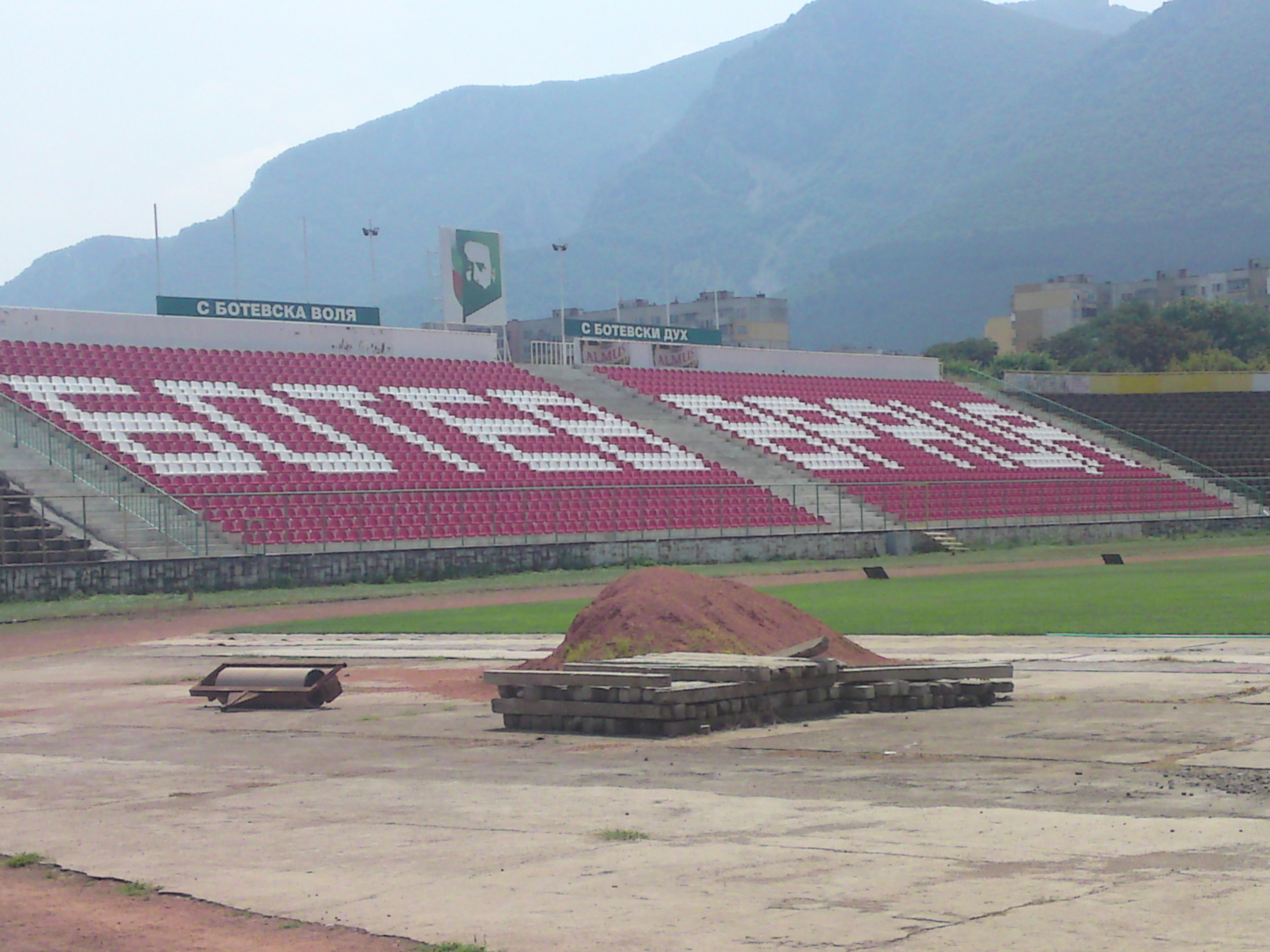
Botev Vratsa

- FC Botev Vratsa

== Twin towns – sister cities ==
Vratsa is twinned with:

- Bor, Serbia
- Craiova, Romania
- Kičevo, North Macedonia
- Kobryn, Belarus
- Serpukhov, Russia
- Sumy, Ukraine
- Villeneuve-le-Roi, France

== Gallery ==
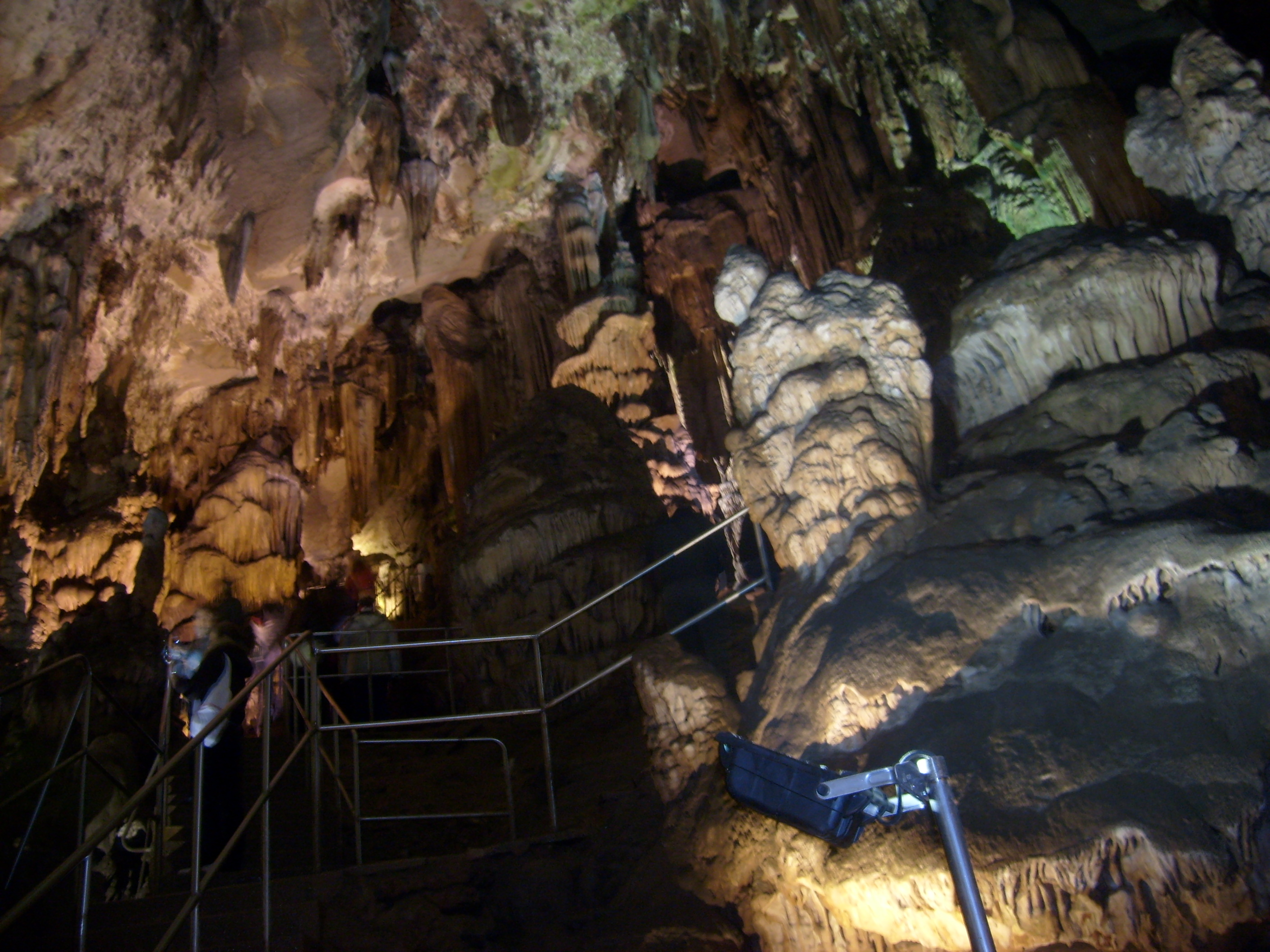
Ledenika cave

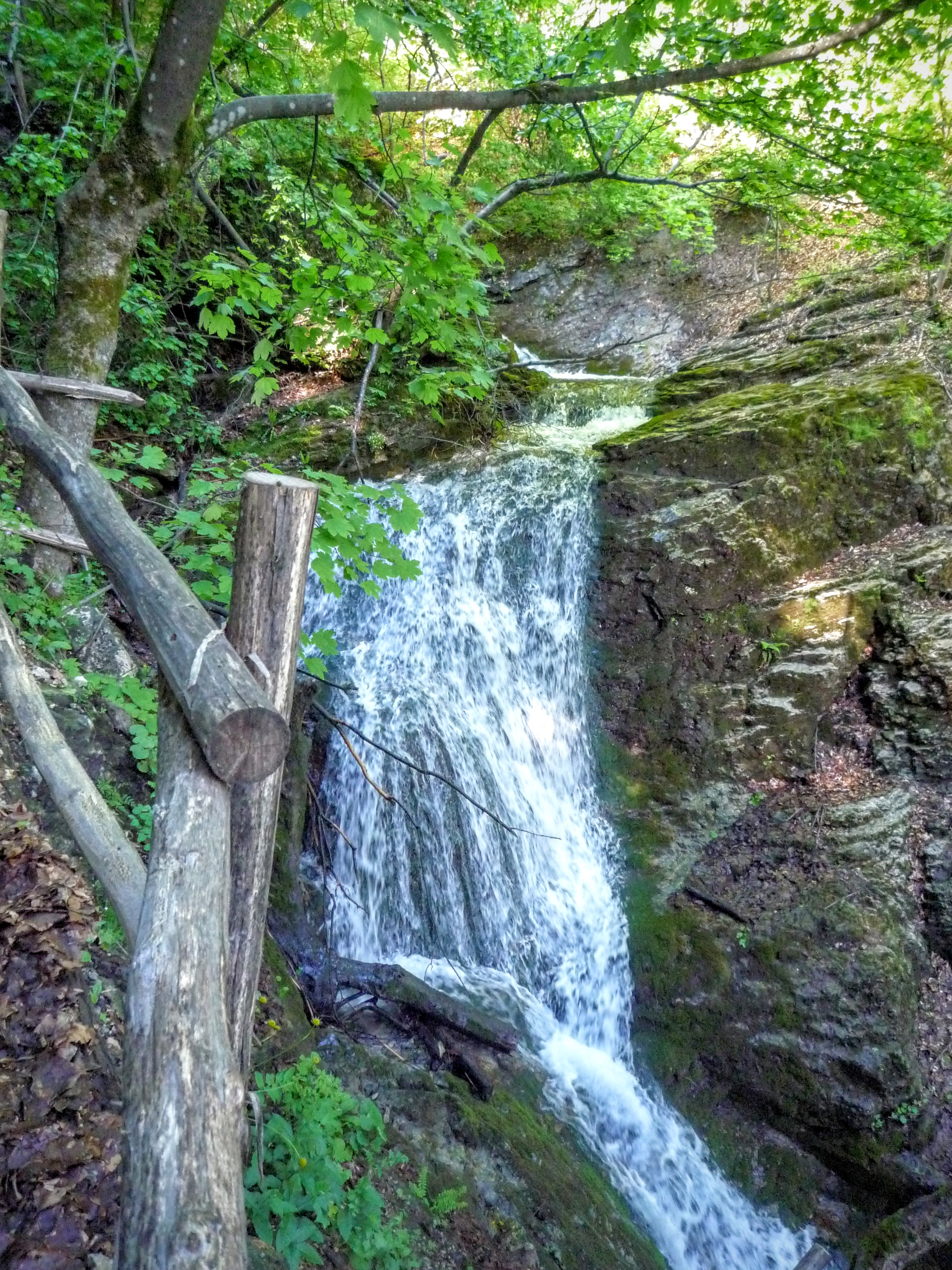
Borov Kamak waterfall

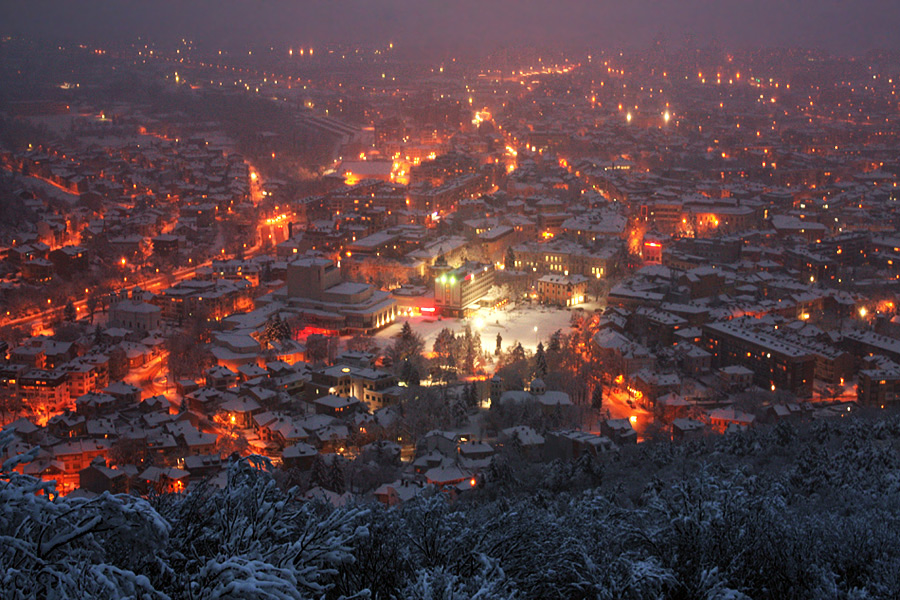
Vratsa by night

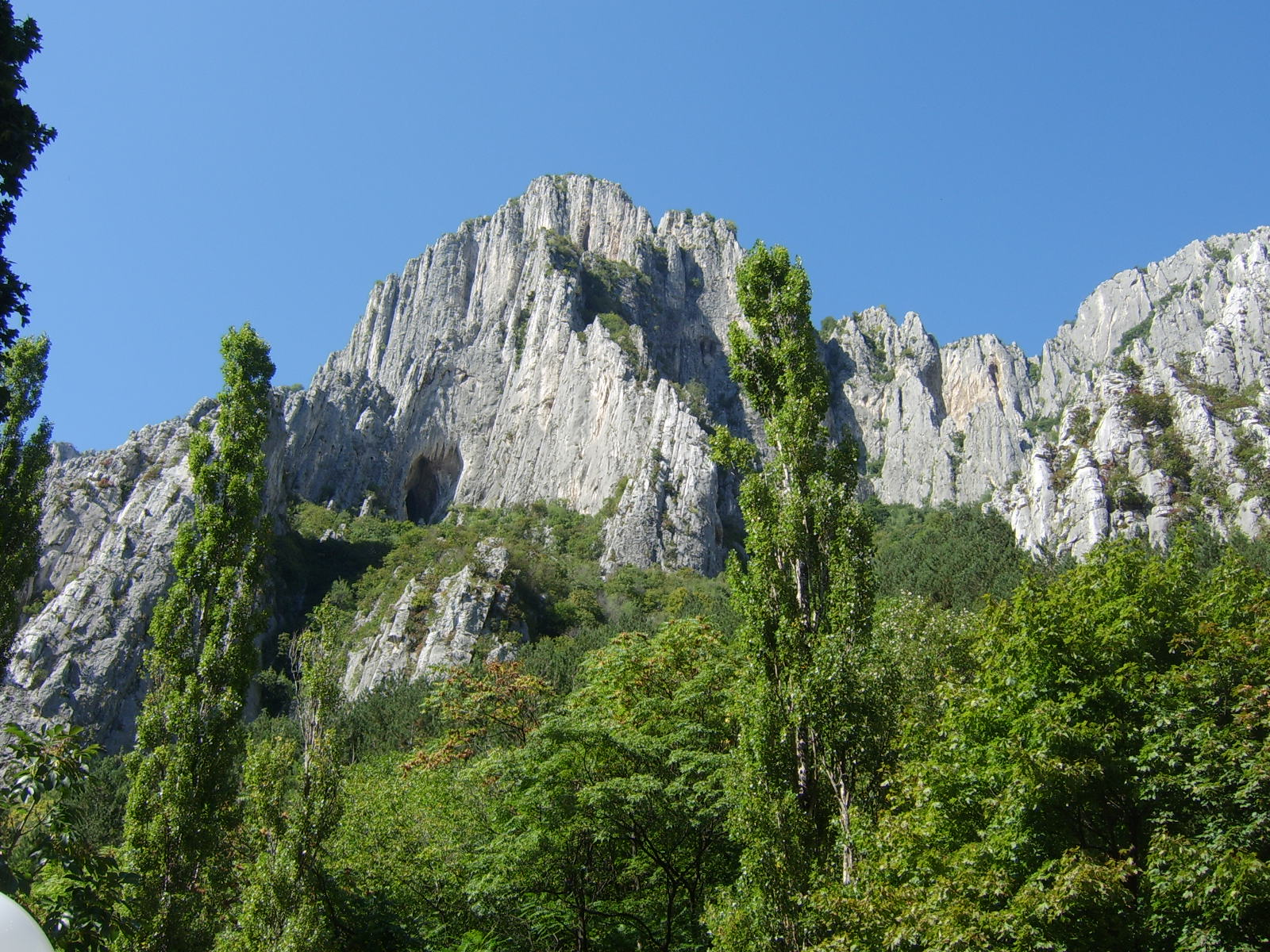
Vratsata gorge

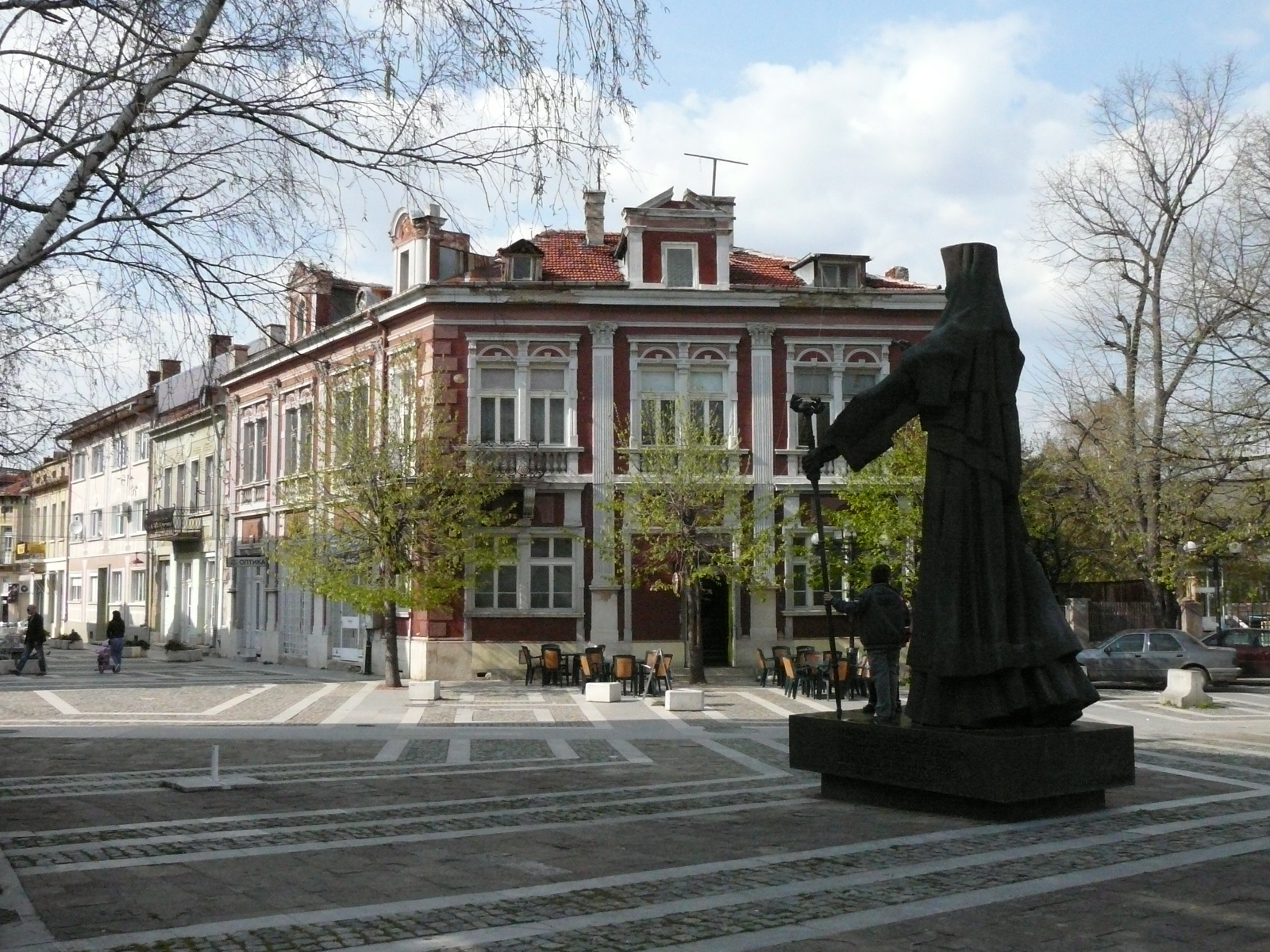
Street scene

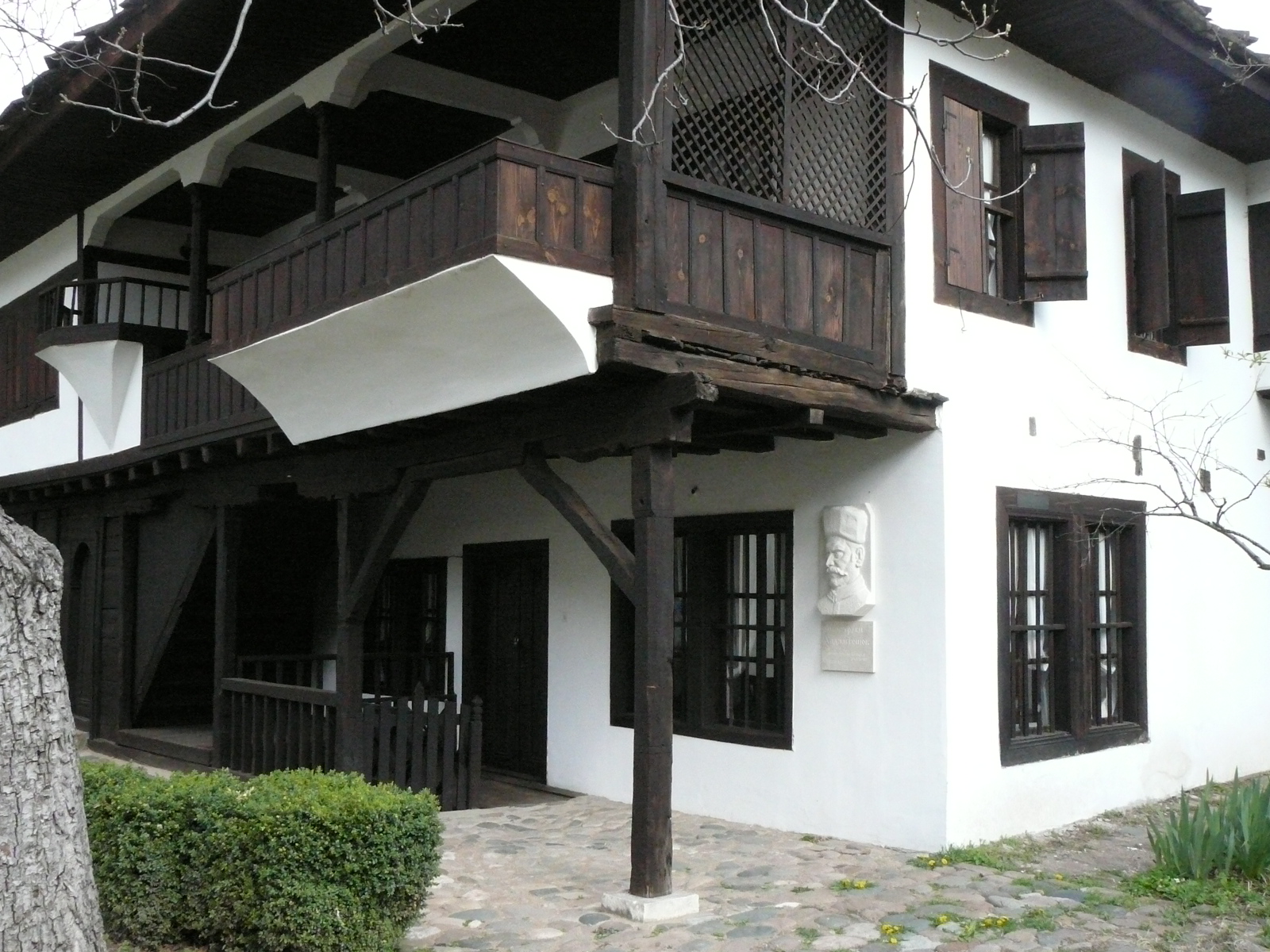
Ethnographic complex

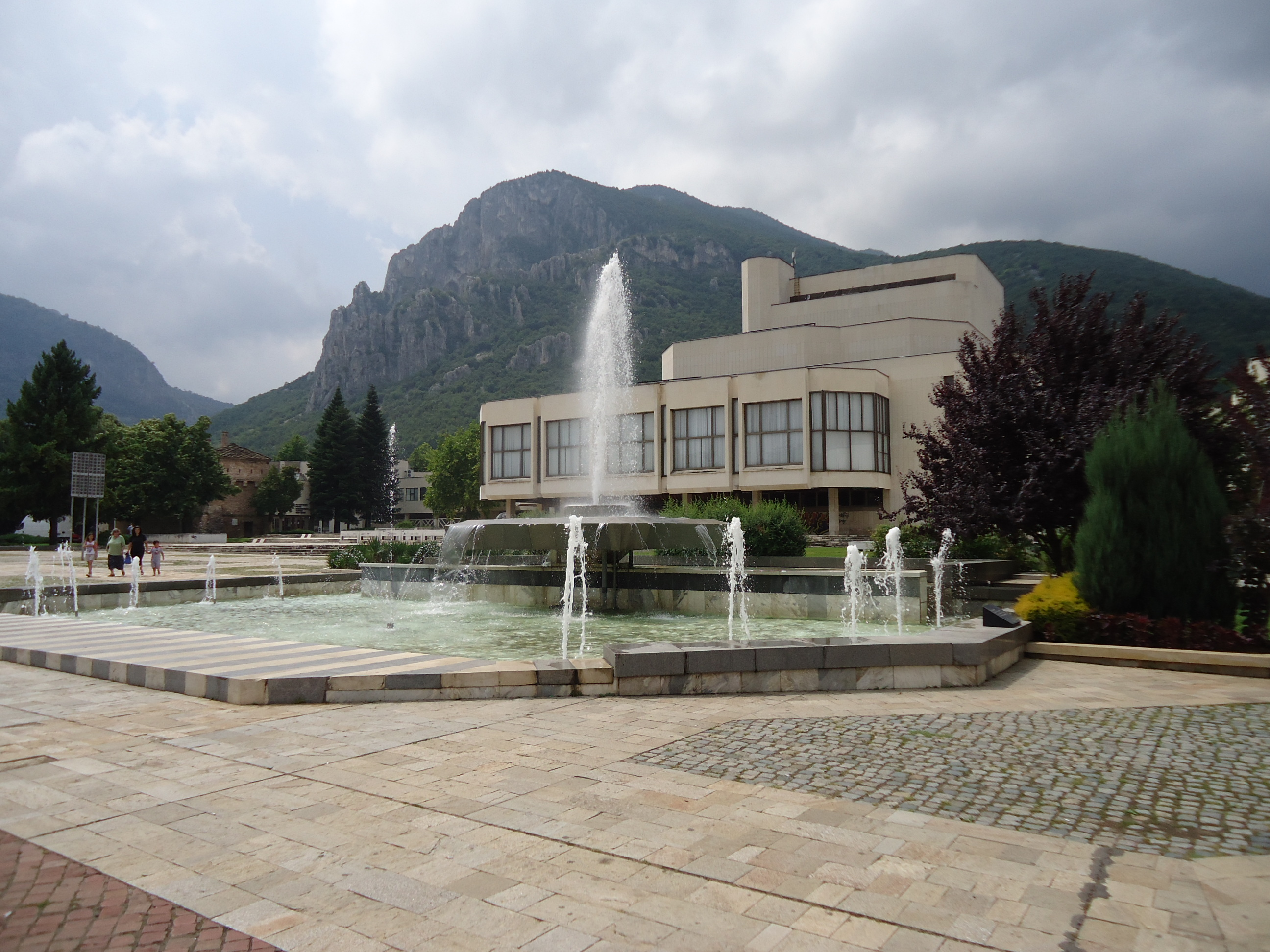
Theatre

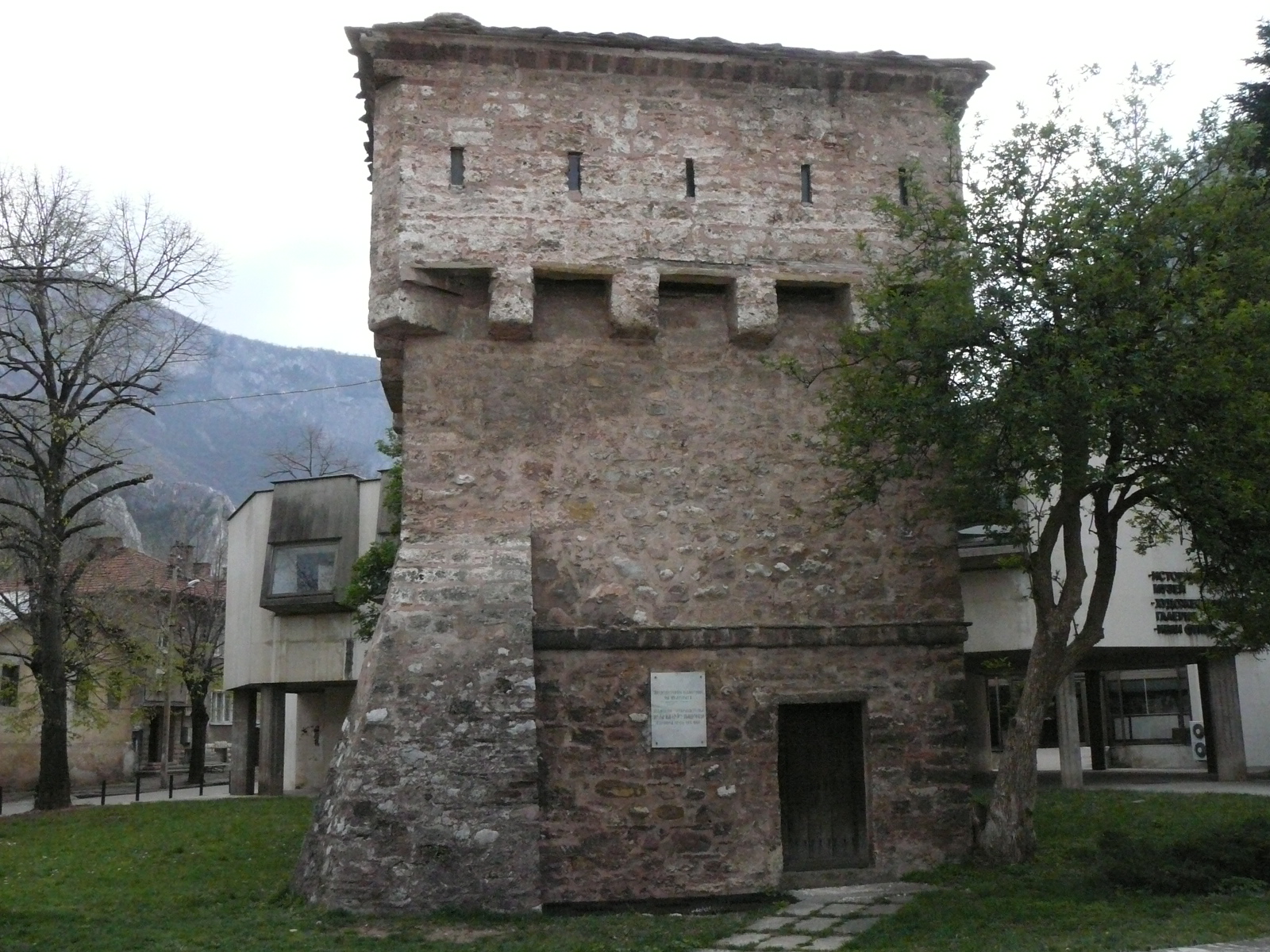
Medieval Tower of Kurt Pasha

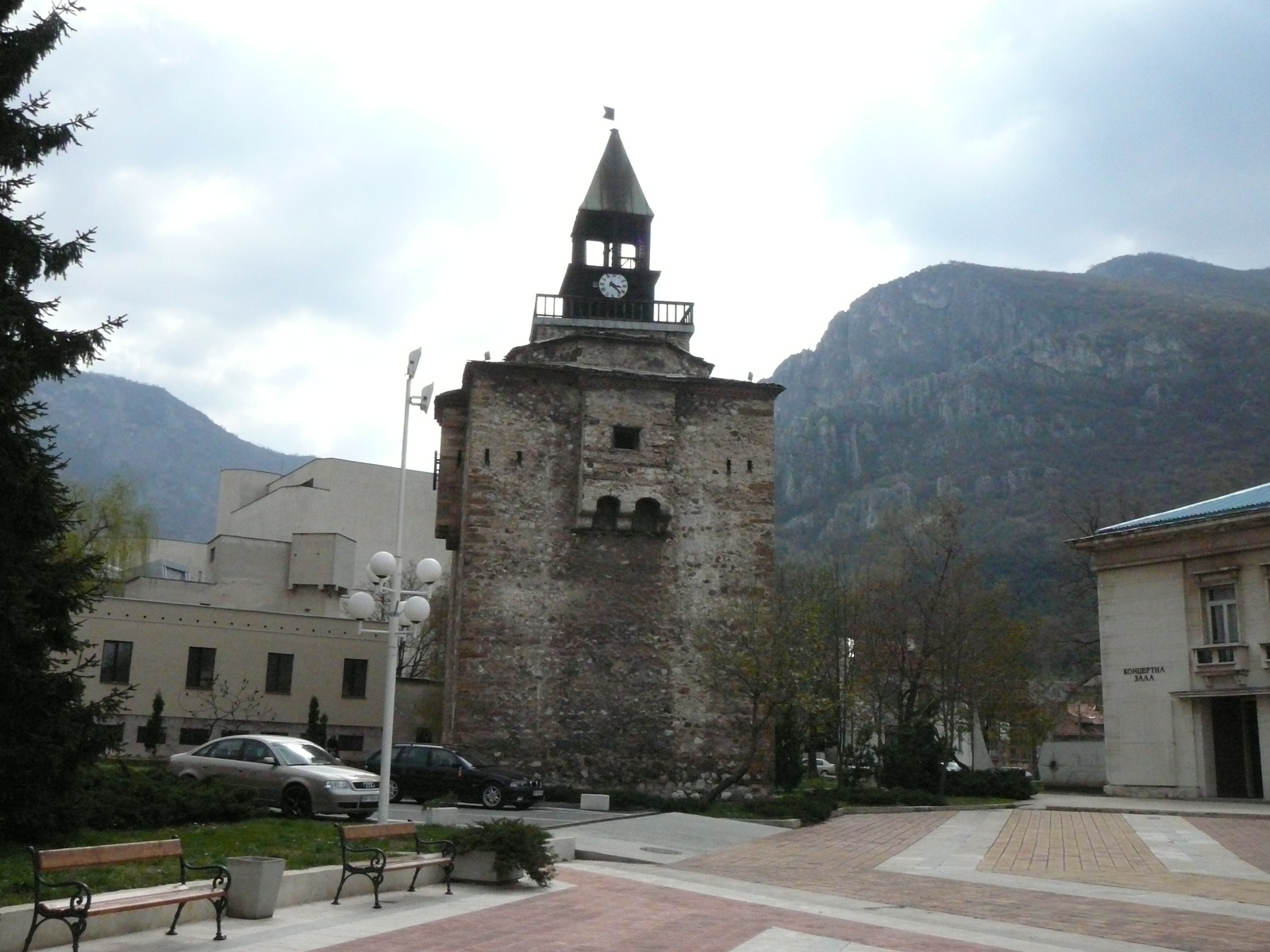
Medieval tower

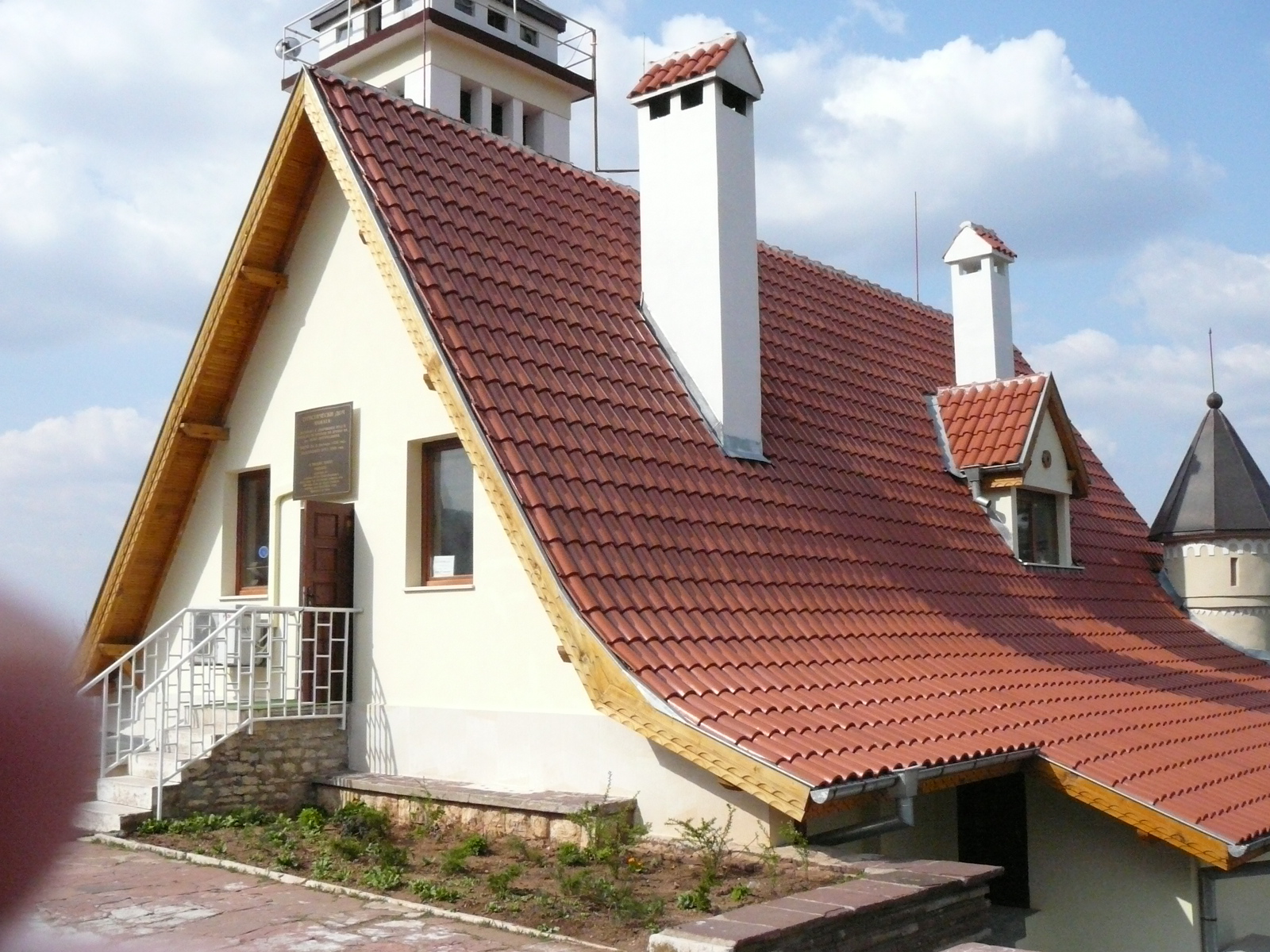
Tourist centre

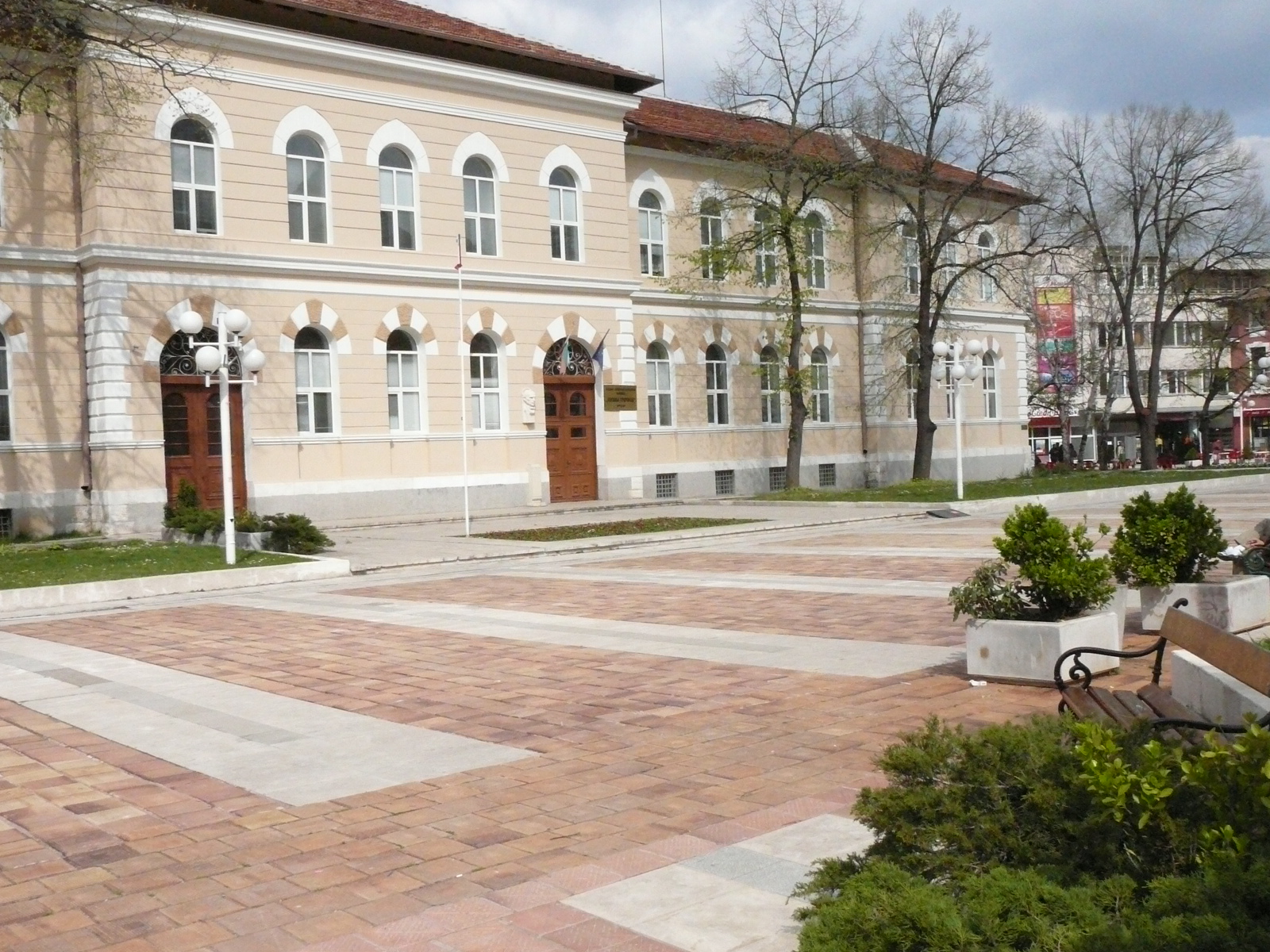
School

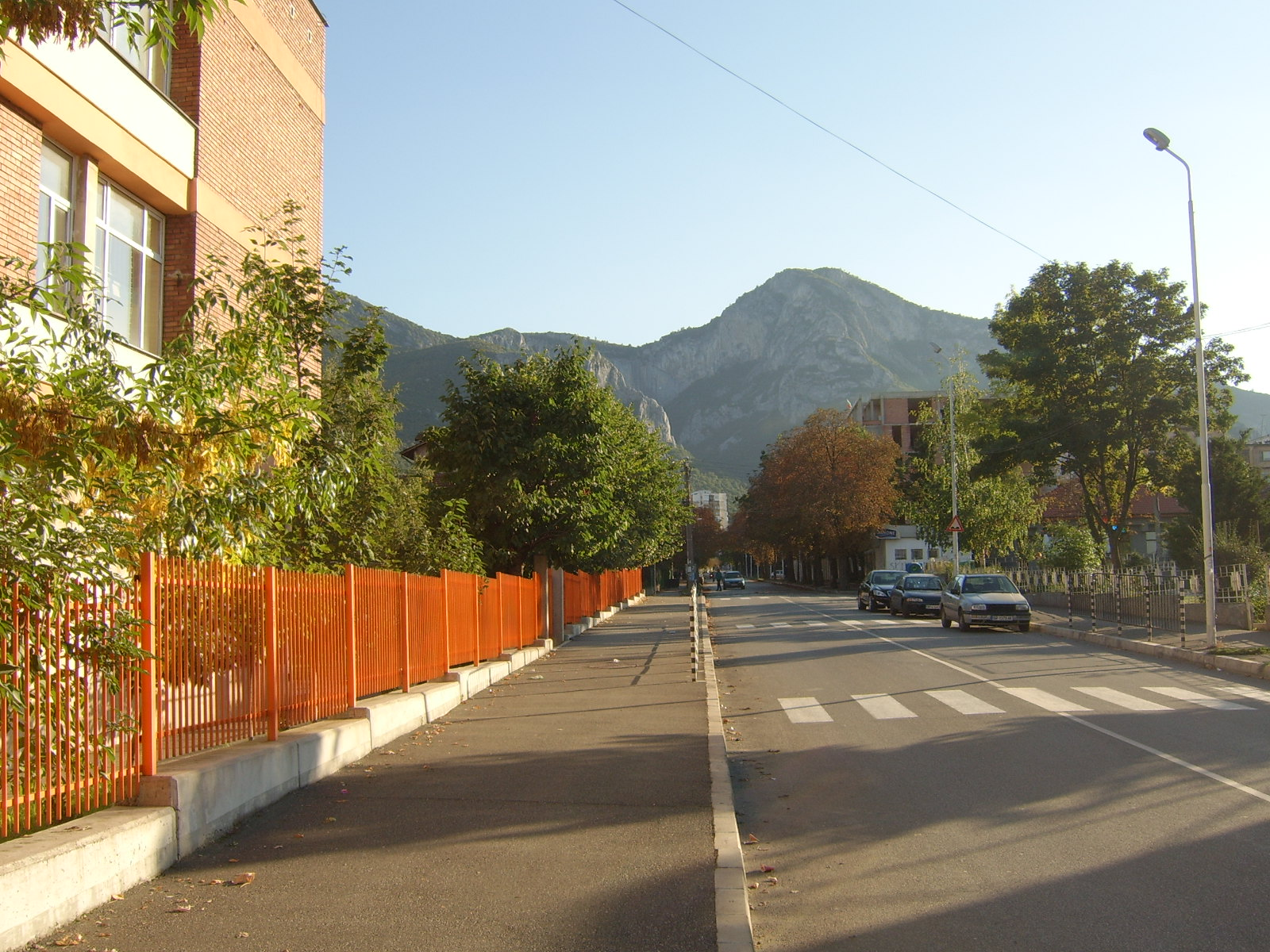
Street in Vratsa

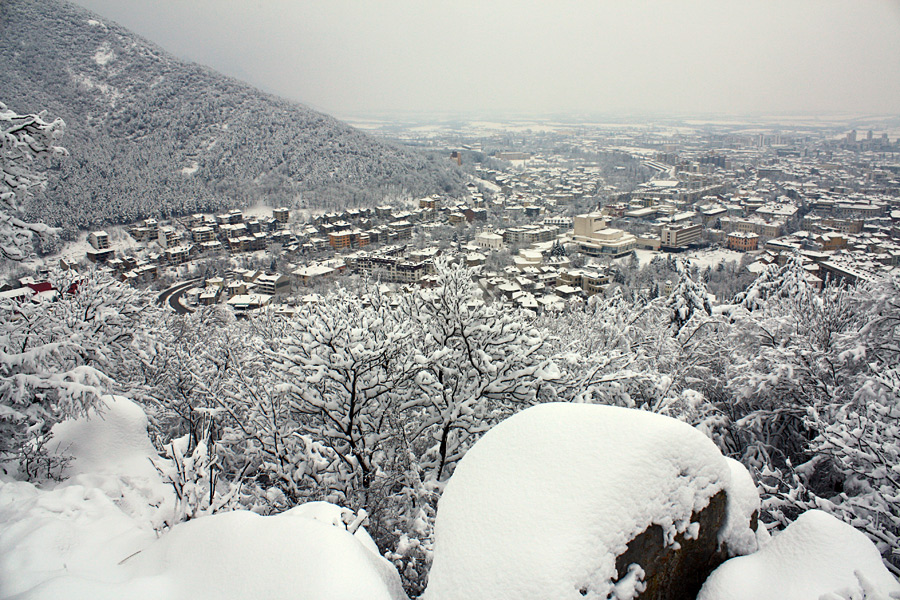
Vratsa in the winter
