= Banat Bulgarian =

Banat Bulgarian may refer to:

- Banat Bulgarian dialect
- Banat Bulgarians
