= Bardarski Geran =

Bardarski Geran Bardársći Gjeránj
- Village
- Бърдарски геран
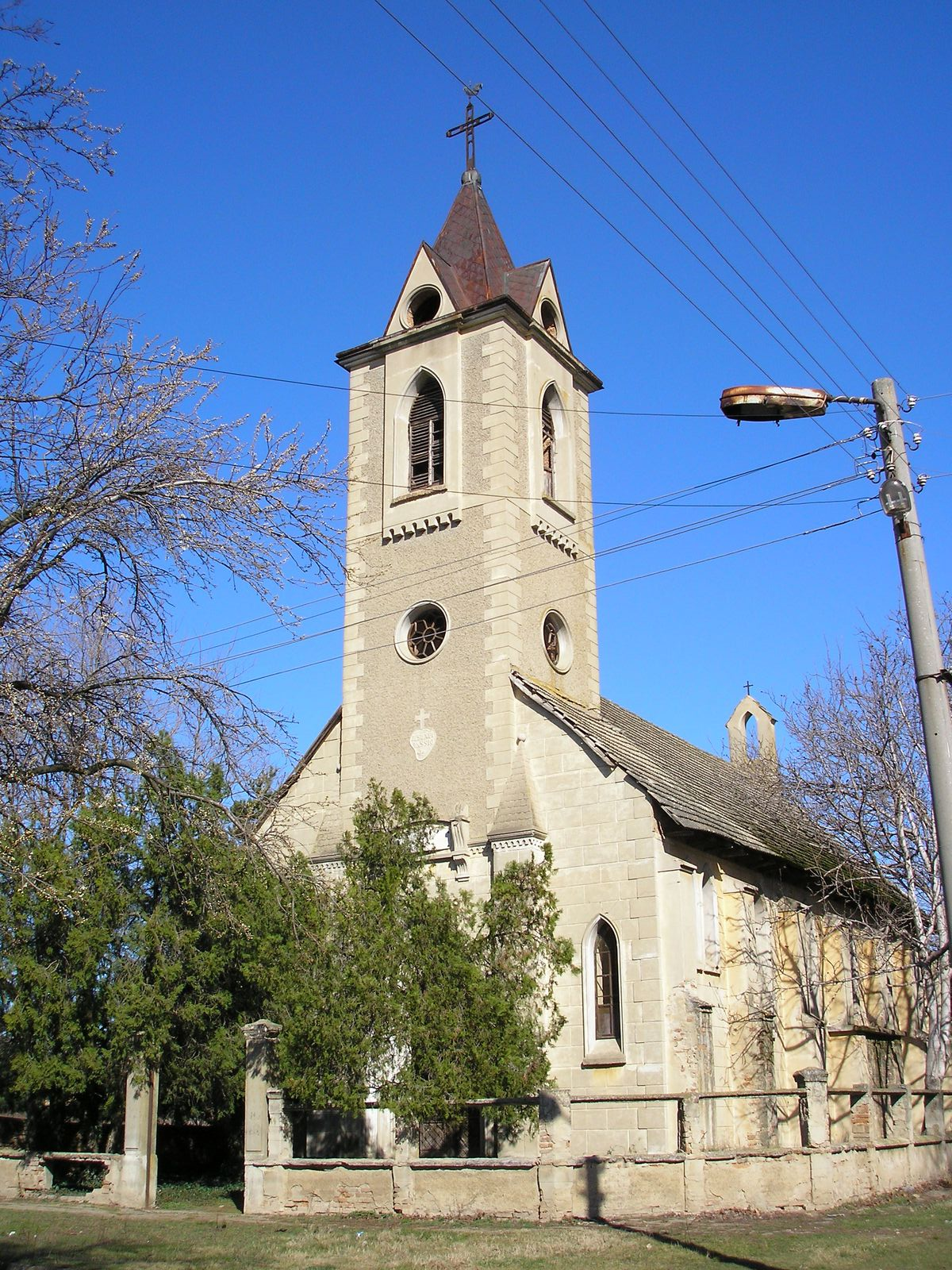
- German Church in Bardarski Geran

- Location of Bardarski Geran
- Coordinates: 43°32′57″N 23°57′08″E
- Country: Bulgaria
- Province (Oblast): Vratsa
- Municipality (Obshtina): Byala Slatina
- First settled: 1887

Government
  - Mayor: Tatyana Sofranova

Area
  - Land: 28.033 km^{2} (10.824 sq mi)
- Elevation: 159 m (522 ft)

Population (2020)
  - Total: 633
- Time zone: UTC+2 (EET)
  - Summer (DST): UTC+3 (EEST)
- Postal Code: 3259

Bardarski Geran (Bulgarian: Бърдарски геран; Banat Bulgarian: Bardársći Gjeránj or Bardáre) is a village in northwestern Bulgaria, part of Byala Slatina Municipality, Vratsa Province. It is among the several villages founded by Banat Bulgarians returning from the Banat after the Liberation of Bulgaria from Ottoman rule in 1878, and is thus predominantly Roman Catholic. It is regarded as "the capital of Banat Bulgarians in Bulgaria" by certain members of the community.

== Geography ==
The village of Bardarski Geran is located in the western part of the Danube plain, near its most fertile field Zlatiyata, known in the past as the granary of Western Bulgaria.

The climate is temperate continental with pronounced temperature amplitudes. Spring is cool, summer - dry and hot, winter - cold.

== History and culture ==
The village was founded in 1887, mostly by Banat Bulgarian settlers (initially 185 families) from Dudeștii Vechi (Stár Bišnov) in Austria-Hungary (today in Romania). A number of Banat Swabians also settled, beginning with seven families in 1893, their total number later exceeding 90 families. Due to the religious differences (the Bulgarian inhabitants of the surrounding villages being Eastern Orthodox), the inhabitants of Bardarski Geran would mostly communicate with residents of the other Catholic villages in the region.

The village has two Roman Catholic churches, one of which is the Church of St Joseph, and the other the German Church of the Virgin Mary, which was almost destroyed due to lack of maintenance, as the bulk of the Germans left around World War II. A foundation has been working on the reconstruction since May 2021. Despite the common denomination, lifestyle and customs, the Bulgarians and the Germans would not usually intermarry and often quarrelled, and so preferred to have two separate churches. In the 1930s, the Bulgarian parish priest was Evgeniy Bosilkov, future Bishop of Nikopol, while the German colonists were served by Emil Frohe.

Bardarski Geran's characteristic architecture featuring elongated one-storey houses with Central European-style sharp-pointed roofs and straight streets owes much to Italian architect and engineer Leopold Forabosco who settled in the village after arriving in Bulgaria on Tsar Ferdinand's request.

The monthly newspaper of the Banat Bulgarians in Bulgaria, Falmis, was founded in Bardarski Geran in 1997. There is also a folklore dance group active in Bardarski Geran and performing Banat Bulgarian dances and songs. The Bardarski Geran cultural centre (chitalishte) was founded in 1923 by Germans and Bulgarians in the house of Mathis Scheringer; in 1958, it moved to its present building. The village has an amateur football club, named after Botev. In the village's centre, right next to the clock tower, there is a monument to a Soviet fighter plane crew that crashed in the vicinity in World War II, as well as a monument to the locals that perished in the Balkan Wars and World War I.

== Gallery ==
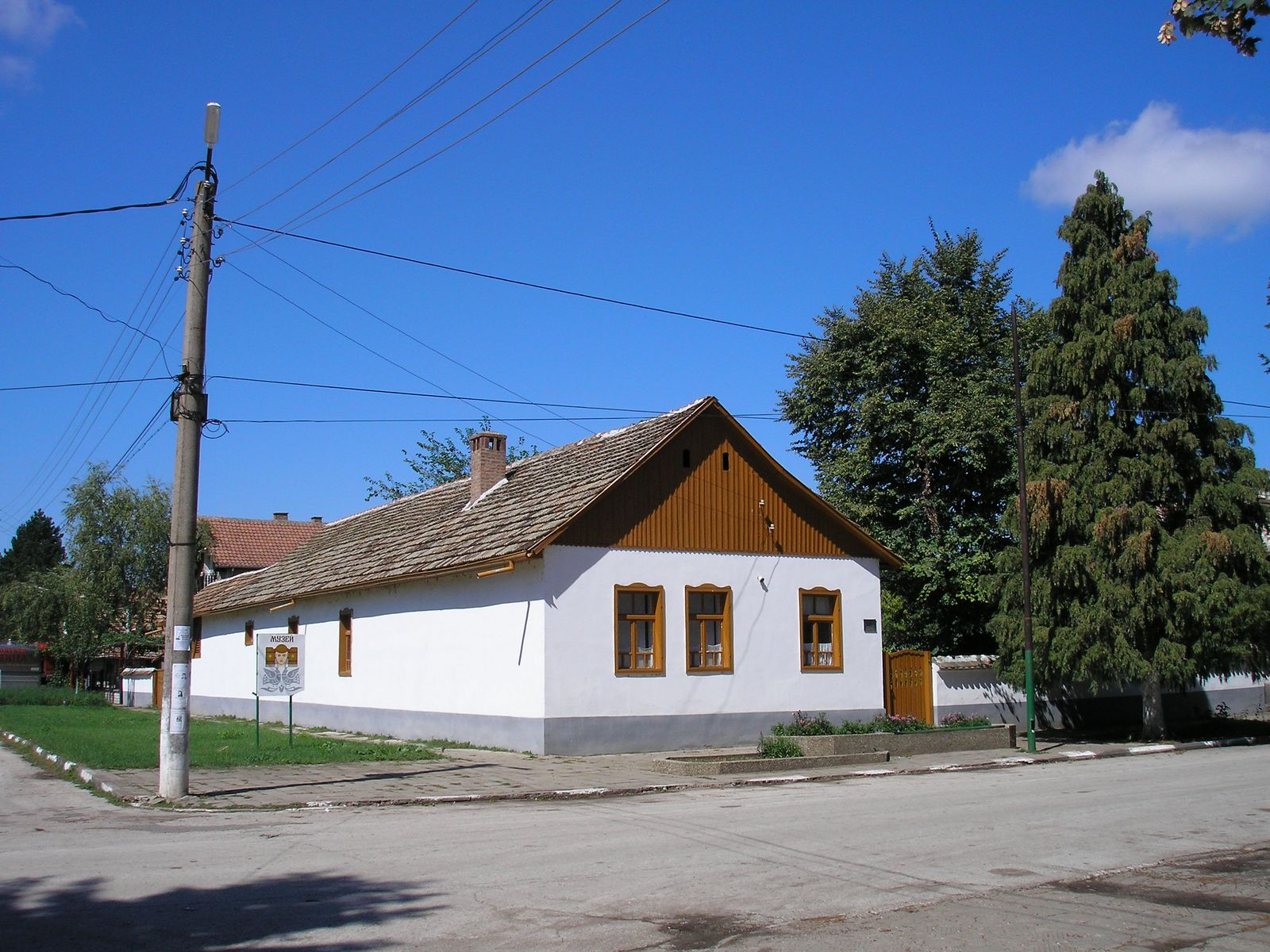
Museum

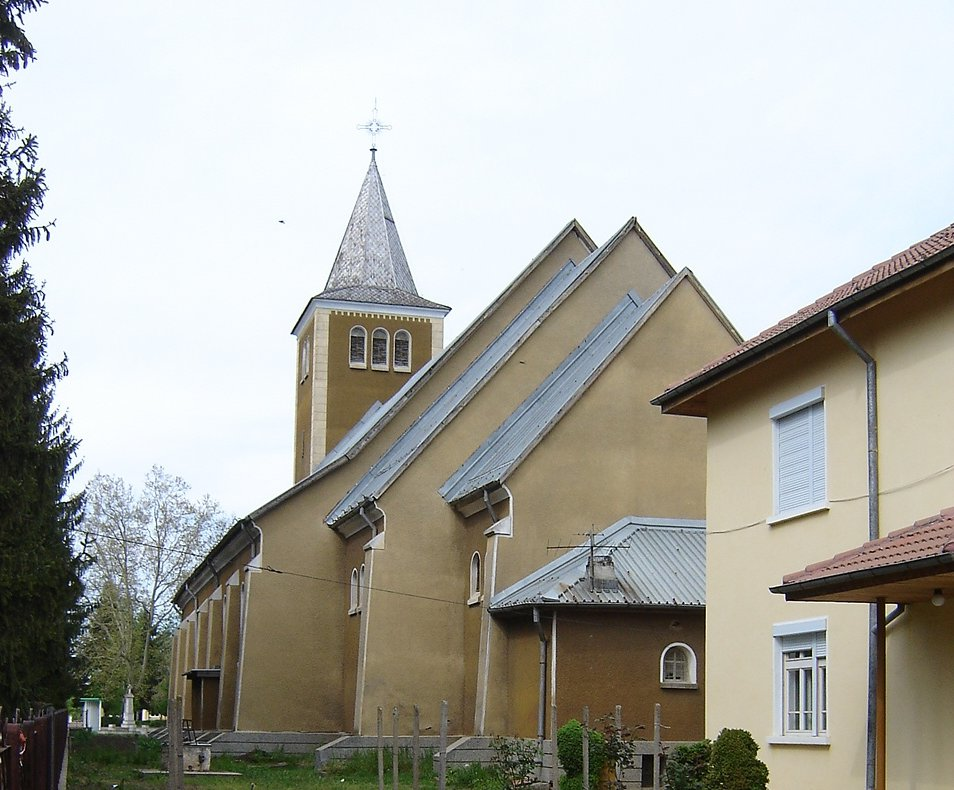
Banat Bulgarian church

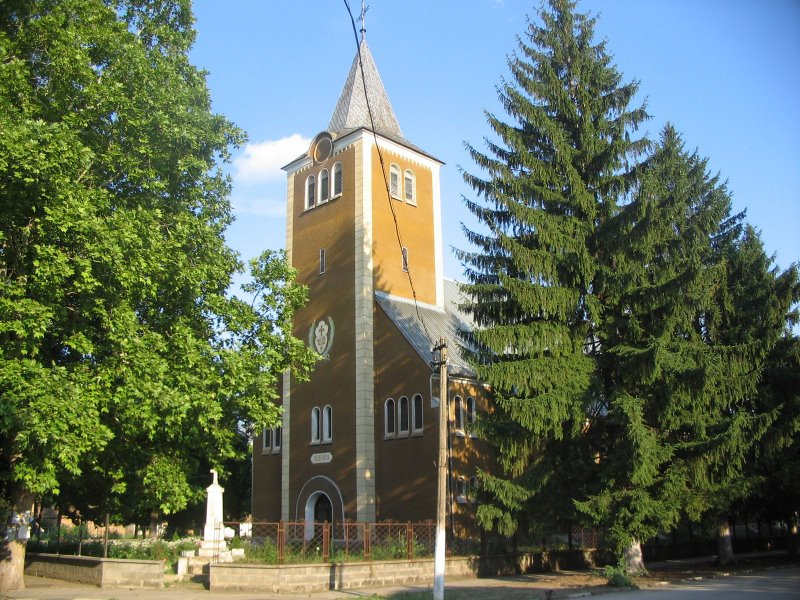
Banat Bulgarian church

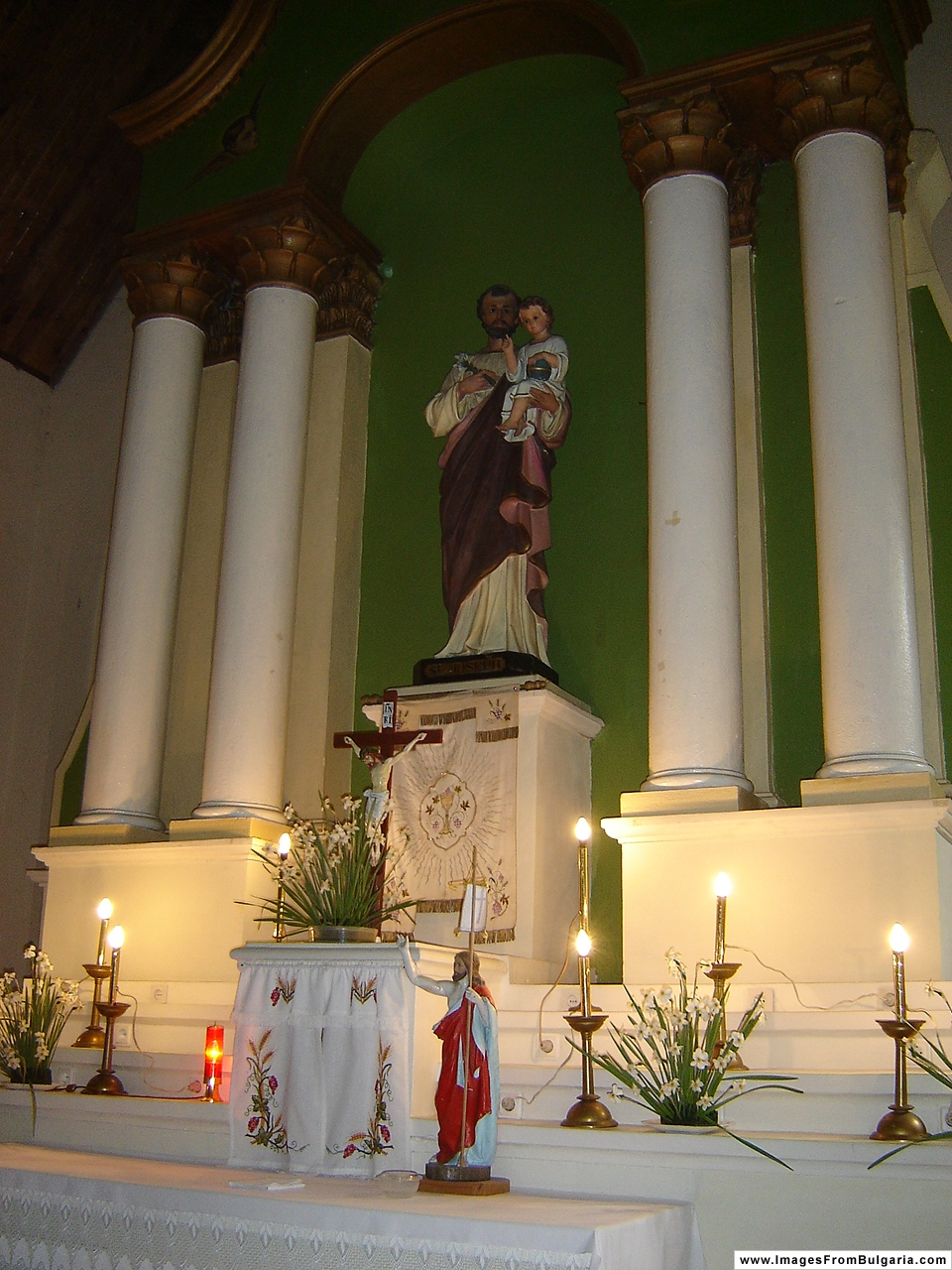
Inside the Banat Bulgarian church

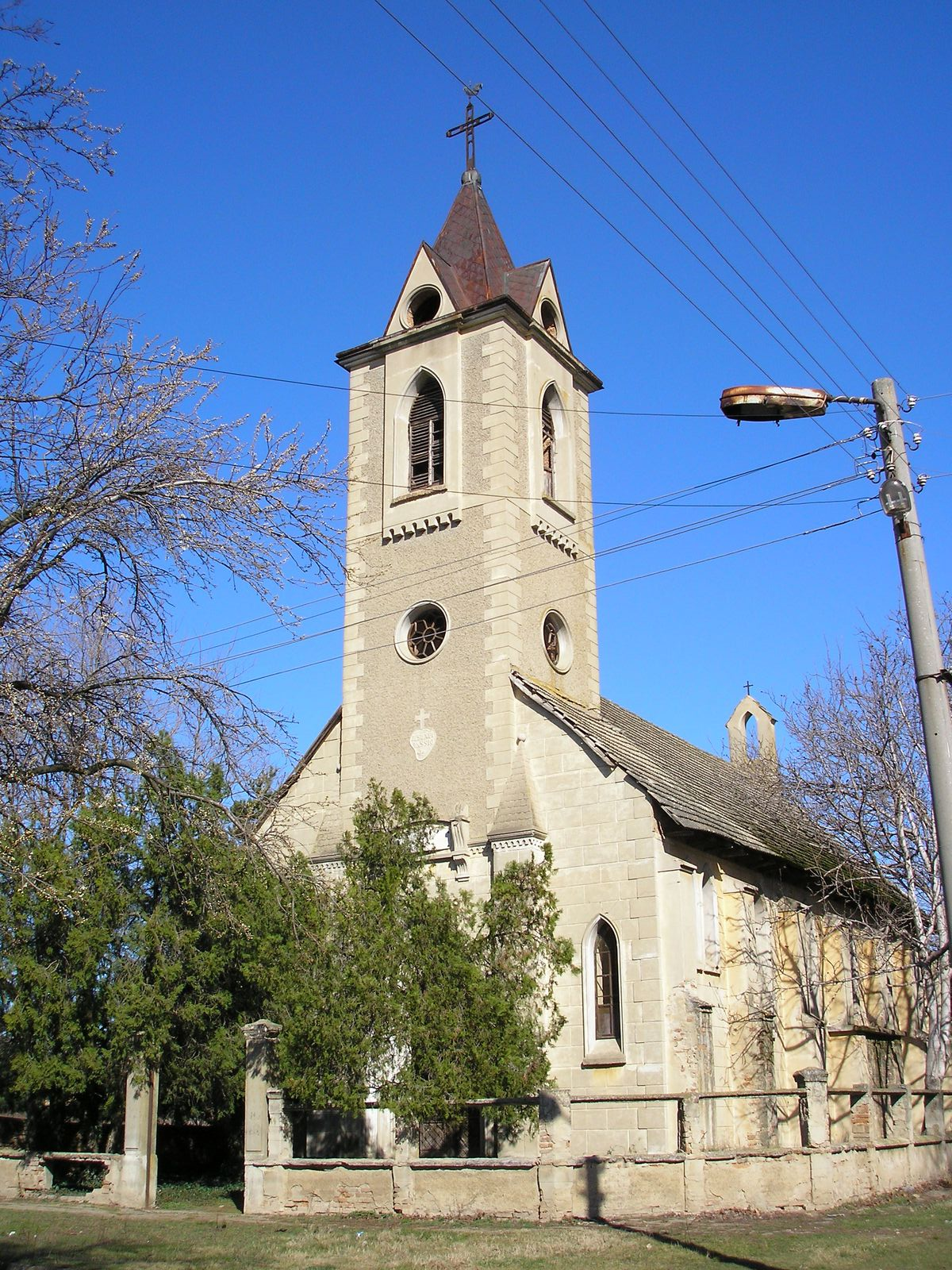
German church

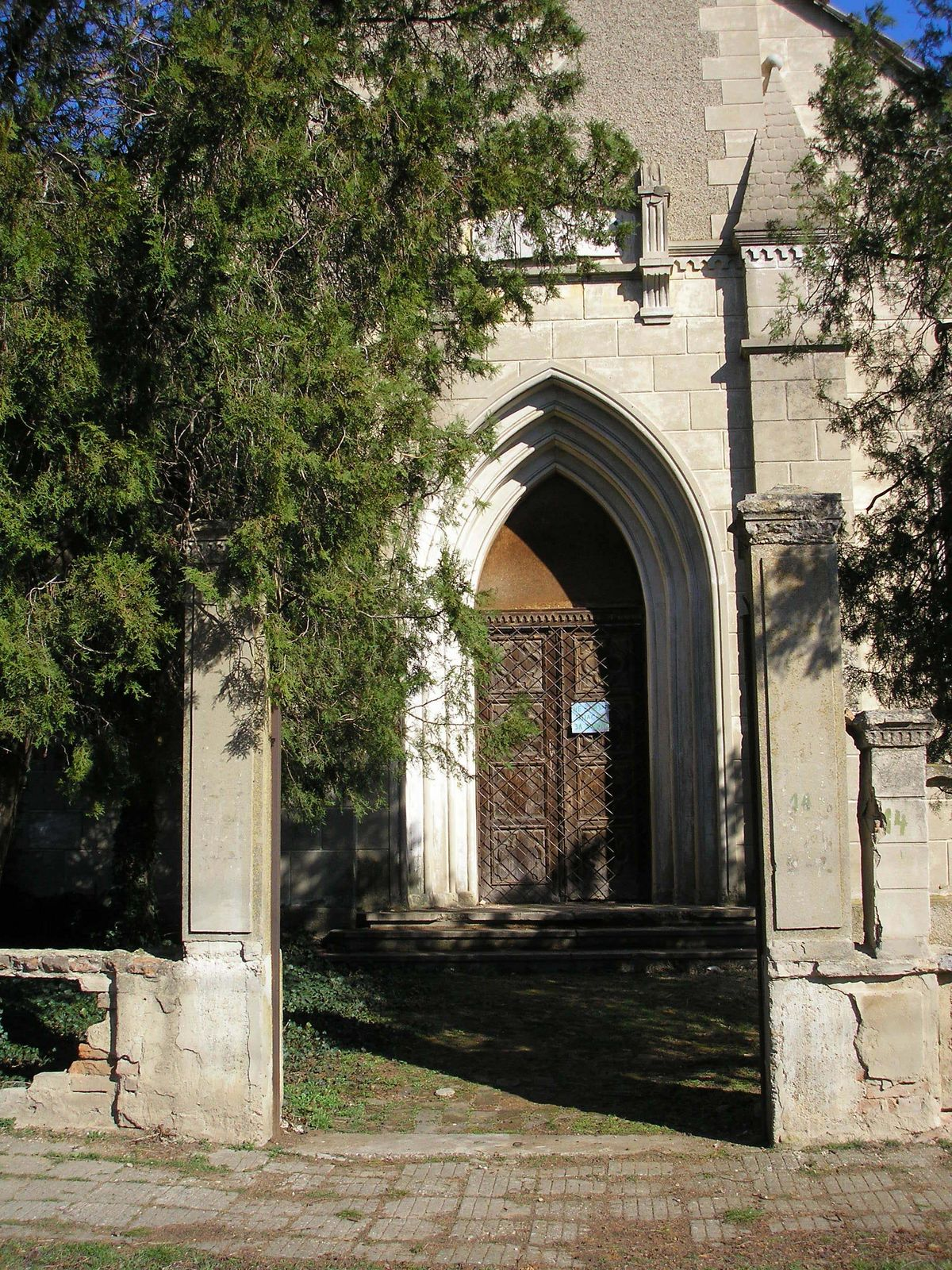
German church

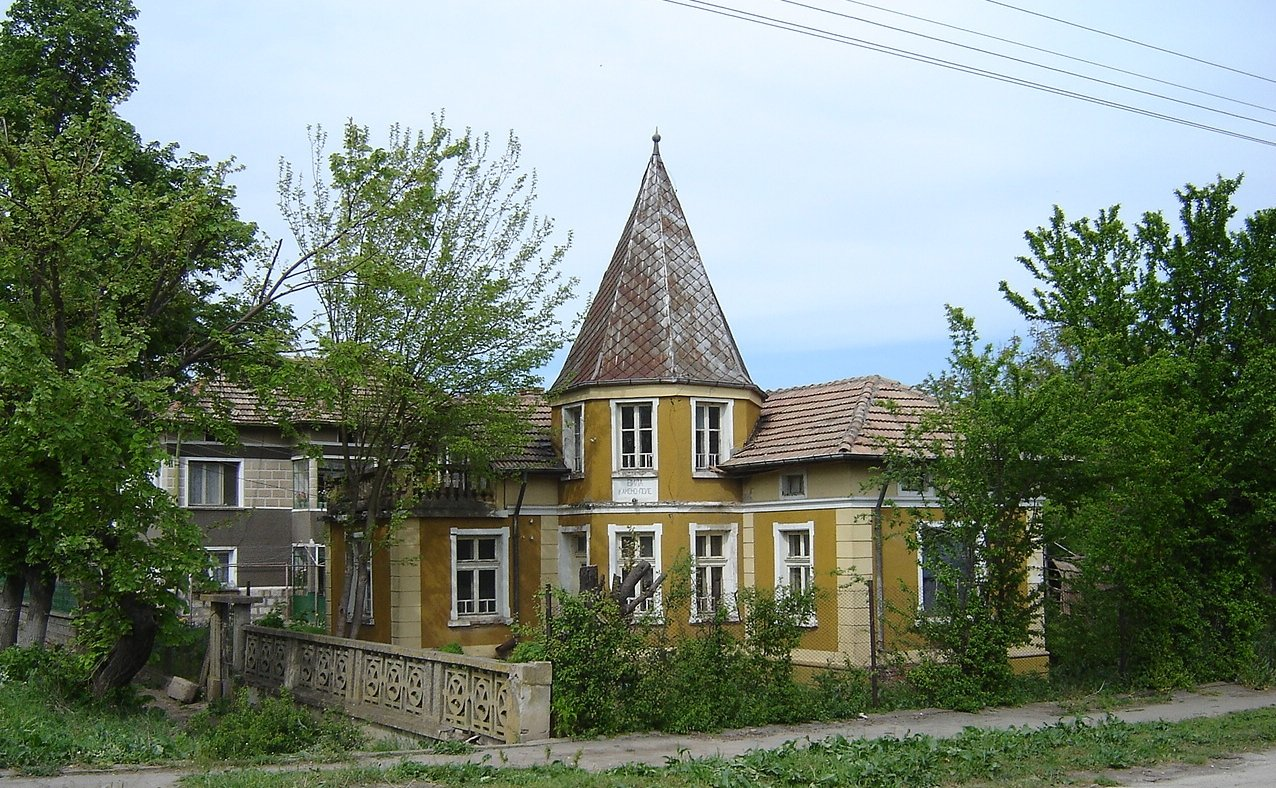
Old house

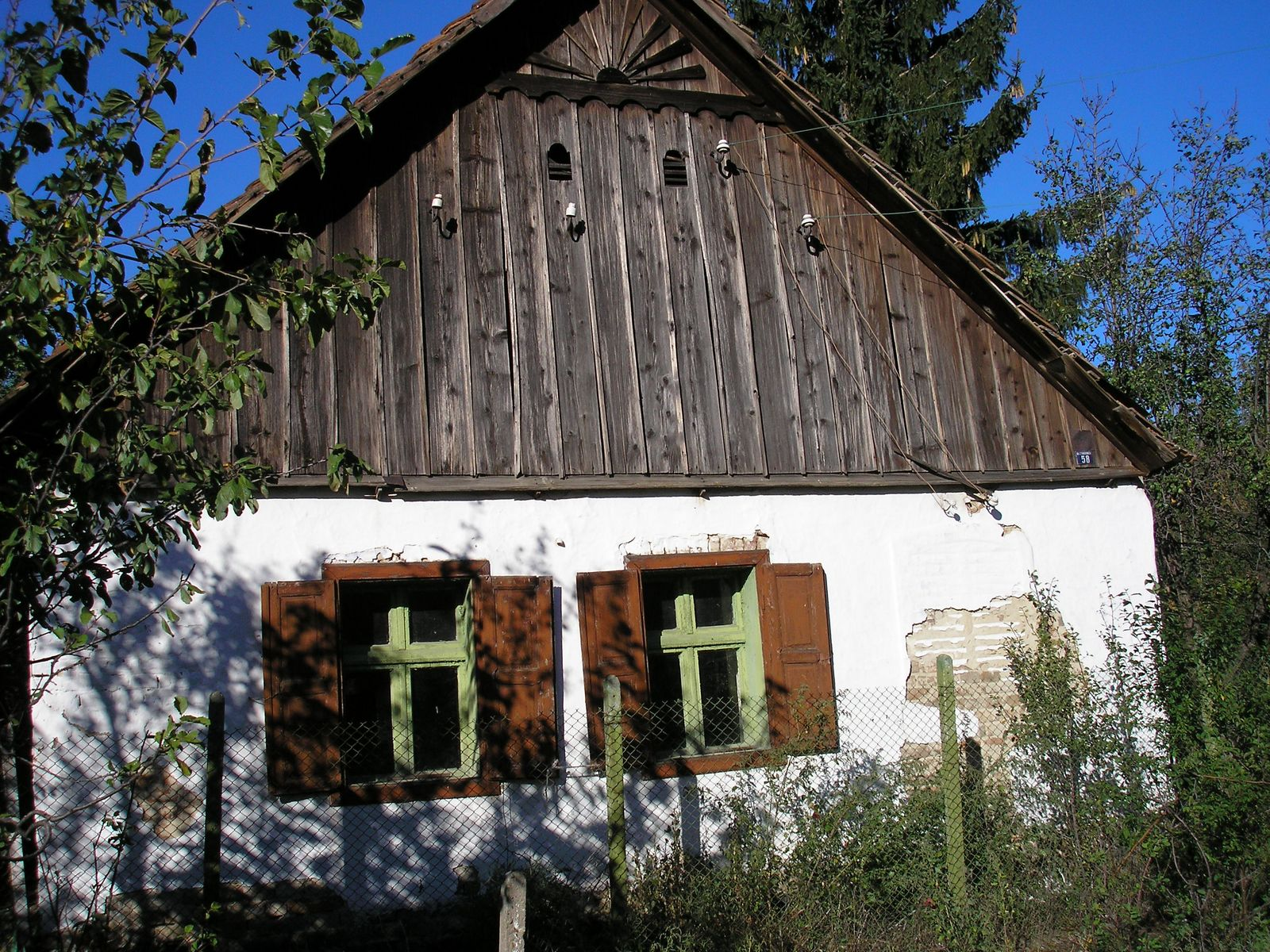
Old house

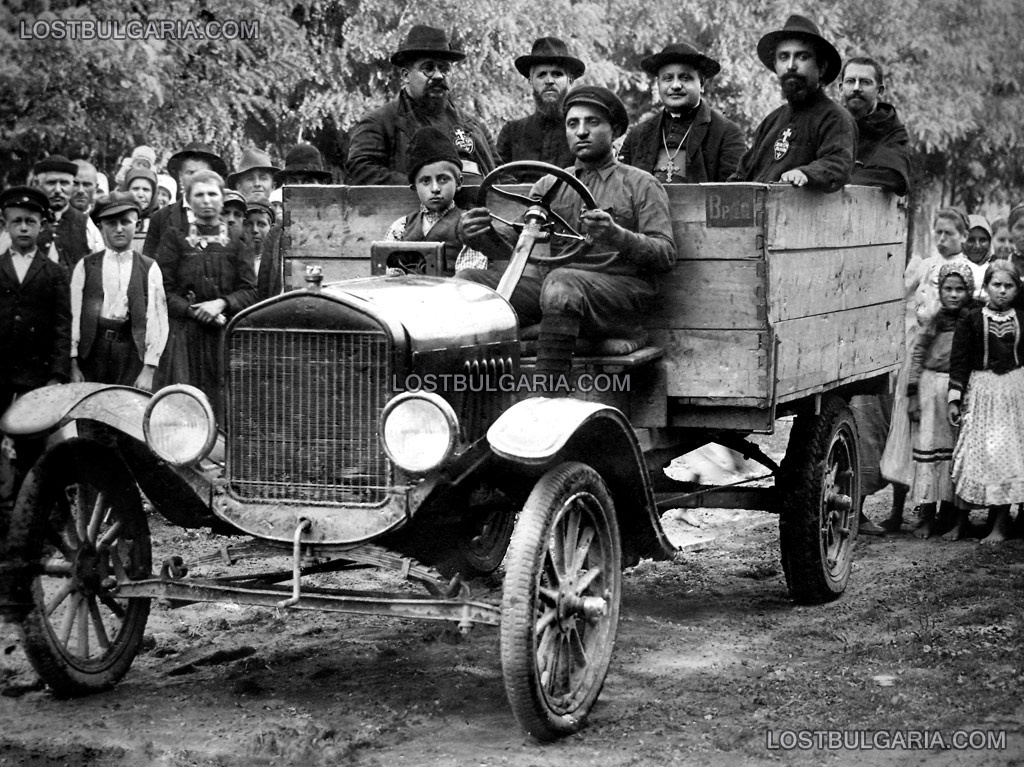
Pope John XXIII comes to the village

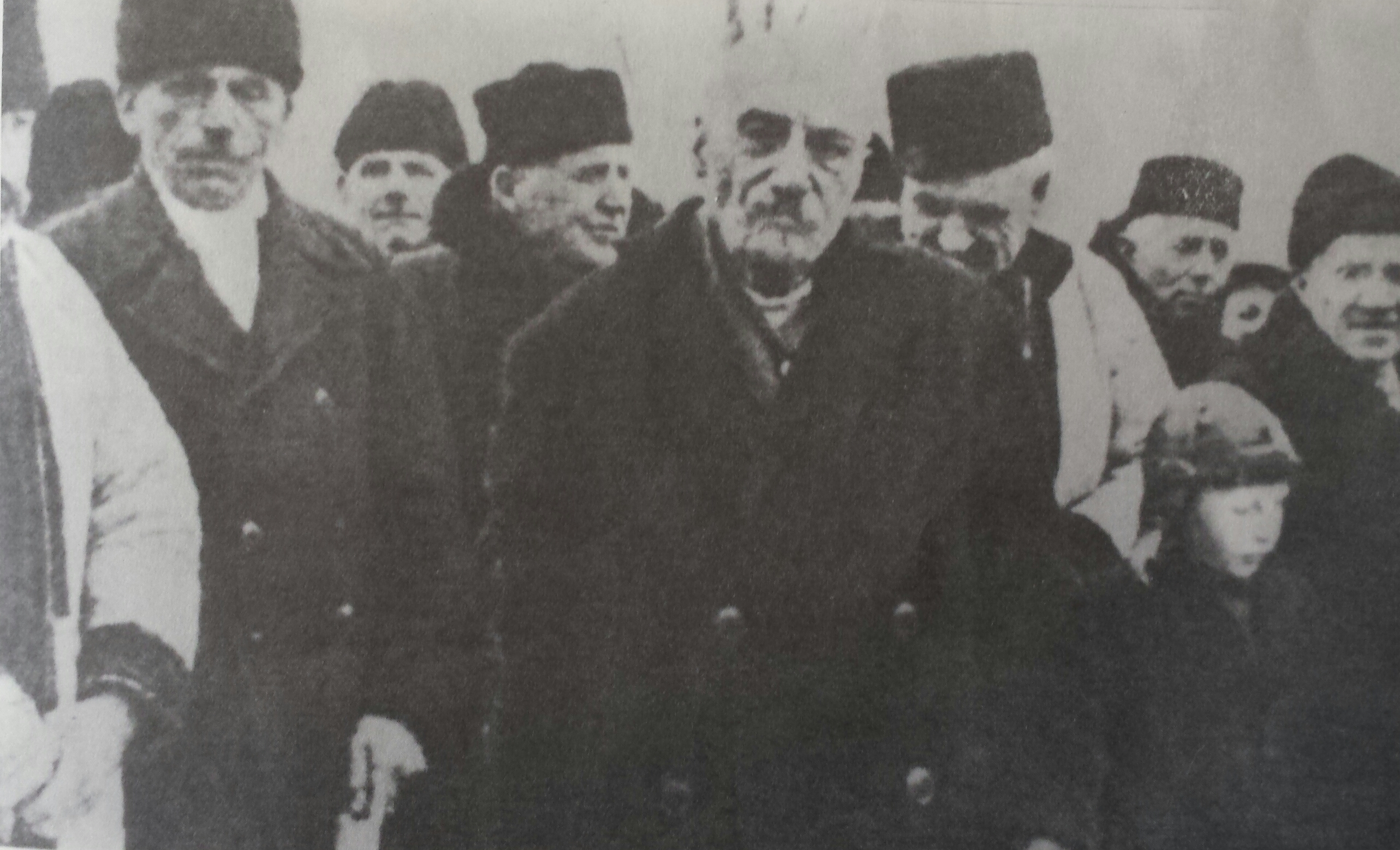
Lukan Chukanov and other founders of the village

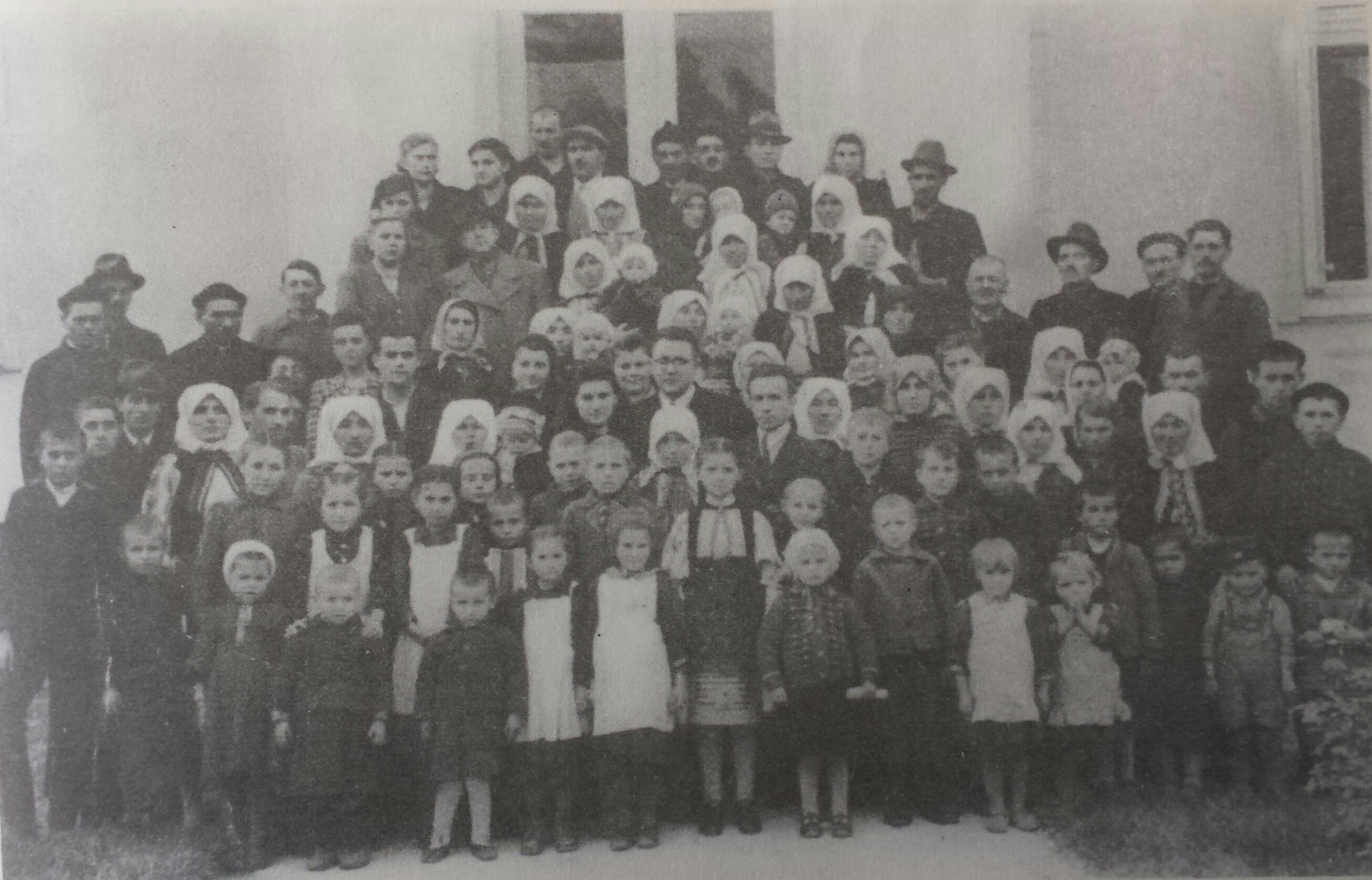
The last settlers from Dudeștii Vechi

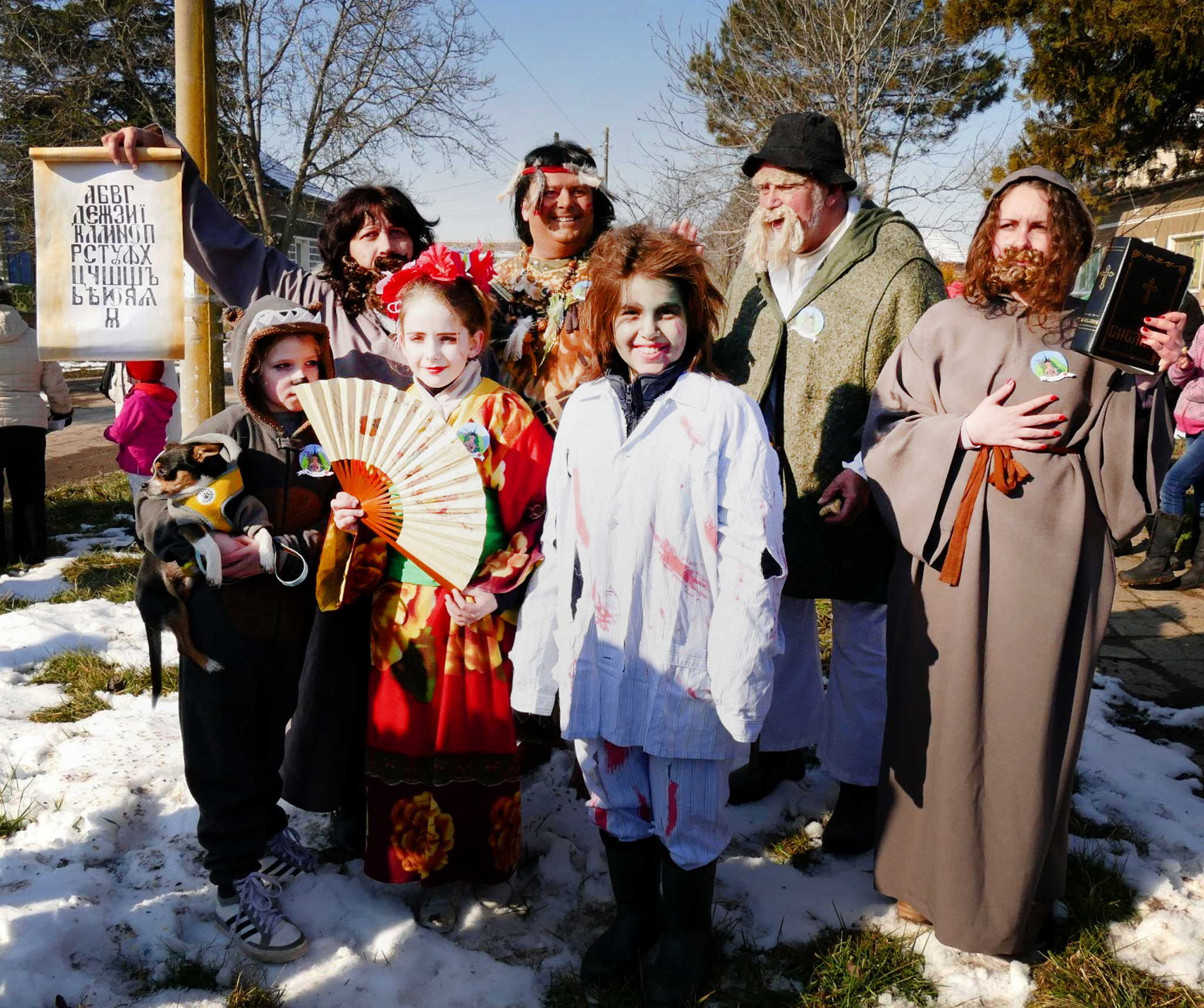
Participants at the Fershangi International Festival in Bardarski Geran in 2015

== Notable people ==
- Lukan Chukanov – first mayor of the village
- Gjura Telbiz – first teacher in the village
- Eugene Bossilkov – member of the Passionist Congregation, Roman Catholic bishop of Nikopol and martyr in the Communist campaign in Bulgaria against religion
- Anton Gjukov – scenograph
- Stojan Francov – first principal of the school in the village
- Svetlana Karadzhova – public figure, mayor 2011 – 2015
