= Paulician dialect =

Dialect of Bulgarian

The Paulician dialect (Bulgarian: Павликянски говор, romanized: Pavlikyanski govor) is a Bulgarian dialect of the Rhodopean group of the Rup dialects. The Paulician dialect is spoken by some 40,000 people, nearly all of them Catholic Bulgarians, in the region of Rakovski in southern Bulgaria and Svishtov in northern Bulgaria, as well as regions in Romania. The language of the Banat Bulgarians, late 17th century Bulgarian Catholic migrants to Banat, is phonologically and morphologically identical to the Paulician dialect (Banat Bulgarian dialect). The dialect's name derives from the Paulicians, believed to be the ancestors of the Catholic Banat Bulgarians.

However, as a result of its three-century separation from Standard Bulgarian and its close interaction with German and Hungarian, Banat Bulgarian has adopted a number of loanwords not present in Standard Bulgarian and a Croatian-based Latin alphabet and is therefore now considered to be one of the three literary forms of Modern Bulgarian. The Paulician dialect is almost entirely surrounded by the Central Balkan dialect. It keeps many archaic characteristics and thus represents an older stage of development of the Rhodopean dialects. Other ex-Paulicians - the "Lovech Pomaks" in northern Bulgaria speak the Galata dialect, which covers the regiolects of the villages: Galata, Gradeshnitsa, Bulgarski Izvor, Kirchevo (Pomashka Leshnitsa), Dobrevtsi, and Rumyantsevo (Blasnichevo). In the past, this dialect had covered areas of the Pleven, Lukovit, Byala Slatina, and Teteven regions.

== Phonological and morphological characteristics ==
- Broad e (æ) for Old Church Slavonic yat in all positions and irrespective of the character of the following syllable : бæл/бæли vs. formal Bulgarian бял/бели (white). However, the broad e has started giving way to ɛ, as in the formal language
- Merger of Old Church Slavonic big yus ѫ, little yus ѧ, ь and ъ into ъ (ə) in a stressed syllable and into a slightly reduced a in an unstressed syllable: къшта (as in formal Bulgarian – house), кл҄ътва vs. formal Bulgarian клетва (oath), гл҄ъдам vs. formal Bulgarian гледам (I look)
- Reduction of stressed broad vowels /ɛ/ and /ɔ/ into their narrow counterparts /i/ and /u/, i.e. a development which is exactly opposite to the vowel reduction in the Balkan dialects: тибе vs. Standard Bulgarian тебе (you), жина vs. Standard Bulgarian жена (woman)
- Traces of Old Bulgarian ы (ɨ): сын vs. formal Bulgarian син (son). An archaic trait, as (ɨ) is considered to be the original pronunciation of Old Church Slavonic ꙑ
- Individual cases of transition of stressed i or (ɨ) into (ɨ) or ə: объчай vs. Standard Bulgarian обичай (custom)[cf. Russian обычай, Polish obyczaj]
- Transition of unstressed i into ə: шъроко vs. Standard Bulgarian широко (wide)
- More consonant depalatalizations than in the rest of the Rup dialects and even Standard Bulgarian: молъ vs. Standard Bulgarian мол҄ъ (I ask)
- Transition of х (x) before a consonant and at the end of the word into the semivowel й (j): тейно vs. Standard Bulgarian техно (theirs)
- Single definite article: -ът, -та, -то, -те

For other phonological and morphological characteristics typical for all Rup or Rhodopean dialects, cf. Rup dialects.

== Sources ==
- Милетич, Любомир: Нашите павликяни. Нови документи по миналото за нашите павликяни. Павликянско наречие., СбНУК, София, 1910 - 1911.
- Стойков, Стойко: Българска диалектология, Акад. изд. "Проф. Марин Дринов", 2006
- Edouard Selian: Le dialect Paulicien, In: The Proceedings of the Fifth International Conference on Armenian Linguistics, McGill University, Montreal, Quebec, Canada, 1995. Publisher: Caravan books, Delmar, New York, 1996, 408 pp.

== See also ==
- Pomak language
