= Eusebius Fermendžin =

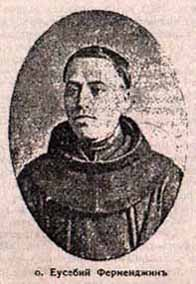
Eusebius Fermendžin

Eusebius Fermendžin (also Fermendzhin, Fermendjin; Bulgarian: Евсевий, Еузебий, Еусебий, or Еусебиус Ферменджин) (21 September 1845 – 25 June 1897) was an Austro-Hungarian high-ranking Roman Catholic cleric, Franciscan friar and academic of Banat Bulgarian origin.

Born in Vinga in the Austrian Empire (today in Romania) to Luka Fermendžin and Agáta Malćin, Fermendžin was educated in his home place and then in Maria Radna and Vienna, he joined the Franciscan order and substituted his secular name Martin with the religious Eusebius. In the Franciscan order, he held several responsible offices, such as Provincial of Budapest, General-Visitor and Definitor of the Provincial of Rome and representative of the Slavic Franciscans in Warsaw (1882).

His main historical works include Acta Bulgariae ecclesiastica аb аnno 1565 usque ad annum 1799, published in Zagreb in 1887, Kronikon Bulgarije, Acta Bosnae potissimum ecclesiastica cum insertis editorum documentorum regestis ab anno 925 usque ad annum 1752, History of the Order of Saint Francis, Krashovan Grammar, etc. He was an active correspondent member of the Zagreb Academy of Sciences.
