= Banat Bulgarian dialect =

Bulgarian dialect of Romania and Serbia

Banat Bulgarian
- Banátsća balgarsćija jazić
- Palćena balgarsćija jazić
- Native to: Romania (Banat, Transylvania), Serbia (Vojvodina)
- Native speakers: 8,000–15,000
- Language family: Indo-European: Balto-Slavic; Slavic; South Slavic; Eastern South Slavic; Bulgarian; Eastern Bulgarian; Rup; Paulician; Banat Bulgarian
- Writing system: Latin

Language codes
- ISO 639-3: –
- Glottolog: bana1308

Nicoleta speaking Banat Bulgarian

Banat Bulgarian (Banat Bulgarian: Palćena balgarsćija jazić or Banátsća balgarsćija jazić; Bulgarian: банатскa българскa книжовна норма, romanized: banatska bâlgarska knižovna norma) is an outermost dialect of the Bulgarian language with standardized writing and an old literary tradition. It is spoken by the Banat Bulgarians in the Banat region of Romania and Serbia. Officially, it is spoken by 8,000 people (1,658 in Serbia, and 6,500 in Romania), though other estimates give numbers up to 15,000.

In 1998, Jáni Vasilčin from Dudeștii Vechi translated the New Testament into Banat Bulgarian: Svetotu Pismu Novija Zákun. In 2017 Ána Marijka Bodor published a Banat Bulgarian translation of Antoine de Saint-Exupéry's Little Prince.

== Origins ==
The Banat Bulgarians are predominantly Roman Catholic people. Their ancestors arrived in the region centuries ago from Northern Bulgaria after the failure of the Chiprovtsi uprising. They settled in Oltenia under the Wallachian prince, then when Oltenia fell to the Ottomans, they fled to Hungary. The ancestor of the Banat Bulgarian language is the Paulician dialect, member of the Rup dialect group.

== History ==
In the 1740s, Blasius Hristofor instituted the first school in Dudeștii Vechi in which Banat Bulgarian was taught using the Latin script. Some Bulgarian priests of the time already used the Latin alphabet, banned by the bishops. In the 19th century, the group's national consciousness strengthened and more Banat books were written.

In the 19th century, Banat Bulgarian schools used the Illyrian-Slavic language. In the course of using Illyrian-Slavic, more Slovenisms entered the language.

The Hungarian Imre Berecz and the Croatian András Klobucsár wrote a few books in their mother tongue. Berecz wrote a catechism in Banat Bulgarian (1851). Klobucsár designed a prayer- and hymn-book. One of the teachers, János Uzun, also wrote secular verses. In 1866, József Rill standardised the Banat Bulgarian language and published Bâlgàrskutu právupísanji (Bulgarian Orthography).

Bâlgarskutu právupísanji was used to design coursebooks in Banat Bulgarian, including an abecedary and reader, together with Biblijata and Gulemija Kátaćizmus. Teacher Leopold Koszilkov was also translating gospels. Fránc Glász and the German Ludovik Fischer wrote a prayer-book. These were notable works notables in Banat Bulgarian literature, and were also very popular. The prayerbooks contain prayers, hymns and the biographies of saints. Koszilkov published calendars.

Banat Bulgarians retained their language. Romanian and Serbo-Croatian were used in schools, but in the catechisms henceforward Banat Bulgarian was used.

== Linguistic features ==
The first codification of the Banat Bulgarian dialect, named "Bâlgarskutu právupísanji" (Modern: Balgarskutu pravupisanji).

The vernacular of the Bulgarians of Banat can be classified as a Paulician dialect of the Eastern Bulgarian group. A typical feature is the "ы" (*y) vowel, which can either take an etymological place or replace "i". Other characteristic phonological features are the "ê" (wide "e") reflex of the Old Church Slavonic yat and the reduction of "o" into "u" and sometimes "e" into "i": puljé instead of pole ("field"), sélu instead of selo ("village"), ugništi instead of ognište ("fireplace"). Another feature is the palatalization of final consonants, which is typical for other Slavic languages but found only in some nonstandard dialects of Bulgarian (in such dialects the word den ("day") sounds like denj) and not in standard Bulgarian.

Lexically, the language has borrowed many words from languages such as German (drot from Draht, "wire"; gáng from Gang, "anteroom, corridor"), Hungarian (vilánj from villany, "electricity"; mozi, "cinema"), Serbo-Croatian (stvár from stvar, "item, matter"; ráčun from račun, "account"), and Romanian (šedinca from ședință, "conference") due to the close contacts with the other peoples of the multiethnic Banat and the religious ties with other Roman Catholic peoples. Banat Bulgarian also has some older loanwords from Ottoman Turkish and Greek, which it shares with other Bulgarian dialects (e.g. hirgjén from Turkish ergen, "unmarried man, bachelor"; trandáfer from Greek τριαντάφυλλο triantafyllo, "rose"). Loanwords constitute around 20% of the Banat Bulgarian vocabulary. The names of some Banat Bulgarians are also influenced by Hungarian names, as the Hungarian (eastern) name order is sometimes used (family name followed by given name) and the female ending "-a" is often dropped from family names. Thus, Marija Velčova would become Velčov Marija.

In addition to loanwords, the lexicon of Banat Bulgarian has also acquired calques and neologisms, such as svetica ("icon", formerly used ikona and influenced by German Heiligenbild), zarno ("bullet", from the word meaning "grain"), oganbalváč ("volcano", literally "fire belcher"), and predhurta ("foreword").

The Banat Bulgarian language has its own alphabet largely based on the Serbo-Croatian Gaj's Latin alphabet and preserves many features that are archaic in the language spoken in Bulgaria. Banat Bulgarian was codified as early as 1866 and is used in literature and the media, which distinguishes it from other Bulgarian dialects.

=== Alphabet ===
The following is a table of the Banat Bulgarian Latin alphabet and the Banat Bulgarian Cyrillic alphabet:

| IPA | Latin | Cyrillic |
|---|---|---|
| /ɤ/ | A, a | Ъ, ъ |
| /a/ | Á, á | А, а |
| /b/ | B, b | Б, б |
| /t͡s/ | C, c | Ц, ц |
| /t͡ʃ/ | Č, č | Ч, ч |
| /kʲ/ | Ć, ć | Ќ, ќ (Кь, кь) |
| /d/ | D, d | Д, д |
| /d͡z/ | Dz, dz | Ѕ, ѕ (Дз, дз) |
| /d͡ʒ/ | Dž, dž | Џ, џ (Дж, дж) |
| /ɛ/ | E, e | Ѣ, ѣ |
| /e/ | É, é | E, e |
| /f/ | F, f | Ф, ф |
| /g/ | G, g | Г, г |
| /gʲ/ | Gj, gj | Ѓ, ѓ (Гь, гь) |
| /x/ | H, h | Х, х |
| /i/ | I, i | И, и |
| /j/ | J, j | Й, й (Ь, ь) |
| /k/ | K, k | К, к |
| /l/ | L, l | Л, л |
| /lʲ/ | Lj, lj | Љ, љ (Ль, ль) |
| /m/ | M, m | М, м |
| /n/ | N, n | Н, н |
| /nʲ/ | Nj, nj, | Њ, њ (Нь, нь) |
| /ɔ/ | O,o | О, о |
| /p/ | P, p | П, п |
| /r/ | R, r | Р, р |
| /s/ | S, s | С, с |
| /ʃ/ | Š, š | Ш, ш |
| /t/ | T, t | Т, т |
| /u/ | U, u | У, у |
| /v/ | V, v | В, в |
| /z/ | Z, z | З, з |
| /ʒ/ | Ž, ž | Ж, ж |

=== Examples ===
The Lord's Prayer in Banat Bulgarian:
| Banat Bulgarian | Banat Bulgarian Cyrillic | English |
|---|---|---|
| Baštá náš, kojtu si na nebeto: Imetu ti da se pusveti. | Бъшта наш, койту си нъ небето: Имету ти дъ се пусвети. | Our father who art in heaven hallowed be thy name. |
| Kraljéstvotu ti da dodi. Olete ti da badi, | Кръльѣствоту ти да доди. Олете ти дъ бъди, | Thy kingdom, come thy will be done, |
| kaćétu na nebeto taj i na zemete. | къкьѣту нъ небето тъй и нъ земете. | as in heaven so on earth. |
| Kátadenjšnija leb náš, dáj mu nám dnés. | Катъденьшнийъ леб наш, дай му нам днѣс. | Give us this day our daily bread. |
| I uprusti mu nám náša dalgj, | И упрусти му нам нашъ дългь, | And forgive us guilty as we are, |
| kaćétu i nija upráštemi na nášte dlažnici. | къкьѣту и нийъ упраштеми нъ наште длъжници. | as we also forgive our debtors. |
| I nide mu uvižde u nápas, | И ниде му увижде у напъс, | Also do not bring us into temptation, |
| negu mu izbávej ud zlo. | негу му избавей уд зло. | But free us from this evil. |

| Standard Bulgarian transliterated | Standard Bulgarian Cyrillic |
|---|---|
| Otče naš, Ti, kojto si na nebeto, da se sveti imeto Ti, | Отче наш, Ти, който си на небето, да се свети името Ти, |
| da dojde carstvoto Ti, da bǎde voljata Ti, | да дойде царството Ти, да бъде волята Ти, |
| kakto na nebeto, taka i na zemjata. | както на небето, така и на земята. |
| Nasǎštnija ni hljab daj ni dnes | Насъщния ни хляб дай ни днес |
| i prosti nam grehovete ni, | и прости нам греховете ни, |
| tǎj kakto i nie proštavame na bližnite si, | тъй както и ние прощаваме на ближните си, |
| i ne ni vǎveždaj v izkušenie, | и не ни въвеждай в изкушение, |
| ala izbavi ni ot Lukavija. | ала избави ни от Лукавия. |

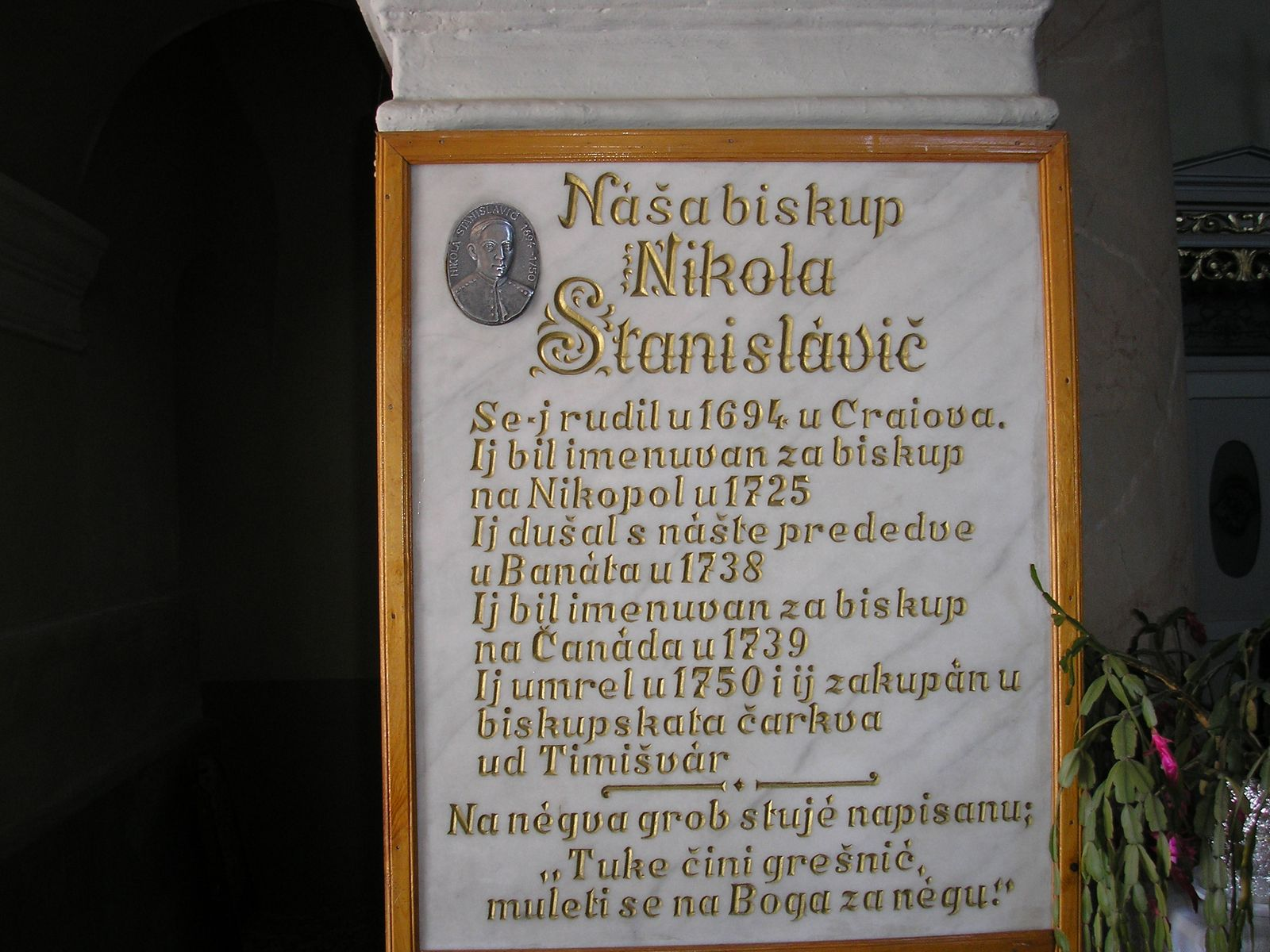
Inscription about bishop Nikola Stanislavič in the Dudeștii Vechi church

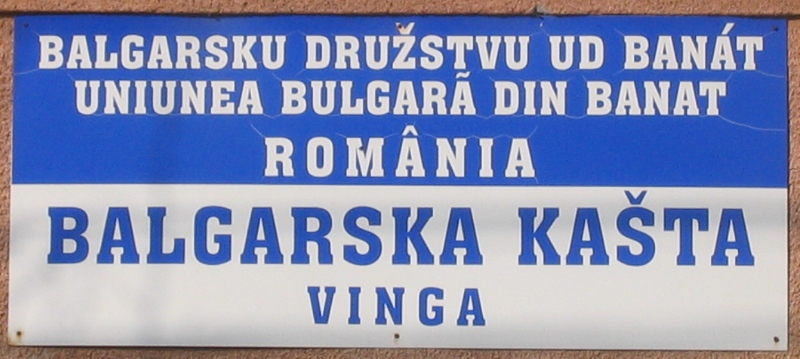
Bilingual Banat Bulgarian (written in Latin letters) – Romanian plaque in Vinga

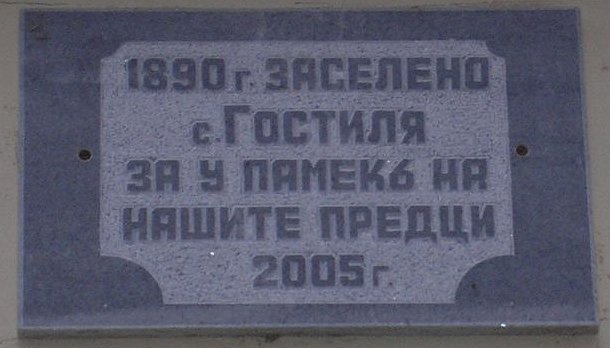
A rare example of Banat Bulgarian written in Cyrillic letters in Gostilya, Bulgaria
