= Dudeștii Vechi =

Dudeștii Vechi Stár Bišnov
- Commune
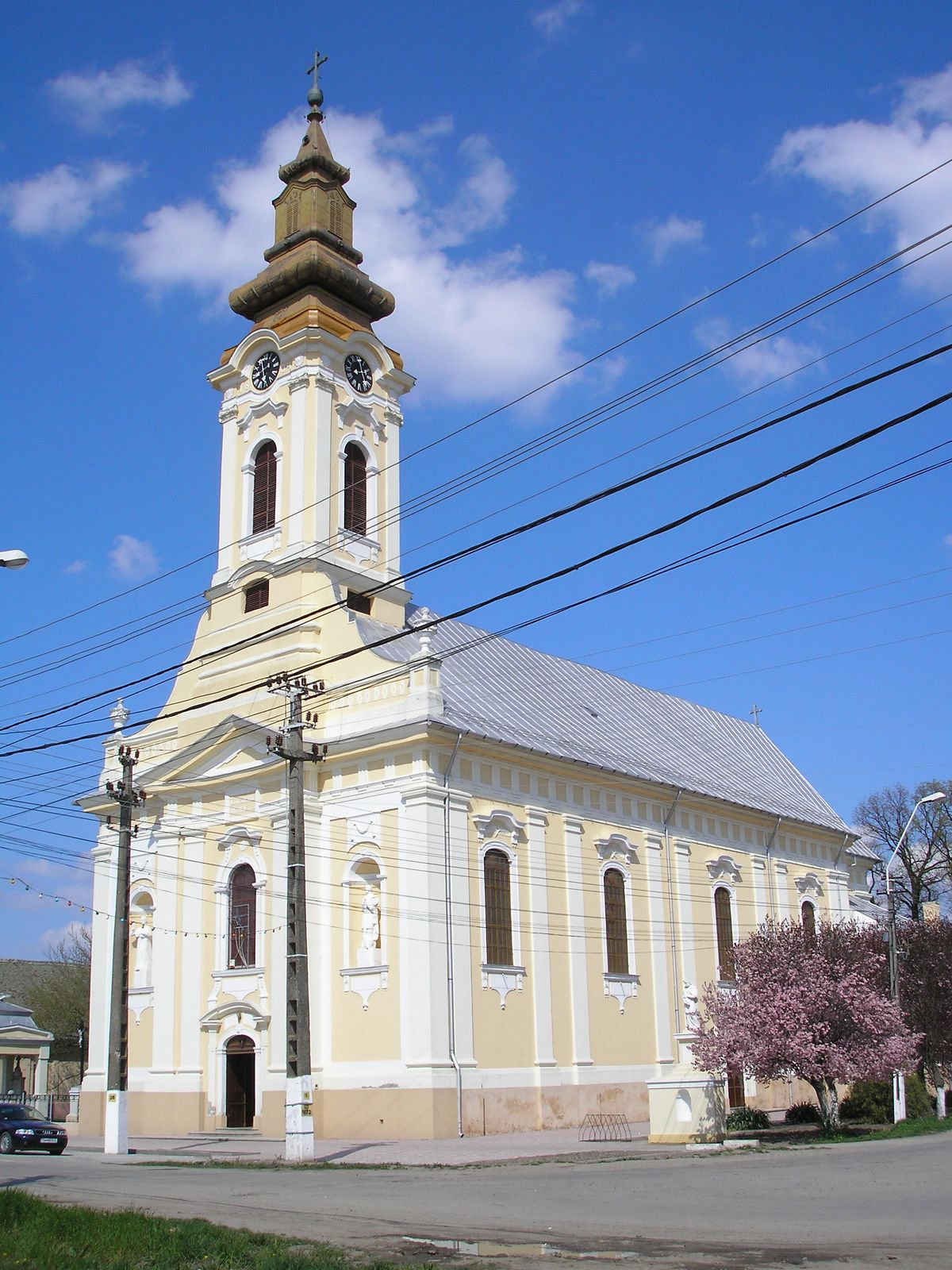
- Banat Bulgarian Roman Catholic church in Dudeștii Vechi (Stár Bišnov)

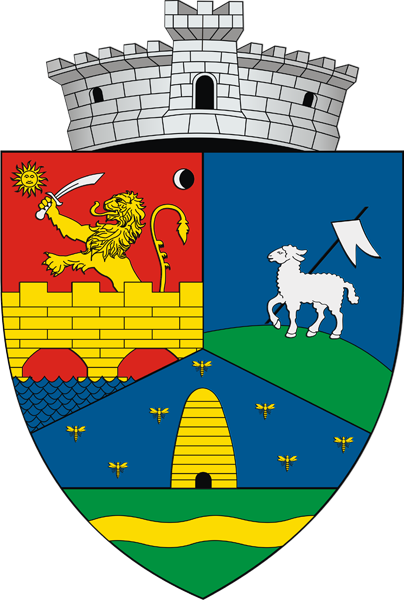
- Coat of arms

- Location in Timiș County

- Location in Romania
- Coordinates: 46°03′N 20°29′E
- Country: Romania
- County: Timiș

Government
  - Mayor (2016–): Bono Cucalan (PSD)
- Area: 190.62 km^{2} (73.60 sq mi)
- Population (2021-12-01): 3,827
  - Density: 20.08/km^{2} (52.00/sq mi)
- Time zone: UTC+02:00 (EET)
  - Summer (DST): UTC+03:00 (EEST)
- Postal code: 307150–307152
- Vehicle reg.: TM
- Website: dudestii-vechi.ro

Dudeștii Vechi (until 1964 Beșenova Veche; Banat Bulgarian: Stár Bišnov; Hungarian: Óbesenyő; German: Altbeschenowa; Serbian: Старо Бешеново, romanized: Staro Bešenovo) is a commune in Timiș County, Romania. It is composed of three villages: Cheglevici, Colonia Bulgară and Dudeștii Vechi (commune seat). It also included Vălcani until 2005, when it was split off to form a separate commune. Dudeștii Vechi is mostly populated by Banat Bulgarians (Palćene), a regional minority group of ethnic Bulgarians that profess Roman Catholicism, who came from northern Bulgaria, and who are descendants of Paulicians that settled in the area around 1738.

== Geography ==
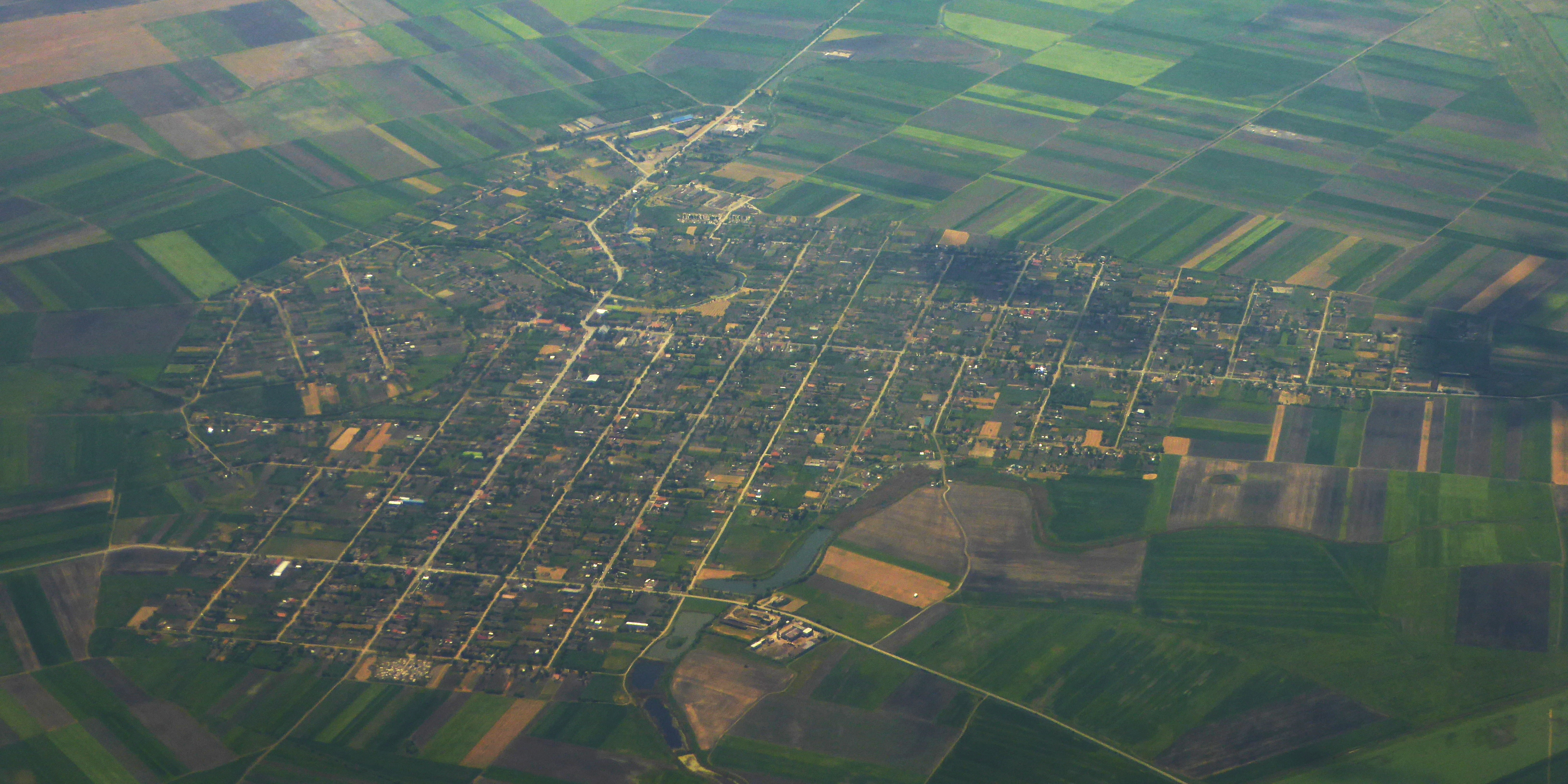
View from the north of Dudeștii Vechi

Dudeștii Vechi is located in the western extremity of Timiș County. The nearest town is Sânnicolau Mare, 11 km away. Dudeștii Vechi lies in the Aranca Plain, the lowest sector of the Mureș Plain. The Aranca Plain has a monotonous relief, of low plain, with wide and straight interfluves, interrupted, in some places, by high mounds. The origin of these mounds is either anthropic (Neolithic tumuli) or structural (the presence in the subsoil of "pits" of stronger sandy clays or local "swellings" of the clay, due to a higher local groundwater level).

=== Climate ===
The climate is temperate continental, with Western European and sub-Mediterranean influences. The former are felt by the predominance of western and northwestern air currents and the reduction of the climatic contrast between winter and summer, and the sub-Mediterranean influences, determined by the southwestern air currents from the Adriatic Sea, determine a "taming" of winter rigors. The average annual temperature at the nearest station is 10.8 °C, the average amount of precipitation is relatively low (544.3 mm), and the number of rainy days is low during the year (less than 110 days). These values prove the arid, steppe character of the climate in this area.

=== Hydrography ===
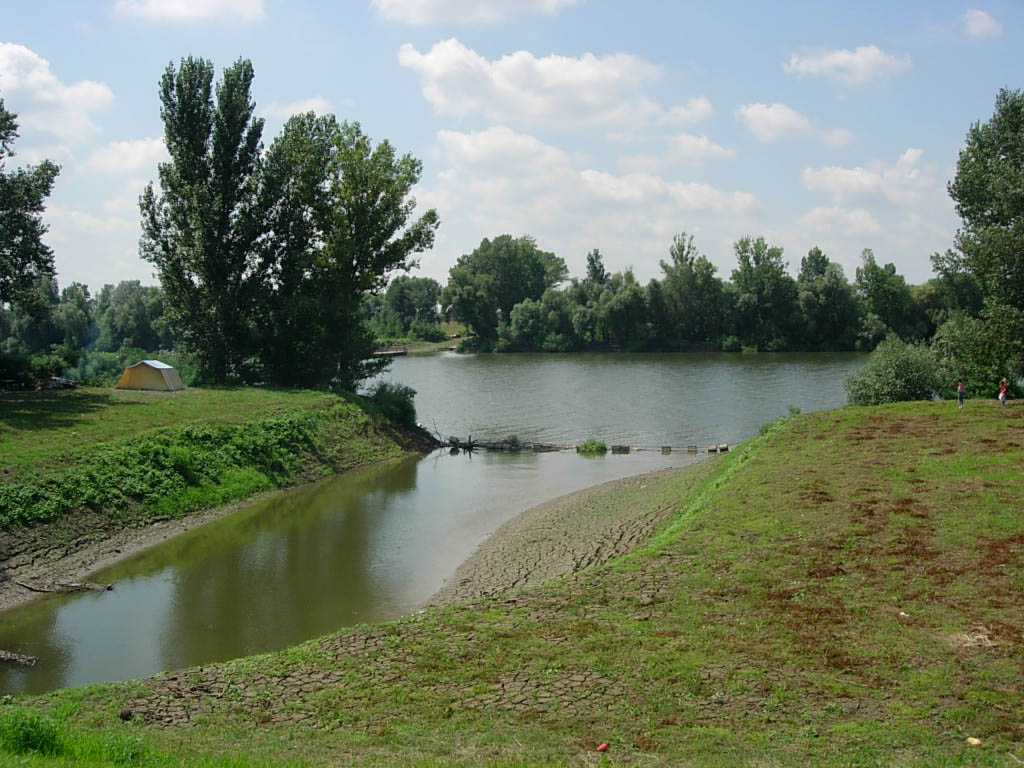
Aranca (known in Serbian as Златица/Zlatica) near Padej, Serbia. This is the place where Aranca meets Tisa.

The surface hydrographic network is represented by the Aranca River and the system of drainage and irrigation canals. The Aranca River springs from the Vinga Plain, close to the Mureș riverbed, between Felnac to the east and Sânpetru German to the west. It covers a distance of 108 km on the territory of Romania, draining an area of 1,016 km^{2}. However, the slope of the riverbed is very small, almost horizontal, which is why the river is very winding, with many meanders, disentanglements and abandoned arms. The Aranca course was connected to a system of canals built in order to drain and eliminate excess water from the soil surface. On the territory of Dudeștii Vechi, the most important is the Aranca–Mureș Canal, with a length of 17.5 km and a width of 31.28 m. Its banks were dammed over a length of 10 km. Other canals located near the village are Cociohat, located west, Mureșan and Țiganca.

=== Flora ===
The vegetation falls, for the most part, in the forest-steppe area (natural meadows, with small portions of forest, isolated trees and shrubs), although some authors place it in the steppe area. In the historical past, forested lands occupied much larger areas, but were cleared. Depending on its characteristics, determined by the living environment (soils, the presence of watercourses, human intervention, by plowing, grazing or land improvement works, etc.), the vegetation can be divided into three categories: woody vegetation, grassy vegetation and swamp vegetation.

The woody vegetation is represented by bushes and trees that have developed on reproductive lands, along canals, ditches, roads and railways. Some of the characteristic species are: poplar, willow, locust, oak, elm, hazelnut, dog rose, blackthorn, lilac, privet, etc.

Along the Aranca River, riverside meadows develop, with large grasses such as: fescue, cock's-foot, foxtail, goosefoot, mint, nettle, horsetail, celandine, bedstraw, St. John's wort, basil, etc. On the fields (interfluves) a halophilous grassy vegetation developed: windgrass, meadow-grass, ryegrass, white clover, feather grass, musk thistle, belladonna, blue eryngo, coltsfoot, foxtail, yarrow, etc. Chamomiles, statices, plantains, wormwoods, wheatgrasses, mints, etc. grow on salt marshes and morasses.

The vegetation in the swampy areas is represented by: bur-reed, Johnson grass, sedge, scouring rush, creeping buttercup, etc. A specific flora develops on the canals, represented by: water lilies, reeds, rushes, arrowhead, water silk, pondweeds, willows, osiers, etc. A variety of weeds appear in the cultivated fields, such as: wheatgrass, knotgrass, Johnson grass, pigweed, corn-cockle, field thistle, white clover, red poppy, cornflower, spiny restharrow, burdock, danewort, etc.

=== Fauna ===
The terrestrial fauna presents elements specific to Central Europe (wolf, fox, wild boar, etc.), but also elements specific to the steppe (suslik, mole, mole rat, etc.). Mammals are represented by rodents (suslik, hamster, mole rat, field mouse, hare), herbivores (deer), carnivores (wolf, polecat, weasel), omnivores (fox, wild boar). Birds are represented by: quail, partridge, starling, pheasant, rook, raven, bustard (rare), corn crake, short-toed lark, cuckoo, etc. There are also birds of prey such as harriers, long-legged buzzards and owls. Aquatic fauna is represented by: roach, perch, ruffe, pike, bleak, sunfish, brown bullhead, Prussian carp, carp, rudd, etc.

== History ==
The first recorded mention of Dudeștii Vechi dates from 1238 (or 1213 according to other sources). Beșenova, as it was called at that time, belonged to the Cenad Fortress, enjoying privileges and having the right, from 1331, to organize weekly markets. But in the 16th century, both the nobility and the serfdom left the village, which then came under Turkish rule. On a map from 1715, the locality is mentioned under the name Besenyö as a settlement with a church and a kule, but on Count Mercy's map of 1723 the place is recorded as a deserted settlement.

The present-day settlement was re-established in 1738 and colonized by Bulgarians from Nikopol and its environs. Other Bulgarians settled in Lovrin, but from there, in 1742, 200 families moved to Beșenova. In 1779, Beșenova Veche was included in Torontál County and was governed by the laws of the Austrian state, in a permissive, democratic style, using the Bulgarian language in relations with its countrymen. In 1787, when Gjura Lebanovici was mayor of Beșenova, the village was raised by Joseph II to the rank of town and was given the right to hold a weekly market every Thursday and, twice a year, on 15 May and 15 November, a fair. Also during Lebanovici's mayorship (1784–1787), the bridge was built over the old Aranca riverbed, on the road leading to Szeged, today the Roma neighborhood (Gornija Most). From 1781, by successive intercalation, Gjura Uzunov was mayor, during which the granary in the center of the commune was built, demolished only in 1974. Also during his time the construction of the church began.

In 1840, the current building in which the Dudeștii Vechi Town Hall operates is built. The railway between Vălcani and Periam was inaugurated thirty years later. Around 1894, the first branch of a political formation appeared – the Socialist Party, the head of the branch being Petru Telbis. After the loss of power, the Socialists (known locally as țoțuliști) emigrated to America to work. Around the same time, thanks to the united guild of craftsmen, the People's Bank of Cenad and the Delridek Agricultural Bank opened their first subsidiaries here.

== Demographics ==
Ethnic composition (2021)
1. Bulgarians (42.6%)
2. Romanians (39.4%)
3. Roma (6.16%)
4. Hungarians (3.34%)
5. Unknown (7.05%)
6. Others (1.49%)
Religious composition (2021)
1. Roman Catholics (63.6%)
2. Orthodox (24.7%)
3. Pentecostals (1.82%)
4. Unknown (7.49%)
5. Others (1.80%)
6. Irreligious, atheists and agnostics (0.60%)

Dudeștii Vechi had a population of 3,827 inhabitants at the 2021 census, down 8.95% from the 2011 census. In terms of ethnicity, there is no majority group, the inhabitants being Bulgarians (42.61%), Romanians (39.35%), Roma (6.16%) and Hungarians (3.34%). For 7.05% of the population, ethnicity is unknown. By religion, most inhabitants are Roman Catholics (63.6%), but there are also minorities of Orthodox (24.69%) and Pentecostals (1.82%). For 7.49% of the population, religious affiliation is unknown.

Census		Ethnic composition
Year	Population	Romanians	Hungarians	Germans	Roma	Bulgarians
1880	7,903	55	335	1,167	–	–
1890	8,172	69	308	1,346	–	–
1900	7,781	56	433	1,454	–	–
1910	7,829	114	643	1,267	–	–
1920	7,816	23	557	1,269	–	–
1930	8,191	111	824	1,246	229	5,744
1941	8,226	268	709	1,127	–	–
1956	7,448	–	–	–	–	–
1966	7,155	502	769	475	160	5,203
1977	6,299	672	545	309	88	4,658
1992	5,130	832	296	52	290	3,623
2002	4,481	1,022	274	42	166	2,931
2011	4,203	1,122	159	27	222	2,439
2021	3,827	1,506	128	23	236	1,631

== Politics and administration ==
The commune of Dudeștii Vechi is administered by a mayor and a local council composed of 13 councilors. The mayor, Bono Cucalan, from the Social Democratic Party, has been in office since 2016. As from the 2024 local elections, the local council has the following composition by political parties:

Party	Seats	Composition
Bulgarian Union of Banat–Romania	5	
Social Democratic Party	5	
National Liberal Party	1	
Alliance for the Union of Romanians	1	
Force of the Right	1	

== Education ==
The school in Dudeștii Vechi was founded in 1745 by the Bulgarian settlers with the help of the Roman Catholic Church. It is the oldest school of the Bulgarian diaspora and the only school in Romania where Bulgarian language is taught to all grades. As of 2004, education in Bulgarian was optional, but efforts were made to transform the school into a bilingual one.

== See also ==
- Banat Bulgarians
