= Vinga, Arad =

Vinga
- Commune
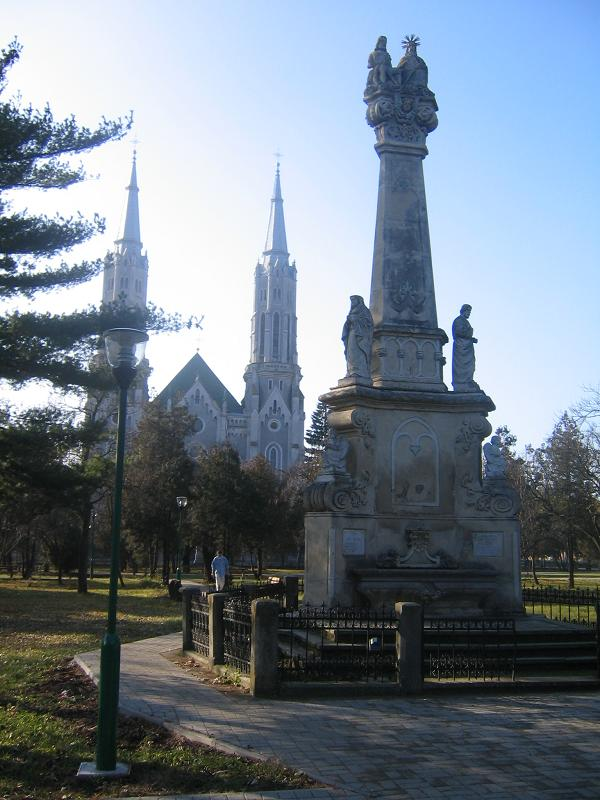
- Roman Catholic Church and the square

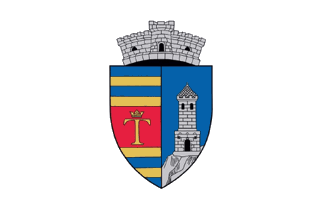
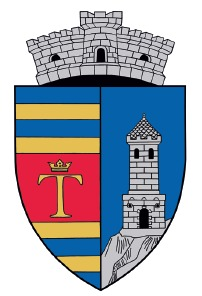
- Flag Coat of arms

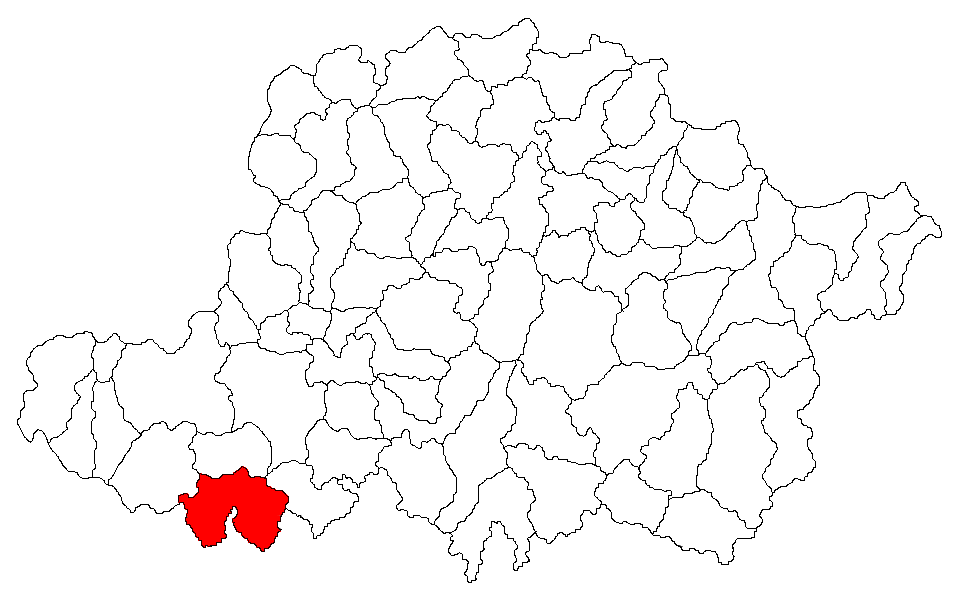
- Location in Arad County

- Location in Romania
- Coordinates: 46°1′N 21°13′E
- Country: Romania
- County: Arad
- Area: 155 km^{2} (60 sq mi)
- Elevation: 109 m (358 ft)
- Population (2021-12-01): 6,083
  - Density: 39.2/km^{2} (102/sq mi)
- Time zone: UTC+02:00 (EET)
  - Summer (DST): UTC+03:00 (EEST)
- Vehicle reg.: AR

Vinga is a commune in Arad County, western Romania, south of the county seat of Arad, with a population of 5,828 inhabitants (as of 2011). Vinga is located in the northern section of the Banat. The people in Vinga are mainly Romanians, the second largest ethnic group being Hungarians. There is a Bulgarian minority of Catholic faith, known as the Banat Bulgarians, who have historically been the dominant ethnicity in Vinga.

== History ==
The first evidence of Vinga's existence as a small village dates back to 1231 A.D. After Vinga was destroyed by Turks during the expansion of the Ottoman Empire, Vinga was repopulated in the year 1741 with 125 families of ethnic Bulgarians from Chiprovtsi, joined later by Romanians from the surrounding area. After World War I, a majority of these Bulgarian families moved to Arad and Timișoara. After World War II, more and more Bulgarians moved to Vinga and began to own large and important pieces of land in the area. During the communist regime of Nicolae Ceauşescu, the government promised to contribute and renovate Vinga so that it could be recognized as a small town. However, these promises were not kept because the revolution of 1989 occurred and a new government was formed.

== Religion ==
When Bulgarians came to Vinga, they brought with them their culture, their language, and also their religion of Roman Catholicism. The imposing Catholic church, which was built by ethnic Bulgarians in the early 1890s, can be seen from afar. There is also an Orthodox church, which represents the main religion of Romanians living in the area. Furthermore, there is a Baptist church, which holds around 30 members, and a Pentecostal church which is located near the Baptist church.

== Population and ethnic changes ==
Changes in population distribution in Vinga village
Census		Ethnic origin							
Year	Population	Romanians	Banat Bulgarians	Germans	Hungarians	Roma	Serbs	Slovaks	Other origins
1880	4,796	263	3,543	652	278	6	9	45	–
1900	4,762	455	2,818	704	718	?	31	36	?
1930	4,764	1,108	2,208	392	919	64	14	22	26
1977	4,617	2,239	1,103	70	983	181	3	14	20
1992	4,132	2,147	690	40	686	463	5	29	71
2002	4,218	2,632	510	31	533	397	3	18	94

== Demographics ==
At the 2011 census, the commune had 5828 inhabitants. Of these 58.11% were ethnic Romanians, 20.86% Hungarians, 11.06% Roma, 5.57% Bulgarians, 2.59% Slovaks, 0.9% Ukrainians and 0.2% Serbs. The commune is composed of three villages:

In Romanian	In Hungarian	Ethnic majority
Mailat	Majláthfalva	Hungarians
Mănăștur	Monostor	Romanians
Vinga	Vinga	Romanians

== Travel and transportation ==
There is a major European road running through Vinga (E671), connecting it to Arad to the North and Timișoara to the South. Vinga also has a train station running the same general direction as the road, connecting these two major cities, Arad and Timișoara. Many people in Vinga commute to one of these cities to work. Being a commune, it has two associate small towns (villages) in its administrative jurisdiction: Mănăștur and Mailat.

== Natives ==
- Stefan Dunjov
- Eusebius Fermendžin

== Gallery ==
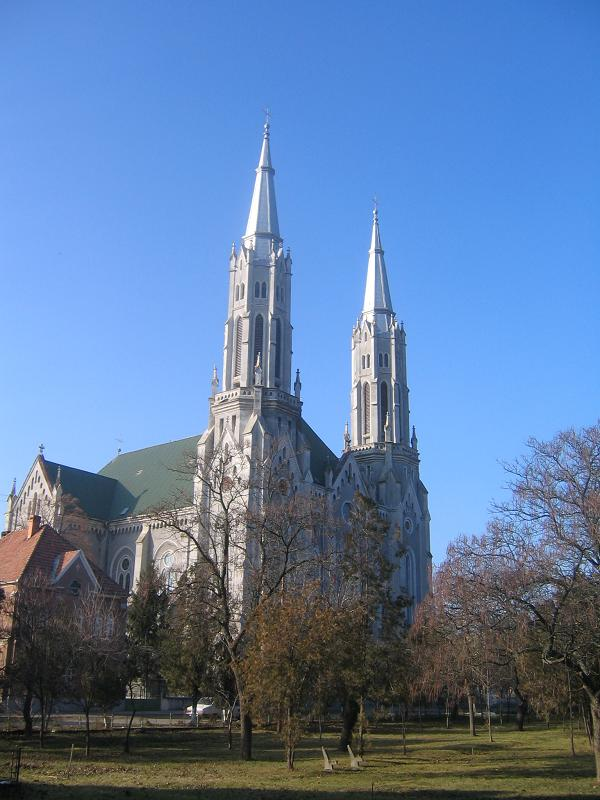
Church

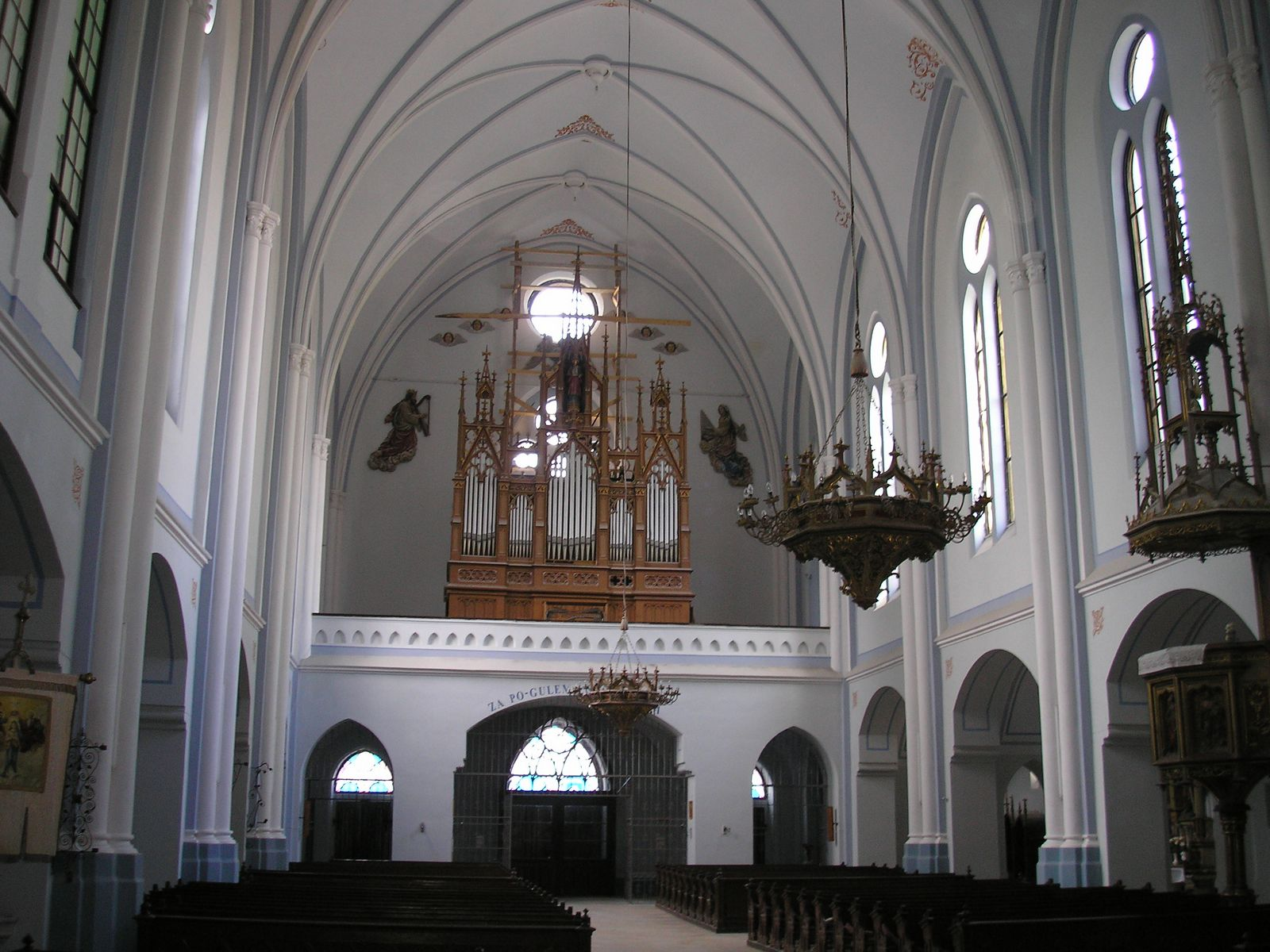
Church inside

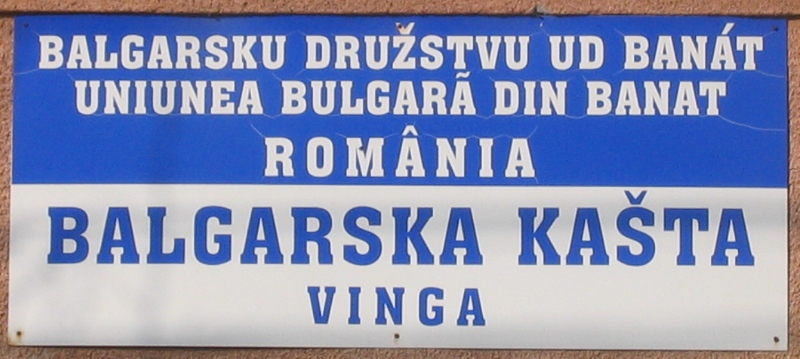
Bulgarian House plaque

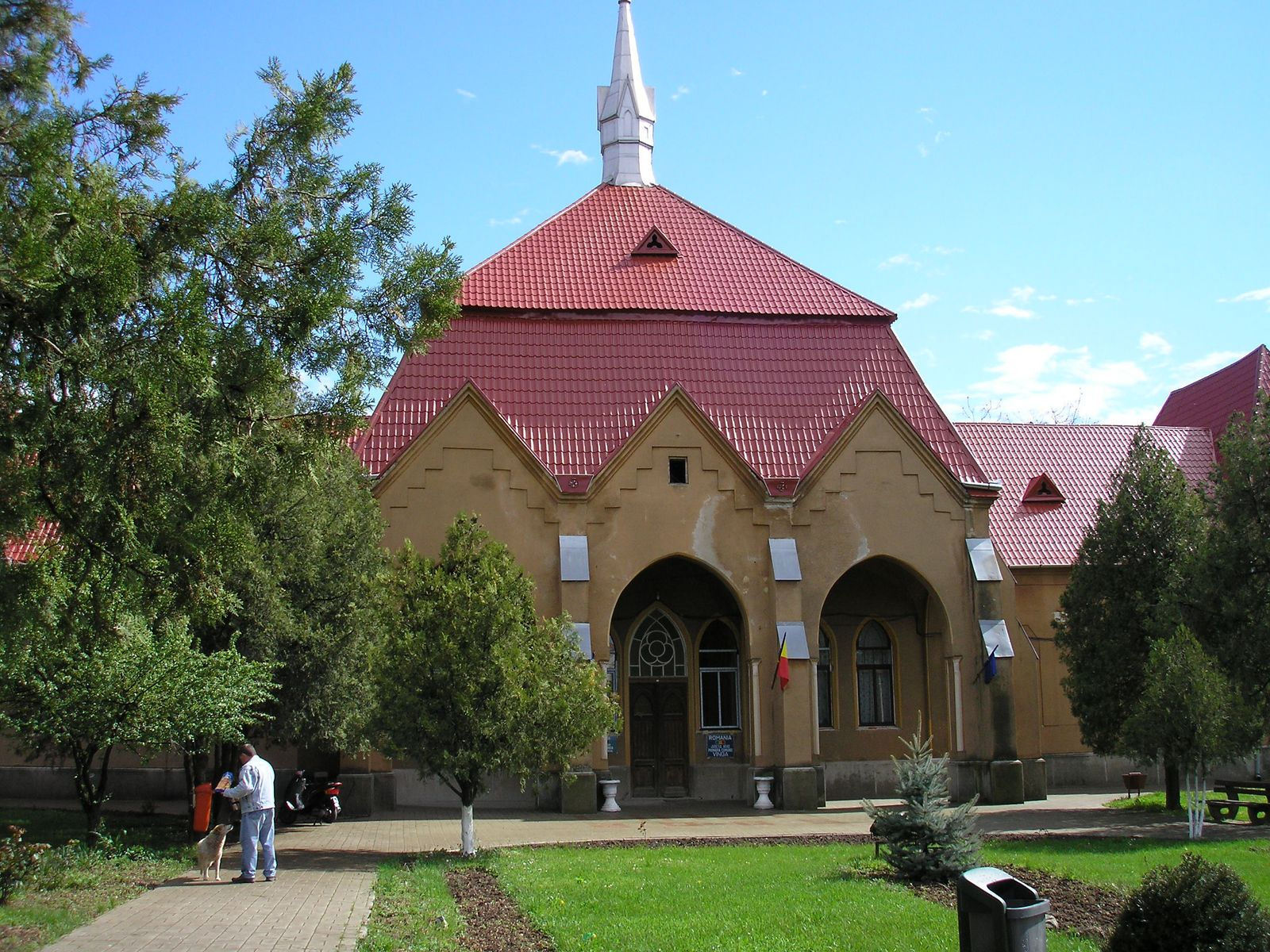
Mayor's Office, former Franciscan monastery
