= Kaluđerski Skokovi =

- Калуђерски Скокови; Kaluđerski Skokovi
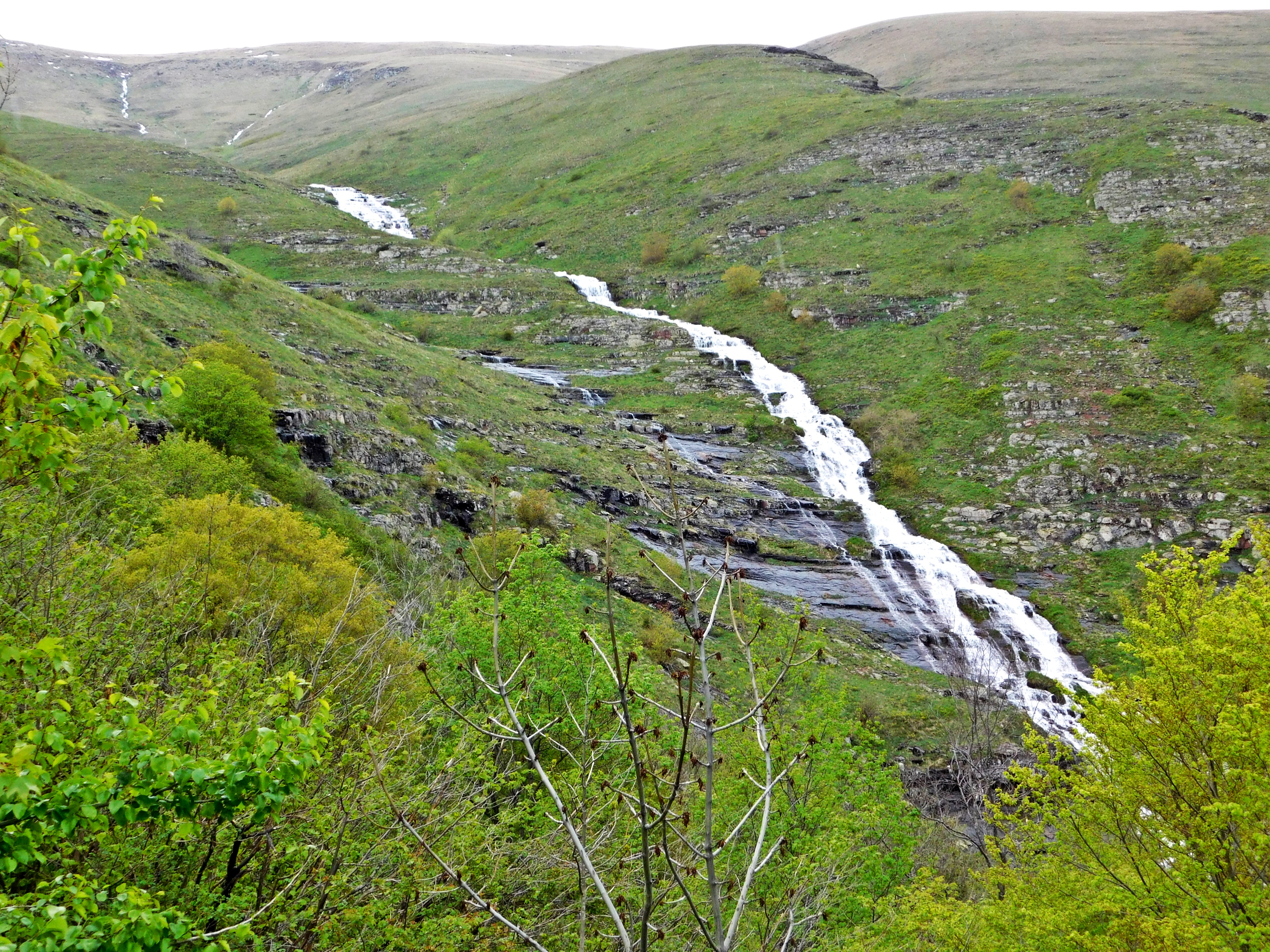

- Location within Serbia
- Location: Topli Do, City of Pirot; Pirot District, Serbia
- Coordinates: 43.38206°N 22.66952°E
- Type: cascade
- Total height: 232 m (761 ft)

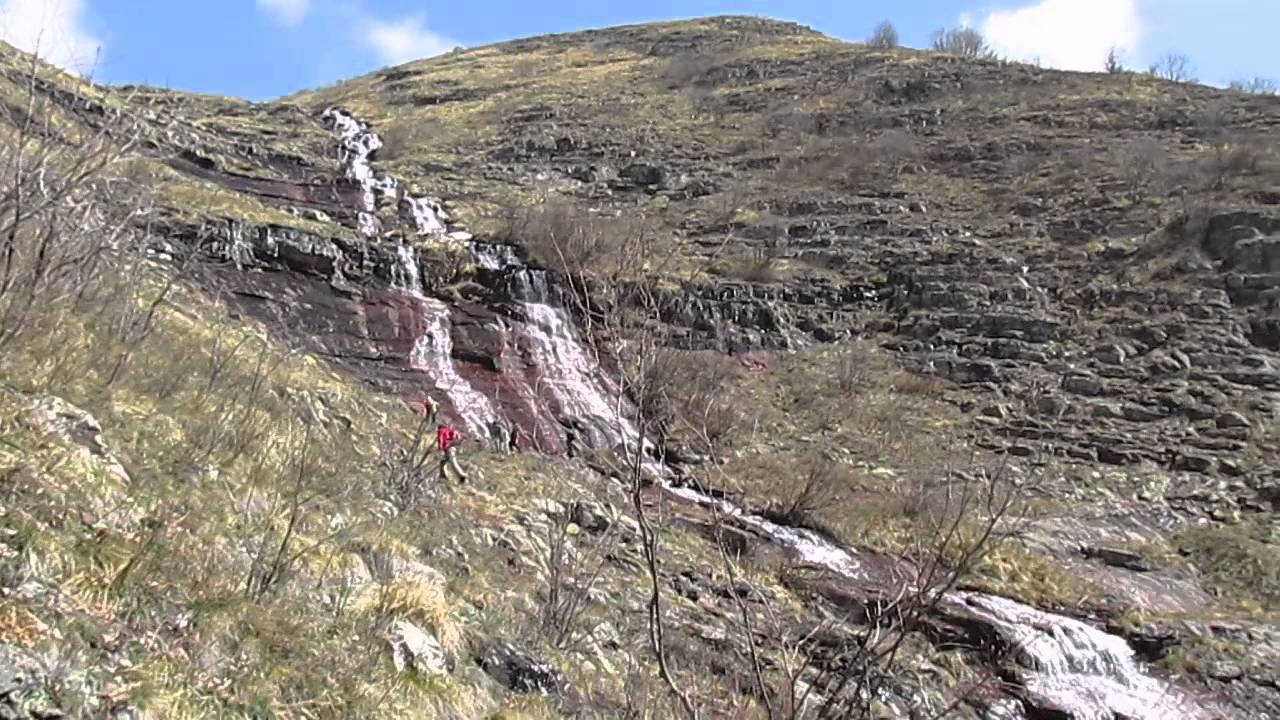

Kaluđerski Skokovi (Serbian: Калуђерски Скокови) is the highest waterfall in Serbia. It is located on the Stara Planina mountain in southeast Serbia. Only discovered in 2012, it is 232 m (761 ft) high, which is over twice more than the Kopren Waterfall, previously the highest waterfall in Serbia, which itself was discovered only a year earlier.

== Location ==
The Kaluđerski Skokovi falls are situated in the area of the Topli Do village, northeast of the city of Pirot, to which it administratively belongs. The waterfall is located just southwest of the Midžor peak on the Stara Planina mountain, close to the border with Bulgaria.

== Characteristics ==
The waterfall is located on the river of Kaluđerska reka, which flows into the Rakitska reka, which in turn forms the Toplodolska reka with the Javorska reka.

The waterfall is 232 m (761 ft) high, 404 m (1,325 ft) long and is a typical cascade waterfall. On average, the inclination of the falls is 55 to 60 degrees, but some sections are almost straight, up to 90 degrees. It has over 20 cascades. The Midžor itself is 2,169 m (7,116 ft) high, and the waterfall starts at an altitude of 1,554 m (5,098 ft) and ends at 1,322 m (4,337 ft).

== Accessibility ==
The waterfall is hard to access. It is possible to reach it only in the early spring, while the region is still under snow, and with full rock-climbing equipment. During summer, the already steep rocks grow into the thick, lush vegetation. Due to the topographic relief, Kaluđerski Skokovi in full can only be observed from the air.

== History ==
Dragovan Stojadinović, amateur explorer who discovered some of the highest waterfalls in Serbia, discovered the Kaluđerski skokovi in 2012. On 9 June 2012 professors from the University of Belgrade's Faculty of mining and geology and the Institute for nature conservation of Serbia measured the waterfall.

Developments in the recent two decades completely changed the geography of Serbia, when it comes to waterfalls. Area of the Stara Planina has always been sparsely populated and inaccessible because of the rugged and forested terrain, but also as a location of the Serbian-Bulgarian border. As armies gradually relinquished the borders keeping to the police, civilians were allowed to explore the area. As a result, higher and higher waterfalls have been discovered on the Serbian side of the Stara Planina since then: Čungulj in 1996 - 43 m (141 ft); Pilj in 2002 - 64 m (210 ft); Kopren in 2011 - 103.5 m (340 ft) and Kaluđerski Skokovi in 2012 - 232 m (761 ft).

== See also ==
- List of waterfalls
- List of waterfalls in Serbia
