= List of waterfalls in Serbia =

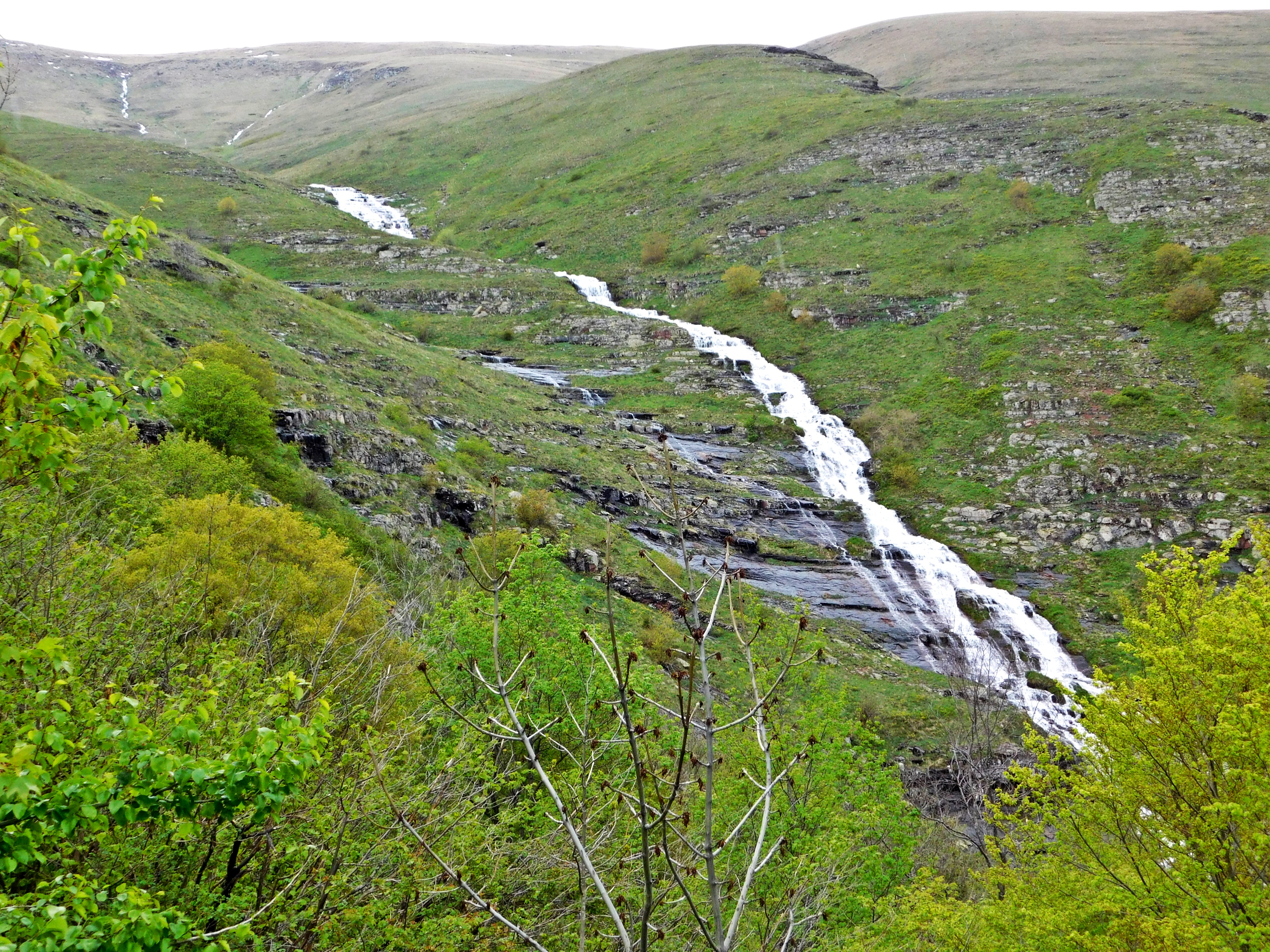
Kaluđerski Skokovi Waterfall

Despite some of them having turned into tourist attractions, waterfalls in Serbia are generally not well known, mostly because they are not particularly high. Actually, until the late 1990s, the highest waterfalls in Serbia are believed to be 25 to 30 meters. Since then, several waterfalls were discovered in the previously geologically unexplored areas of the south-eastern Serbia (namely, the Visok region), including some of the highest ones, changing the geography of Serbia.

== Kaluđerski Skokovi ==
Kaluđerski Skokovi (Serbian Cyrillic: Калуђерски Скокови) is the highest waterfall in Serbia. It was discovered in 2012 and measured on 9 June 2012. It is 232 meters high.

== Kopren Waterfall ==
Kopren Waterfall (Копрен) is the second highest waterfall in Serbia. It is located on Stara Planina mountain in southeast Serbia, in Pirot municipality. Kopren height is 103.5 meters, and its altitude is 1,820 meters.

== Jelovarnik ==
Jelovarnik waterfall (Јеловарник); with the reported combined height of 71 or 80 meters in three cascades, it is the third highest waterfall in Serbia. It is located in the Natural Park Kopaonik, on the Kopaonik mountain.

== Pilj ==
Piljski waterfall or Pilj (Пиљски водопад); with the reported heights of 65.5 or 64 meters, is the third highest waterfall in Serbia, discovered in 2002 in the Visok region.

== Čungulj ==
Čunguljski waterfall or Čungulj (Чунгуљски водопад); discovered in 1996 and 43 meters high. It is located in the region of Visok, near the Čungulj peak of the Stara Planina, in the vicinity of the higher Piljski and shorter Kurtuljski waterfalls. It is also known as Čunguljski skok (Čungulj jump)

== Kurtulj ==
Kurtuljski waterfall or Kurtulj (Куртуљски водопад); located in the Visok region, near the Kurtulj peak of the Stara Planina. Close to the higher Čungulj and Pilj waterfalls. It is 27 meters high and also known as Kurtuljski skok (Kurtulj jump).

== Lisine (Veliki Buk) ==
Lisine or Veliki Buk waterfall (Лисине or Велики Бук); located on the Resava River in the east Serbia. It is carved in the karst area, where the sinking river of the Resava springs again from the ground in the canyon-type valley of Sklop. With the height of 25 meters, it was considered the highest waterfall in Serbia until the 1990s when three higher ones were discovered in the Visok region.

== Radavac ==
Radavac waterfall (Радавац); located right after the strong spring of the White Drin which here resurfaces after flowing underground for a while. The spring and the 25 meters high waterfall were protected by the state in 1982.

== Miruša ==
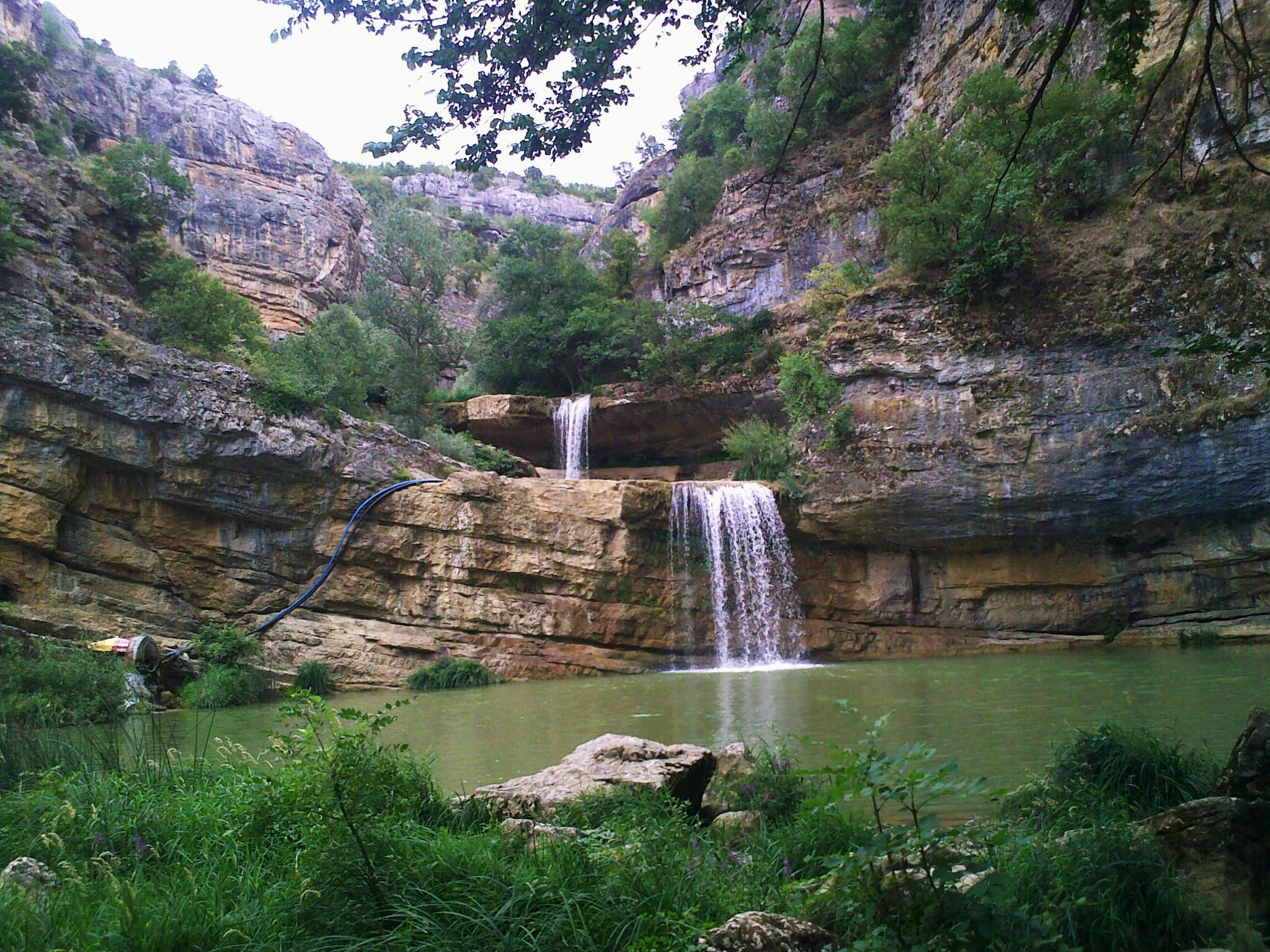
Miruša / Miruša waterfall

Miruša waterfalls (Мируша, Albanian: Mirusha); located on the Miruša river, a tributary to the White Drin, in the Metohija region of Kosovo. The river carved a 10 kilometers long canyon and created 13 river lakes with waterfalls between them, earning the name "Plitvice of Metohija". The highest waterfall, between the sixth and seventh lake, is 22 meters high.

It is next to the hamlet Bublje and town of Mališevo. It is in the Režin Dol valley. Near the hamlet of Kijevski Potok.

== Sopotnica ==
Sopotnica waterfalls (Сопотница); located in the south-western Serbia, near the town of Prijepolje, on the Sopotnica river. Combined height of several cascades is over 20 m (66 ft). Its name is derived from an old Slavic word sopot, meaning strong spring or sudden waterfall (cf. Sopot). The name is onomatopoeic for the sound of running water falling down the cascades ("murmur", modern Serbian šapat, "whisper").

The Sopotnica river springs at an altitude of 1,150 m (3,770 ft) and flows down the slopes of the Jadovnik mountain to 465 m (1,526 ft). The waterfall is loud, especially in spring when the snow melts. During winter, the waterfall partially freezes. The falling of the water begins almost right after the source, over the tufa terraces. The highest section is the Veliki Vodopad ("Big Waterfall"), with 20 m (66 ft). There used to be much higher waterfalls, but local residents exploited the tufa stones during history, destroying waterfalls.

== Skakalo ==
Skakalo waterfall (Скакало); located on the Manastirica river, near the mountain resort of Divčibare on the Mount Maljen, in the west Serbia. It is 20 meters high. The name means "jumping one" in Serbian.

== Izubra ==
Izubra waterfalls' (Изубра); located on the Izubra river, a tributary to the Studenica river, in the south-western Serbia. Three cataracts have a total height of 20 meters. The river was named after zubr, name used for wisent in medieval Serbia.

== Ripaljka ==
Ripaljka waterfall (Рипаљка); located in the central-eastern Serbia, on the Gradašnica river, near the town of Soko Banja. It is 17,5 meters high.

== Veliki Skakavac ==
Veliki Skakavac waterfall (Велики Скакавац); located in the western Serbia, on the Beli Rzav river, on the Tara mountain. It is 15 meters high, and should not be confused with two much higher Skakavac waterfalls in Bosnia and Herzegovina. Its name also means the "jumping one" which is also used as a Serbian name for a grasshopper.

== Tupavica ==
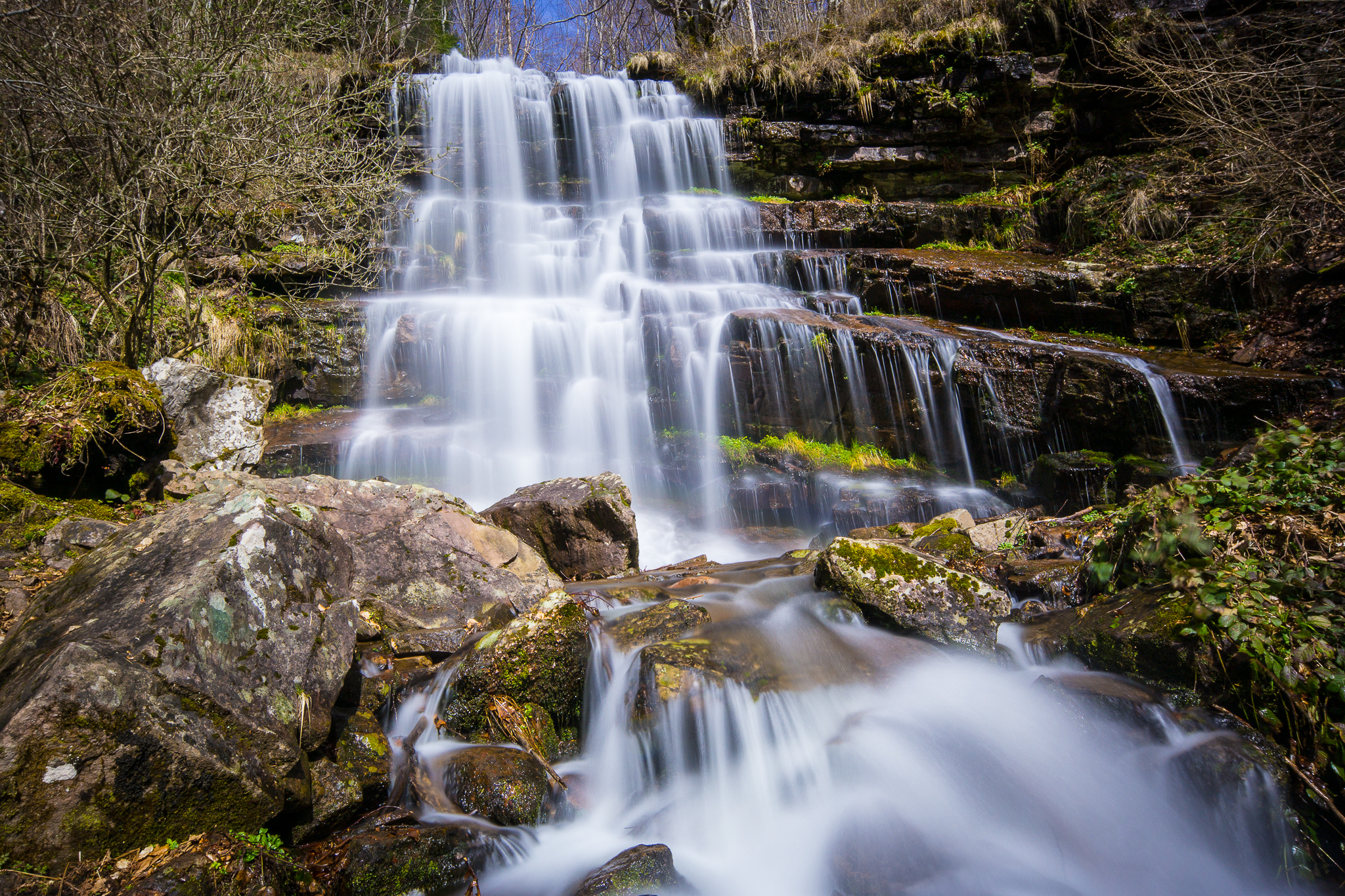
Tupavica Waterfall

Tupavica waterfall (Тупавица); a 15 meters high waterfall in the Visok region, near the village of Dojkince.

== Perućac ==
Perućac waterfall (Перућац); located on the Vrelo river, short (365 meters) but powerful spring in the western Serbia, near the town of Bajina Bašta. It falls for 8 meters into the Drina river and it has been turned into a tourist attraction with a lookout and a restaurant above it.

== See also ==
- List of waterfalls
