= Kopren Waterfall =

- Копренски водопад Koprenski vodopad
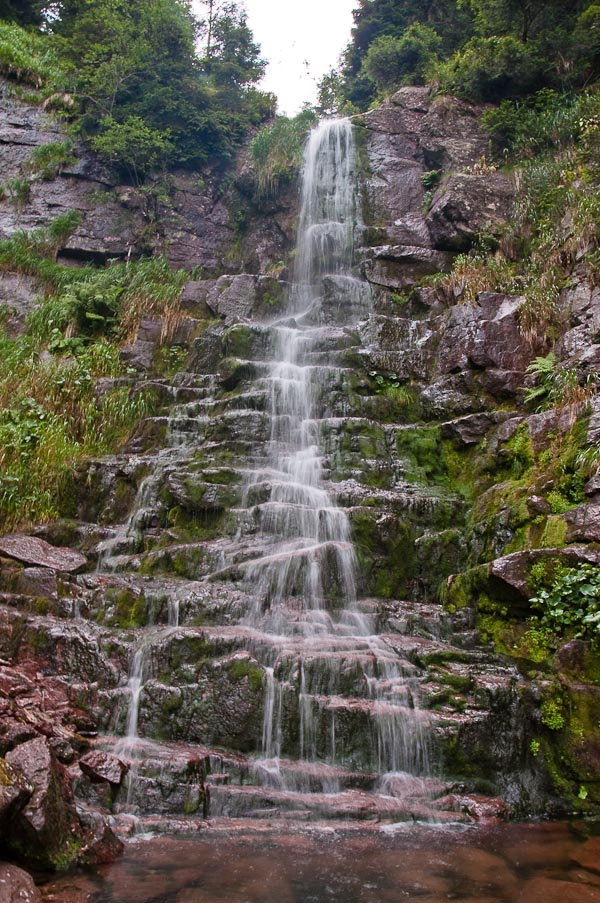
- Kopren waterfall
- Interactive map of Kopren Waterfall
- Location: Dojkinci, City of Pirot, Pirot District, Serbia
- Type: cascade
- Total height: 103.5 m (340 ft)

Kopren Waterfall (Serbian: Копренски водопад, romanized: Koprenski vodopad) is the second highest waterfall in Serbia. It is located on Stara Planina mountain in southeast Serbia and 103.5 m (340 ft) high. Between 16 June 2011, when it was measured, and 9 June 2012, when the waterfall Kaluđerski Skokovi was measured, Kopren was considered the highest waterfall in Serbia.

== Location ==
The Kopren waterfall is situated in the area of the Dojkinci village, northeast of the city of Pirot, to which it administratively belong. The waterfall is located under the Kopren peak of the Stara Planina mountain. The peak is 1,963 m (6,440 ft) high, while the waterfall is at an altitude of 1,820 m (5,970 ft).

== Characteristics ==
The Kopren waterfall is 103.5 m (340 ft) high, 148 m (486 ft) long, with and average inclination of 56,4 degrees. It is located on the stream of Dabidžin potok, not far from its spring. The stream itself is the main headwater of the Jelovička river which flows into the Dojkinička river. The waterfall consists of several cascades, ranging from few to over 40 meters. Some 30 m (98 ft) meters below the lowest cascade, there is another waterfall. It is visually estimated to be 50 to 60 m (160 to 200 ft) tall, but has not been measured yet.

== History ==
The waterfall was discovered in May 2011 by Dragovan Stojadinović. On 16 June 2011 it was measured by Sašа Milanović from the University of Belgrade's Faculty of mining and geology, who measured many other of the highest waterfalls in Serbia. When measured, it was the highest known waterfall in Serbia. On 9 June 2012, the Kaluđerski Skokovi waterfall, also on the Stara Planina was measured to be 232 m (761 ft) high, but Kopren for now remains the waterfall on the highest altitude.

Developments in the recent two decades completely changed the geography of Serbia, when it comes to waterfalls. Area of the Stara Planina has always been sparsely populated and inaccessible because of the rugged and forested terrain, but is also a location of the Serbian-Bulgarian border. When armies relinquished the borders keeping to the police, civilians were allowed to explore the area. As a result, higher and higher waterfalls have been discovered on the Stara Planina since then: Čungulj in 1996 - 43 m (141 ft); Pilj in 2002 - 64 m (210 ft); Kopren in 2011 - 103.5 m (340 ft); Kaluđerski Skokovi in 2012 - 232 m (761 ft).

== See also ==
- List of waterfalls
- List of waterfalls in Serbia
