= Trite Chuki =

Mountain in Bulgaria and Serbia

Trite Chuki / Tri Čuke
- Трите чуки / Три Чуке
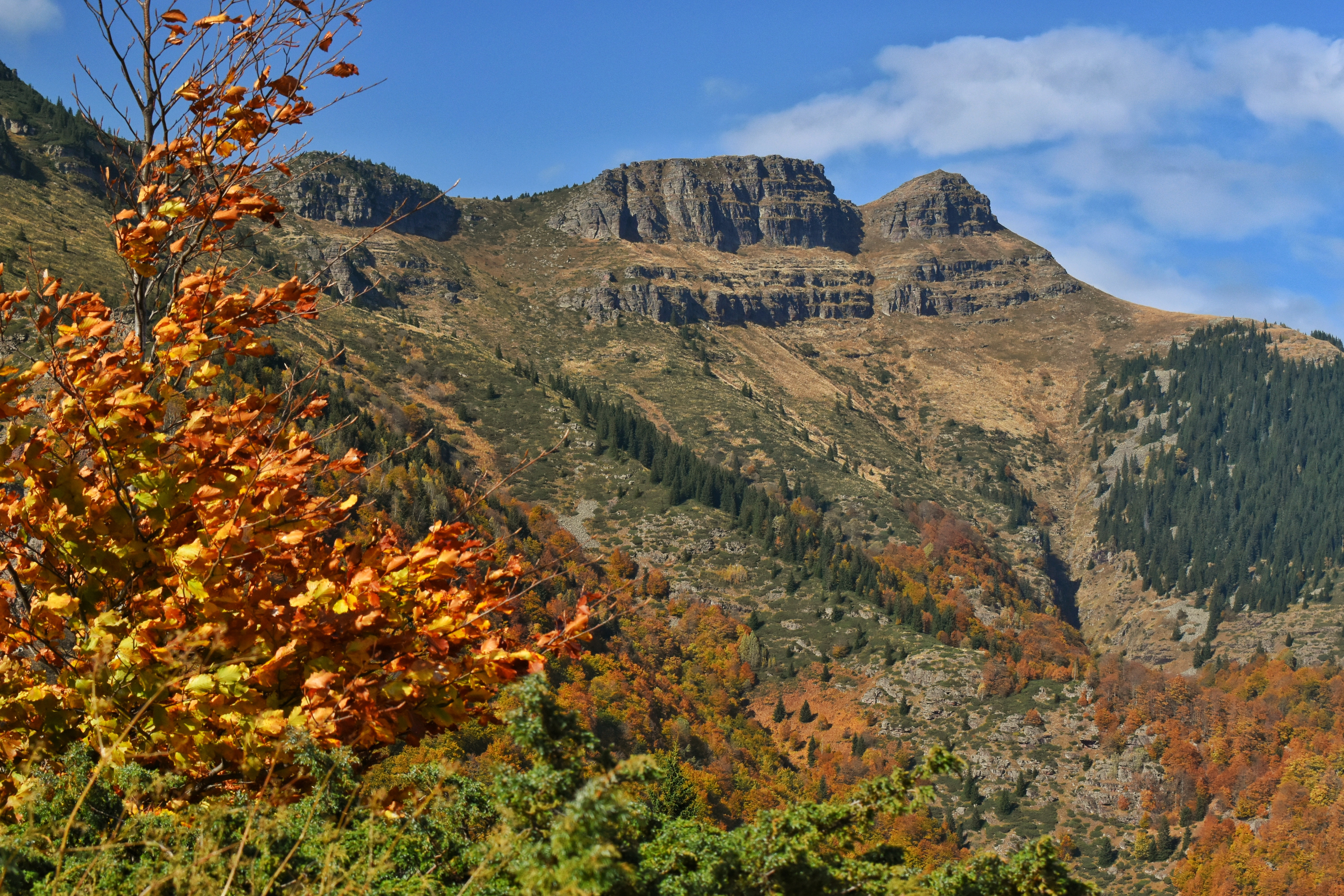
- View from the trail coming from Kopilovtsi, Bulgaria

Highest point
- Elevation: 1,935 m (6,348 ft)
- Coordinates: 43°19′57″N 22°39′24″E

Geography
- Location within Bulgaria
- Countries: Bulgaria, Serbia
- Parent range: Balkan Mountains

Trite Chuki (Bulgarian: Трите чуки, "the three outcrops") or Tri Čuke (Serbian: Три Чуке) is a rocky summit in the western Balkan Mountains, on the border ridge between Bulgaria and Serbia. Trite Chuki is 1,935 m (6,348 ft) high and belongs to the Chiprovtsi Mountain, one of the highest parts of the Balkan Mountains.

The summit's name references its three-headed shape composed by rocky outcrops. Trite Chuki's northeast slopes are very steep and almost vertical. The valleys of the Androvitsa and Grafska rivers originate east of Trite Chuki; the latter feeds the Lanzhin Skok, Voden Skok and Durshin Skok waterfalls. The large Chiprovtsi Waterfall originates to the north of the peak.

The middle outcrop hosts the remains of a basic fortification, reportedly built by Angel Voyvoda and Panayot Hitov in August 1863.

The most common trailheads for ascending Trite Chuki are Kopilovtsi and Chiprovtsi in Bulgaria and Topli Do and Dojkinci in Serbia.
