= Buble =

Buble may refer to:

- Buble, Kosovo, village in Kosovo, also called Bublje
- Michael Bublé (born 1975), Canadian singer

== See also ==
- Bouble, French river
