= Chiprovtsi Monastery =

Orthodox Christian monastery in Bulgaria

Coordinates: 43°24′13.93″N 22°56′2.56″E

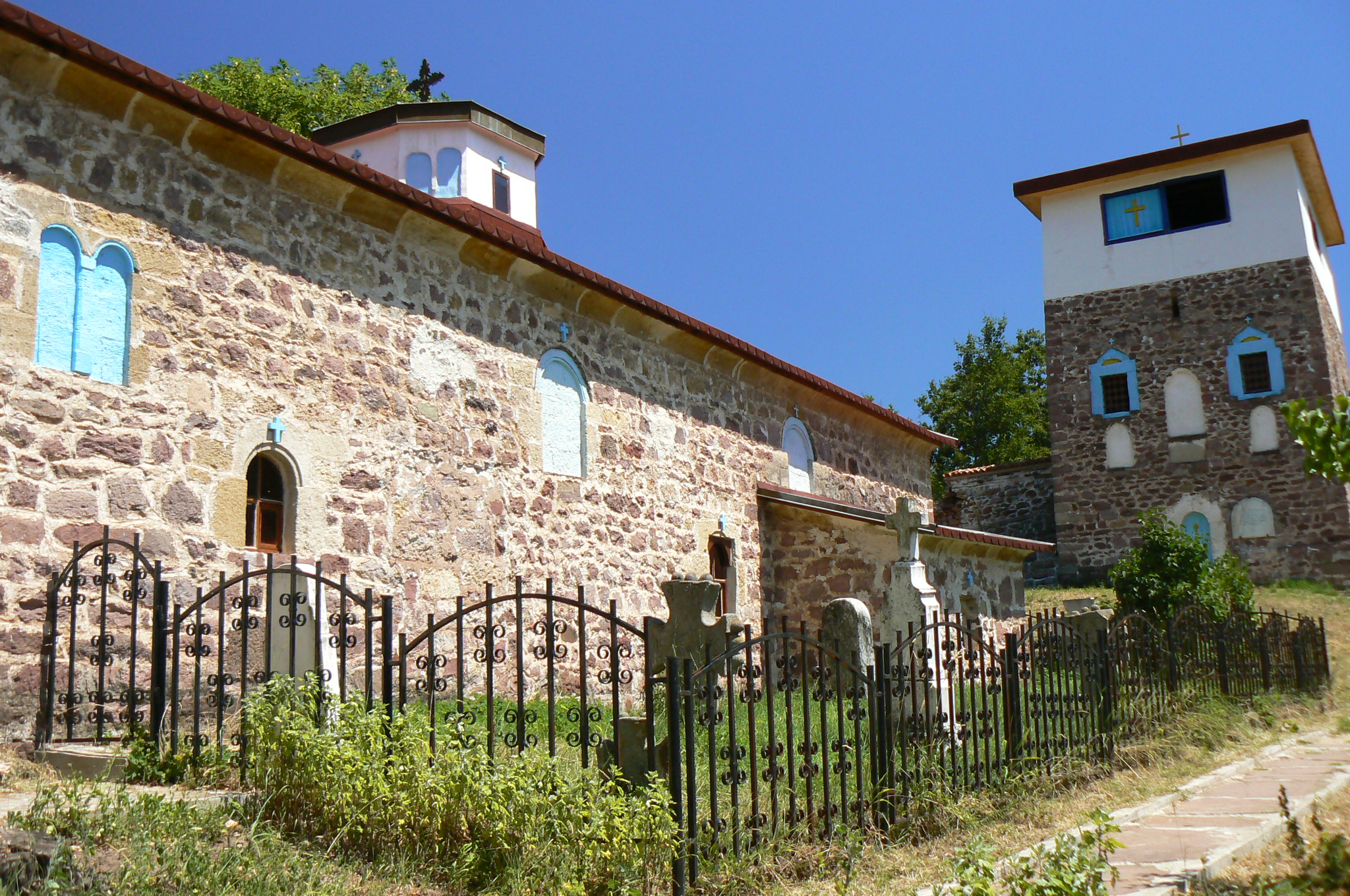
View of the church, the graveyard and the tower

Chiprovtsi Monastery (Bulgarian: Чипровски манастир, Chiprovski manastir) is a Bulgarian Orthodox monastery 5 km (3.1 mi) northeast of the town of Chiprovtsi in Montana Province in northwestern Bulgaria. It belongs to the diocese of Vidin and lies in the valley of the Ogosta river.

According to Petar Bogdan, the monastery was built in the 10th century and remained a religious and cultural centre despite Tatar and Magyar raids in the 13th century, the Ottoman invasion in the 14th century and Michael the Brave's raids in the 16th century. The monastery has been razed six times, in 1412, 1688, 1806, 1828, 1837 and 1876, with the one of 1688 after the Chiprovtsi Uprising being particularly devastating. The current monastery church was built in 1829.

The Chiprovtsi Monastery consists of a church dedicated to Saint John of Rila, residential buildings, a small graveyard and a three-storey tower featuring an ossuary, a chapel and a belfry.
