= Pilj Waterfall =

Waterfall in Serbia

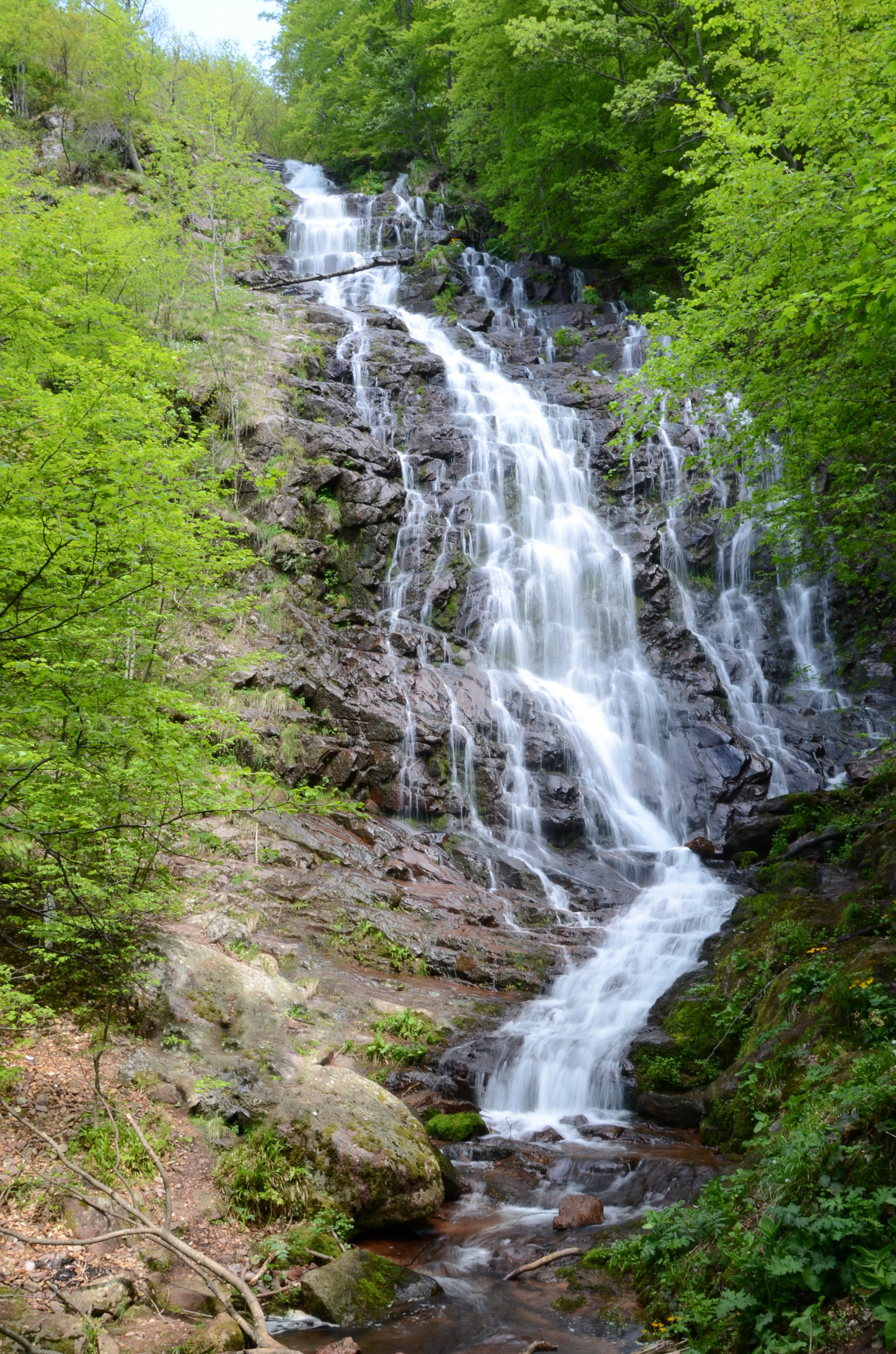
- Pilj Waterfall
- Interactive map of Pilj Waterfall
- Location: near Topli Do, Pirot municipality, Serbia
- Type: cascade
- Total height: 655 m (2,149 ft)

Pilj Waterfall, or simply Pilj (Serbian: Пиљски водопад/Piljski vodopad), is the third-highest waterfall in Serbia. It was discovered by geologists and alpinists only in 2002.

== Location ==
The waterfall is located in the south-eastern region of Visok, near the border of Bulgaria, on the southern slopes of the mountain of Stara Planina. It is located four kilometers away from the village of Topli Do, in the direction of the village of Dojkinci.

== Geography ==
Piljski waterfall is in the gorge of the Piljski stream, the tributary to the Temštica (Toplodolska reka) river, thus this is how the waterfall got its name. It is located under the Stara Planina peaks of Čungulj and Kurtulj and the ridge of Jelenski Skok (deer jump), at the altitude of 1,450 meters above sea level. Height of the Piljski waterfall is given as either 65,5 or 64 meters., which in any case makes it the second highest in the country after the Jelovarnik waterfall on the Kopaonik mountain. The waterfall is a cascade one, with Gornji (Upper, smaller one) and Donji (Lower, taller slope). In the base of the waterfall there is a minute pond, though with a large whirlpool.

The waterfall is located in the sparsely populated area, completely cut off from the rest of the world, without any access roads. As a result of this, the waterfall was discovered only in May 2002. Some other among Serbia's highest waterfalls are in the vicinity of Piljski: Čungulj (43 meters, discovered in 1996) and Kurtulj (27 meters).

== See also ==
- List of waterfalls
- List of waterfalls in Serbia
