= Chiprovtsi =

Chiprovtsi Чипровци
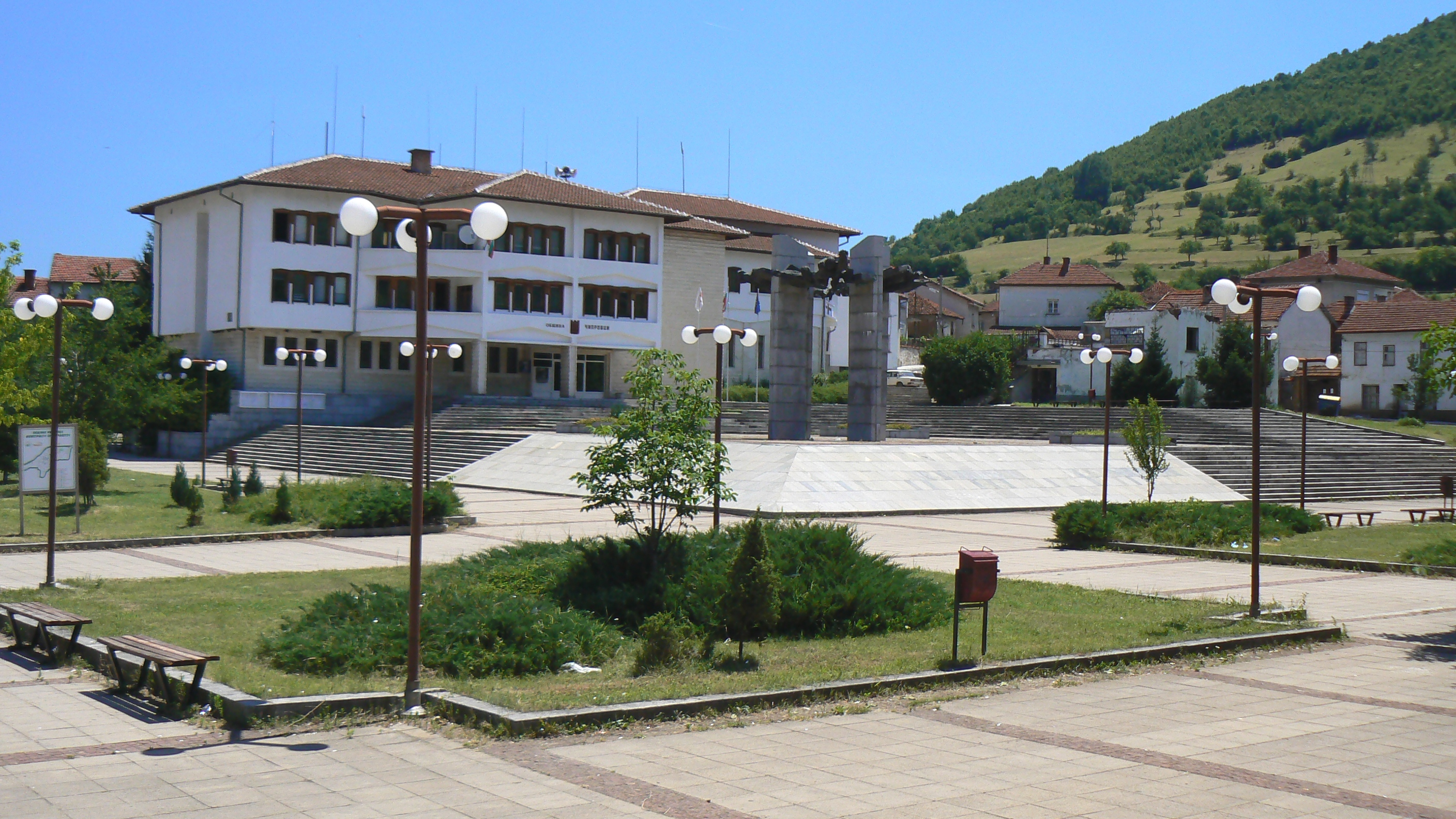
- The central square of Chiprovtsi

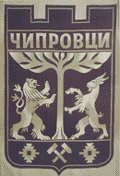
- Coat of arms

- Location of Chiprovtsi
- Coordinates: 43°23′N 22°53′E
- Country: Bulgaria
- Province (oblast): Montana

Government
  - Mayor: Plamen Petkov (GERB)
- Elevation: 550 m (1,800 ft)

Population (15 March 2016)
  - Total: 1,941
- Time zone: UTC+2 (EET)
  - Summer (DST): UTC+3 (EEST)
- Postal Code: 3460
- Area code: 09554
- Website: www.chiprovtzi.hit.bg, www.chiprovtsi.com

Chiprovtsi (Bulgarian: Чипровци, pronounced [ˈtʃiproft͡si]) is a small town in northwestern Bulgaria, administratively part of Montana Province. It lies on the shores of the river Ogosta in the western Balkan Mountains, very close to the Bulgarian-Serbian border. A town of about 2,000 inhabitants, Chiprovtsi is the administrative centre of Chiprovtsi Municipality that also covers nine nearby villages.

Chiprovtsi is thought to have been founded in the Late Middle Ages as a mining and metalsmithing centre. Attracting German ore miners who introduced Roman Catholicism to the area, the town grew in importance as a cultural, economic, and religious centre of the Bulgarian Catholics and the entire Bulgarian northwest during the first few centuries of Ottoman rule. The apogee of this upsurge was the anti-Ottoman Chiprovtsi uprising of 1688. After the suppression of the uprising, some of the town's population fled to Habsburg-ruled lands; those unable to flee were killed or enslaved by the Ottomans.

Deserted for about 30 years, the town was repopulated by Eastern Orthodox Bulgarians, beginning in the 1720s. It was following this new settlement that Chiprovtsi became a major centre of the Bulgarian carpet industry. Other traditional industries have been stock breeding, agriculture and fur trade. The Chiprovtsi municipality experiences a declining population and above-average unemployment. However, the development of alternative tourism helps to sustain the economy.

== Name ==
According to linguist Ivan Duridanov, Chiprovtsi's original name was Kipurovets (Кипуровец). The current form gradually emerged through a sound shift and a syncope. The name is of Slavic origin, but may be linked to the archaic Greek loanword kipos (κήπος, "garden"), a word also borrowed by Serbian. Some researchers derive the toponym from the personal name Kipra or Kipro, implying beauty and sprightliness. Another popular hypothesis, although rejected by Duridanov, links the name to Latin cuprum ("copper") due to the numerous copper deposits and mines in the region in Ancient Roman times.

The name was first mentioned in a western source, namely a Latin document of 1565, as Chiprovatz. Similar forms such as Chipurovatz, Chiprouvatz, Chiprovotzii, Chiprovtzi, Kiprovazo, Chiprovatzium, Kiprovetz and Kiprovtzi have been used throughout the 16th–17th centuries. The attested Serbo-Croatian pronunciation of the suffix /at͡s/ as opposed to standard Bulgarian /ɛt͡s/ is explained with the influence of the so-called "Illyrian language", a Dalmatian form of Croatian language used by the Franciscan clerics in the town in the 17th century.

The town has been conventionally divided into several neighbourhoods (ma(h)ali); most are named according to the profession and social status of their residents. In 1888, D. Marinov recorded the existence of the Srebril or Srebrana ("Silversmiths'"), Kyurkchiyska ("Furriers'"), Pazarska ("Merchants'"), Tabashka ("Leatherworkers'"), Partsal and Trap neighbourhoods. The existence of a Saksonska (Regio Saxonium, "Saxon") neighbourhood was also attested until the 17th century. Another actively used pair of toponyms is Dolni kray ("Lower Part") and Gorni kray ("Upper Part"), referring to the town neighbourhoods closer to the river or the mountain respectively.

Chiprovtsi Point and Chiprovtsi Islets in Rugged Island in the South Shetland Islands, Antarctica, are named after Chiprovtsi.

== Geography ==
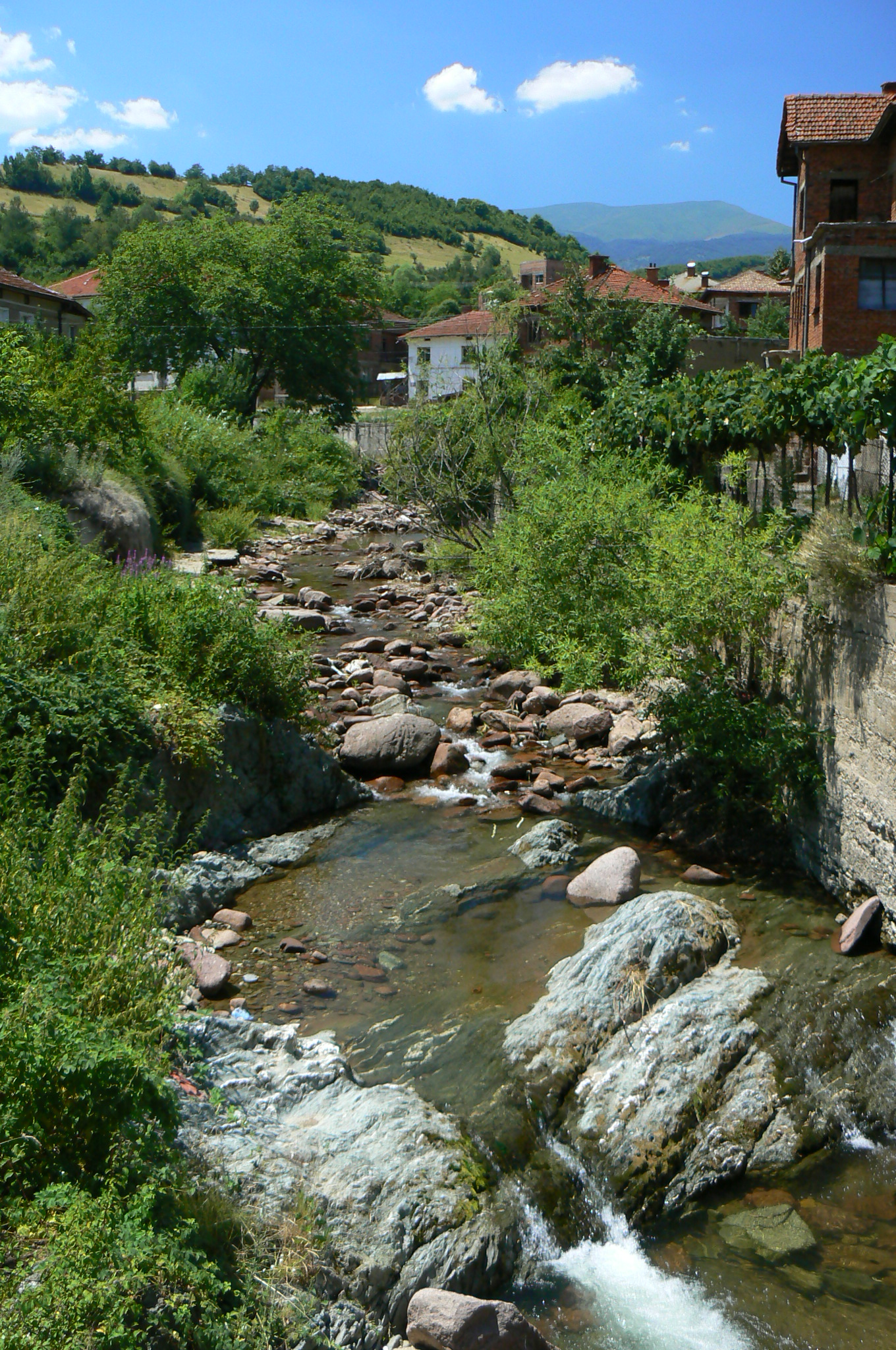
The Ogosta flowing through Chiprovtsi in its upper course

Chiprovtsi is situated in a small valley at the foot of the Chiprovtsi Mountain, a high northern branch of the western Balkan Mountains. The Chiprovtsi Mountain forms the border between Bulgaria and the neighbouring Serbia. It is 35 kilometres (22 mi) long and features several peaks around 2,000 metres (6,600 ft), including Midzhur (2,168 m or 7,113 ft), Martinova Chuka (2,011 m or 6,598 ft), Golyama Chuka (1,967 m or 6,453 ft), Kopren (1,964 m or 6,444 ft), Tri Chuki (1,938 m or 6,358 ft) and Vrazha Glava (1,936 m or 6,352 ft). The Ogosta River, a right tributary of the Danube, originates from the Chiprovtsi Mountain and flows northeast through the Danubian Plain to join the Danube in Vratsa Province. Just northeast of the town is another mountain, Shiroka Planina, a branch of the Fore-Balkan Mountains. The region is rich in metal and mineral deposits.

== Demographics ==
On 31 July 2005, Chiprovtsi's population was 2,375 people — 1,167 men and 1,208 women. By June 2008, the town's population had declined to 2,122.

== History ==
=== Antiquity and Middle Ages ===
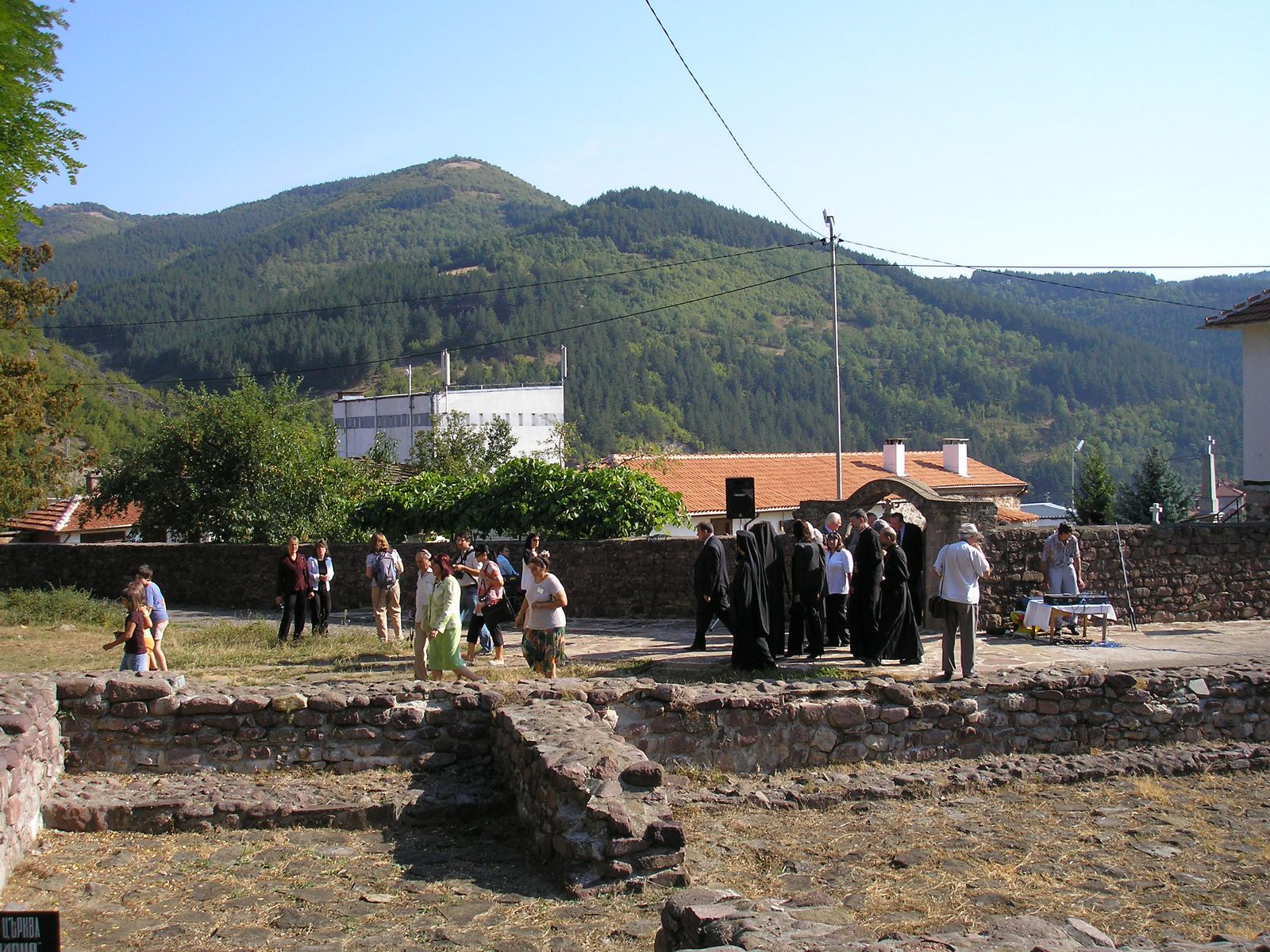
Ruins of the 15th-century Roman Catholic Cathedral of Saint Mary

It is known that the area around Chiprovtsi has been inhabited since the time of the Thracians and later the Roman Empire, when the local metal deposits were exploited. According to historian V. Velkov, the valley of the Ogosta was inhabited by Thracians since the early 1st millennium BC. According to ancient accounts, the area was populated by the Thracian tribe of the Triballi or a related group of Thracians. The Romans conquered what is today the Bulgarian northwest after 29 BC and consolidated their authority in the region under Emperor Trajan (98–117). There are remains of Roman fortifications around Chiprovtsi, such as the Latin Fortress ruins in the Kula area, where coins dating to the reigns of Marcus Aurelius (161–180) and Commodus (180–192) have been unearthed, and the Big Ruins south of the town. The gold, silver, lead, copper and iron mines brought sizable revenue to the Romans, who took good care to protect these from barbarian attacks.

With the arrival of the Seven Slavic tribes and the Bulgars in the 6th–7th century and the establishment of the First Bulgarian Empire in 680 in the former lands of the Eastern Roman Empire (Byzantine Empire), the entire region was soon incorporated into the Bulgarian realm. After a period of renewed Byzantine rule in 1018–1185, it was part of the Second Bulgarian Empire until its conquest by the Ottomans in the late 14th or early 15th century.

The presence of the German ore miners, known locally as sasi (саси, Saxons), cannot be accurately dated. Some researchers estimate their arrival in Chiprovtsi to be in the mid-14th century, the time of the last Bulgarian emperors, while others claim they reached the town during the early Ottoman rule of Bulgaria. Their exact number and place of origin are also vague, although the German miners were widely recruited as specialists in medieval Wallachia, Transylvania and Serbia. In Chiprovtsi, they are thought to have arrived as a single group of about 50–60 people with their families. They were probably recruited through special contracts and likely received some privileges compared to the native Bulgarian population. In Chiprovtsi's mines, they served as technicians and overseers, contributing to the technological progress of mining in the region. They were, however, gradually assimilated by the local Bulgarians by the mid-15th century, as indicated by German names with Slavic suffixes in the population registers. The Germans left behind the name of one of the neighbourhoods, still known as the "Saxon" neighbourhood in the 17th century, and Roman Catholicism as the dominant religion in the town.

In the second half of the 14th century, a certain number of Bosnian Croats and Ragusan merchants arrived in Chiprovtsi and its surroundings, accompanied by some Franciscan clerics from Catholic Franciscan province of Silver Bosnia. According to the research of Croatian historian Vitomir Belaj, the Catholic Franciscans had arrived from medieval Bosnia in western Bulgaria at the time of Bosnian vicar Bartul Alvernski ("Bartholomew of Alverno"), who himself originated from Italy, in 1366. Among the newcoming settlers there were some noblemen as well. According to Belaj, these included members of the Parchevich family, the ancestral house of the Peyachevich family.

=== Early Ottoman rule ===
As the Ottomans subjugated the Balkans in the 14th–15th centuries, they valued the Chiprovtsi mines for their military and civil needs and sought to renew the ore extraction that had been interrupted by warfare. Renewed exploitation of the local deposits is thought to have commenced by the late 15th century; a note of 1479 mentions that the mines "in Bosnia, Herzegovina and other places" had been rented.

The town of Chiprovtsi and several of the surrounding villages were administratively organized as a hass, or a private possession of the sultan's royal family and later of the sultan's mother. The special status of the area meant that the local Christians would not be subject to the usual discriminatory laws, but would have to pay an annual tribute of silver to the sultan. Later on, the estate was organized as a waqf, a land devoted for Muslim religious or charitable purposes. Chiprovtsi and the region were inhabited exclusively by Christians and they had the privilege to perform their rituals in public without discrimination. The only Turkish person in the town was the sultan's representative and no Turks were allowed to settle there, as the local Bulgarians enjoyed self-government to a certain degree and were administered by an elected council of eminent Bulgarian residents (knezove). A fragment of the area's pre-Ottoman Bulgarian administrative division may have also been preserved, as it is referred to under the Slavic name voivodeship in some documents.

Catholic population of Chiprovtsi and the related villages
Year	Population	Source
1577	2,000	anonymous
1585	300 families (including Orthodox)	Ottoman account
1624	2,600	Pietro Masarechi
1640	4,430	Bakshev
1647	4,000	Bakshev
1649	3,800	Bakshev
1653	3,660	Bakshev
1658	3,640	Bakshev
1666	550 families (including Orthodox)	Ottoman account
1667	4,140	Bakshev
1670	4,140	Bakshev
1679	4,270	Knezhevich

By the 1520s, Chiprovtsi was still a minor centre of mining activity compared to other places in the empire. In that period, it brought a revenue of 47,553 akçe, as compared to Kratovo's 100,000 and Srebrenica's 477,000. The Catholic miners are known to have arrived by that time, as the Catholic Church of Saint Mary had been built around 1487, but it was not until the years after the 1520s that Chiprovtsi attracted more colonists and turned into one of the Ottoman Empire's leading mining centres. By 1528, Chiprovtsi had a mint and was manufacturing silver coins. In 1585, the miners were forced to work night and day and had to pay increased taxes, leading to protests and the danger that they may migrate. By the time, Chiprovtsi was already providing a revenue of 1,400,000 akçe, making it one of the empire's prime mining and metalworking regions.

In the mid-16th century, Chiprovtsi began to attract the attention of Catholic officials from Rome. In 1565, the archbishop of Antivari (today Bar, Montenegro) Ambrosius arrived in the town as an apostolic visitor. In 1592–1595, the Bosnian Croat cleric Peter Solinat and a group of Franciscans established a Catholic mission in the town. In 1601, Solinat was appointed bishop of Sofia with his seat in Chiprovtsi by Pope Clement VIII. He chose to reside in Chiprovtsi because Sofia's Catholic population was limited to a handful of Ragusan merchant families.

=== Cultural heyday ===
Chiprovtsi's development reached its apogee in the 17th century, when it became a bustling cultural, religious and merchant centre of that part of the Balkans. Named the "flower of Bulgaria" in that period, some have deemed the town's prosperity the Balkans' only participation in the Renaissance, along with that of Dalmatia. Many members of the local élite were educated in Rome, particularly at the Collegio Clementino and the Sapienza University. Gradually, the foreign Franciscans were replaced by locals and in the 1620s the Bulgarian Catholics formed a separate autonomous entity directly subordinate to the Pope, the Bulgarian Custody. Solinat was succeeded by a Bulgarian bishop, Iliya Marinov of Chiprovtsi, who was in turn followed by another local, Petar Bogdan Bakshev, who travelled to Wallachia, Warsaw, Vienna, Rome and Ancona looking for funds and support for the community. In the 1640s, the Bulgarian Custody gave way to the Diocese of Marcianopolis presided by Petar Parchevich and the Diocese of Nicopoli headed by Filip Stanislavov and represented in Chiprovtsi by Franchesko Soymirovich. The town and the surrounding areas were not entirely Catholic: a significant part of the population was Orthodox; the Orthodox Chiprovtsi Monastery still exists today.

The evolution of Chiprovtsi from a mining town to a trade hub owes much to the settlement of merchants from the Republic of Ragusa (today Dubrovnik, Croatia) and the quality of the local metalworking, as well as the lack of permanent Ottoman presence and the privileges enjoyed by the population. By the mid-17th century, mining was in decline, as the silver deposits had been all but exhausted (in 1666 there remained only 16 iron smelteries), forcing the population to seek a more profitable occupation. Since 1659, the Ragusan merchants from Provadiya altered their traditional route to Dubrovnik through Sofia in order to visit Chiprovtsi. The local residents produced and traded with leather, carpets, fabrics, clothes, remarkable gold and silver jewellery, metal tools, cattle, etc. Initially, the Chiprovtsi merchants would only visit Vidin, Pirot, Sofia and Vratsa. Later, however, they appeared at the markets in Istanbul, Thessaloniki, Bucharest, Odessa, Braşov, Sibiu, Belgrade, Buda and Pest, with a particularly strong presence in Wallachia and Transylvania, where they established permanent agencies and sizable companies in Târgoviște, Câmpulung and Râmnic during the rule of Matei Basarab (1632–1654). The international trade broadened the outlook of the locals and introduced the ideas of the age and the European culture of the time to the region.

A Catholic monastery was built during the time of Peter Solinat and developed as an educational centre through its school; it was referred to as one of the most prestigious schools in the Bulgarian lands in that period. The school was partially foreign-funded and provided education in grammar, arithmetic, logic and philosophy to 75–80 students. The teachers were often Bulgarian graduates of the Collegio Clementino in Rome and the languages of education were Latin, Bulgarian and "Illyrian", a Croatian form written usually in the Latin alphabet but sometimes in Cyrillic. The school also had a library, one of the first in Bulgaria. Since the 1630s, the eminent writers and translators from Chiprovtsi, most notably Petar Bogdan Bakshev and Petar Parchevich, formed the so-called "Chiprovtsi Literary School", issuing books about the history of Bulgaria, as well as on religious topics.

=== Chiprovtsi uprising ===
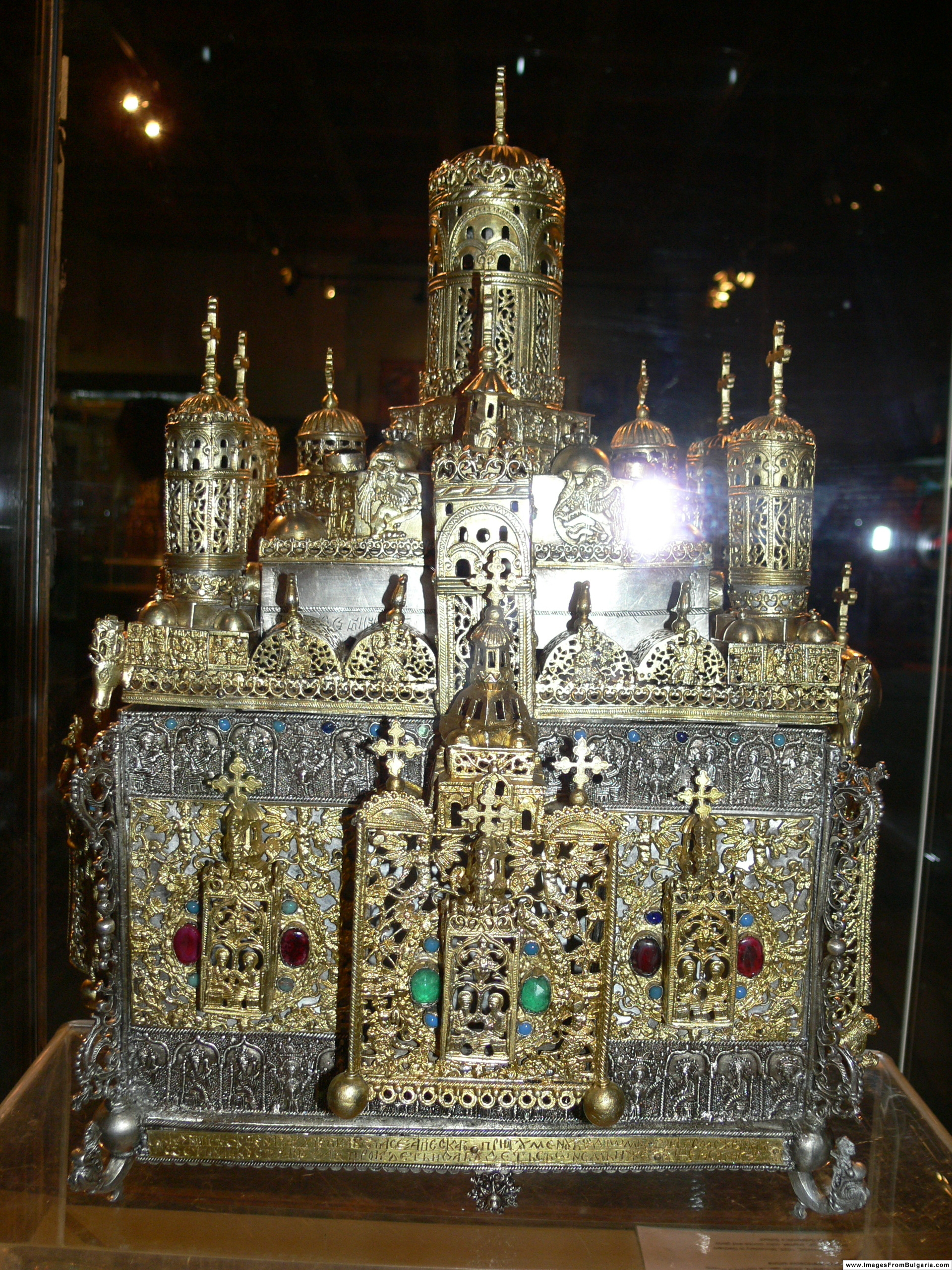
A work of the Chiprovtsi goldsmithing school (17th century), National Historical Museum of Bulgaria

As prosperous as the region was, it was not unharmed by the constant Ottoman–Habsburg wars and was often the target of Turkish, Tatar and Hungarian rebel raids. By the 1630s, the idea of an organized anti-Ottoman revolt had reached the town of Chiprovtsi. In his 1650 account to the senate of the Republic of Venice Petar Parchevich described the long preparations for an armed struggle and the support-seeking visits of his fellow townsmen to the kings of Poland and Austria. Since then, the inhabitants of Chiprovtsi waited for the suitable moment when they would be able to instigate an effective uprising and continued to co-operate with the leaders of the European realms.

On 12 September 1683, the Ottomans were routed by the forces of Europe at the Battle of Vienna. In early 1684, Austria, Poland and Venice concluded an anti-Ottoman pact; they were joined by Russia in 1686 to form the Holy League. It was clear at that time that the decisive moment was near. The leaders of Chiprovtsi assessed that after the imminent capture of Belgrade by the League in 1688 their European allies would reach Sofia and end the Ottoman rule of Bulgaria. Thus, they revolted in the spring of 1688. The reach of the uprising cannot be exactly determined, but scholars such as S. Damyanov believe it included Chiprovtsi and the neighbouring Kopilovtsi, Klisura and Zhelezna and thousands of Bulgarians from the entire Bulgarian northwest. Although the leaders were mostly Catholics, the bulk of the insurgents were Orthodox. It is known that the rebellion was led by over 200 voivodes of separate detachments. The insurgents were aided by six regiments of regular Habsburg army and artillery under General Heißler and managed to briefly capture the town of Kutlovitsa (modern Montana), but were ultimately crushed by the Ottomans and their Hungarian ally Imre Thököly. On 18–19 October, the Ottomans stormed Chiprovtsi and retook it from the rebels, capturing over 2,000 people. About 3,000 natives of the area, guarded by the remaining insurrectionary units, managed to flee beyond the Danube. Most of those settled in the Habsburg-ruled realms, founding a major Bulgarian colony in the Banat known as the "Banat Bulgarians", as well as colonies in Deva and Alvinc (Vinţu de Jos) in Transylvania and Szentendre in modern Hungary. The town itself was plundered, burned down and deserted and its links to the West were largely severed.

=== Repopulation and modern times ===
For several decades after the uprising, Chiprovtsi and the region remained desolate. In 1699, the Ottomans attempted to settle 1,238 anti-Habsburg Hungarian rebels in those lands and provided them with 5-year tax exemptions, but this proved unsuccessful as in 1717 the same Hungarians were moved to the Rousse barracks and sent to fight at Niš.

Ultimately, the region was repopulated by Orthodox Bulgarians, beginning in the 1720s. In 1737–1738, the sultan amnestied the rebels and permitted the return of the insurgents' property in 1741, though none of the former residents is known to have returned. In the 1720s–1730s, Chiprovtsi had only 12 inhabited houses; by the 1750s, those had reached 150. The Orthodox Chiprovtsi Monastery had been reestablished in 1703 by a certain Zhivko who took the ecclesiastical name of Zoticus. As the interrupted mining was apparently not continued after the uprising and the international trade links had been severed, the locals switched to cattle breeding, agriculture, fur trade and later carpet weaving as their main occupation.

The western traveller Ami Boué, who visited the town in 1836–1838, reported that "mainly young girls, under shelters or in corridors, engage in carpet weaving. They earn only five francs a month and the payment was even lower before". By 1868, the annual production of carpets in Chiprovtsi had surpassed 14,000 square metres. Following the Russo-Turkish War in 1877–1878, Chiprovtsi, along with all of northern Bulgaria and the region around Sofia, became part of the newly liberated Principality of Bulgaria, the predecessor of modern Bulgaria. In 1896, almost 1,400 women from Chiprovtsi and the region were engaged in carpet weaving. In 1920, the locals founded the Manual Labour carpet-weaving cooperative society, the first of its kind in the country.

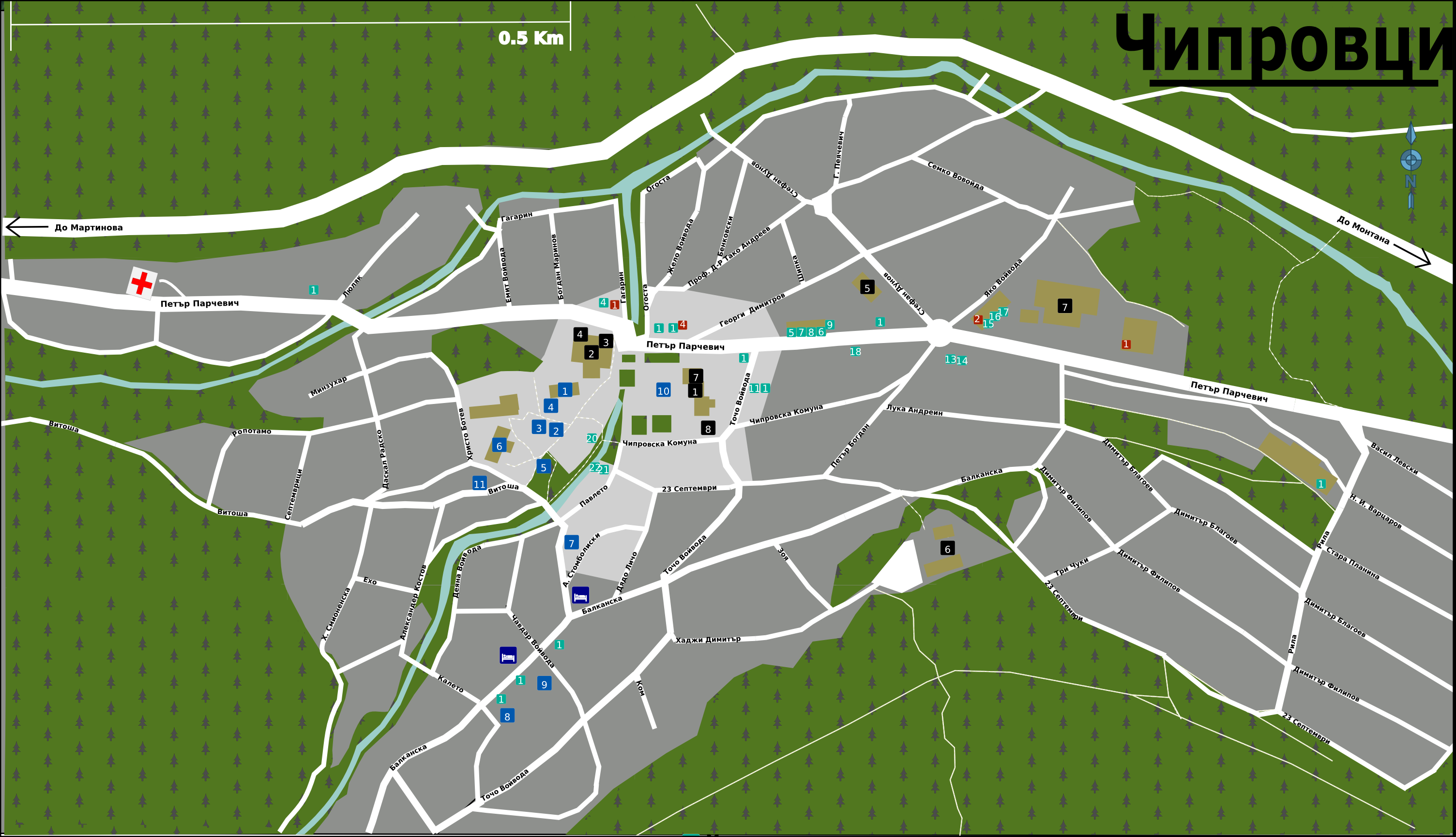
Chiprovtsi Bulgaria Street Map

In the 1950s, ore output was renewed in the region, briefly revitalizing Chiprovtsi through the influx of young and highly educated people. On 12 September 1968, Chiprovtsi was officially proclaimed a town by the National Assembly of Bulgaria. In Socialist times, the town had a factory that produced AK-47 magazines and employed about 400 people. After the democratic changes in 1989, mining was discontinued again due to a lack of funds, the factory was closed and the carpet industry has been in decline as it had lost its firm foreign markets. As a result, the town and the municipality have been experiencing a demographic crisis.

== Governance, education and economy ==
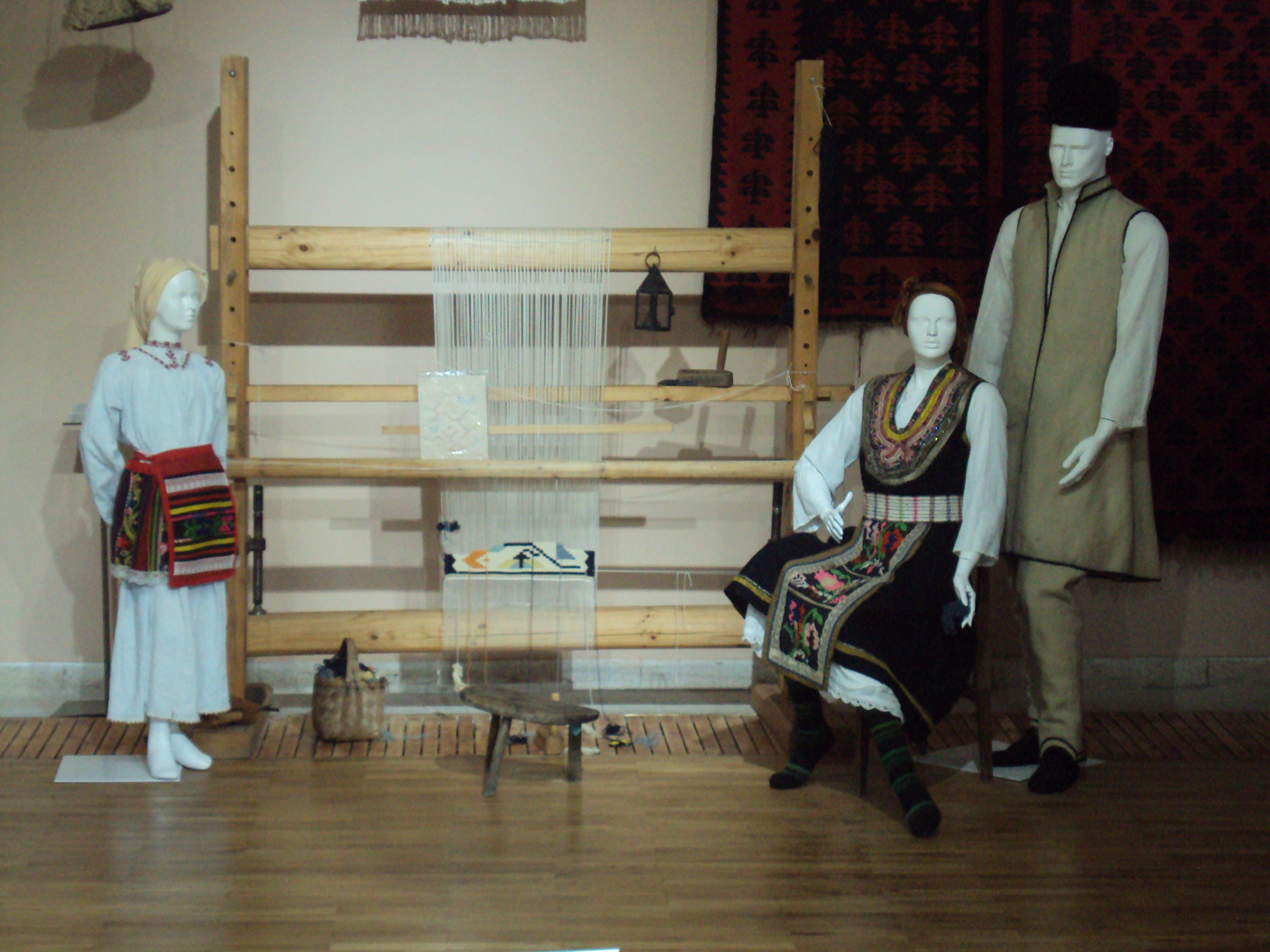
Chiprovtsi carpet making; Chiprovtsi Museum of History

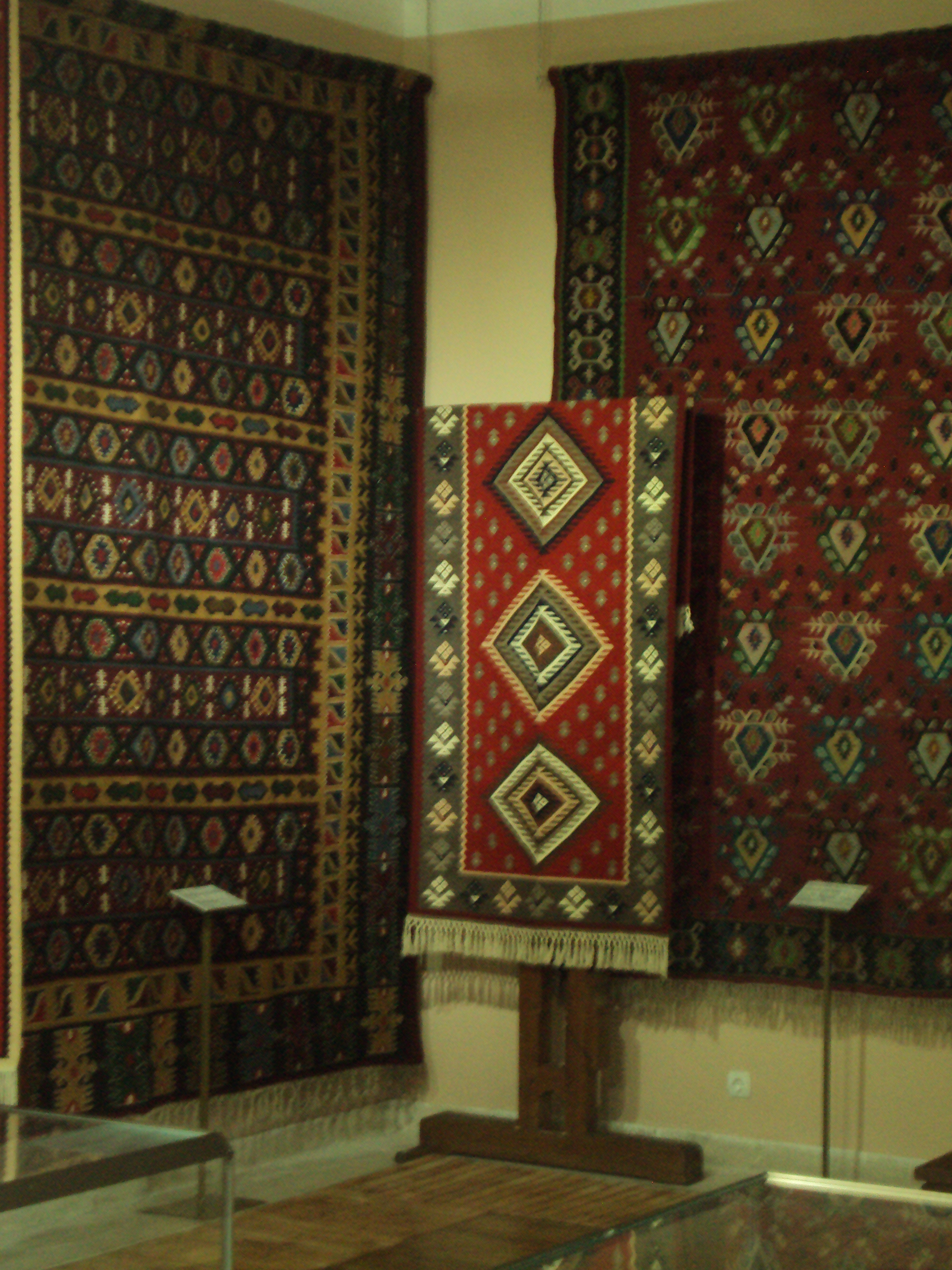
Samples of traditional local carpets

The municipal government consists of a mayor (kmet), a deputy mayor and a secretary. Since 2007, the municipality has been governed by Zaharin Ivanov Zamfirov of Bulgarian Agrarian People's Union "Aleksandar Stamboliyski" who won the municipal elections with 1,615 votes or 62.67% against Antoaneta Todorova Kostova of the Bulgarian Socialist Party who amassed 962 votes or 37.33%. Two villages in the municipality are eligible to elect their own mayor, Prevala and Zhelezna.

The municipal administration is divided into two branches, the common and specialized administration. The common administration is further divided into the "Information Services" and "Financial-economical Activities and Handling of Property" departments; the specialized administration includes the "Planning and Distribution of the Budget" and "Territorial and Village Planning and Building" departments. The municipality has no separate court or prosecutor's office and is instead serviced by the Montana provincial court and office. The local police station is subordinate to the one in Montana. There is a Municipal Land Commission, part of the Ministry of Agriculture and Forestry, and a Municipal Social Service. The Municipal Land Commission takes care of land and forest distribution and the Municipal Social Service oversees financial aid and supports the disabled.

The town has a primary school (grades 1–4) and a high school (grades 4–12); both claim to be successors of the school founded in 1624. The two schools service the entire municipality, as the six schools in the larger villages have been closed. In 1977, the high school was visited by about 600 students; the number slightly declined to 400 in 1989. In 2008, it was only visited by 142 children. Chiprovtsi's kindergarten is the only one remaining in the municipality of formerly 15.

The carpet (kilim) industry remains dominant in the town. Carpets have been crafted according to traditional designs, but in recent years it is up to the customers to decide the pattern of the carpet they have ordered. The production of a single 3 by 4 m (9.8 by 13.1 ft) carpet takes about 50 days; primarily women engage in carpet weaving. Work is entirely manual and all used materials are natural; the primary material is wool, coloured using plant or mineral dyes. The local carpets have been prized at exhibitions in London, Paris, Liège and Brussels. The kilim making of Chiprovtsi was inscribed on the Intangible Cultural Heritage list of UNESCO in 2014. The municipality has also invested in the development of tourism and many private houses have been turned into small family hotels or guesthouses. In 2004, 65 people were engaged in the tourism industry; in the same year, the municipality was visited by 2,350 tourists, of whom were 254 foreigners. In terms of economic indicators, the municipality ranks around the high average: it is 113th of 264 municipalities in Bulgaria by GDP per capita and 67th by Human Development Index.

In September 2008, it was reported that one of the few fluorite deposits in Europe located near Chiprovtsi would be developed by a Bulgarian company that had leased the mine for 20 years. The company has invested BGN 14.5 million and aims to extract 150,000 tonnes of raw material and produce 50,000 tonnes of pure fluorite a year. As of 2008, the company employs 73 miners, all former workers in the closed local mines, and expects their number to reach 150. In 2016, the mines were closed, as the deposits were almost exhausted and the market conditions of fluorit also became unfavorable. At this point, the company employed 116 people, who were let go.

== Culture and religion ==
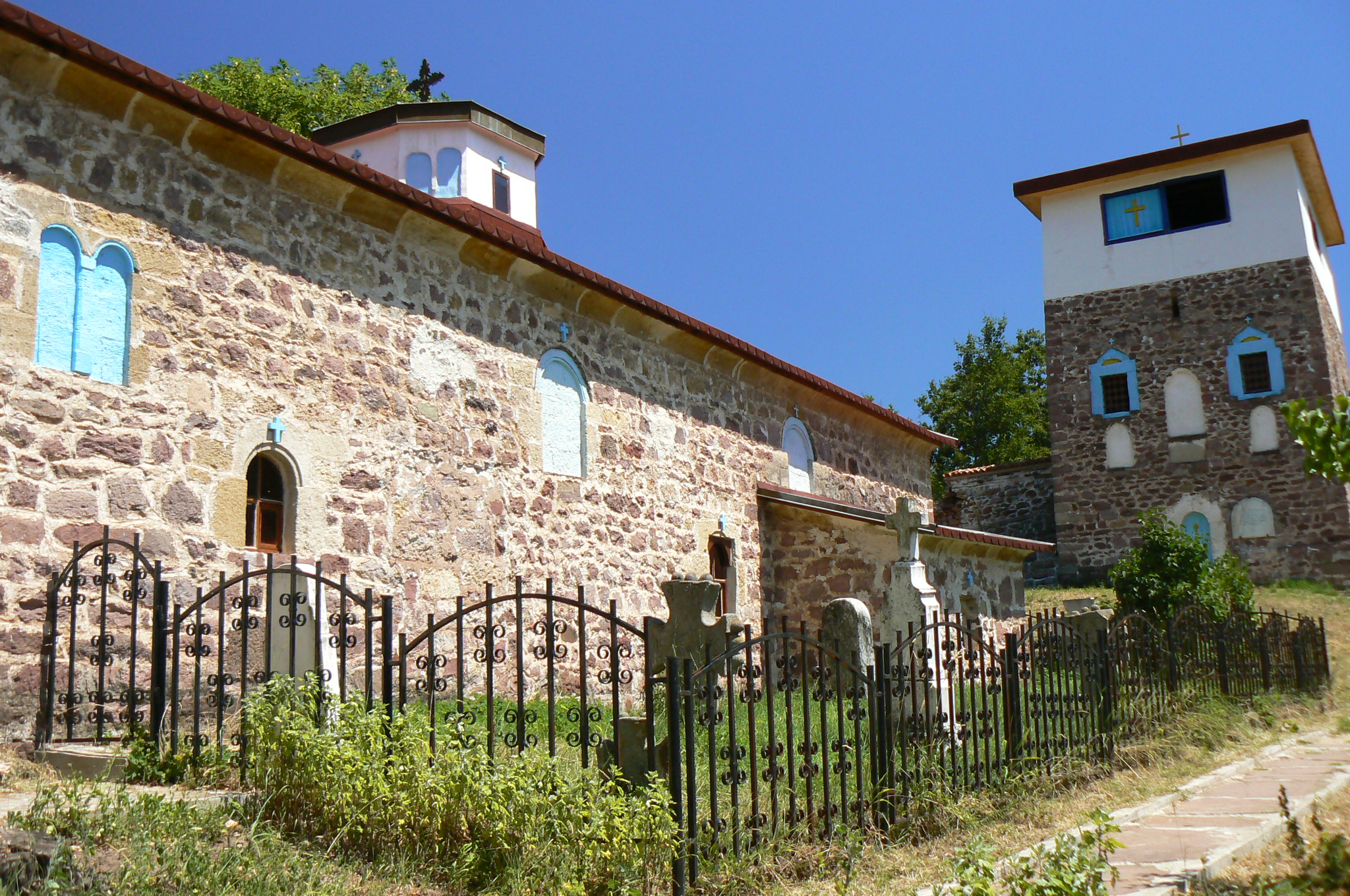
The Bulgarian Orthodox Chiprovtsi Monastery

The local Bulgarians traditionally belong to the ethnographic group of the Torlaks and speak a transitional Bulgarian dialect, the Belogradchik dialect. Most of the population are adherents of the Bulgarian Orthodox Church. The municipality has 30 registered cultural monuments and 12 consecrated stone crosses, of which eight in Chiprovtsi. Such crosses are typical for the Bulgarian northwest and each is dedicated to a saint: they serve both demarcating and religious purposes. Most of the crosses are not dated, with the notable exceptions of Saint Demetrius—1755, Saints Peter and Paul—1781 and Holy Mother of God—1874.

A notable cultural trait of Chiprovtsi shared with much of the region is the veneration of a family patron saint, named svetets ("saint") and akin to Serbian slava. The practice exists since time immemorial and the family saint is thought to have been chosen by the taking of a random candle by an unaware person. The svetets is associated to the family house: when a daughter-in-law comes to live there, she accepts the family saint of the home, and when a family member or a foreign settler moves out or builds a new house, they adopt a new svetets.

Chiprovtsi has a museum of history that occupies two old-style buildings and features four exhibitions. These present the domestic life from Antiquity through the Middle Ages and the 17th-century heyday until today, as well as works of the Chiprovtsi goldsmithing and carpet industry. The town has an Eastern Orthodox church dedicated to the Ascension of Jesus; the remains of the old Roman Catholic church of Saint Mary have also been preserved. The Chiprovtsi Monastery is situated outside the town; there are ruins of several other Orthodox churches and another monastery.

The town has a community cultural centre (chitalishte) with branches in eight of the villages in the municipality. The chitalishte has a youth dancing group, a folk music group, a theatrical group, a folk ritual and customs reproduction group and other similar groups. The nine libraries of the Chiprovtsi chitalishte and its branches house 65,975 volumes of books.

== Notable people ==
- Kamelia, pop-folk singer
