= Asenovo, Pleven Province =

Asenovo Асеново
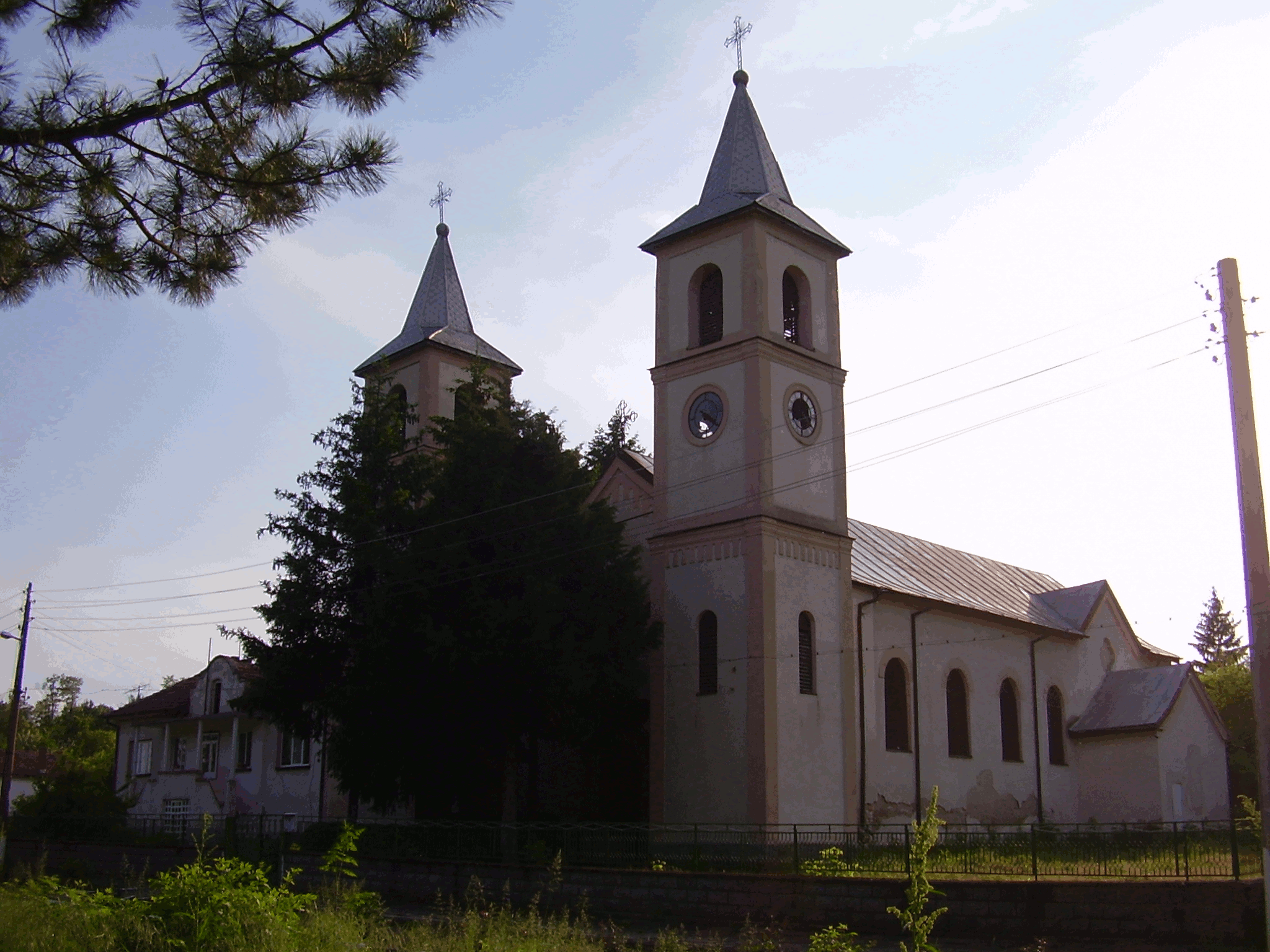
- The Roman Catholic Church of the Holy Trinity in Asenovo

- Asenovo
- Coordinates: 43°33′13″N 24°51′54″E
- Country: Bulgaria
- Province (Oblast): Pleven
- Elevation: 130 m (430 ft)

Population (2010)
  - Total: 267
- Time zone: UTC+2 (EET)
  - Summer (DST): UTC+3 (EEST)
- Postal Code: 5957
- Area code: 06540

Asenovo (Bulgarian: Асеново [ɐˈsɛnovo]) is a village in northern Bulgaria, and part of Nikopol municipality, Pleven Province. It was founded in 1892 by 203 Roman Catholic households of Banat Bulgarians returning to Bulgaria from the Banat. They came mainly from the village of Vinga, but also from Dudeștii Vechi (Stár Bišnov), Konak and Breștea (Brešća).

The village is located 24 km from Nikopol and 28 km from Pleven, on the main road between the two towns. It has an area of about 1.36 km^{2}. Asenovo's design features straight, narrow streets and 12,000 m^{2} lots, each divided in four 3,000 m^{2} yards. Most of the houses have a specific Banat Bulgarian architecture, being narrow and long towards the yard and having a more sharp-pointed roof than the typical Eastern Orthodox Bulgarian houses.

Asenovo is named after the medieval Bulgarian Asen dynasty. The village has a Catholic church (of the Holy Trinity) and a chitalishte (читалище, "community centre"), which was founded in 1927 and named after Petar Parchevich. It disposes of a large and a small hall and a library. Asenovo's Banat Folklore Group is known for winning a total of 18 gold medals at the 5th and 6th National Fair of Folk Art in Koprivshtitsa.

Primarily after World War I, some Eastern Orthodox Bulgarians also settled in Asenovo, but they remain a minority.

As of 2009 the village had a population of 325 inhabitants, mostly Roman Catholic by confession.

The mayor is Petar Ivanov of the Bulgarian Socialist Party.
