= Petar Parchevich =

Bulgarian Roman Catholic archbishop

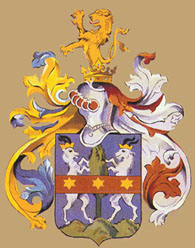
- Ecclesiastical coat of arms of Petar Parchevich
- Born: c. 1612; Chiprovtsi, Ottoman Empire (now Bulgaria)
- Died: 23 July 1674; Rome, Papal States (now Italy)
- Occupation(s): Roman Catholic archbishop, diplomat, scholar

Petar Parchevich (Bulgarian: Петър Парчевич [ˈpɛtɐr ˈpart͡ʃɛvit͡ʃ]; Croatian: Petar Parčević) or Petar Mihaylov Parchev (Петър Михайлов Парчев; c. 1612 – 23 July 1674) was a Bulgarian Roman Catholic archbishop, diplomat, scholar, baron of Austria and one of the architects behind the anti-Ottoman Chiprovtsi Uprising.

A native of Chiprovtsi and one of Bulgaria's most educated people of the 17th century, Parchevich was among the leaders of the Bulgarian Roman Catholics. His numerous diplomatic visits to the royal courts of Europe were mostly in an attempt to garner support for an anti-Ottoman uprising in Bulgaria, which he did not live to witness. Nevertheless, his efforts in defending Christianity earned him a noble title from the Austrian emperors, and he took up several important positions within the Roman Catholic ecclesiastical hierarchy.

== Education and early diplomacy ==
Petar Parchevich was born circa 1612 in Chiprovtsi to an influential Parchevich (Parčević) family, having Croatian roots and being the ancestral house of the House of Pejačević, a distinguished noble family in the 18th and 19th century Kingdom of Croatia. Chiprovtsi was then a Catholic-populated town in the northwestern Bulgarian lands under the rule of the Ottoman Empire. In the 17th century, Chiprovtsi was a rich merchant town in its cultural heyday. Like many Bulgarians from Chiprovtsi at the time, Parchevich was sent to be educated in Italy. Having studied in Rome and Loreto, he returned to Bulgaria in 1643 as a doctor of theology and canon law, which made him one of the most educated Bulgarians of his age.

Upon his return, Parchevich engaged in diplomacy with the ultimate goal of ensuring the Liberation of Bulgaria from Ottoman rule. Receiving papal support, Parchevich visited the royal courts of Europe and advocated the formation of an anti-Ottoman alliance which would drive out the Ottoman Turks from the Balkans. Parchevich was received by the courts of the Austrian Empire, the Polish–Lithuanian Commonwealth, the Republic of Venice, the principalities of Wallachia and Moldavia, and Pope Innocent X himself. There, he requested backing for an anti-Ottoman campaign which would lead to the liberation of the Balkans, and "most of all, of the great Bulgarian Empire".

Parchevich made several visits to Poland, such as once in 1647, when he was met by Władysław IV Vasa, and once in late 1649, when he was received by the new king John II Casimir Vasa. In his speech before the Senate of Venice from 1650, Parchevich referred to the "unbearable Ottoman yoke" and told of the Bulgarian people's long struggle against the Ottomans. After meeting with Innocent and persuading the pope that Bulgaria could collect an army of 20,000 for an anti-Ottoman campaign, Parchevich remained in Rome until the spring of 1651.

== Archbishop, major diplomat and baron ==
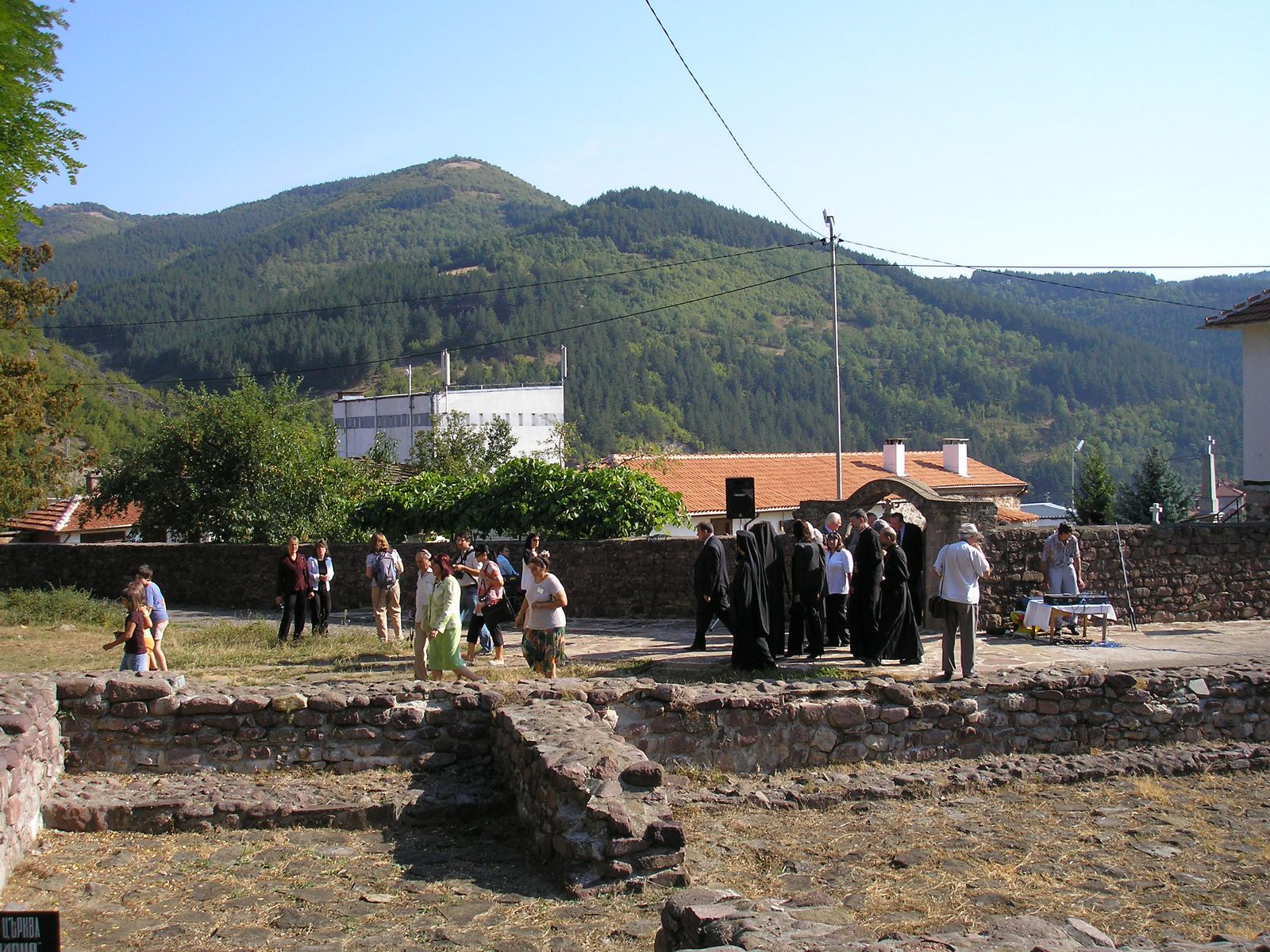
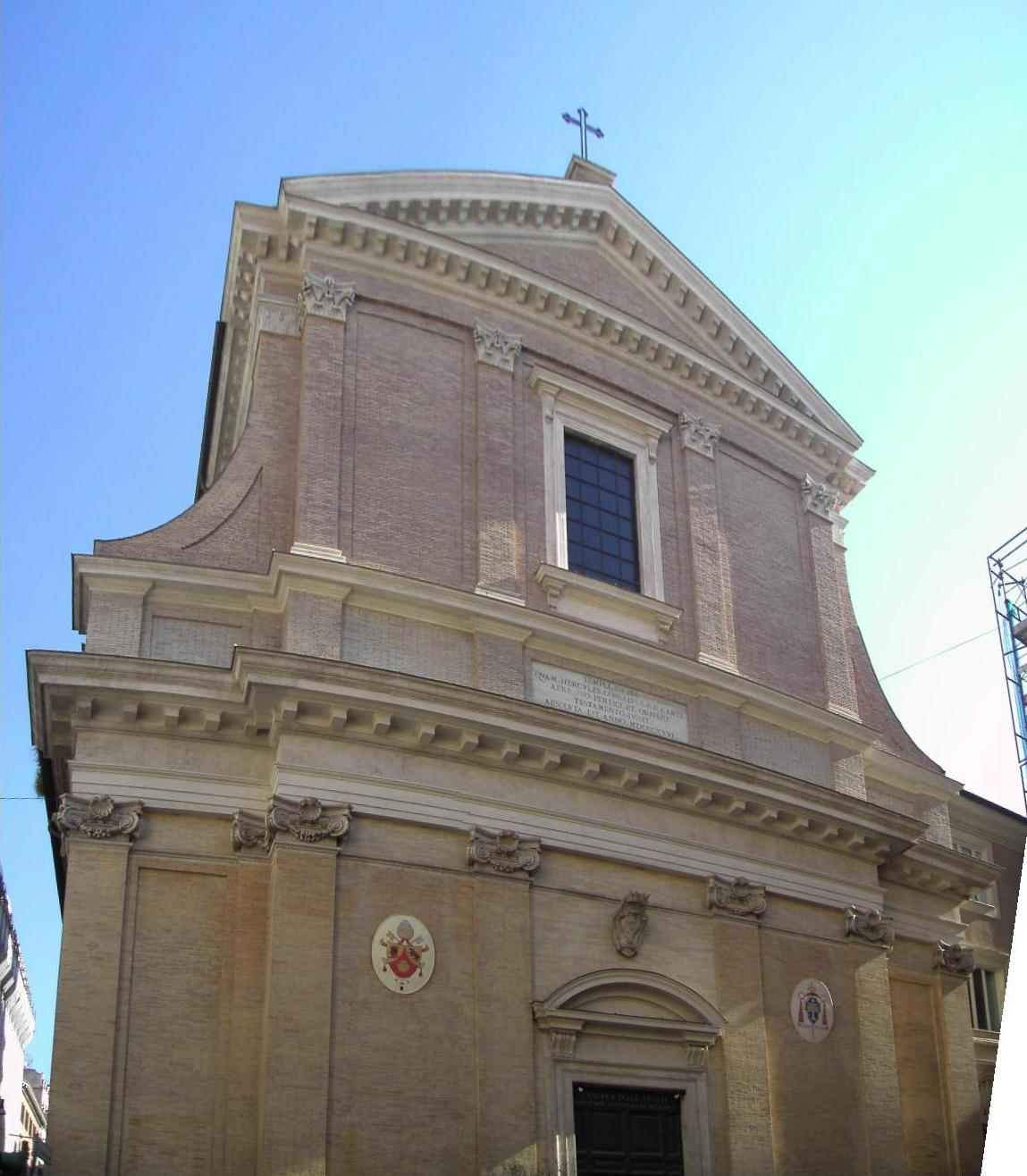
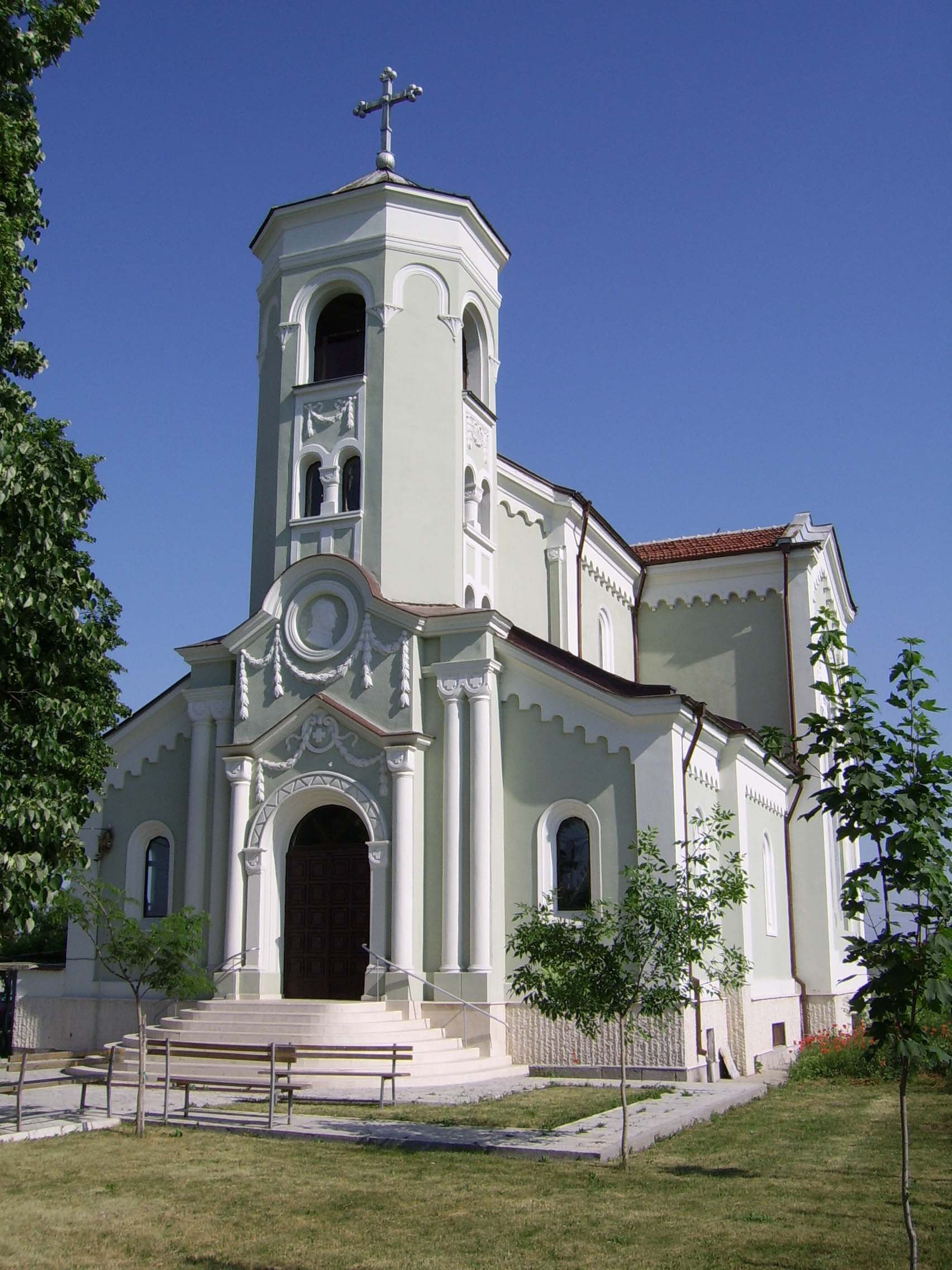
Ruins of the Catholic church in Parchevich's native Chiprovtsi (left), the church in Rome where he was buried (centre), and the church in the Parchevich neighbourhood of Rakovski (right)

In 1658, Parchevich was appointed head of the Roman Catholic Diocese of Marcianopolis (named after an Ancient Roman city near modern Devnya, northeastern Bulgaria). Along with the Diocese of Nicopoli headed by Filip Stanislavov, Marcianopolis was one of the two sees which succeeded the Bulgarian Custody as the governing body of Catholicism in Bulgaria. Parchevich also held the position of Bulgarian internuncio to the Viennese court. In 1661, Parchevich had to step down as Archbishop of Marcianopolis due to pressure from Rome, which condemned his clerical inactivity, though in 1668 he became apostolic vicar to Moldavia despite continuing suspicion.

By the mid-1650s, Parchevich had entered major European politics and was the central figure of a significant anti-Ottoman plot. In 1656, Parchevich arranged a meeting in Târgoviște between the members of the plot, which included the rulers of Moldavia and Wallachia and high-ranking clerics, including the Serbian Patriarch. After the meeting, Parchevich sent revolutionary messages to Bulgaria, Serbia, Albania and Greece, hoping to incite a rebellion. His plans were backed by the rulers of the Romanian lands which border Bulgaria north of the Danube: Gheorghe Ştefan of Moldavia and Constantin Şerban of Wallachia. However, the lack of clear support by key accomplice Austria meant an eventual uprising had to be delayed. In 1657, Parchevich was received by Cossack hetman Bohdan Khmelnytsky, whom he visited on a special mission. In the same year, he was granted the noble title of baron by the Habsburgs owing to his merits in defending Christianity. As an Austrian noble, he was styled Peter Freiherr von Parchevich.

In spite of Parchevich's efforts, conditions would not be favourable to a Bulgarian anti-Ottoman uprising until well after his death. While on a diplomatic mission to Pope Clement X, he died of illness in Rome in the summer of 1674 and was buried at the Sant'Andrea delle Fratte basilica in the city. Parchevich's letters and reports have been preserved and are an important source of information regarding his activities.

== Honours ==
Various institutions around Bulgaria have been named after Petar Parchevich, including streets in the capital Sofia and Shumen. A Catholic football club known as SK Parchevich was founded in Plovdiv in 1923 and later merged into what is today PFC Lokomotiv Plovdiv. One of the neighbourhoods of the mostly Catholic-populated town of Rakovski in Plovdiv Province is also known as Parchevich. In addition, three schools, in Plovdiv, Rakovski and Chiprovtsi, are named after him, as is a community centre (chitalishte) in the Banat Bulgarian village of Asenovo, Pleven Province. Parchevich Ridge in the Breznik Heights on Greenwich Island of the South Shetland Islands, Antarctica, also bears his name thanks to the efforts of the Antarctic Place-names Commission of Bulgaria.

== Sources ==
- Castellan, Georges (1999). Histoire des Balkans, XIVe-XXe siècle (in French). Paris: Fayard. p. 147. ISBN 2-213-60526-2.
- Бакалов, Георги (2007). История на Българите: Военна история на българите от древността до наши дни (in Bulgarian). София: Труд. ISBN 978-954-621-235-1.
- Чолов, Петър (1988). "Шест десетилетия подготовка за въстание". Чипровското въстание 1688 г. (in Bulgarian) (1 ed.). София: Народна просвета. OCLC 19710925.
