= Kopren =

Summit on the border between Serbia and Bulgaria

- Копрен
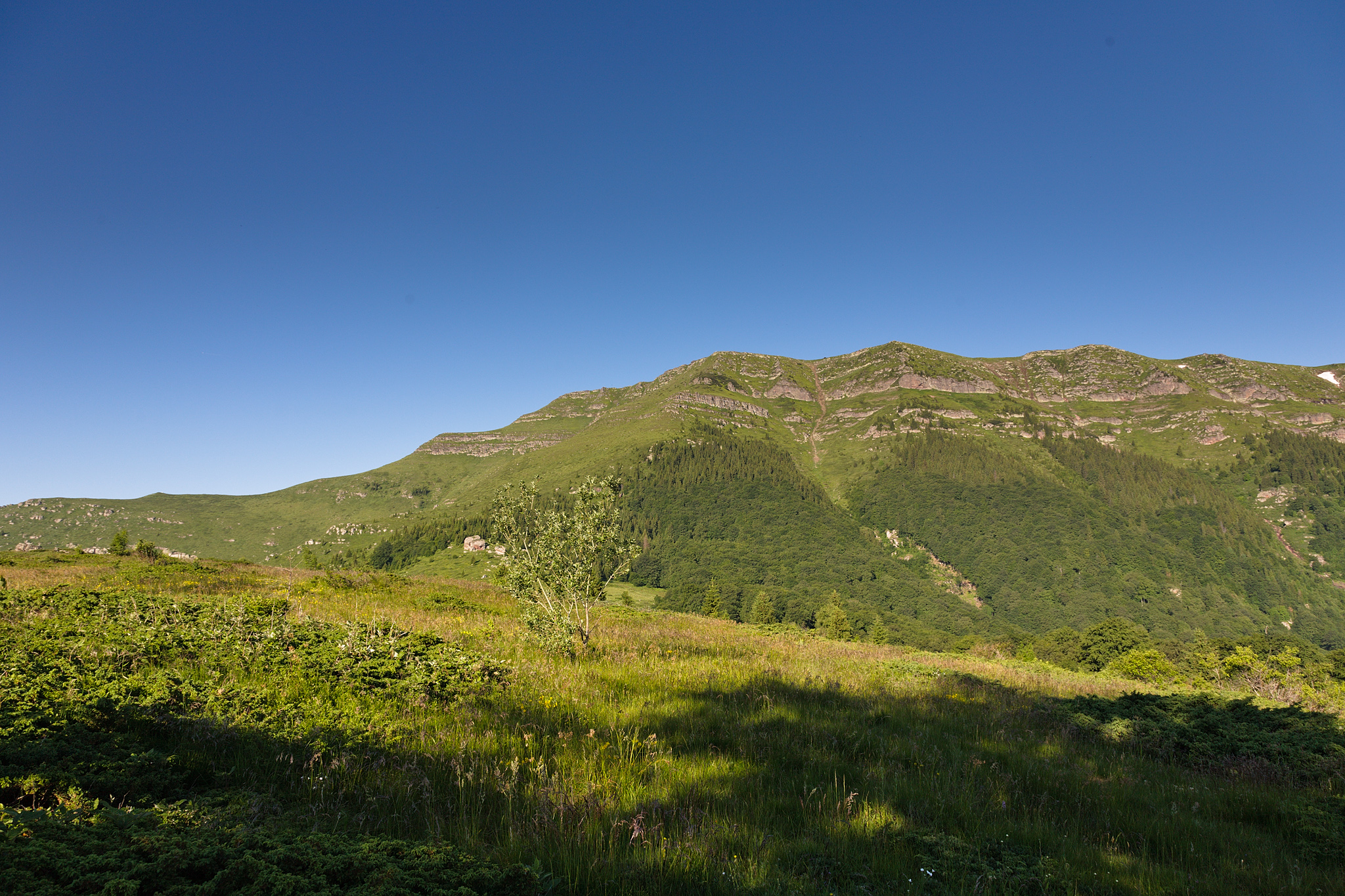
- Kopren from the Bulgarian side

Highest point
- Elevation: 1,965 m (6,447 ft)
- Coordinates: 43°18′14″N 22°46′46″E

Geography
- Location within Bulgaria
- Countries: Bulgaria, Serbia
- Parent range: Balkan Mountains

Kopren (Bulgarian and Serbian Cyrillic: Копрен) is a summit in the western Balkan Mountains, on the border ridge between Bulgaria and Serbia. Kopren is 1,965 m (6,447 ft) high and belongs to the Chiprovtsi Mountain, one of the highest parts of the Balkan Mountains.

The western slopes of Kopren towards Serbia are a subalpine plateau. Towards Bulgaria, the eastern face of Kopren is steep and rocky as it descends to Kopilovtsi. The stone ruins of an abandoned border post stand at 1,840 m (6,040 ft) below Kopren on the Bulgarian side. The summit boasts panoramic views of the entire Chiprovtsi Mountain and the Berkovitsa Mountain with Kom Peak, as well as of Montana and the Ogosta Reservoir in the lowlands.

Both the Bulgarian and the Serbian foothills of Kopren abound in waterfalls. The Kopren Waterfall is one of the highest in Serbia. On the Bulgarian side, the Kopren Waterfalls marked circuit trail offers access to numerous smaller waterfalls, including Durshin Skok, Grafski Skok and Vodni Skok; Lanzhin Skok is away from the trail, on one of the routes towards the summit.

Several marked trails (all of them notably steep) lead from the trailhead at Kopren Hut (950 m (3,120 ft)) above Kopilovtsi towards Kopren.
