= Skakavac =

Skakavac may refer to:

- Skakavac, Sarajevo, a waterfall near Sarajevo, Bosnia and Herzegovina
- Skakavac Waterfall (Mrkonjić Grad), a waterfall near Mrkonjić Grad, Bosnia and Herzegovina
- Skakavac, Foča, a waterfall in Perućica near Foča, Bosnia and Herzegovina
- Skakavac, Croatia, a village near Karlovac
- Skakavac, Bosanski Petrovac, a village in Bosnia and Herzegovina
- Skakavac, Berane Municipality, a village in Montenegro
