= Jelovarnik =

Waterfall in Serbia

Jelovarnik waterfall
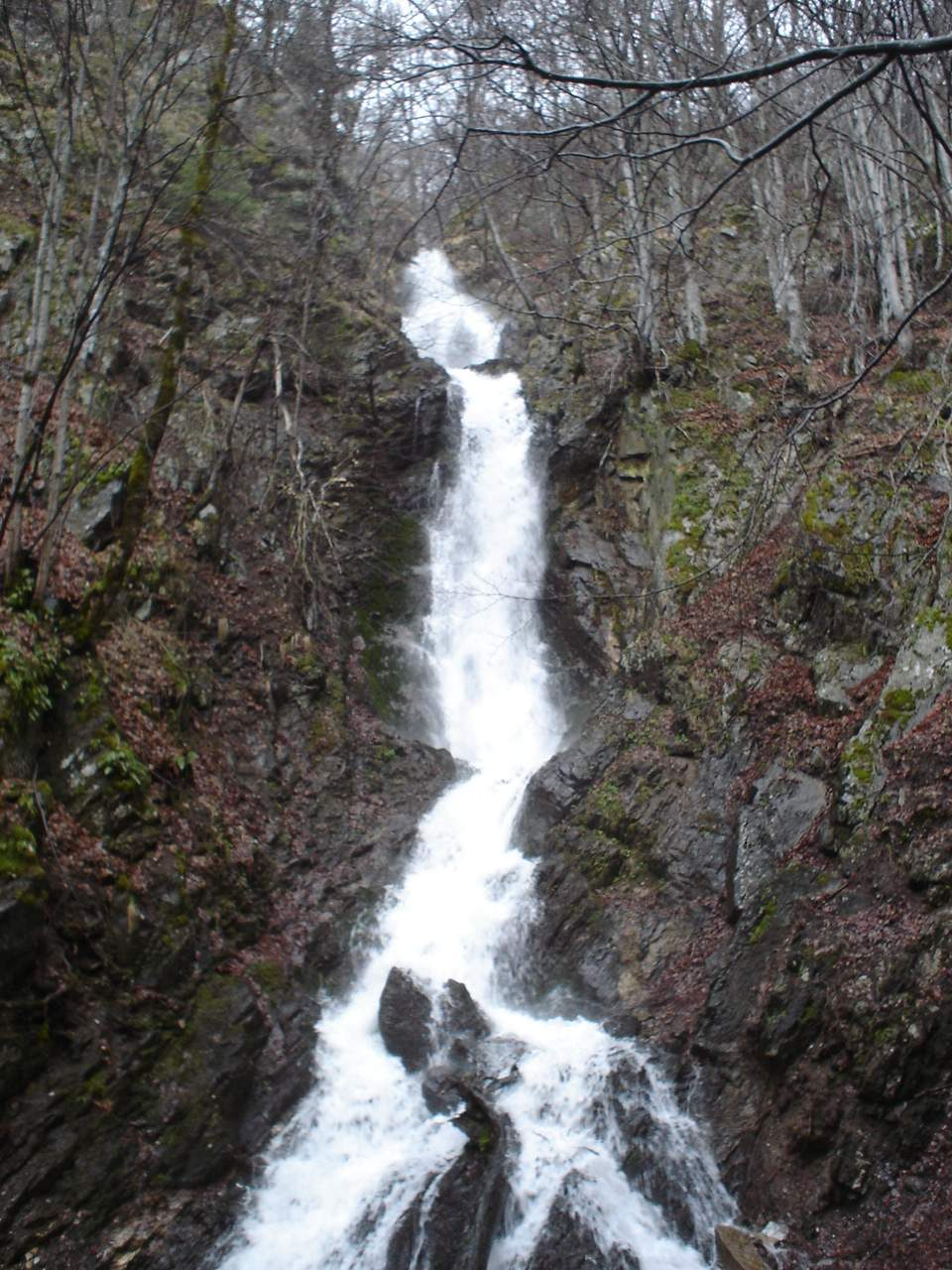
- Interactive map of Jelovarnik waterfall
- Location: Kopaonik, Serbia
- Total height: 71 m (233 ft)
- Number of drops: 3

Jelovarnik is the second tallest waterfall in Serbia, with a total height of 71 meters. Located within the Kopaonik national park Jelovarnik, it lies at an elevation of 1,116 meters and is situated about 2.5 kilometers east of Pančićev vrh, the highest peak in Kopaonik. The waterfall is nestled in a dense forest featuring Balkan maple, beech, and spruce trees.

Although Jelovarnik was previously known only to the local community, it was officially discovered by geologists in 1998. The waterfall is now part of a natural park that spans 57 hectares and is protected for its rich flora and fauna, adding to the natural beauty of the region.

== See more ==
- Geography of Serbia
