= Chiprovtsi uprising =

Revolt against the Ottoman Empire in 1688

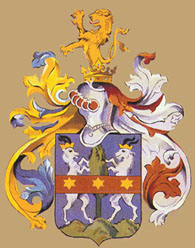
Coat of arms of Bulgarian Roman Catholic bishop and diplomat Petar Parchevich, a key figure in the uprising's early organization

The Chiprovtsi uprising (Bulgarian: Чипровско въстание, Chiprovsko vastanie) was an uprising against Ottoman rule organized in northwestern Bulgaria by Roman Catholic Bulgarians, but also involving many Eastern Orthodox Christians. It broke out after the capture of Belgrade by Austria on 6 September 1688 and ended unsuccessfully, with the centre of insurrectionary activity, Chiprovtsi, being completely destroyed by Ottoman forces.

== Background ==
=== Chiprovtsi under Ottoman rule ===
After the conquest of Bulgaria the Ottomans left a number of regions, towns and villages out of the Ottoman administrative system. These were usually key regions that were left to be governed by the old Bulgarian administration for practical reasons. Such towns were the ones guarding the Balkan passes, as well as important ore extraction areas like Chiprovtsi. Although the status of the then-village in the period is not completely clear, it is generally considered that the Christian Bulgarian aristocracy retained most of its authority in Chiprovtsi. Sources from Dubrovnik mention the family of Soymirovich, whose members lived in Chiprovtsi as sovereign rulers until the end of the 14th century. After the Ottoman invasion the family (or at least most of it) moved to Dubrovnik, where they became part of the local aristocracy and possibly accepted Roman Catholicism without forgetting their old possessions. Other known families from the period are Peyachevich, Parchevich, Cherkich, Markanich and Knezhevich.

During the next century Chiprovtsi was a has (a permanent possession) of the sultan's family and later a valide hanım (estate of the sultan's mother). The rights of the Christian self-government possibly inherited from the Second Bulgarian Empire and adapted to the Ottoman military feudal system were significantly curtailed in the 16th and 17th century.

Around the middle of the 17th century, the idea to restore the Bulgarian state with the aid of the Catholic Western Europe began emerging in the circle of the pro-Western Chiprovtsi nobility. A prominent figure in this strategy was Petar Parchevich, who visited the courts of the Austrian Empire, the Polish–Lithuanian Commonwealth, the Republic of Venice, the principalities of Wallachia and Moldavia, and Pope Innocent X, to request backing for an anti-Ottoman campaign which would lead to the liberation of the Balkans, and "most of all, of the great Bulgarian Empire".

=== Organization ===
Additional factors for the uprising were the events in the middle of the 17th century, in particular the blow that the mighty Ottoman Empire received with defeat at the Battle of Vienna in 1683. The introduction of heavy taxes intended to secure the costly yet ineffective European campaigns of the empire and the deprivation of the Bulgarian Catholics of some of their rights played an important role in the setup of the uprising. Petar Parchevich, a highly educated Bulgarian Catholic cleric and diplomat, carried out a large-scale diplomatic campaign among the Christian rulers of Central Europe between 1630 and 1645. Together with Petar Bogdan Bakshev and Franchesko Soymirovich, they visited Austrian monarch Ferdinand II, the king of the Polish–Lithuanian Commonwealth Sigismund III Vasa, and his heir, Władysław IV Vasa as well as Wallachian voivode, Matei Basarab. Around 1647 the Ottomans withdrew almost entirely from northwestern Bulgaria in relation to their war with Venice for Crete. Matei Basarab sent messengers to promise a 20,000-strong army to support the uprising. In the decisive moment, however, Władysław IV died on 20 May 1648 and the uprising was called off.

After the campaign's failure, Parchevich went to Venice together with the governor of Chiprovtsi Franchesko Markanich and then visited the new Polish king Jan II Kazimierz Vasa, as well as the Austrian royal court, being denied assistance at all three places. Parchevich also met Pope Innocent X and also visited Germany, Hungary, Transylvania and Wallachia after 1651. The unsuccess of these missions, as well as Austria and Poland's reluctance to head an anti-Ottoman coalition again frustrated the uprising's outbreak at this time.

A war between Poland and the Ottoman Empire began in 1671 that activated Bogdan and Parchevich's work. A coalition against the Ottomans did not form again, with Parchevich dying in Rome on 23 July 1674 and Bogdan following in September of the same year.

Polish king Jan III Sobieski delivered a great blow to the Ottoman forces at Vienna on 12 September 1683, never again allowing them to return beyond that point. Austria and Poland concluded a union against the Ottomans in the spring of 1684 with Venice joining later. Russia also decided to become part of the coalition in 1686. The union this time sought the help of Bulgarian Catholics alone. It was noted by Bulgarian Bishop that over 500 Albanian Catholics in the region were involved in the Uprising against the Turks as well. The residents of Chiprovtsi and the neighbouring villages decided that the appropriate moment had come when the Austrian army took Belgrade on 6 September 1688.

== Military activity ==
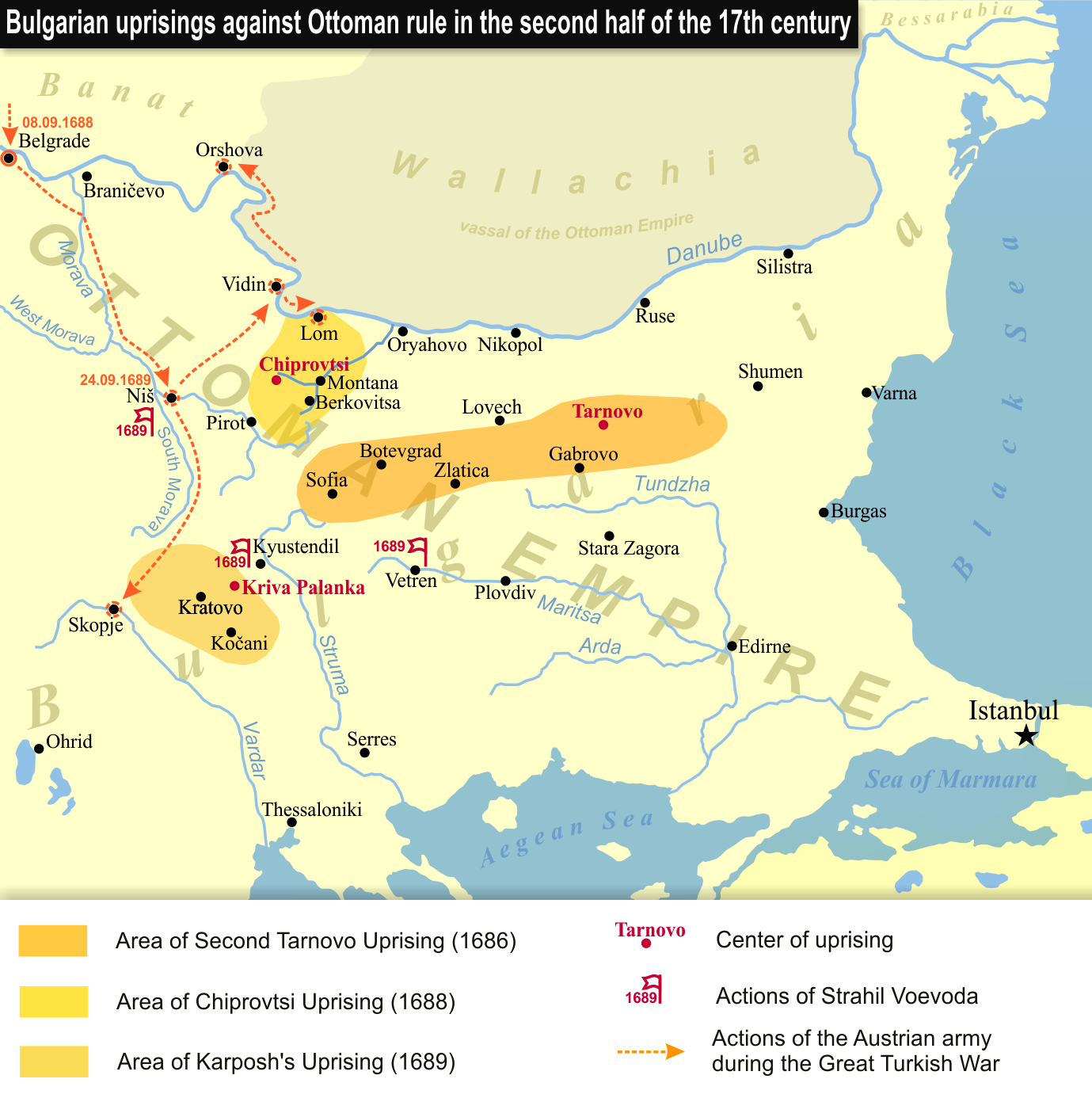
Chiprovtsi Uprising, Second Tarnovo Uprising and Karposh's Uprising.

The Chiprovtsi Uprising's progress and organizations are not well documented. Bulgarian leaders of the uprising included brothers Ivan and Mihail Stanislavov together with Bogdan Marinov. Insurrectionary units under Georgi Peyachevich left the village to join the Austrian army in the spring of 1688, with Peyachevich's forces participating in the assault on Orşova and the whole Banat. The uprising broke out in the entire northwestern Bulgaria area after the battle for Belgrade. The advancing of 6 Austrian regiments did not succeed in coordinating the Bulgarian units that did nothing to stop the Ottoman regroup. The decisive battle took place in October 1688 in the Zheravitsa country close to Kutlovitsa, where the insurrectionary forces were defeated by Ottoman troops and their Magyar allies. Although fighting went on, the uprising was quickly suppressed, with Chiprovtsi being captured on 18 October after a heroic defence and was completely destroyed together with the neighbouring villages of Kopilovtsi, Zhelezna and Klisura. Almost the entire population was killed or taken into slavery. The resistance continued in the following months as the remains of the insurrectionary force became bands of hajduks. Meanwhile, the Austrian troops beyond the Balkan Mountains did nothing and only captured Vidin in the autumn of 1689.

== Consequences ==
The uprising and its suppression caused a great wave of emigration from northwestern Bulgaria, mostly to the Christian-dominated areas to the west and north. The main wave of refugees settled around the Danube close to Vidin and Lom, around Pirot, Sofia and Berkovitsa. The largest group of refugees fled to Wallachia where it broke up and was gradually assimilated, although certain parts formed the ethnic group of the Banat Bulgarians in the Banat together with heirs of Paulicians from around Nikopol and Svishtov that came in the end of the 17th century.

The Chiprovtsi Uprising put an end to northwestern Bulgaria's status as a buffer zone between the Ottoman Empire and the Habsburg territories, with Catholic influence largely ceasing. The privileges of Bulgarian nobility and its authority in the region were eliminated and Chiprovtsi's importance as a cultural and economic centre considerably decreased.
