= Buble, Kosovo =

Bubël Bublje
- Village
- Location in Kosovo
- Coordinates: 42°31′25″N 20°39′8″E
- Location: Kosovo
- District: Prizren
- Municipality: Malishevë

Area
  - Total: 312 km^{2} (120 sq mi)

Population (2024)
  - Total: 439
- Time zone: UTC+1 (CET)
  - Summer (DST): UTC+2 (CEST)

Buble or Bublje, (Albanian: Buble, Serbian: Bublje) is a village in Kosovo, near Mališevo. It is near the Miruša Waterfalls. The nearest biggest city is Klina. There is an old bridge that runs over the river. Municipality of Ponorit includes Buble. Buble and Llabuçeva had 29 houses and 606 inhabitants in a 1919 census.
