= Topli Do, Pirot =

Topli Do Топли До
- Village
- Location within Serbia
- Coordinates: 43°20′N 22°40′E
- Country: Serbia
- District: Pirot District
- Municipality: Pirot

Population (2002)
  - Total: 108
- Time zone: UTC+1 (CET)
  - Summer (DST): UTC+2 (CEST)

Topli Do is a village in the municipality of Pirot, Serbia. According to the 2002 census, the village has a population of 108 people.
