= Georgi Damyanovo =

Georgi Damyanovo Георги Дамяново
- Location of Georgi Damyanovo
- Coordinates: 43°23′N 23°02′E
- Country: Bulgaria
- Provinces (Oblast): Montana

Government
  - Mayor: Dilyan Dimitrov
- Elevation: 464 m (1,522 ft)

Population (2008)
  - Total: 545
- Time zone: UTC+2 (EET)
  - Summer (DST): UTC+3 (EEST)
- Postal Code: 3470
- Area code: 09551

Georgi Damyanovo (Bulgarian: Георги Дамяново, pronounced [ɡɛˈɔrɡi dɐˈmʲanovo]) is a village in northwestern Bulgaria, part of Montana Province. It is the administrative centre of the homonymous Georgi Damyanovo Municipality, which lies in the southern part of Montana Province.

The village is located at the foot of the Western Balkan Mountains, with the Ogosta river running nearby. Georgi Damyanovo is situated 20 kilometres from Montana and 136 kilometres from Sofia. Its old name was Lopushna (Лопушна), but it was renamed in honour of the politician Georgi Damyanov (1892–1958), who was born there. The local community centre (chitalishte) was opened in 1899.The region is known with the gold mines explored since the Roman times. Nowadays gold in minimal quantity can be found in the sands of the Ogosta river.

== Municipality ==
Georgi Damyanovo municipality spreads over an area of 293 square kilometres and includes the following 13 places:

- Chemish
- Diva Slatina
- Dalgi Del
- Elovitsa
- Gavril Genovo
- Georgi Damyanovo
- Glavanovtsi
- Govezhda
- Kamenna Riksa
- Kopilovtsi
- Melyane
- Pomezhdin
- Vidlitsa
