= Lopushna Monastery =

World heritage

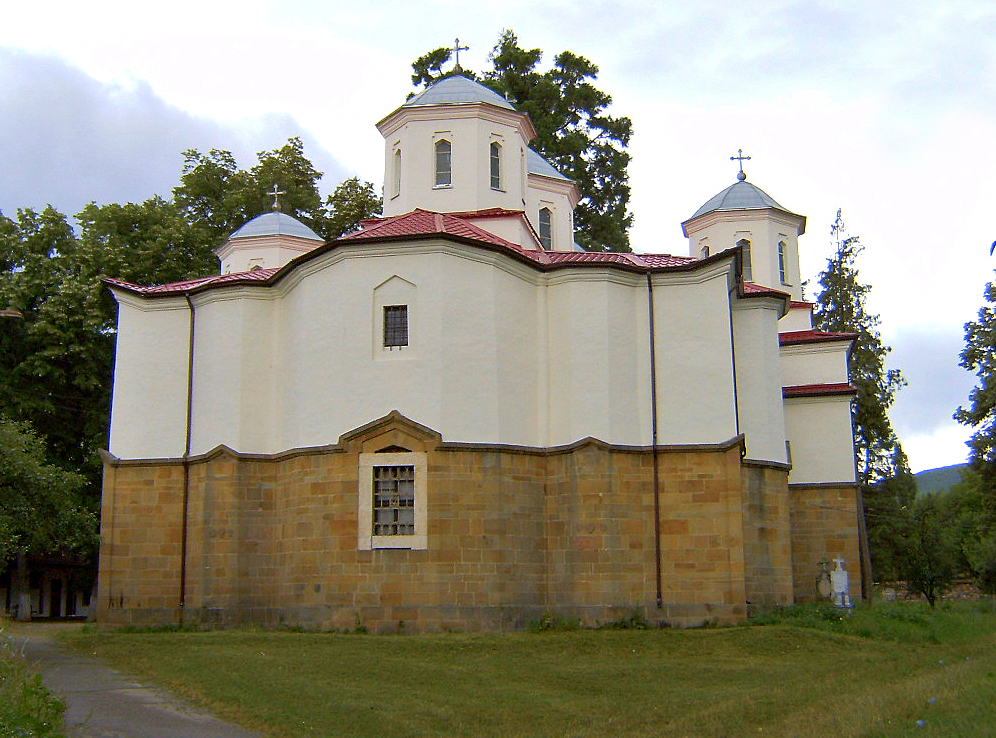
- Apse view of the Lopushna Monastery cathedral
- Interactive map of Lopushna Monastery

Monastery information
- Full name: Lopushna Monastery of Saint John the Forerunner
- Other name: Лопушански манастир „Свети Йоан Предтеча“ (Bulgarian)
- Established: 12th–14th century
- Diocese: Vidin Eparchy, Bulgarian Orthodox Church
- Controlled churches: Church of Saint John the Forerunner (monastery cathedral)

People
- Important associated figures: Dionysius (important abbot); Lilo Lazarov (chief architect)

Site
- Location: Georgi Damyanovo, Montana Province, Bulgaria
- Coordinates: 43°22′34″N 23°1′10.5″E
- Public access: yes

The Lopushna Monastery of Saint John the Forerunner (Bulgarian: Лопушански манастир „Свети Йоан Предтеча“, Lopushanski manastir „Sveti Yoan Predtecha“) is a Bulgarian Orthodox monastery in northwestern Bulgaria. It lies in the Chiprovtsi part of the western Balkan Mountains, 1.5 kilometres (0.93 mi) southwest the village of Georgi Damyanovo, Montana Province.

Founded in the Middle Ages but built in its present appearance throughout the 1850s, the Lopushna Monastery, and particularly its complex main church, are one of the most notable works of the Slavine Architectural School and its most prominent figure, Lilo Lazarov. It was in the construction of the monastery cathedral that Lazarov first employed vernacular Gothic decorative features, a trademark approach of the Slavine School that set it apart from other architectural schools of the Bulgarian National Revival.

== Geography and history ==
The Lopushna Monastery is situated in the valley of the Dalgodelska Ogosta river, in the vicinity of the village of Georgi Damyanovo, formerly known as Lopushna. It lies at around 300 metres (980 ft) above sea level and can be reached through the Petrohan Pass from the capital Sofia, which is 105 kilometres (65 mi) to the south.

The original monastery was probably established during the Second Bulgarian Empire (12th–14th centuries). The monastery had to endure torching and plundering raids in the 14th–18th centuries, the period of the early Ottoman rule of Bulgaria. In the following decades, the support of the nearby Chiprovtsi Monastery meant that the Lopushna Monastery consolidated financially. In the 1840s, Archimandrite Dionysius and the hieromonks Gerasimus and Gideon of the Chiprovtsi Monastery joined the Lopushna Monastery, Dionysius as its hegumen (abbot). Having collected funds, the clerics sought to reconstruct the ill-maintained monastery buildings.

During the Bulgarian National Revival (18th–19th centuries), the Lopushna Monastery housed a religious school and was a haven for Bulgarian freedom fighters and supporters of the struggle for an autonomous Bulgarian Exarchate. National writer Ivan Vazov spent some time at the monastery and wrote part of his most famous work, the novel Under the Yoke (1888), there. The monastery was reconstructed in 1989 due to structure-threatening damage to the north residential wing.

== Architecture ==
=== Construction and style ===
The present facilities of the monastery, a monument of culture of national importance, were mostly constructed in 1850–1853 by Lilo (Ilia) Lazarov, a Bulgarian architect from Slavine. The current yard gate, stone fence and north and south residential wing were all built in 1850–1853. Some finishing touches were being applied to the church up until 1856, when the pavilion drinking fountain was built as well, and the ossuary was added in 1860.

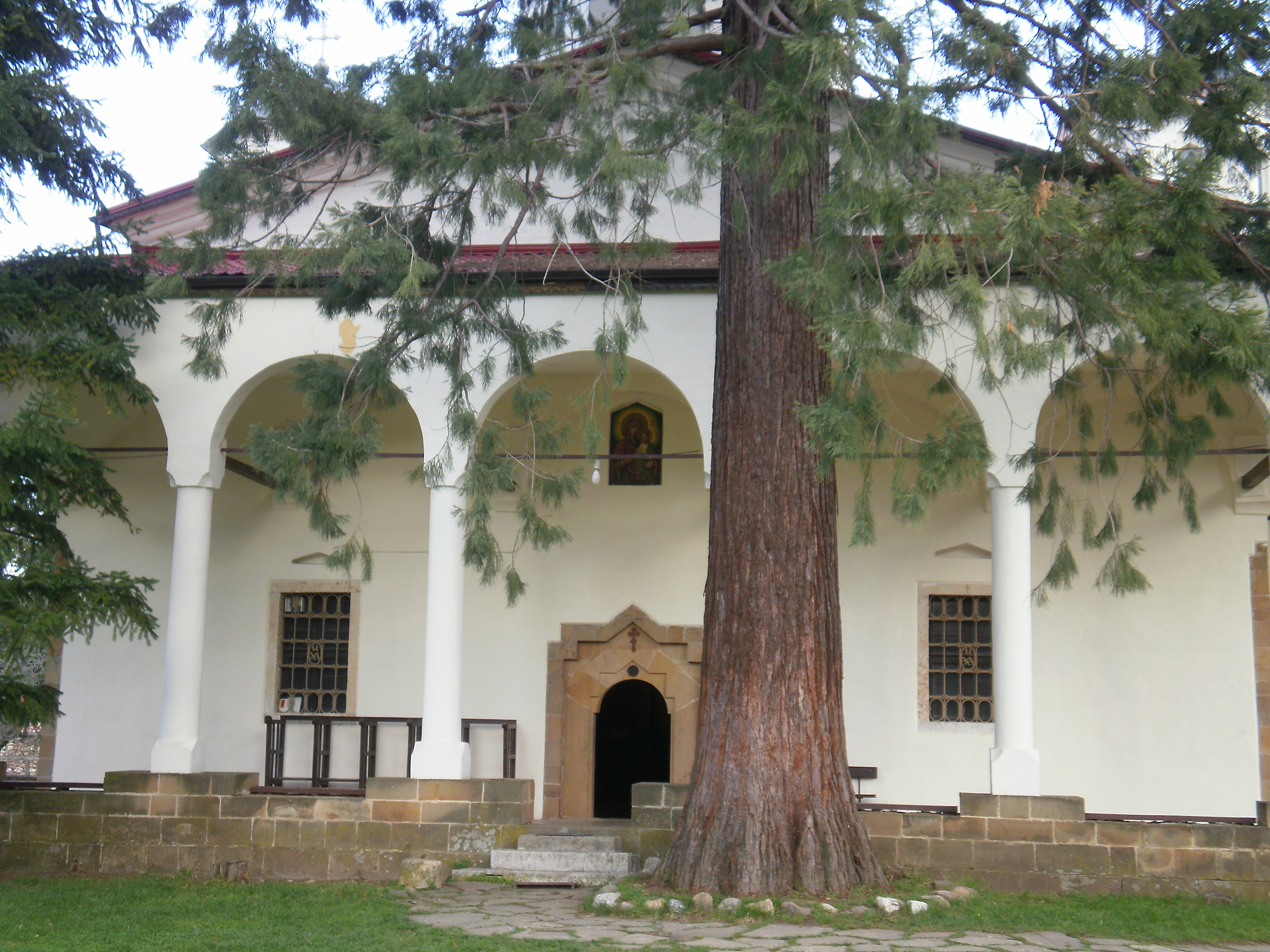
Frontal view of the external narthex and an elaborately decorated door

The monastery cathedral, the Church of Saint John the Baptist, is regarded as the finest and most complex example of church architecture of the Slavine Architectural School established by Lazarov. The architectural approach of the Slavine School, one of 44 such informal schools of the Bulgarian National Revival, is unique with its implementation of Gothic decorative features. Projects by the Slavine School prominently include geometric decorations based on the triangle on apses, domes and external narthexes, as well as sharp-pointed window and door arches. Another discerning feature of the school is the exterior stone relief decoration, in which rosette ornaments play an important part.

Inspiration for the church was the cathedral of the Rila Monastery, the most important monastery in the Bulgarian lands. Lazarov twice visited the Rila Monastery to observe the church's architecture. Before commencing the construction of the Lopushna Monastery church, he made a hazel model of his project in order to receive the approval of the monks and the hegumen. Only two other churches in Bulgaria bear a resemblance to that design: the main church of the Rila Monastery and that of the Etropole Monastery. However, while the Lopushna Monastery church takes inspiration from the Rila Monastery for its plan, it is radically different in decoration and appearance from that of the Rila Monastery. Instead of following the Byzantine Revival and partially Baroque Revival style of the Rila Monastery, the Lopushna Monastery church's architecture displays Gothic Revival features, which were entirely innovative for Bulgarian vernacular architecture at the time. The decoration of windows, cornices, plinths and particularly doors, as well as until 1923 of the porch, is dominated by sharp-pointed shapes and broken lines.

=== Church design and decoration ===
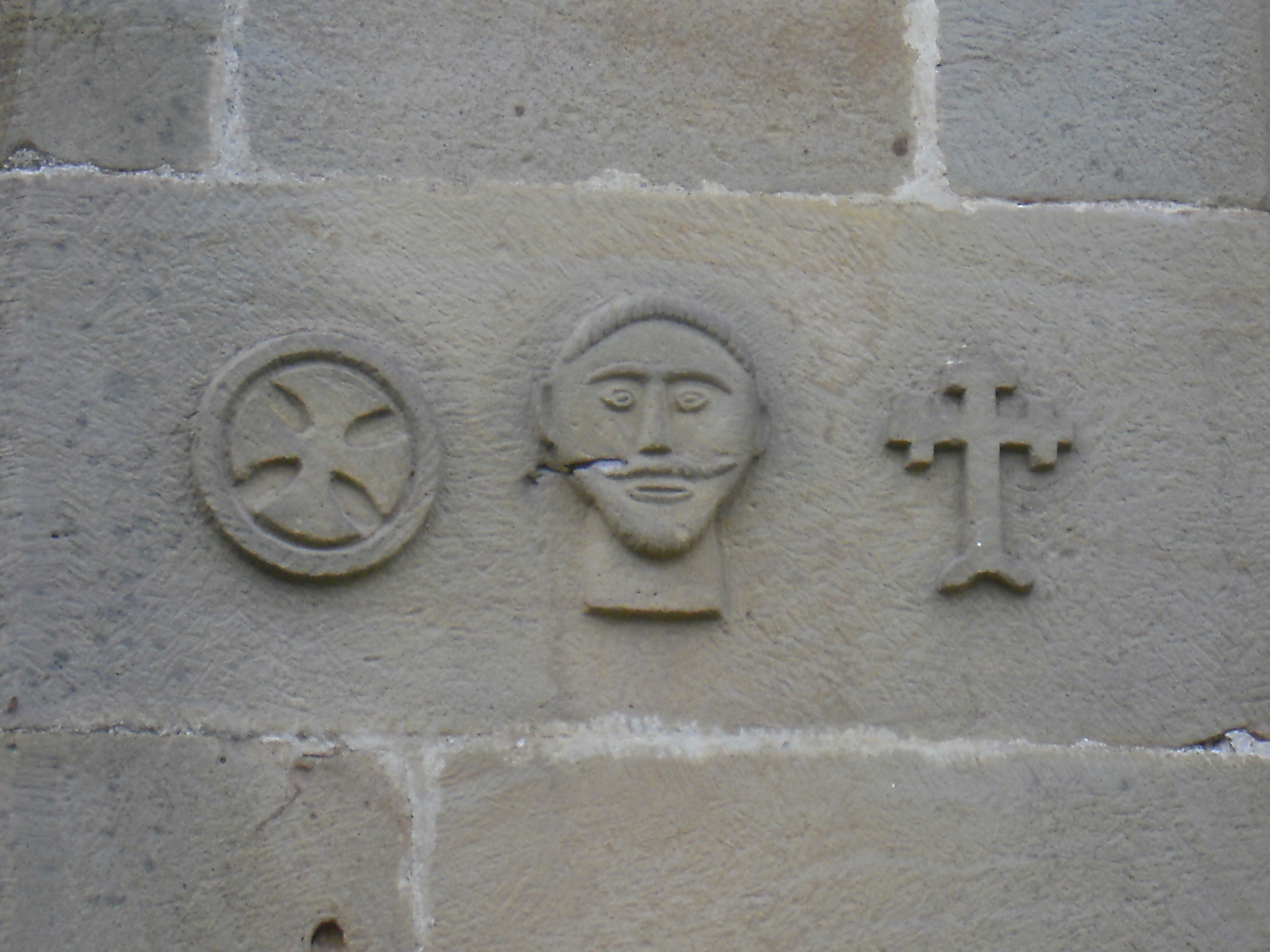
Portrait of master Lilo Lazarov
(church, east facade)

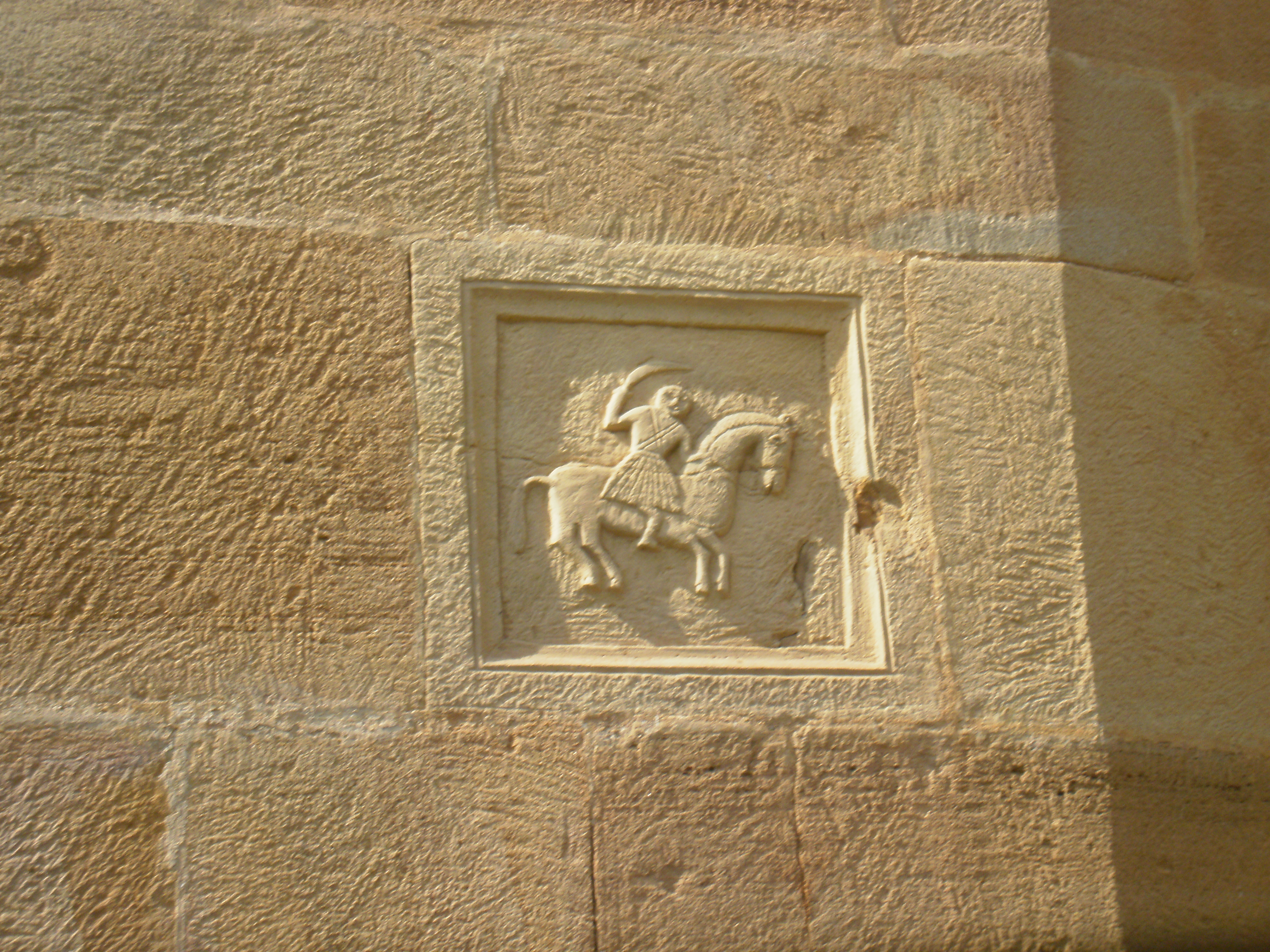
Sword-wielding horseman
(church, north facade)

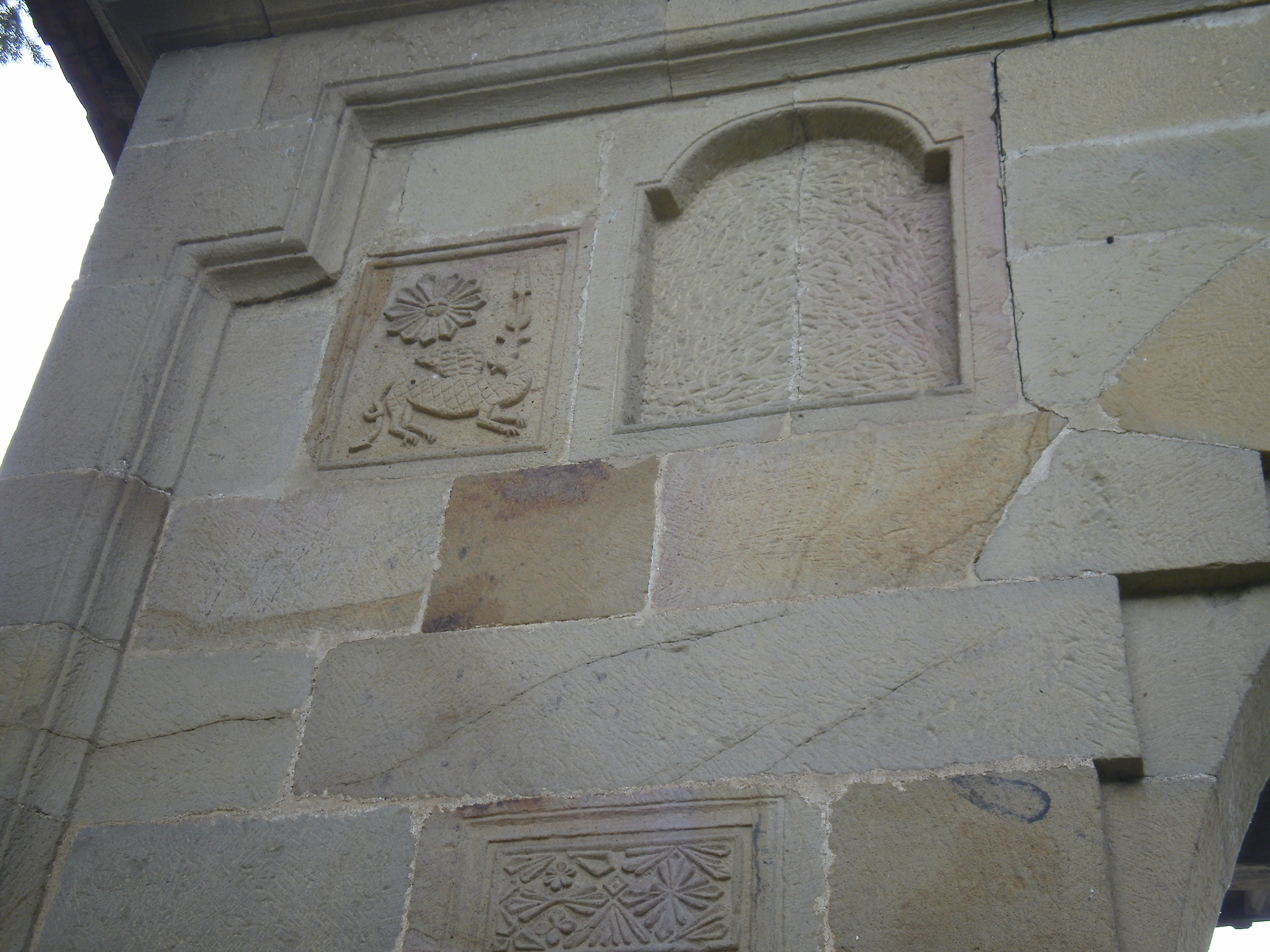
Fire-belching dragon
(yard gate)

Exterior relief decoration of the monastery

The church was constructed between 1850 and 1853. In terms of design, it features three semi-domes and an elongated cella. Single-nave domed chapels (each dedicated to Saints Cosmas and Damian and Saint John the Baptist) are attached to each side of the church, with three additional domes topping the cella's middle nave. At the entrance, the three parts of the church form a U-shaped external narthex. In total, there are five octahedral domes and six doors. Two enter the narthex, two serve the side chapels and a single door is intended for the priest to step into the diaconicon. The church's stone columns were the work of stonemasons from Elovitsa.

The iconostases were carved by masters from Samokov; the main iconostasis was created by Stoycho Fandakov in 1863, and he was probably the author of the side chapels' templa. Eight of the icons in the church and some of those in the side chapels were the work of Samokov iconographer Nikolay Dospevski, while other icons in the chapels were painted by his older brother Stanislav Dospevski, who also did the portrait of the hegumen Dionysius.

The Lopushna Monastery is also notable for its exterior relief decoration. The cathedral's eastern side apses are adorned by the stone portraits of the moustached architect Lazarov (surrounded by a Christian cross and a cross rosette, symbols which call for God's protection of the experienced master) and his chief assistant, possibly Georgi Yovanov from Rosomach (flanked by floral rosettes, a symbol of youth and future blossoming). The windows are decorated with floral details and two-headed eagles. Images of protective characters like stone blocks with sword-wielding horsemen, reliefs of fire-belching dragons, deer and lions can be found on the northern church facade and the yard gate.

== See also ==
- Saint George's Church, Gavril Genovo
- Vernacular adaptations of Gothic Revival

== Sources ==
- Тулешков, Николай (2007). Славинските първомайстори (in Bulgarian). София: Арх & Арт. ISBN 978-954-8931-40-3.
