= Elovitsa =

Elovitsa may refer to:

- In Bulgaria (written in Cyrillic as Еловица):
  - Elovitsa, Montana Province - a village in Georgi Damyanovo Municipality, Montana Province
  - Elovitsa, Pernik Province - a village in Tran Municipality, Pernik Province
