= Glavanovtsi =

Glavanovtsi may refer to the following places in Bulgaria:

- Glavanovtsi, Montana Province
- Glavanovtsi, Pernik Province, on the Jerma river
