= Etropole Literary School =

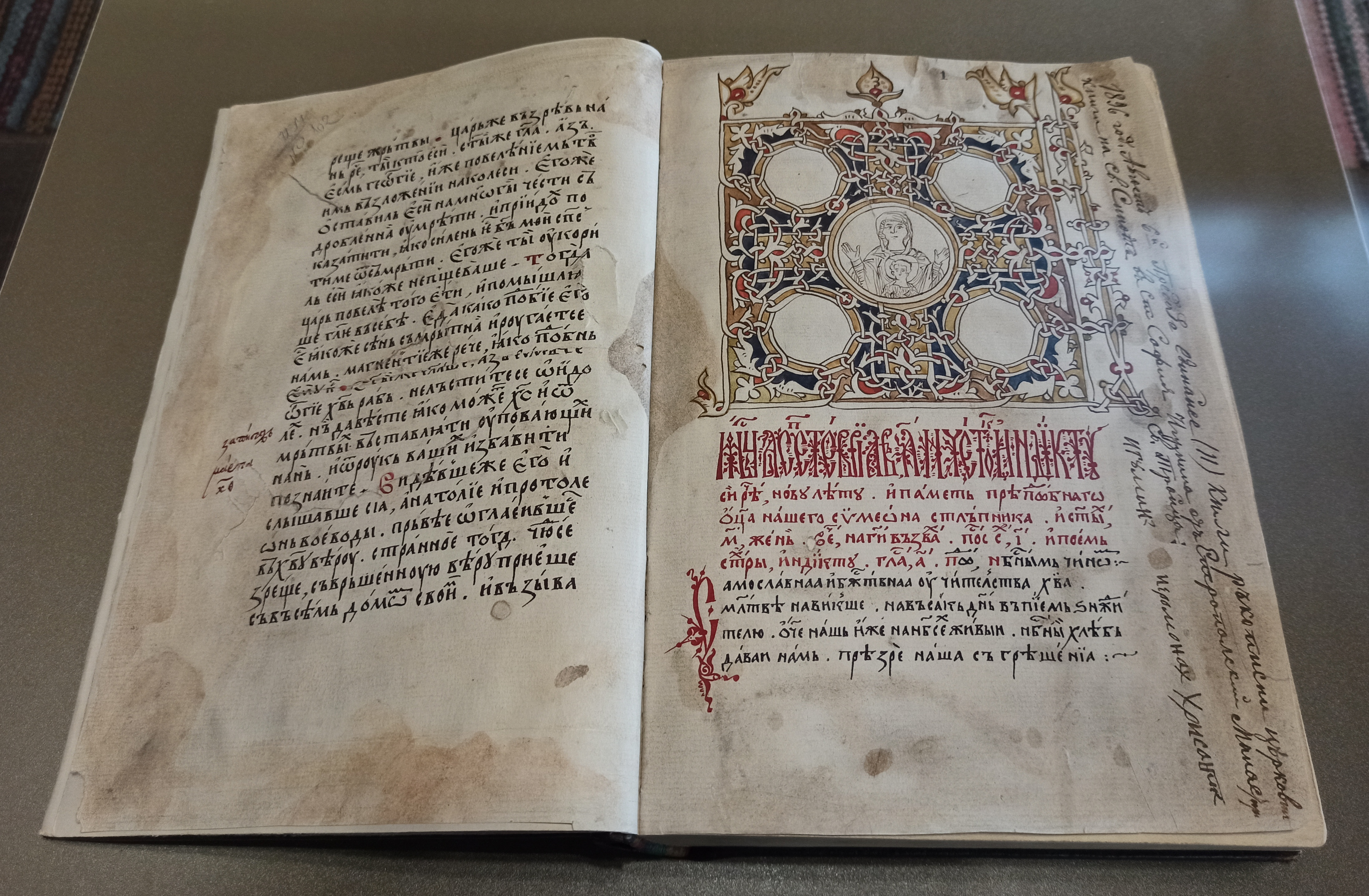
September Menaion, manuscript from the Etropole Literary School, written by Hegumen Zaharii, 1640s. Exhibit of the Etropole History Museum

The Etropole Literary School (Bulgarian: Етрополска книжовна школа) of the late 16th and 17th century was a medieval Bulgarian cultural academy with important contribution to the Medieval Bulgarian literature established in Etropole Monastery.

The school produced numerous copyists, compilers of ecclesiastical collections, and artists who developed a wide range of activities to preserve Bulgarian writing and literature. The names of hieromonk Daniel, hieromonk Raphael, grammarian Boycho, deacon Dragul, deacon John, Daskal Doyo, and others are known. In the monastery were dozens of manuscript books, decorated with painted titles, pages, letters, ornamented vignettes, endings and more. These are the Gospel of 1577, the Prologue of the Months of 1602, and several Gospels of the 17th century.

In 1999, Japan's largest art reproduction company presented the spiritual wealth of Bulgaria in a calendar that included the manuscript of the Four Gospels, which had been written at the Etropole Literary School.
