= Monument to the Unknown Soldier, Botevgrad =

Coordinates: 42°54′27″N 23°47′24″E

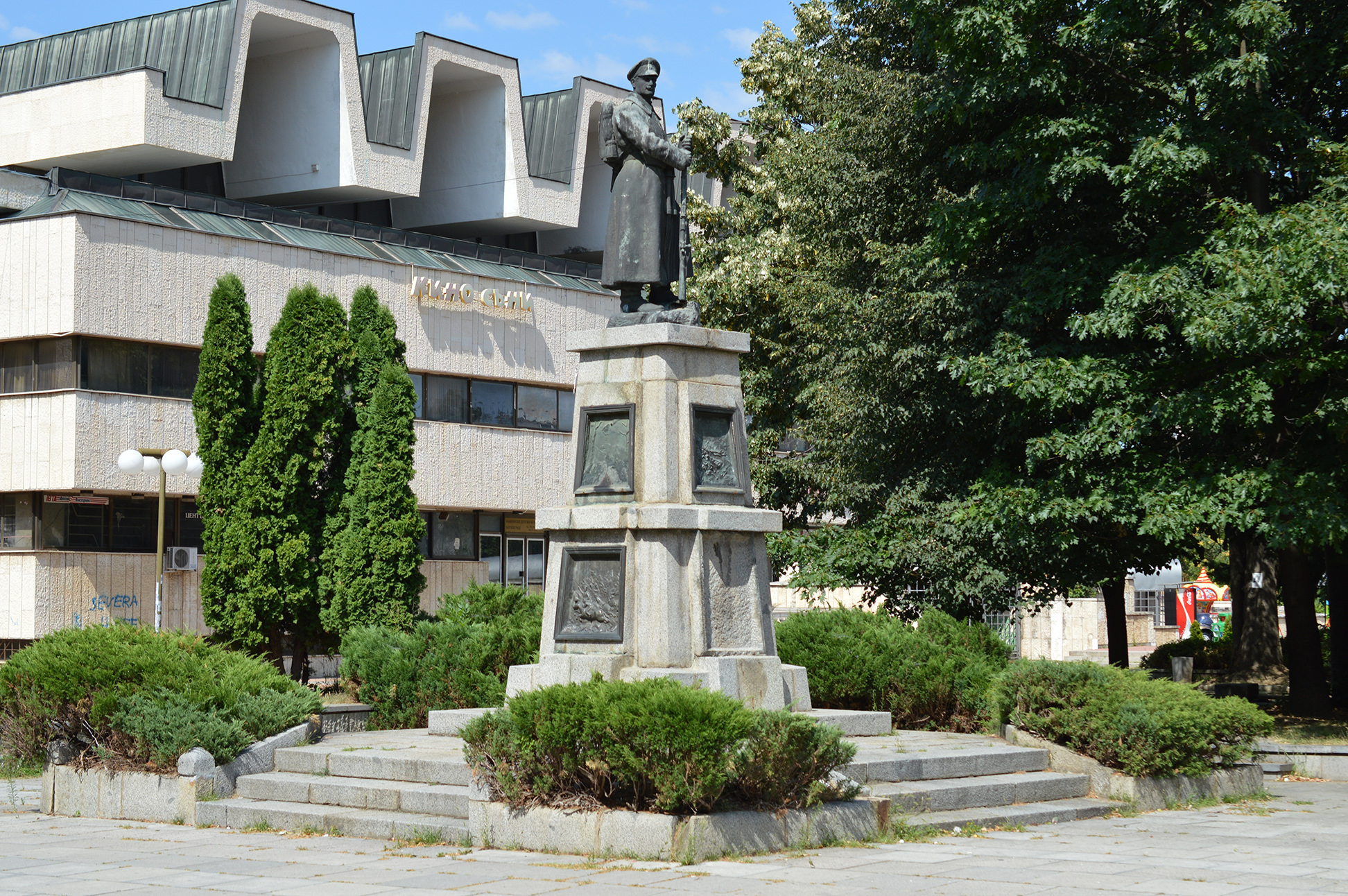
Monument to the Unknown Soldier

The Monument to the Unknown Soldier (Bulgarian: Паметник на Незнайния войн; in the past also known as the Monument to the Heroes and Monument to the Perished for the Fatherland), is a military monument situated at the Unknown Warrior Square in the town of Botevgrad, Bulgaria. It was inaugurated on 20 October 1929 in memory of the 39 officers and soldiers from Botevgrad who died in the First Balkan War, the Second Balkan War and World War I.

== History ==
The monument was constructed with the help of the "Sursuvul" society of officers in reserve, the municipality and the citizens. The Town Committee for the Economic and Cultural Development of the City and the District, which had been established in 1928, had a great influence. The monument was officially inaugurated as the Monument to the Perished for the Fatherland. More than 20,000 people from the city and the neighboring villages were present at the opening ceremony.

Traditionally, the square in front of the monument is the site of the military parades on the Day of Saint George on 6 May, as well as festivities on the occasion of the Day of the National Enlighteners on 1 November and the Bulgarian Education and Culture and Slavonic Literature Day on 24 May. On 9 September 1944 a group organized by the National Committee of the Fatherland Front proclaimed there the communist coup and the change of political power in Bulgaria.

== Description ==
On the south side of the monument are inscribed the names of all 39 officers and soldiers who died in the three wars for national unification. First among them is the poet Stamen Panchev, who was posthumously promoted to lieutenant. Most of the officers were from the Romansky and Tsagarsky families. On the eastern, western, and northern sides of the pedestal are depicted household and military scenes.

The statue represents a soldier in full military uniform with a rifle at his feet. The soldier looks southwest, to the Bulgarian lands in Thrace and Macedonia. As a prototype of the soldier's statue was used a photo of the subordinate Yordan Kurpanov. He had participated in the wars, returned disabled and died in 1924. The same photo was used to make the statue on the military monument in the town of Etropole. The soldier’s figure of the monument was cast of bronze in Rome.
