= Saint George's Church, Gavril Genovo =

Coordinates: 43°23′44.21″N 23°3′56.11″E

Saint George's Church
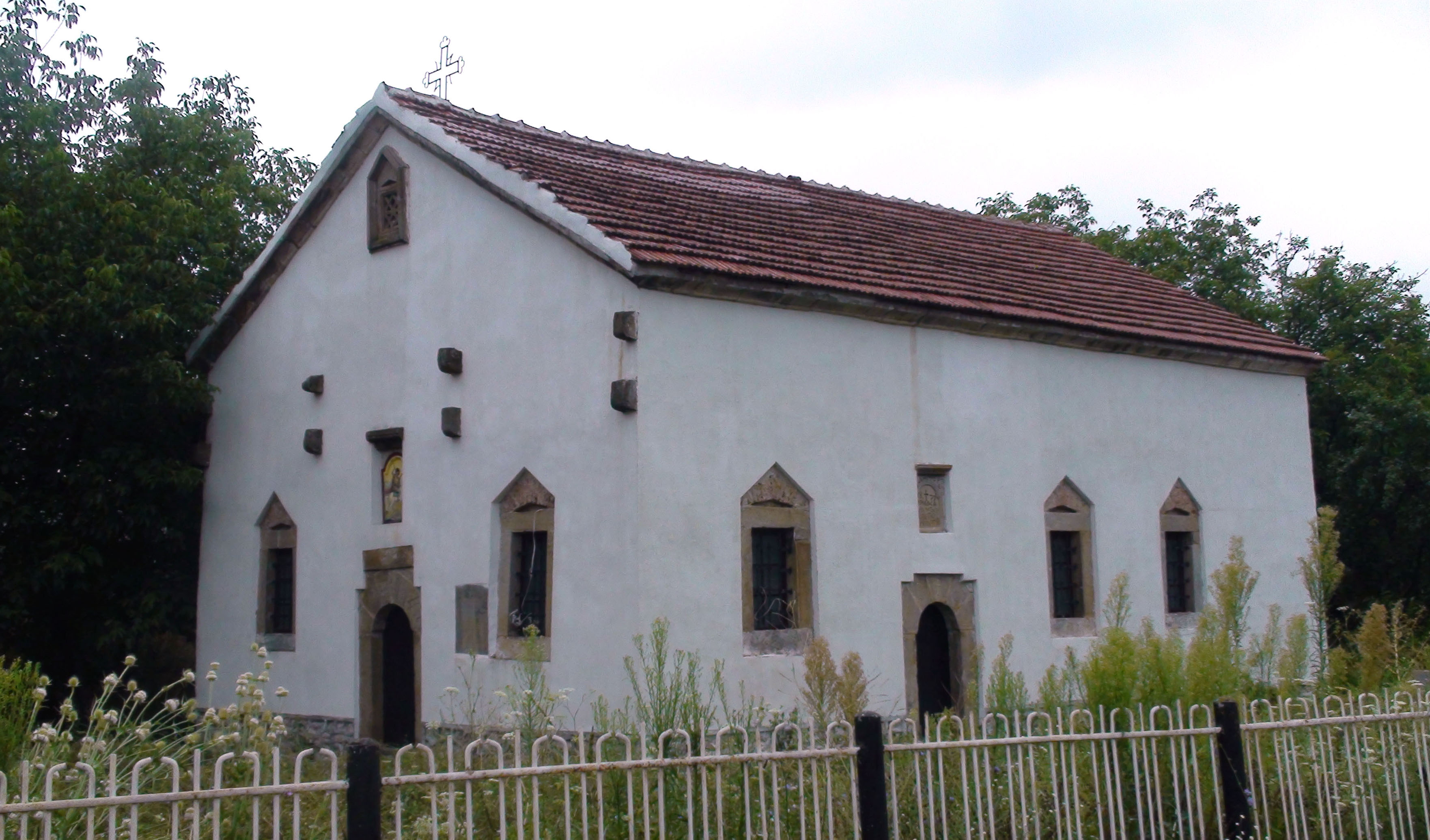
- Southwest view of the church

- Location within Bulgaria
- Location: Gavril Genovo, Georgi Damyanovo Municipality, Montana Province
- Country: Bulgaria
- Denomination: Bulgarian Orthodox

Architecture
- Architect: Alekso Angelkov
- Style: vernacular Gothic Revival
- Completed: 1873

Administration
- Diocese: Vidin Eparchy

Saint George's Church (Bulgarian: църква „Свети Георги“, tsarkva „Sveti Georgi“) is a church in Gavril Genovo, a village in northwestern Bulgaria, part of Georgi Damyanovo municipality, Montana Province. It was built in 1873 by the architect Alekso Angelkov of the Slavine Architectural School in the village of Sotochino, today one of the two neighbourhoods of Gavril Genovo. The church, otherwise a minor village parish church, is notable for its use of vernacular Gothic Revival features, a trademark approach of that school which set it apart from other architectural schools of the Bulgarian National Revival.

== History and authorship ==
The church's construction can be conclusively dated to 1873 due to an inscription on a slabstone above the south gate. The inscription reads: "18✝73 созида сѧ храмъ сеѝ светаго Георгѝ" ("18✝73 was built [this] church of Saint George"). The architect, Alekso Angelkov from Slavine, also constructed the Dormition of the Theotokos Cathedral in Pirot (1866–1870) and the Saint George's Church in Bistrilitsa (1890), one of the most elaborately decorated Gothic Revival churches of the Slavine School. The authorship of the Gavril Genovo church has been established thanks to another inscription just above the first one, which reads "Маисторъ Алексі" ("Master Aleksi").

== Architecture ==
Described as a "humble but beautiful village church", in terms of design Saint George's is a simple single-nave church which follows the typical single-nave design employed by the Slavine School. It has two gates, one from the south and one from the west, and nine relatively large windows which let a lot of light into the interior. The windows are of the more basic design used by Slavine School architects, with a simple sharp-pointed window bay, as opposed to a more complex (and also sharp-pointed) one. Such windows can be typically found on churches in poorer villages within the range of Slavine School activity. Their simplistic appearance is attributed to the limited financial resources of the congregation. The gates are also of a basic yet typical design.

Saint George's has a five-sided apse and at present lacks a dome, though it is not impossible that it had one at some point. The west facade of the church also has six stone corbels; these were installed in order to support a porch (an external narthex), which was either never built or did not survive. A characteristic detail of the church is the sharp-pointed window adorning the west side gable; it was hewn out of a single stone and boasts elaborate rosette grating.

== Decoration and icons ==
Saint George's Church has exterior stone relief decoration, another trademark feature of the Slavine School. The bays of the two gates are decorated with various ornaments, floral and solar rosettes. The west gate decoration includes a stylized depiction of the tree of life and an archaic image of two birds, one standing atop the other and pecking it, which is a medieval symbol of the fight between good and evil. Architect Nikolay Tuleshkov finds the appearance of such archaic imagery in the exterior decoration "puzzling".

The iconostasis was painted by Petar Mitov, an artist from Samokov, in 1874. Mitov also did one of the icons ("Synaxis of the Archangel Michael") in the church in 1875, as well as the crucifix behind the altar in 1874.

== Gallery ==
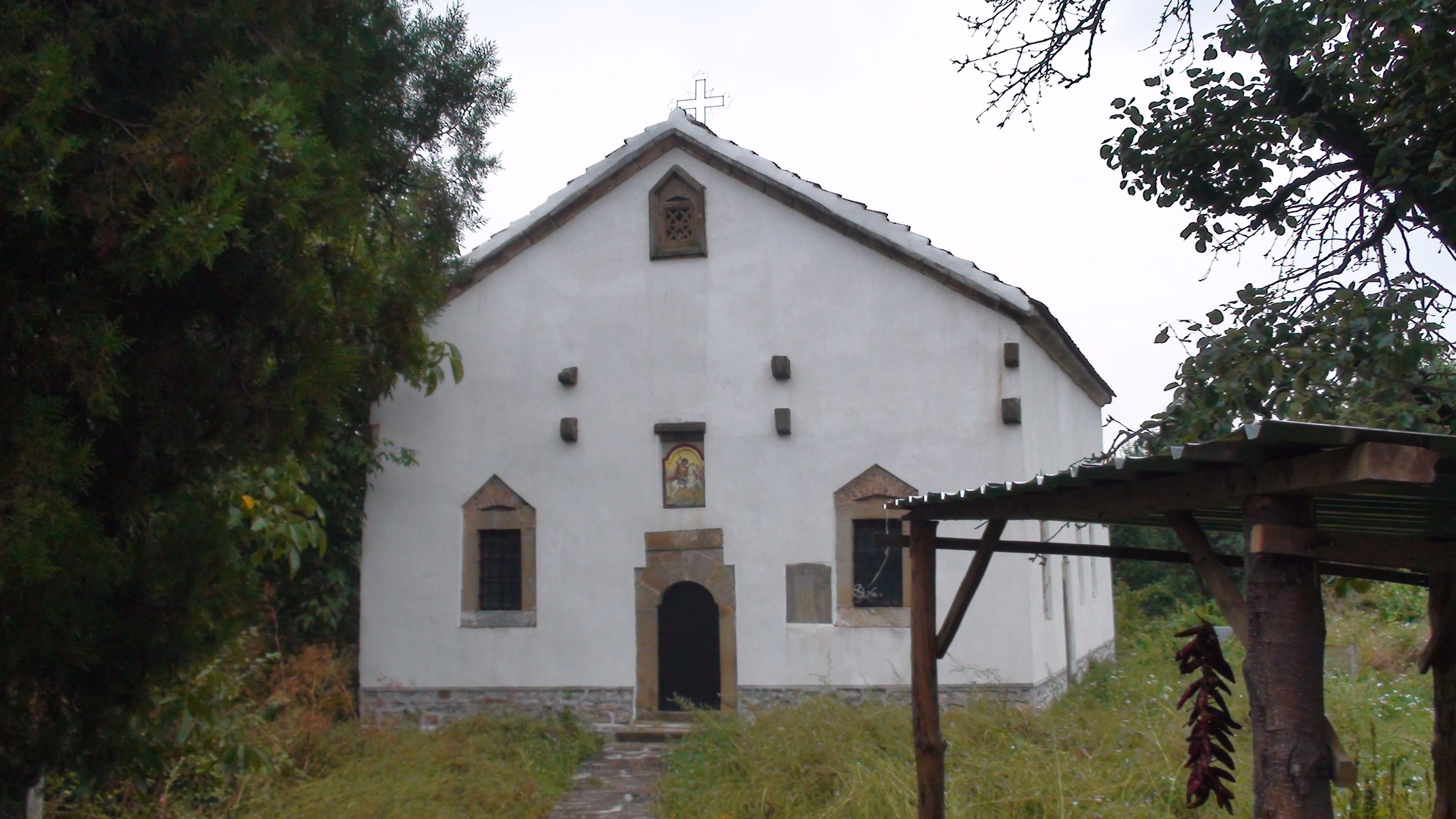
West facade

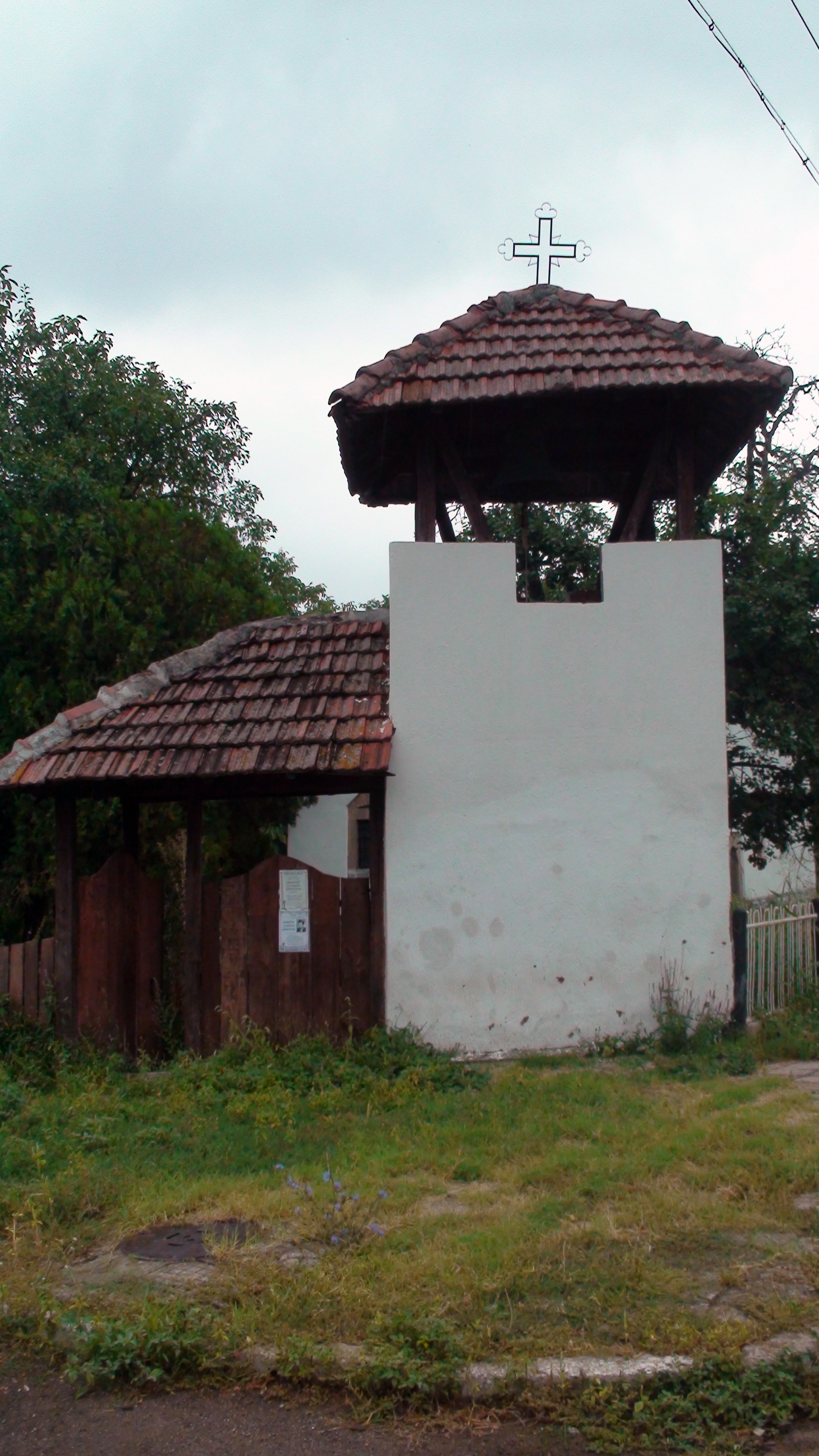
Bell tower

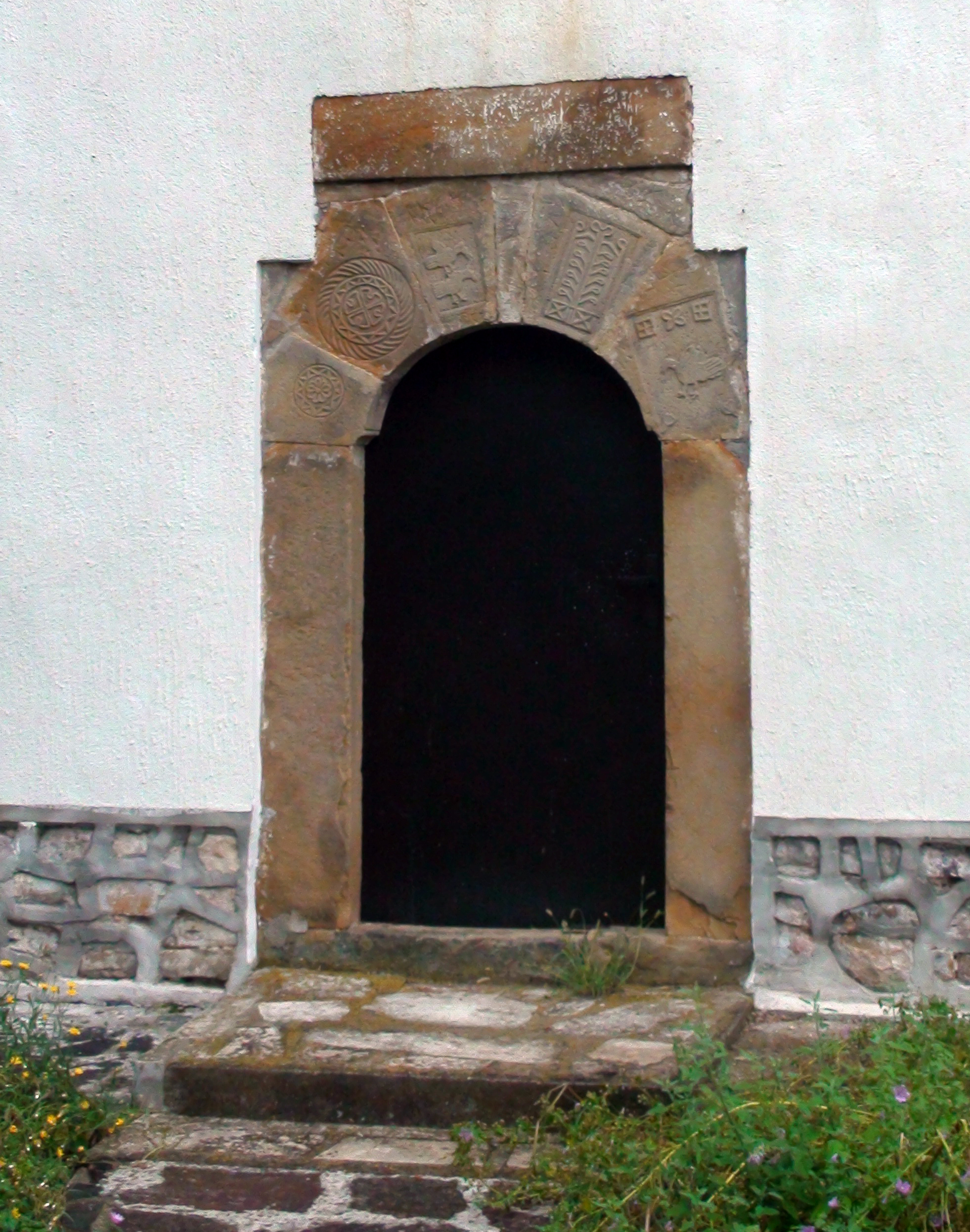
West gate with its archaic relief decoration

== See also ==
- Lopushna Monastery
- Vernacular adaptations of Gothic Revival

== Sources ==
- Тулешков, Николай (2007). Славинските първомайстори (in Bulgarian). София: Арх & Арт. ISBN 978-954-8931-40-3.
