= Etropole =

Etropole Етрополе
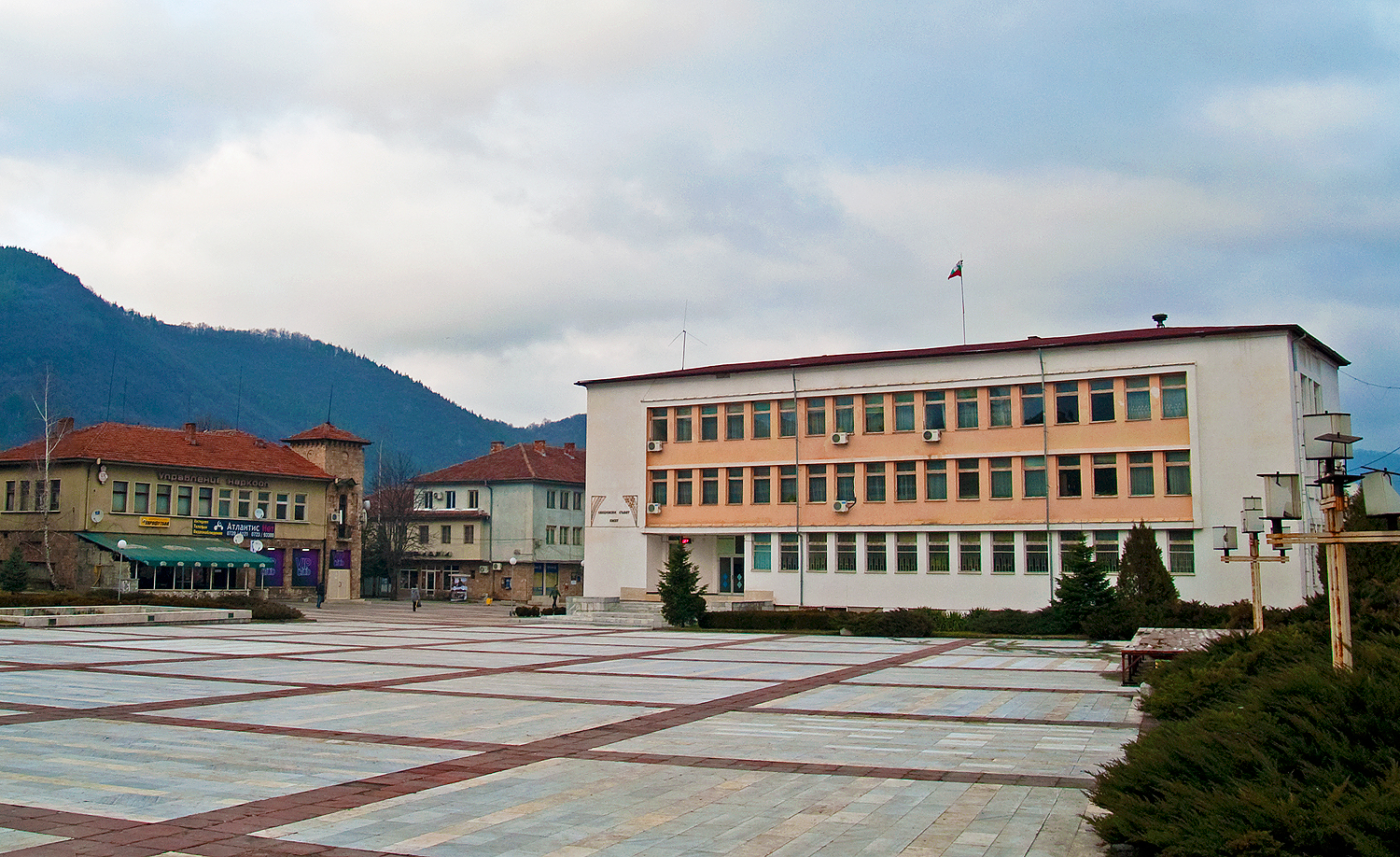
- Etropole Town-hall

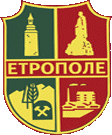
- Coat of arms

- Location of Etropole
- Coordinates: 42°50′N 24°0′E
- Country: Bulgaria
- Province (Oblast): Sofia

Government
  - Mayor: Milcho Tsatsov (NMSII)
- Elevation: 618 m (2,028 ft)

Population (13.09.2005)
  - Total: 12,218
- Time zone: UTC+2 (EET)
  - Summer (DST): UTC+3 (EEST)
- Postal Code: 2180
- Area code: 0720

Etropole (Bulgarian: Етрополе, pronounced [ˈɛtropolɛ]) is a town in western Bulgaria, part of Sofia Province. It is located close to the northern slopes of the Balkan Mountains in the valley of the Iskar River, 80 km (49.71 mi) from Sofia.

== History ==
The area was first settled by the Thracian tribe of the Triballi in the 7th or 6th century BC due to its position as an important crossroad connecting the Danube with Macedonia and Thrace close to two key Balkan passes. The forces of Philip II of Macedon (339 BC), Alexander the Great (335 BC), the Celts and the Roman legions passed through the valley in the Antiquity. The region developed as a centre of trade and economy, as evidenced by findings of Macedonian and Greek coins, Greek ceramics, luxurious items and decorations.

The ore ledges brought Saxon miners to the town in the 16th century. They introduced the samokov hammer technology and helped for the area's establishment as a centre of craftsmanship and mining, with gold, copper, silver and iron being extracted in the 16th and 17th centuries. Handicrafts such as iron-, gold- and coppersmithing and cutlery prospered. The economic upsurge of the settlement aided the development of culture and education in the nearby Etropole Monastery in the period, where biblical and liturgical books were copied in a specific original calligraphic style, of which 76 hand-written volumes were preserved.

A monastery school was established in 1613 and a public one (yet still monastery) followed in 1811. One of the first school buildings in Bulgaria was constructed in 1828-1830 by merchants and rich craftsmen from Etropole. A revolutionary committee part of Vasil Levski's Internal Revolutionary Organization was founded in Etropole in 1870 in order to help the Liberation of Bulgaria from Ottoman rule. The town was liberated on 24 November 1877 by Russian forces under Joseph Vladimirovich Gourko during the Russo-Turkish War of 1877-78 and served as a governing centre for the 40-day winter march of the Balkan Mountains of the Imperial Russian Army.

Etropole Peak on Livingston Island in the South Shetland Islands, Antarctica is named after Etropole.

== Places of interest ==
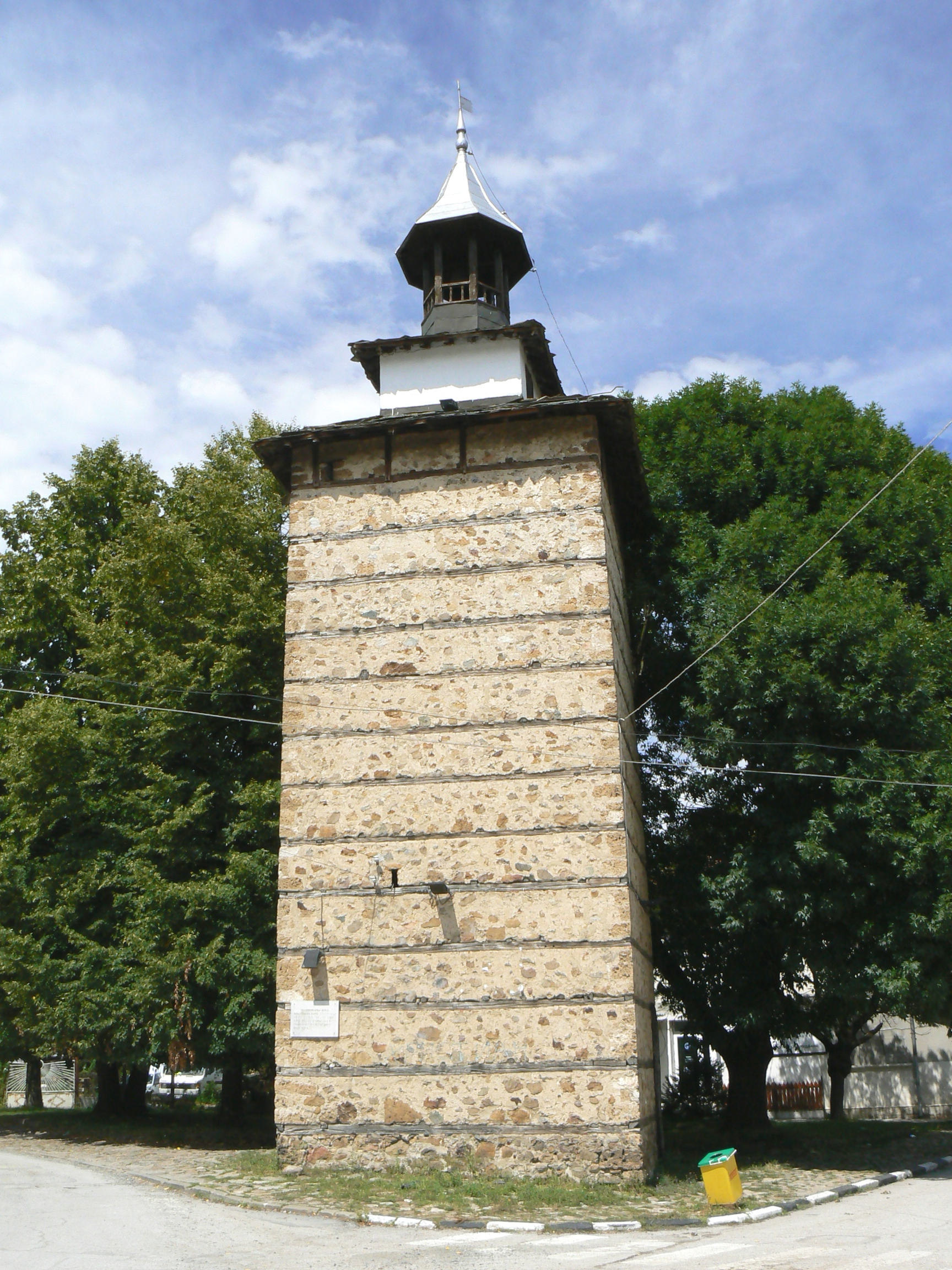
The Clock tower

The clockwork tower of Etropole built in 1710 is one of the oldest in Bulgaria. It originally served as a defensive structure until in 1821 a master builder by the name of Dido reconstructed it as a clock tower. With its height at about 20 metres (66 ft) it stands above most of the buildings in the small town. The clockwork tower is one of the 100 Tourist Sites of Bulgaria along with the Monastery of the Holy Trinity and the History museum of Etropole.

The Etropole Monastery, also known as Varovitets, is located 5 km (3 mi) from the town. It is a Bulgarian Orthodox monastery and was founded in the 12th or 13th century. The monastery is also the home of the spectacular Etropole Waterfall “Varovitets”.

To learn more about the history of Etropole you can visit the Historical Museum of Etropole. The History Museum in Etropole launched its first exhibition in 1958. Ten years later, in 1968, the second exhibition of the museum was opened in the restored building of the former Turkish police office. The museum of Etropole is still housed there. The building was constructed in the period 1853 – 1870. This is the second public building in Etropole after the Clock Tower (1710) that has survived to this day. The ten halls of the museum tell about the past of the Etropole Region.

The village of Lopyan (Лопян) is located in the Etropole municipality and is situated at the foot of the northern slopes of the Central Balkan Mountain. It is one of the oldest villages in the region and its story began at the time of the Thracians, when the territory was inhabited by the tribe Luposi from where name of the village most likely origins. Three kilometres from Lopyan are the remains of the Thracian fortress Chertigrad (built in 4th or 3rd centuries BC and probably functioned until the 6th century AD).

== Notable people ==
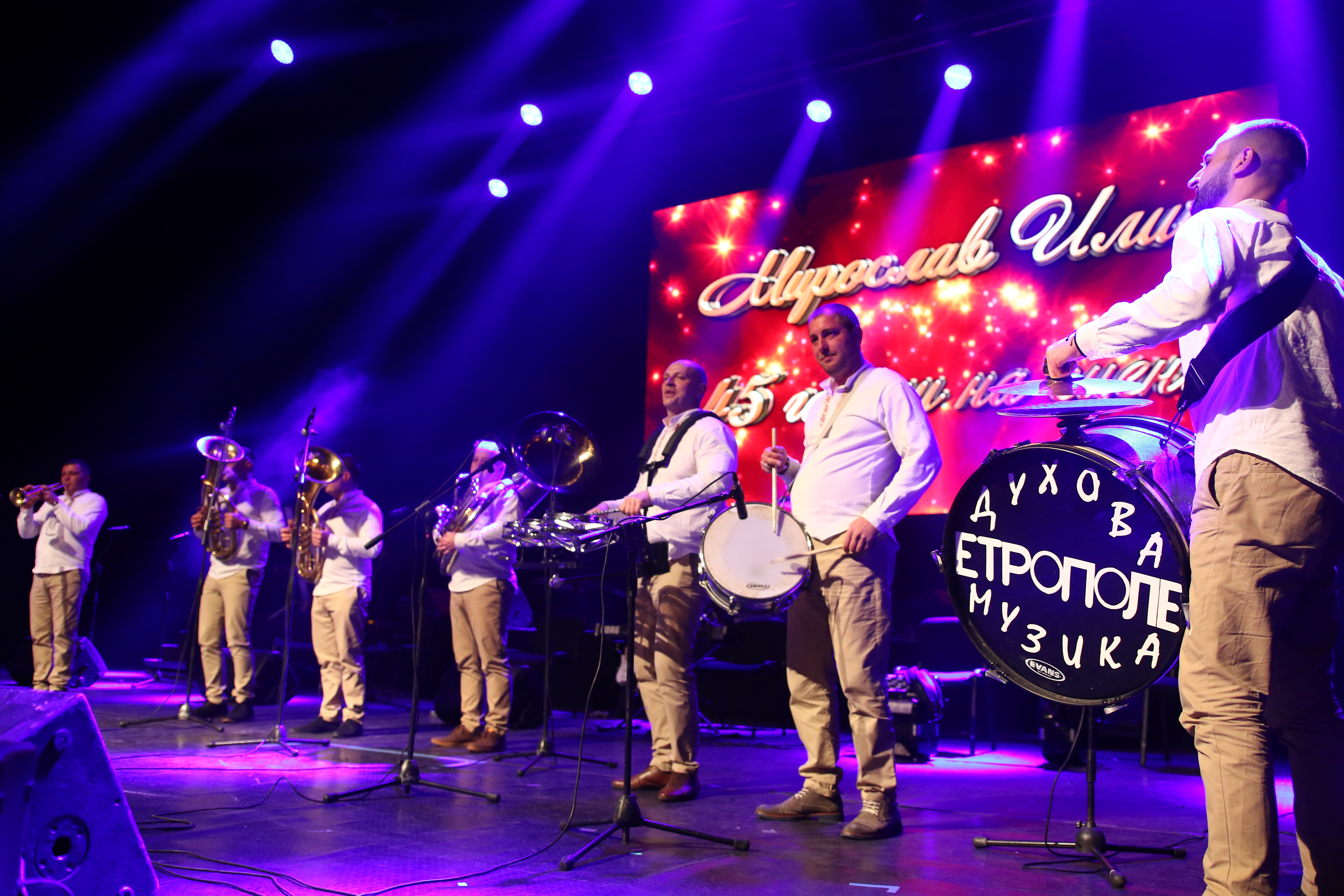
Brass band Etropole

- Todor Peev (1842–1904) - revolutionary
- Hristo Yasenov (1889–1925) - poet
- Sofi Marinova - singer of Roma descent

== Twin towns ==
Etropole is twinned with:

- Feres, Greece
- Mozhaysk, Russia
- Bela Palanka, Serbia

== Gallery ==
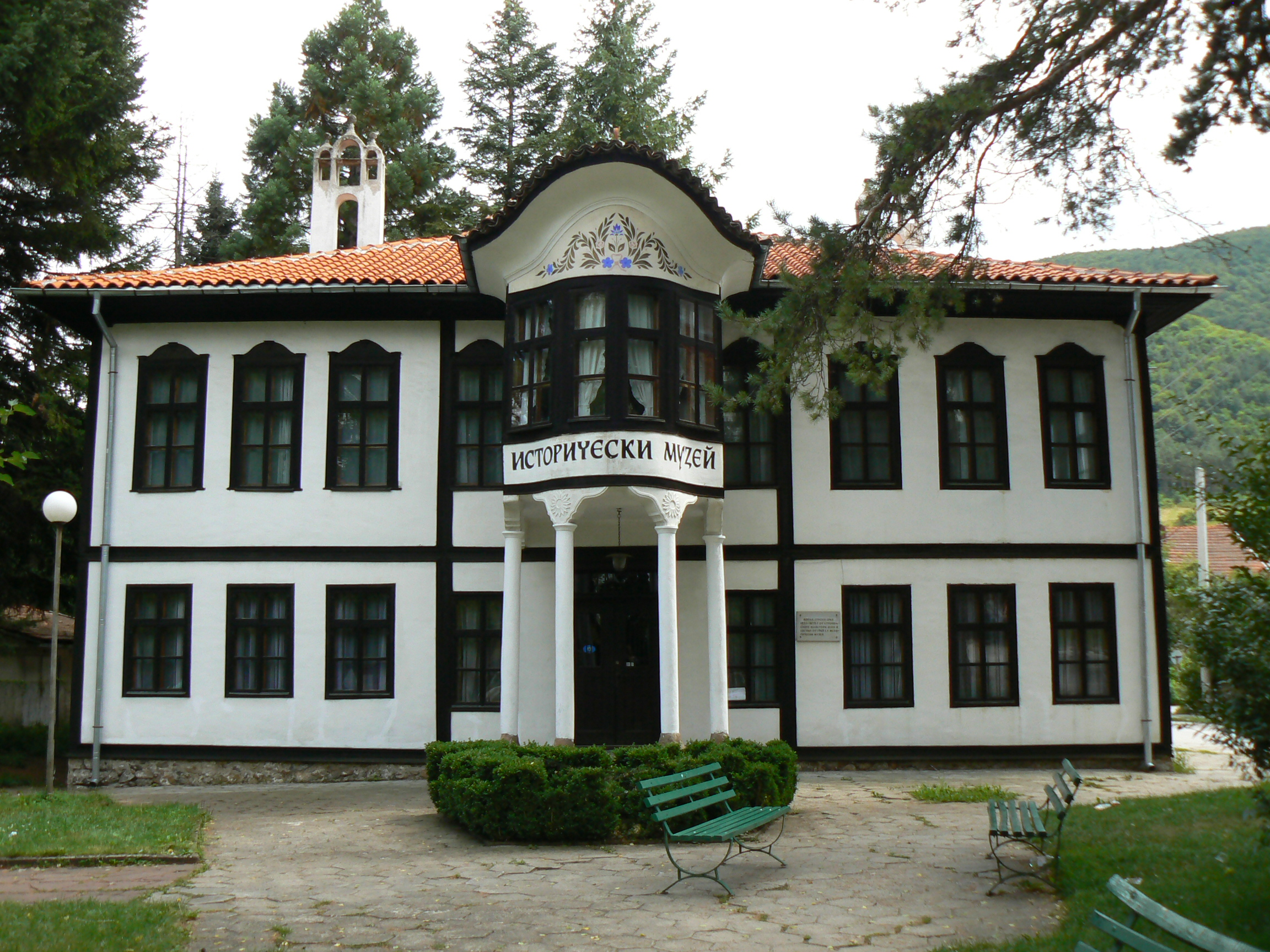
Historical Museum (built 1853–1870)

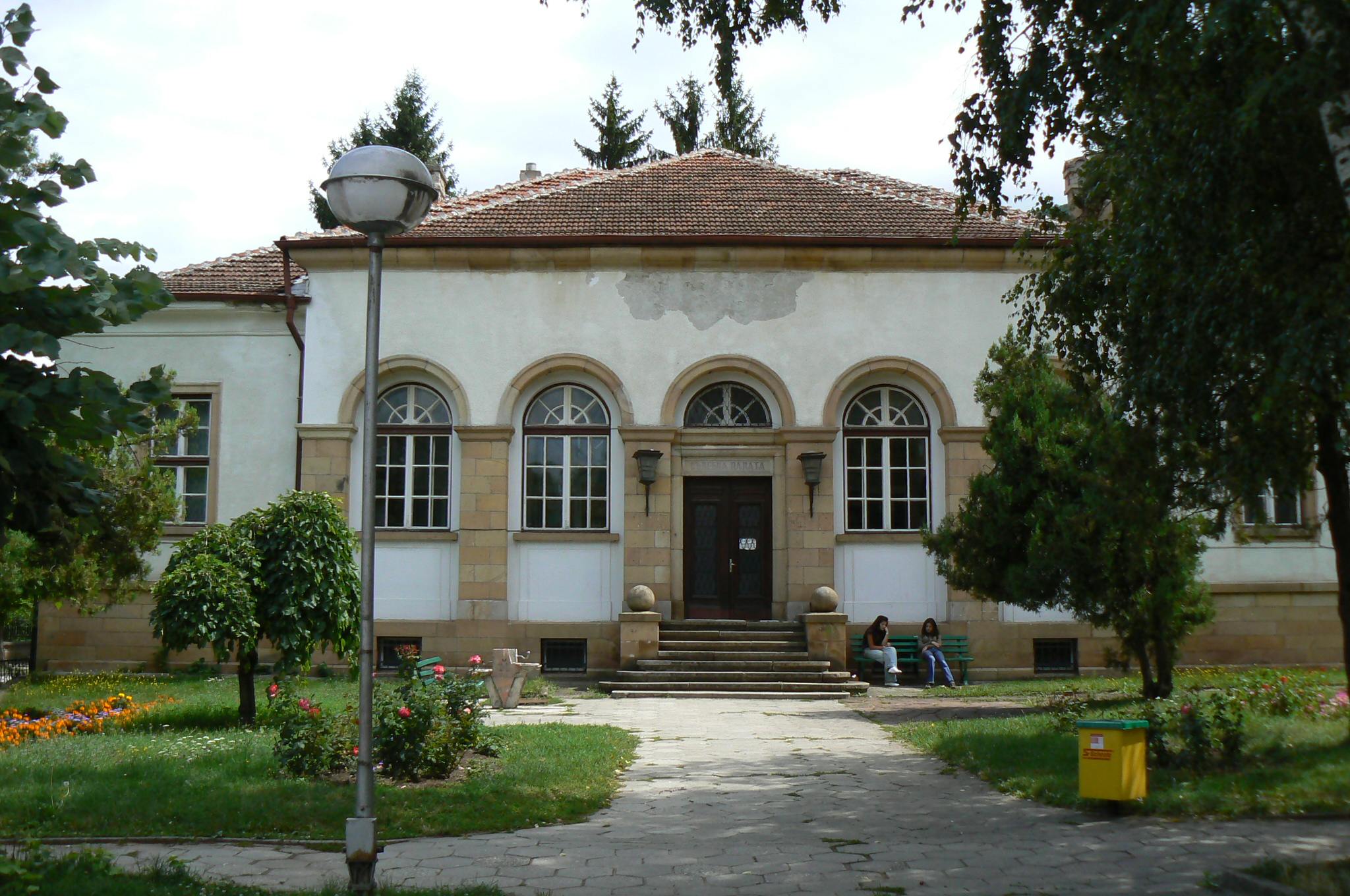
Courthouse

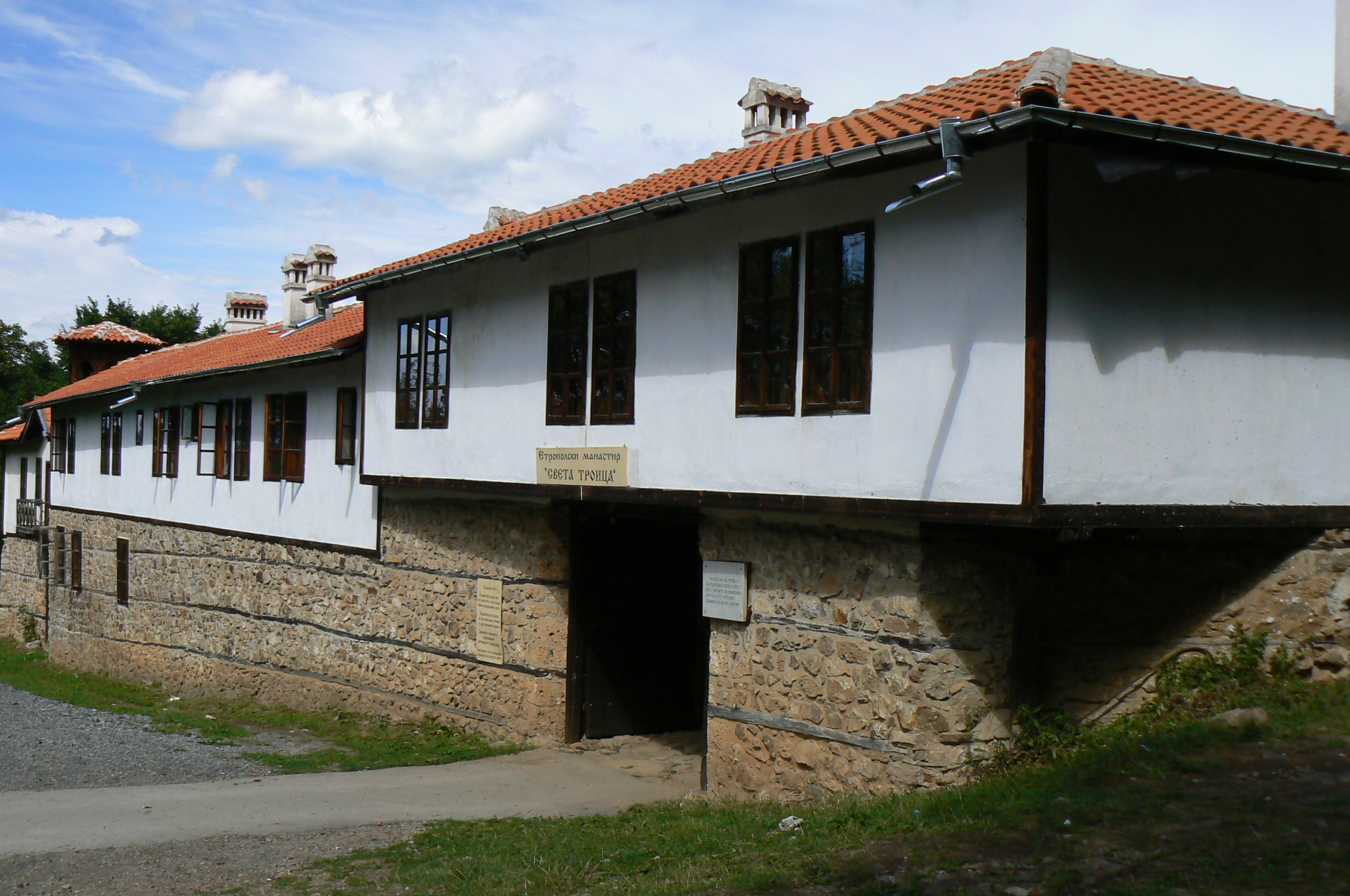
Etropole Monastery of the Holy Trinity

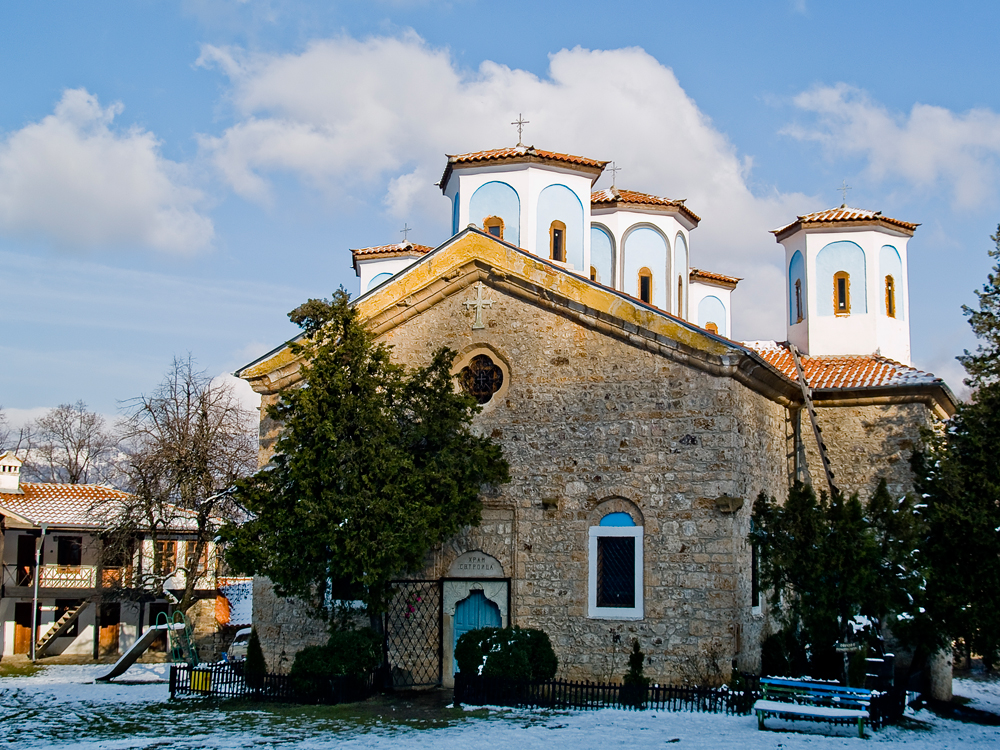
Etropole Monastery Church

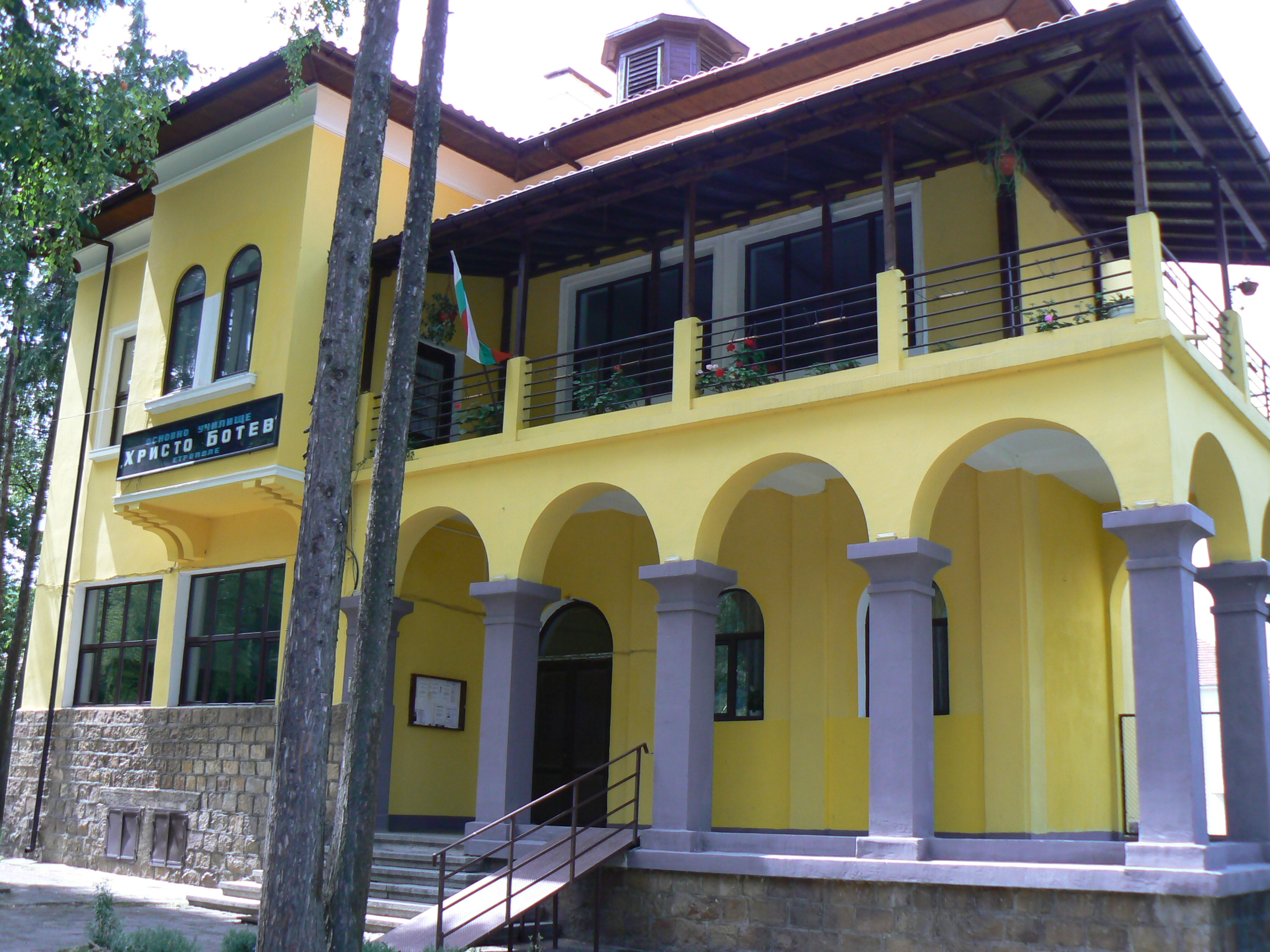
Hristo Botev school

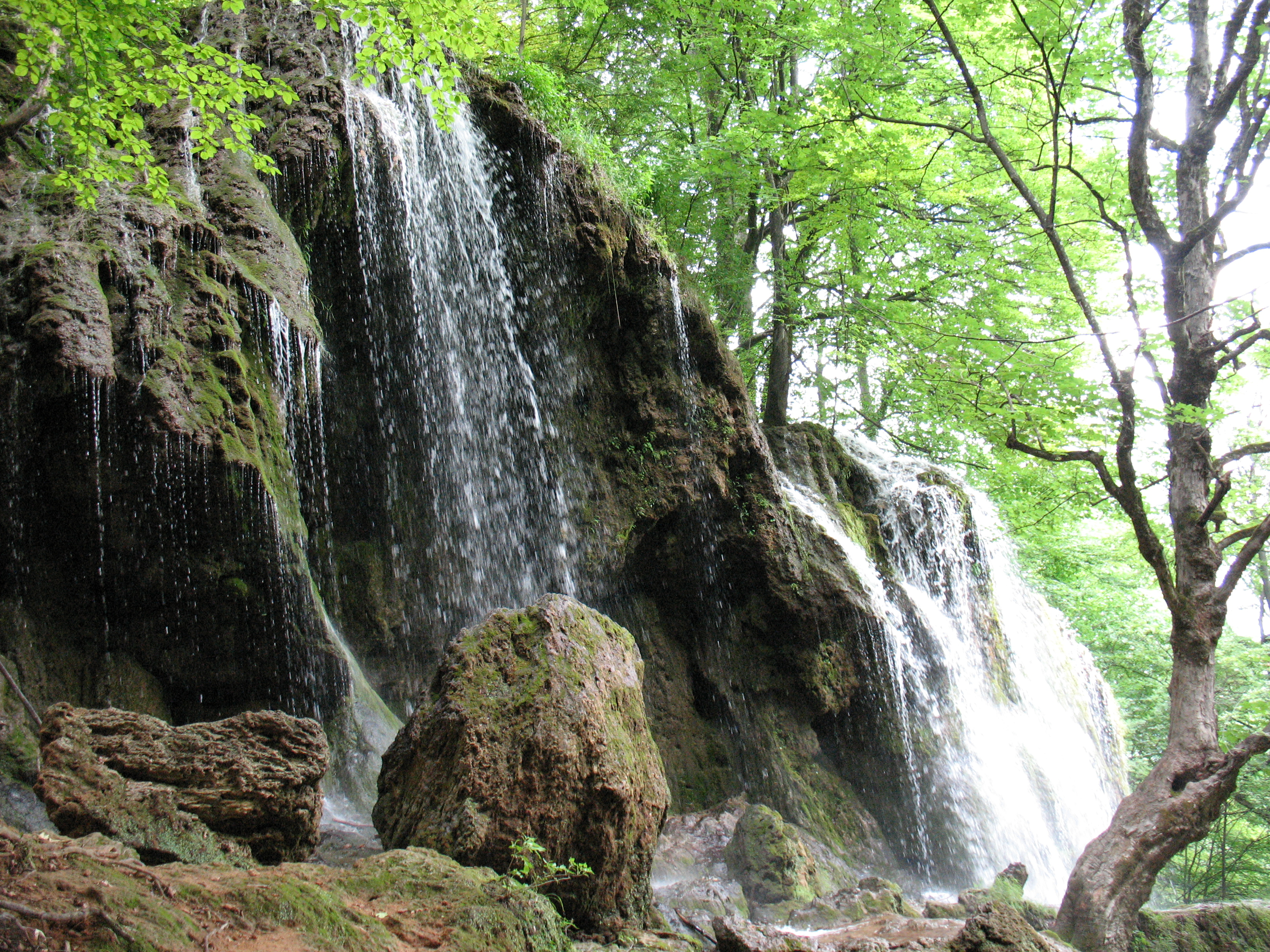
Varovitets Waterfall
