= Kopilovtsi, Montana Province =

Kopilovtsi Копиловци (Област Монтана)
- Village
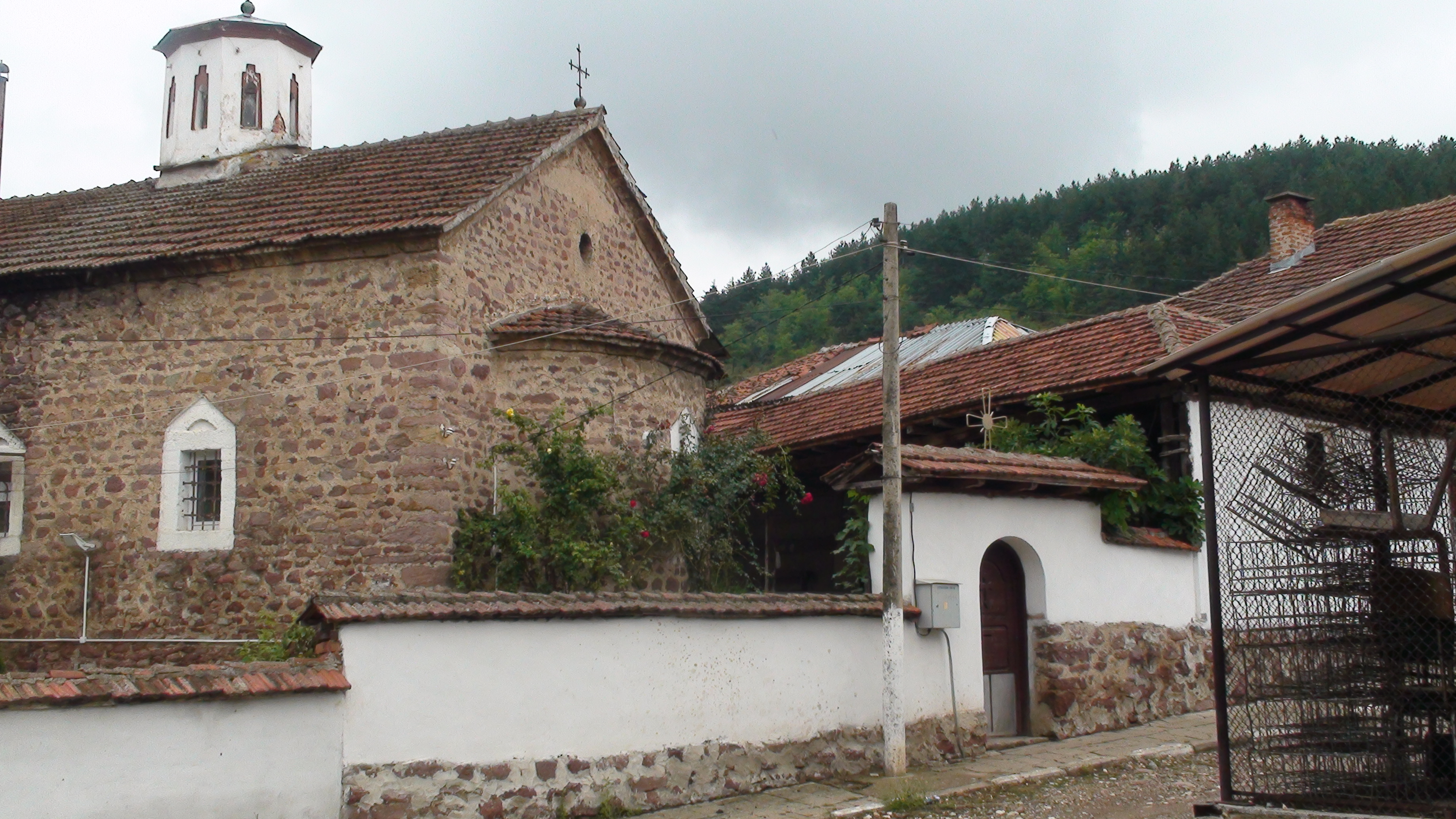

- Location within Bulgaria
- Coordinates: 43.3333°N 22.9167°E
- Country: Bulgaria
- Province: Montana Province
- Municipality: Georgi Damyanovo
- Time zone: UTC+2 (EET)
  - Summer (DST): UTC+3 (EEST)

Kopilovtsi is a village in Georgi Damyanovo Municipality, Montana Province, north-western Bulgaria.

== History ==
Some documents like those of Catholic priests and bishops prove the Albanian origin of the population living in the mining village of Kopilovtsi. The documents prove that the population of the village spoke Albanian by the sixteenth century. In its relation to Rome In 1640, a Catholic Bulgarian from Chiprovtsi named Petar Bogdan wrote to Catholic authorities in Rome about Kopilovtsi and stated that "Catholic sacrament has 1,200 people, 360 children, I can tell by nationality Albanians, because they came long ago from Albania and even now keep this language”. Bogdani writes about the village several times later focusing on the growth of Catholic Albanian population. In 1653, he wrote to Church authorities in Rome that almost all the villagers were traders.
