= Georgi Damyanovo Municipality =

Georgi Damyanovo Municipality Община Георги Дамяново
- Municipality
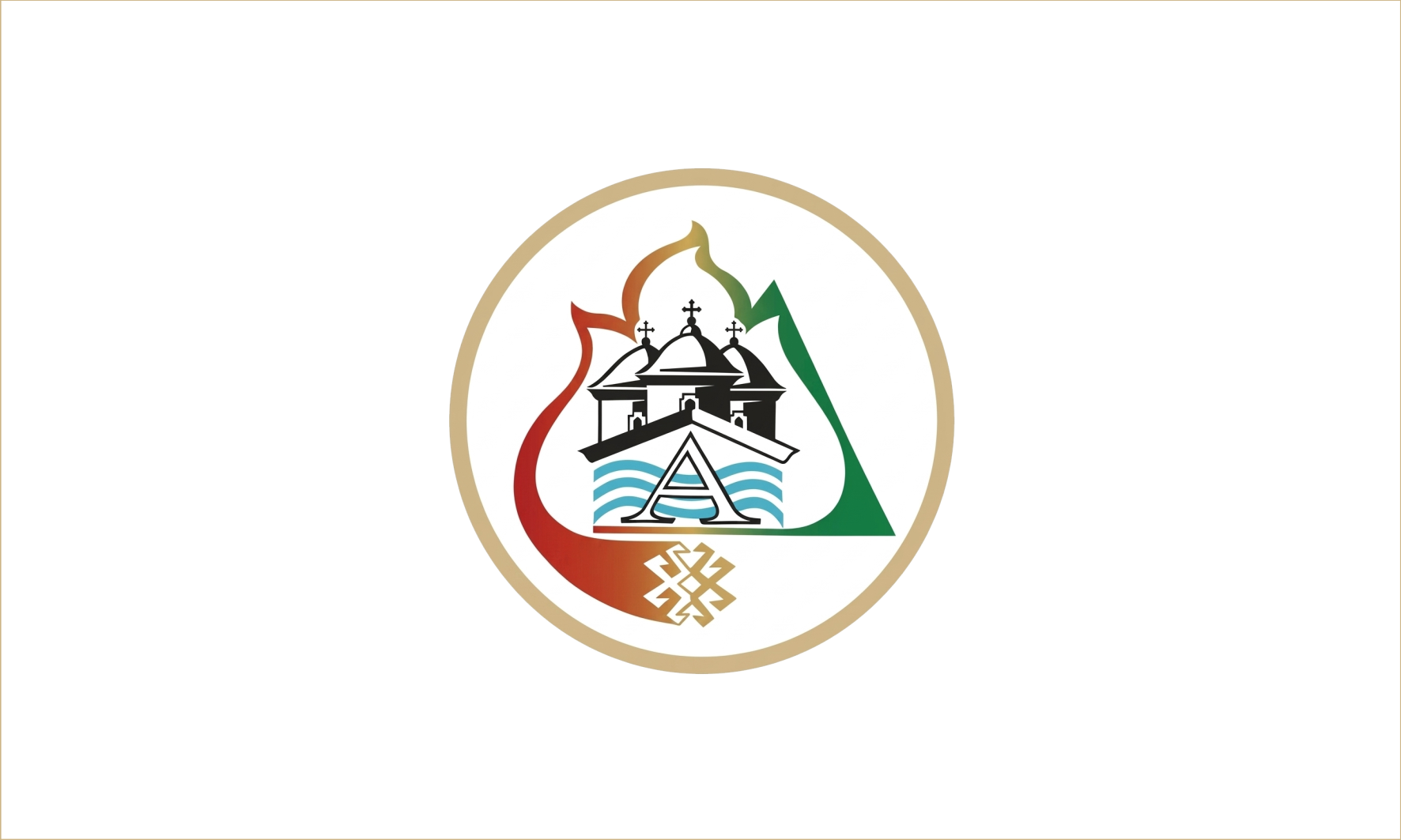
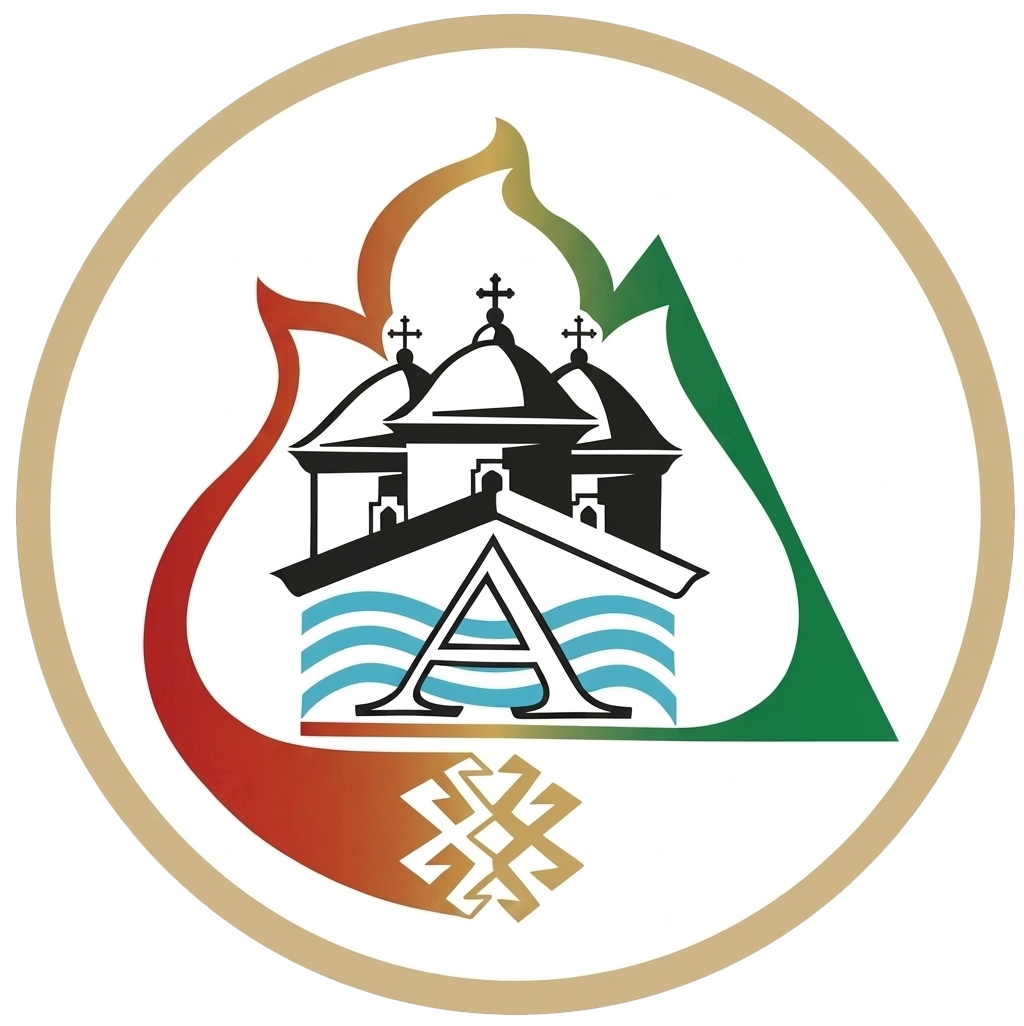
- Flag Coat of arms

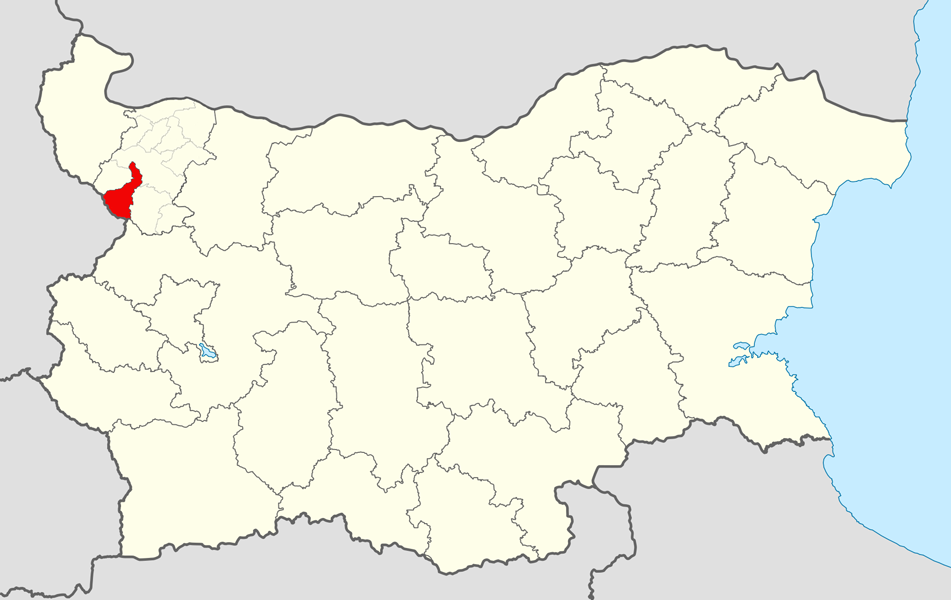
- Georgi Damyanovo Municipality within Bulgaria and Montana Province.
- Coordinates: 43°19′N 23°0′E
- Country: Bulgaria
- Province (Oblast): Montana
- Admin. centre (Obshtinski tsentar): Georgi Damyanovo

Area
  - Total: 298 km^{2} (115 sq mi)

Population (Census February 2011)
  - Total: 2,739
  - Density: 9.19/km^{2} (23.8/sq mi)
- Time zone: UTC+2 (EET)
  - Summer (DST): UTC+3 (EEST)

Georgi Damyanovo Municipality (Bulgarian: Община Георги Дамяново) is a frontier municipality (obshtina) in Montana Province, Northwestern Bulgaria, located on the northern slopes of western Stara Planina mountain and the area of the so-called Fore-Balkan. It is named after its administrative centre - the village of Georgi Damyanovo. In the southwest, the municipality borders on Republic of Serbia.

The municipality embraces a territory of 298 km^{2} (115 sq mi) with a population of 2,739 inhabitants, as of February 2011.

== Settlements ==
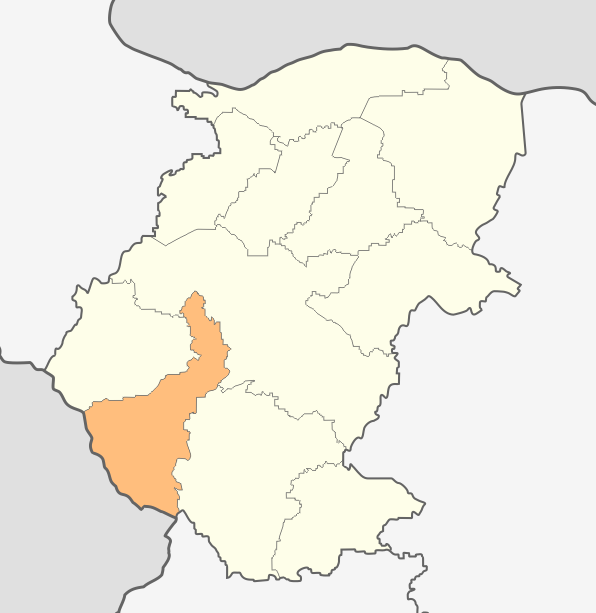
Georgi Damyanovo Municipality within Montana Province

Georgi Damyanovo Municipality includes the following 13 places all of them villages:

Town/Village	Cyrillic	Population (December 2009)
Georgi Damyanovo	Георги Дамяново	566
Chemish	Чемиш	81
Diva Slatina	Дива Слатина	131
Dalgi Del	Дълги дел	191
Elovitsa	Еловица	51
Gavril Genovo	Гаврил Геново	337
Glavanovtsi	Главановци	76
Govezhda	Говежда	503
Kamenna Riksa	Каменна Рикса	172
Kopilovtsi	Копиловци	579
Melyane	Меляне	187
Pomezhdin	Помеждин	21
Vidlitsa	Видлица	127
Total		3,022

== Demography ==
The following table shows the change of the population during the last four decades.

Georgi Damyanovo Municipality
Year	1975	1985	1992	2001	2005	2007	2009	2011
Population	8,739	6,524	5,577	4,462	3,419	3,216	3,022	2,739
Sources: Census 2001, Census 2011, „pop-stat.mashke.org“,

=== Religion ===
According to the latest Bulgarian census of 2011, the religious composition, among those who answered the optional question on religious identification, was the following:

Religious composition of Georgi Damyanovo Municipality
Orthodox Christianity	97.9%
Catholicism	0.3%
Protestantism	0.2%
Islam	0.0%
No religion	0.4%
Prefer not to answer, others and indefinable	1.2%

== See also ==
- Provinces of Bulgaria
- Municipalities of Bulgaria
- List of cities and towns in Bulgaria
