= Etropole Waterfall =

Coordinates: 42°49′27″N 24°2′19″E

- Етрополски водопад
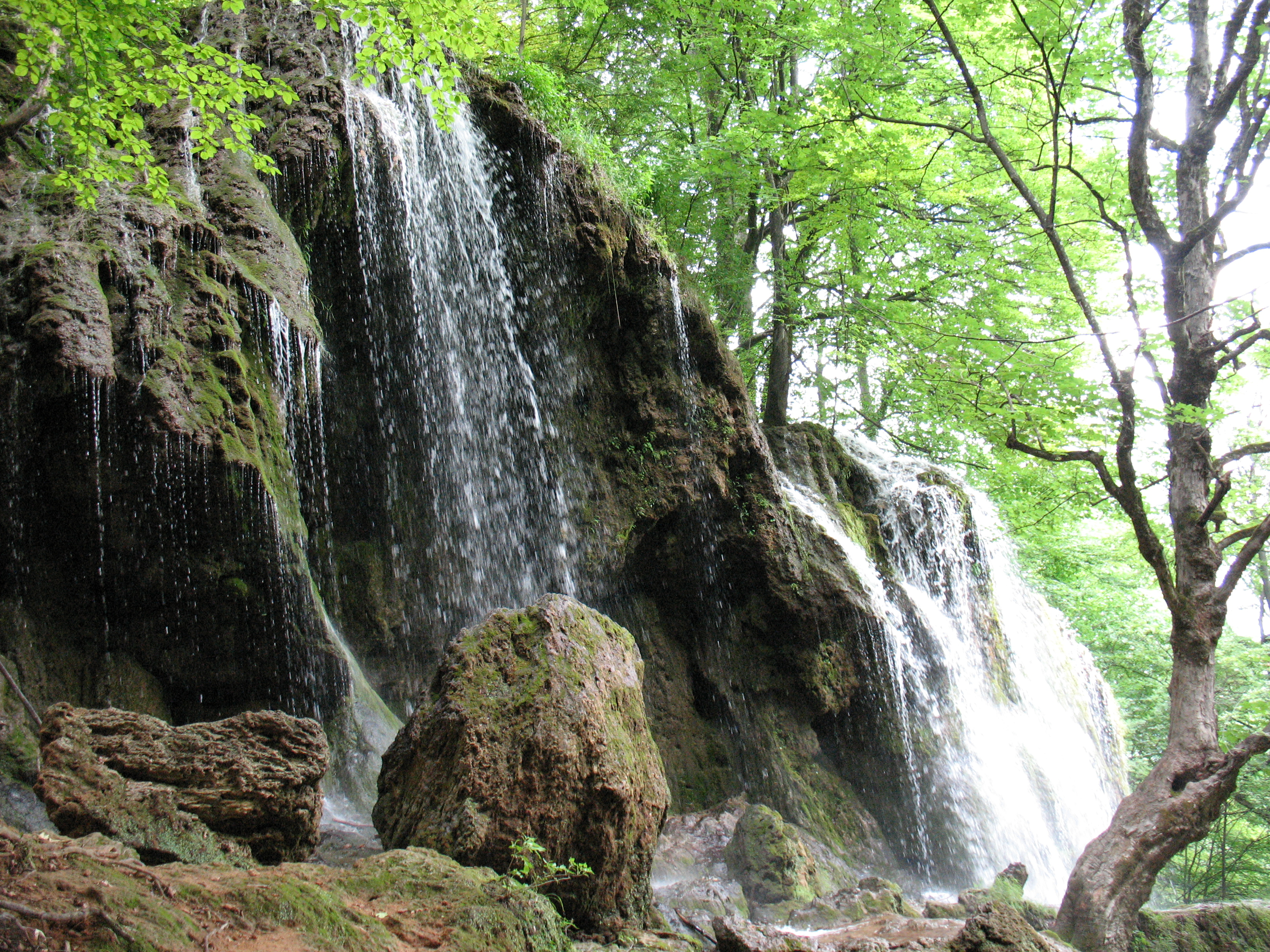
- Etropole Waterfall
- Interactive map of Etropole Waterfall
- Location: Balkan Mountains, Bulgaria

Etropole Waterfall (Bulgarian: Етрополски водопад), known also as Varovitets (Варовитец) is a waterfall in the Balkan Mountains, Bulgaria, located near the Etropole Monastery. It is situated on the Malki Iskar River, which flows near the monastery. The drop from the waterfall is roughly 15 meters(49.2 feet).

== See also ==
- List of waterfalls
