= Gavril Genovo =

Village in northwestern Bulgaria

Coordinates: 43°24′4″N 23°3′44″E

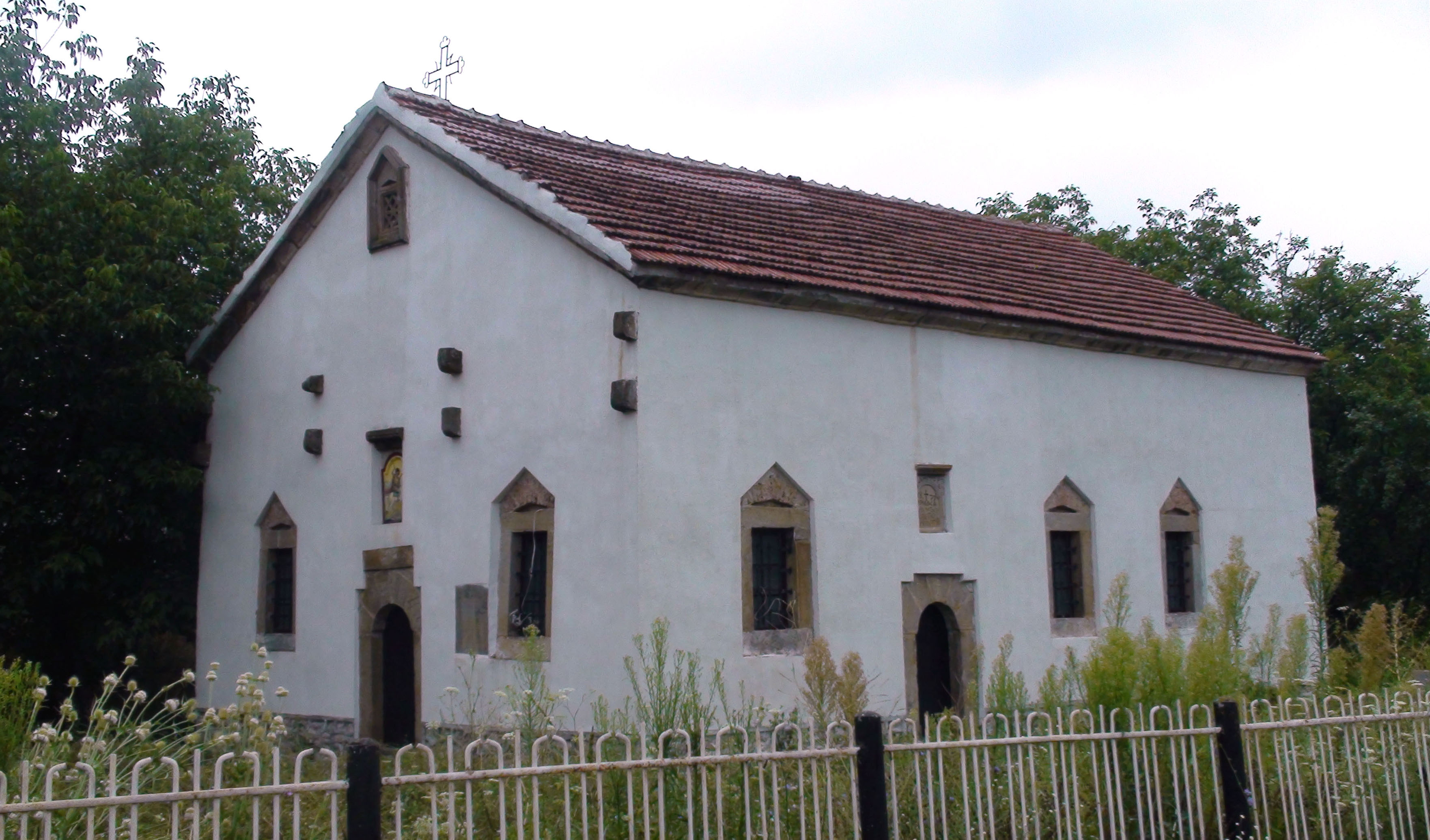
Saint George's Church, Gavril Genovo

Gavril Genovo (Bulgarian: Гаврил Геново) is a village in northwestern Bulgaria, part of Georgi Damyanovo Municipality, Montana Province. It was formed in 1955 through the merger of Sotochino and Ilitsa (pre-1934 Sarblyanitsa). It was named after September Uprising leader Gavril Genov.

Sotochino was first recorded in 1607 while Sarblyanitsa ("Sarbitsa") was first mentioned in 1576. The two villages were described in 1666 as small neighbouring settlements that had six and eight houses each. In 1881, Sotochino had 64 houses and a population of 408 while Sarblyanitsa was inhabited by 260 people and had 36 houses. At the time, the villages had a Christian majority, though the population also included a total of 9 Muslims.

The church in Sotochino was built in 1873 in a Gothic Revival style.
