= Govezhda =

Govezhda Говежда
- Village
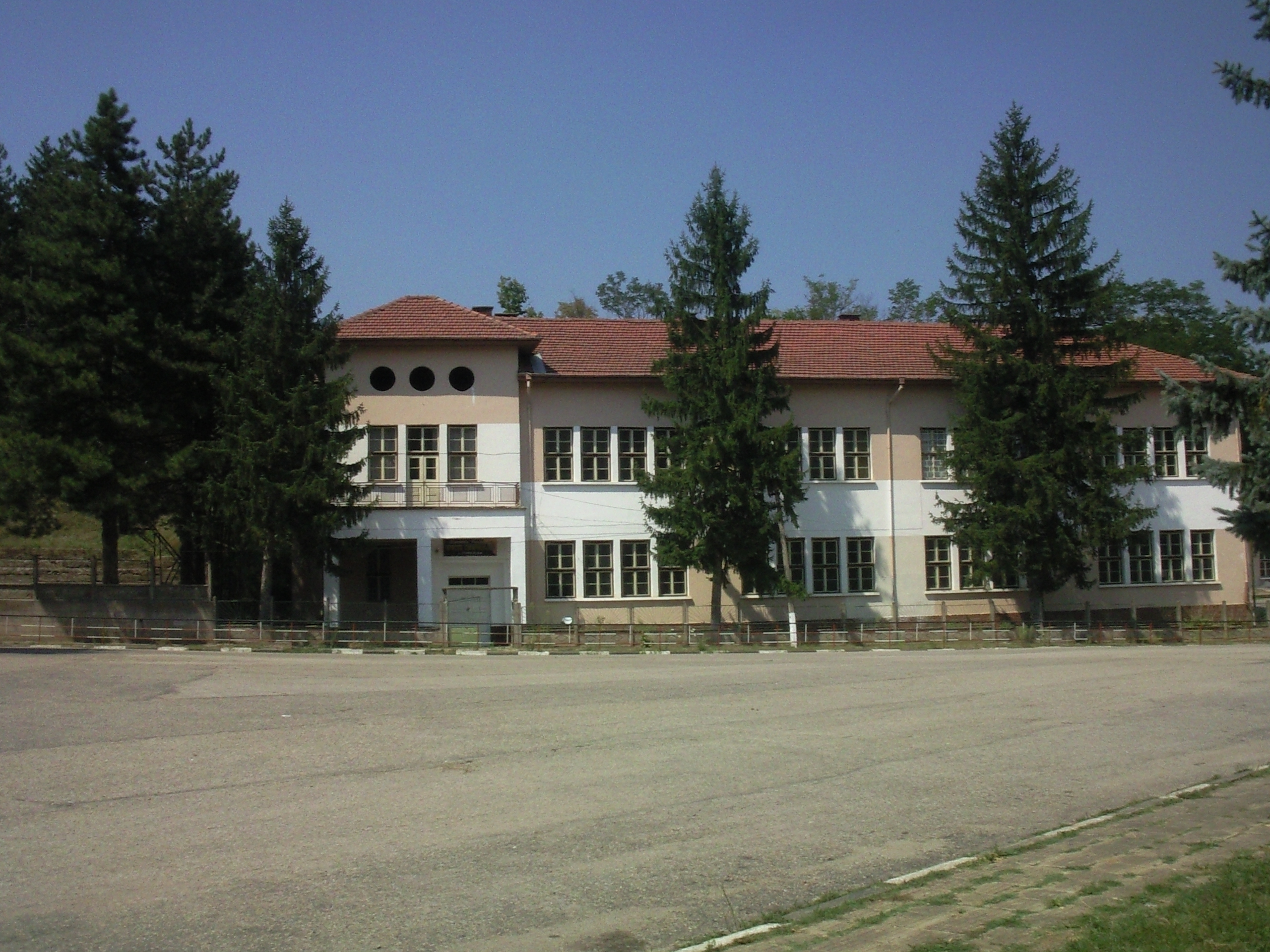
- Village centre to be Govezhda

- Location within Bulgaria
- Coordinates: 43°18′N 22°58′E
- Country: Bulgaria
- Province: Montana Province
- Municipality: Georgi Damyanovo
- Time zone: UTC+2 (EET)
  - Summer (DST): UTC+3 (EEST)

Govezhda is a village in Georgi Damyanovo Municipality, Montana Province, Northwestern Bulgaria.

The mountain village is located in the valley of the upper stream of the Ogosta river. It is located on the two sides of the river Ogosta, the 2 parts are connected by 2 concrete and 2 rope bridges. The modern village is thought to be found around 15-16th century, but the area has been populated long before by the Thracian Triballi tribes.

== History ==
The remains of "Cherno gradishte" (Black fortress) are located 2.08 km southeast of the village center. It is an antique Thracian and later Roman fortress, built on a single elevation with very steep slopes dominating over the area, with very good visibility in all directions and visual connection with the other surrounding fortresses.

Many years ago in this mountainous area there were numerous flocks of sheep which were roaming freely near the river. The legend says that an old shepherd grazed his flock in the area. One day his dogs began to bark, which meant there was some danger or people approaching. These were foreigners. They stopped at the old man and presented themselves as Royal Roman messengers who walked around the growing Empire. One of them stared at the shepherd's leather bag from which a shiny stick appeared. He asked where it was from and the shepherd replied that he found it in the nearby river. They looked at it with amazement as it was pure gold. The shepherd said he has found many other smaller pieces of gold around the river. The Royal messengers hurried to tell their master that there was nuggets of pure gold in this area, bringing him the golden stick they found, and not long after that workers came. The rubbing of the grains started near the village of nowadays village of Govedzhda. The workers were Thracian men and women that were turned into slaves - they were forced to work separately. There was only one day in the year when all men and women were allowed to meet. This day was called "Svidnya" which continues to be celebrated even today by the locals.

The enslaved Triballi swirled the sand and gathered golden grains, others like ants were tossing the stones to the top of the heaps, staggering, falling under the slashing whips. The heaps were growing fast. The legend tells that the masters of the Romans brought a blind granny to swing ninety nine baby swings while the women worked. She swung all the swings and cursed with the words "God is not foolish, the King is not righteous. If we could get rid of this weight..."

It happened that the Emperor himself visited these lands, this was Emperor Octavian Augustus. He wasn't happy about what he saw and ordered all women to be released. For gratitude, they named the river after his name - Augusta (Ogosta).

The stacks of stones start from Popov Bridge and continue 15 km after it. This is a monument of the human grief.

The river bed has been shifted several times, which explains why the heaps are located in parallel in several rows. Their length is 40-50 meters, they are 15-20 inches wide and 4-5 meters high. Millions of cubes of stones were moved, millions of tons of sand were shed, assuming about 40 tons of gold for an approximate period of 300 years.

At that time, the gold mines in the region of Kopilovtsi were also developed with slave labor. With a hammer and chisels they smashed the stones, descending into the bowels of the earth, and then carrying the ores with bags. They crushed the stones to sand, then blew it in stone troughs in a pond called "Plavarsky".
