= Vidlitsa =

Vidlitsa Видлица
- Village
- Location within Bulgaria
- Coordinates: 43°25′N 23°04′E
- Country: Bulgaria
- Province: Montana Province
- Municipality: Georgi Damyanovo
- Time zone: UTC+2 (EET)
  - Summer (DST): UTC+3 (EEST)

Vidlitsa is a village in Georgi Damyanovo Municipality, Montana Province, north-western Bulgaria.
