= Etropole Monastery =

Orthodox monastery in Bulgaria

Etropole Monastery of the Holy Trinity
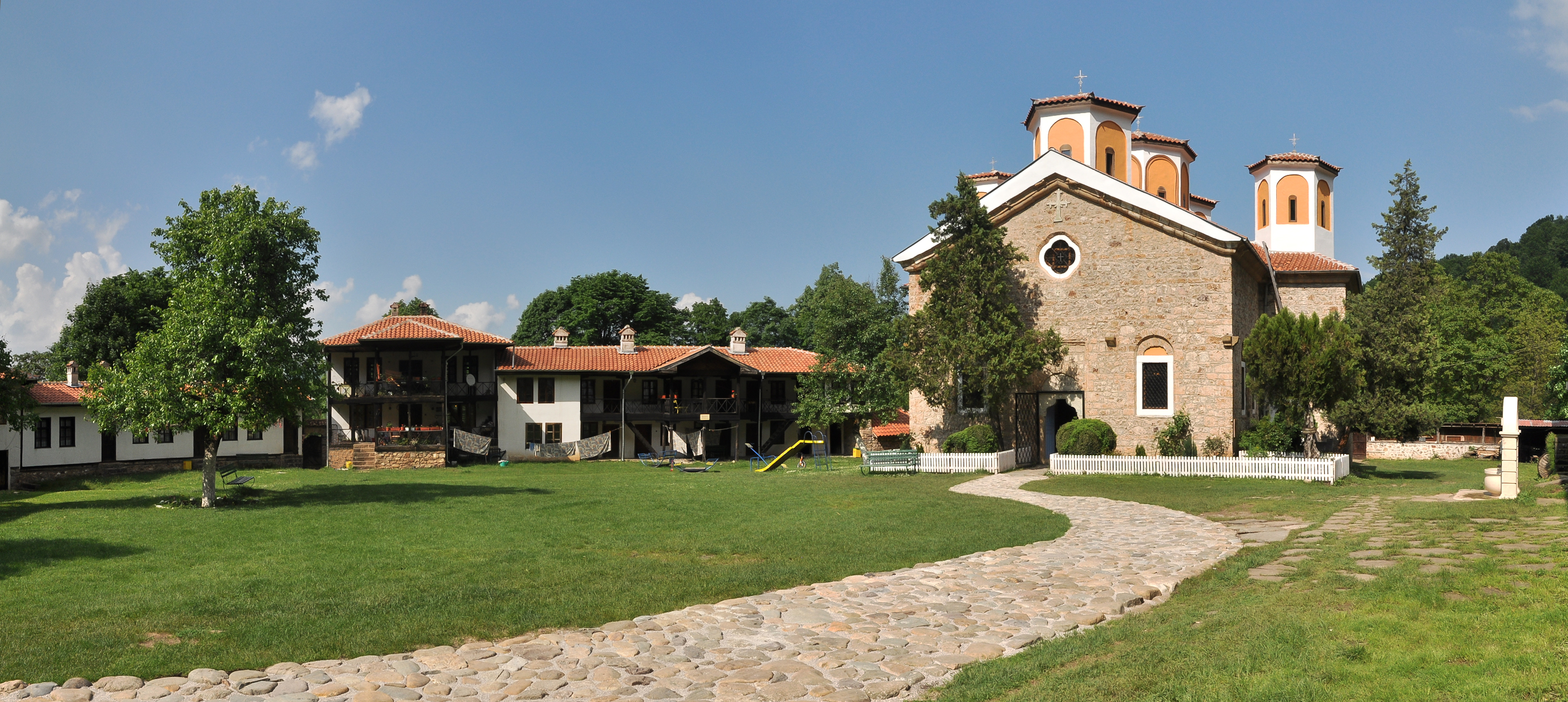
- Overview of the Etropole Monastery with the main church and the living quarters

- Location within Bulgaria

Monastery information
- Other name: Varovitets
- Order: Bulgarian Orthodox
- Denomination: Bulgarian Orthodox Church
- Established: 12th or 13th century
- Dedication: Holy Trinity
- Celebration: Pentecost
- Controlled churches: 1 main church, 2 chapels

People
- Important associated figures: Vasil Levski

Site
- Location: Near Etropole, Sofia Province, Bulgaria
- Coordinates: 42°49′25.6″N 24°2′13.9″E

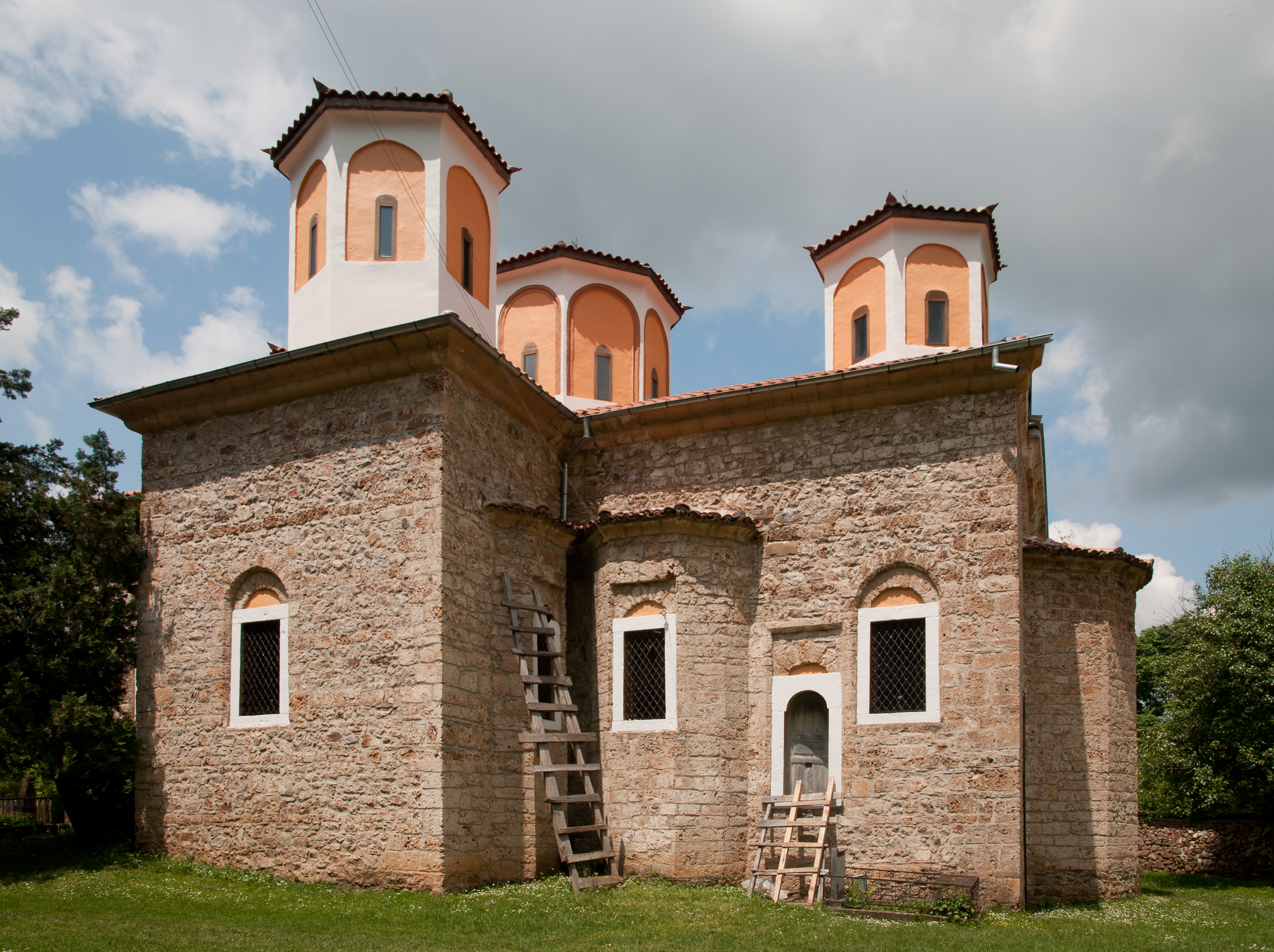
Side view of the main church of the Etropole Monastery

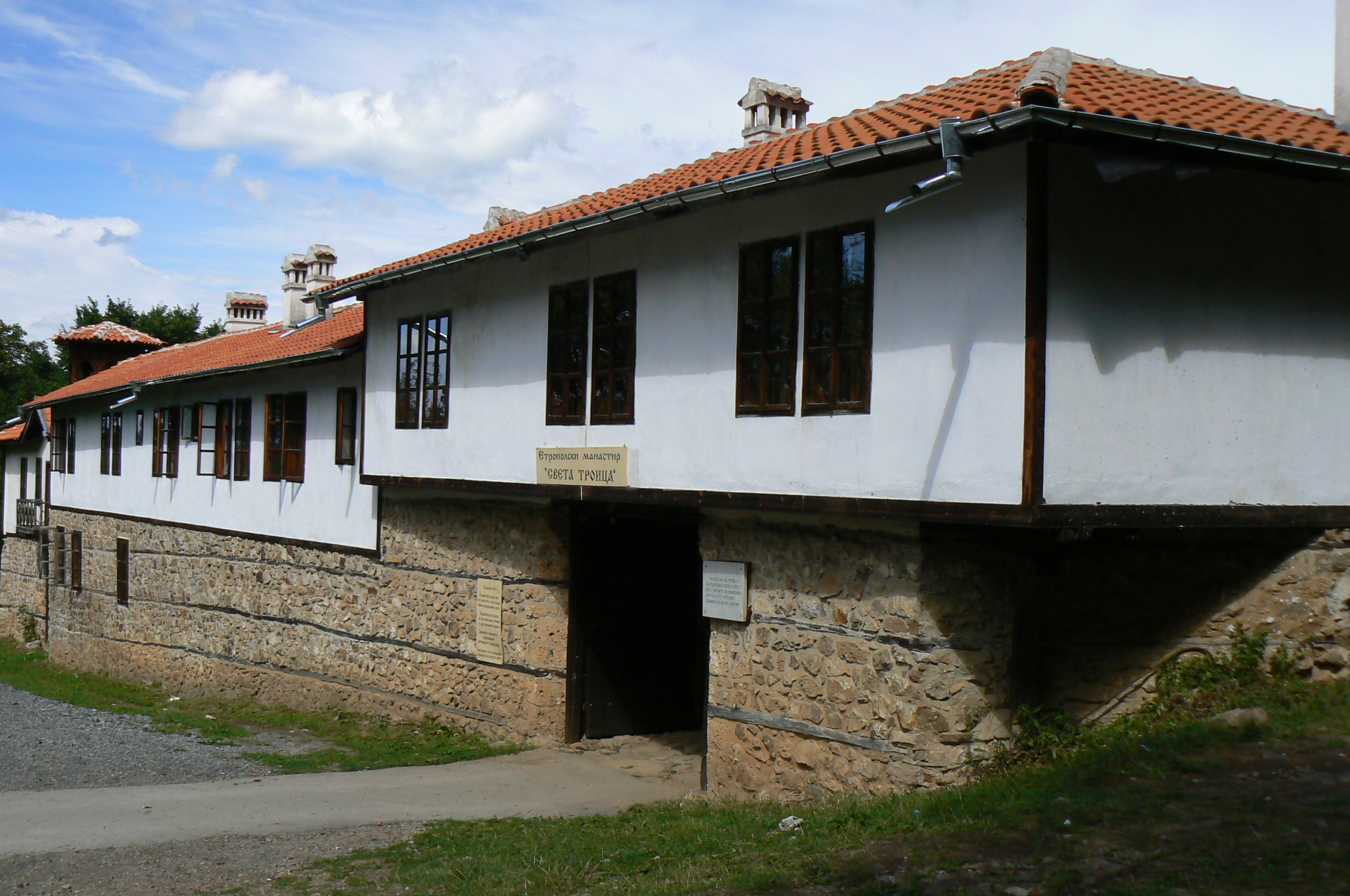
View of the residential quarters from the outside

The Etropole Monastery of the Holy Trinity (Bulgarian: Етрополски манастир „Света Троица”, Etropolski manastir „Sveta Troitsa”), also known as Varovitets (Варовитец), is a Bulgarian Orthodox monastery near the town of Etropole in west-central Bulgaria. The monastery was founded in the 12th or 13th century, its heyday being from the 16th to the 18th century when, thanks to its prolific scriptoria, it was the dominant literary centre of Ottoman-ruled northern Bulgaria. In its present form, the monastery includes a large mid-19th-century church and two chapels.

== History ==
The Etropole Monastery is located 5 kilometres (3.1 miles) from the eponymous town, which lies to the north-east of the Bulgarian capital Sofia. The closest inhabited place is the village of Ribaritsa, which is 4 kilometres (2.5 miles) west of the monastery. The monastery lies among maple woodlands at the foot of the Balkan Mountains.

The monastery was founded during the Second Bulgarian Empire, either in the 12th or 13th century. According to a stone inscription reportedly placed into the foundations of the church, the exact year of its foundation is 1158, during the Byzantine rule of Bulgaria. The medieval part of the monastery's history is documented in its commemoration codex (pomenik), which also includes lists of medieval Bulgarian and Serbian monarchs.

The Etropole Monastery reached its apogee between the 16th and 18th centuries, when it emerged as the most important literary and cultural centre of the northern Bulgarian lands under Ottoman rule, with its own scriptoria and a calligraphic school with a characteristic style. Under abbots Anthony, Zachary and Raphael, who were in charge of the monastery from the 1620s to the 1640s, the Etropole Literary School was a major centre of production for chiefly religious manuscripts. Its influence spread throughout the Balkans to other schools of the time. Particularly active scribes of this period were the priest Valcho, hieromonk Daniel, John the Grammarian and Basil of Sofia. Thanks to the successful literary efforts of its community, the monastery was able to sustain itself through the sale of manuscripts, in addition to donations from wealthy locals. 76 works of the Etropole Literary School are housed by the National Library of Bulgaria and the Museum of Church History.

In the late 19th century, during the last decades of the Ottoman rule of Bulgaria, the time of Bulgaria's struggle for independence, the monastery provided shelter to national hero Vasil Levski and other anti-Ottoman revolutionaries. Levski even had a hiding place specially built for himself at the monastery. At present the monastery is inhabited by a small number of nuns.

== Architecture and culture ==
The monastery's present main church (katholikon) is a large cruciform three-naved church that features five hexagon-shaped turret domes. The church was constructed in 1858 or 1859, though its exterior decoration was not finished until 1860 and its current set of interior frescoes were only painted from 1896 to 1907. The main material in the church's construction, limestone, may be the origin of the monastery's alternative name, Varovitets (from Bulgarian варовит varovit, "limy"). The church was designed by the architect Ivan Boyanov (Boyanin) from Bratsigovo and built to replace the old monastery church, which was destroyed because of its deteriorating condition. The same architect also designed a previous incarnation of the Saint Nedelya Church in Sofia.

In addition to the main church, the Etropole Monastery also includes two smaller chapels and various residential buildings in the Bulgarian National Revival style, which are situated in a grass-covered yard. The chapels are each dedicated to Saint John the Baptist and Saints Cosmas and Damian. One of the rooms in the residential quarters functions as a small museum to Vasil Levski, focusing on his time hiding at the monastery.

Among the valuable items in possession of the monastery are two 15th-century crosses with rich silver decoration and a gold-plated ossuary. The oldest icon from the Etropole Monastery is a rendition of the Holy Trinity of the Old Testament from 1598 painted by the teacher Nedyalko from Lovech; several 17th- and 18th-century icons previously in use at the monastery are now part of the National Art Gallery's collection.

The monastery celebrates its holiday on Pentecost, the feast of the Holy Trinity. In the woods in the vicinity of the monastery are the Varovitets Waterfall, 15 metres (49 feet) high, and its source, an eponymously named karst spring.
