= Glavanovtsi, Montana Province =

Village in Bulgaria

Coordinates: 43°19′23″N 022°57′50″E

Glavanovtsi (Bulgarian: Главановци) is a village (село) in northwestern Bulgaria, located in the Georgi Damyanovo Municipality (община Георги Дамяново) of the Montana Province (Област Монтана).
