= Bulgarian historiography =

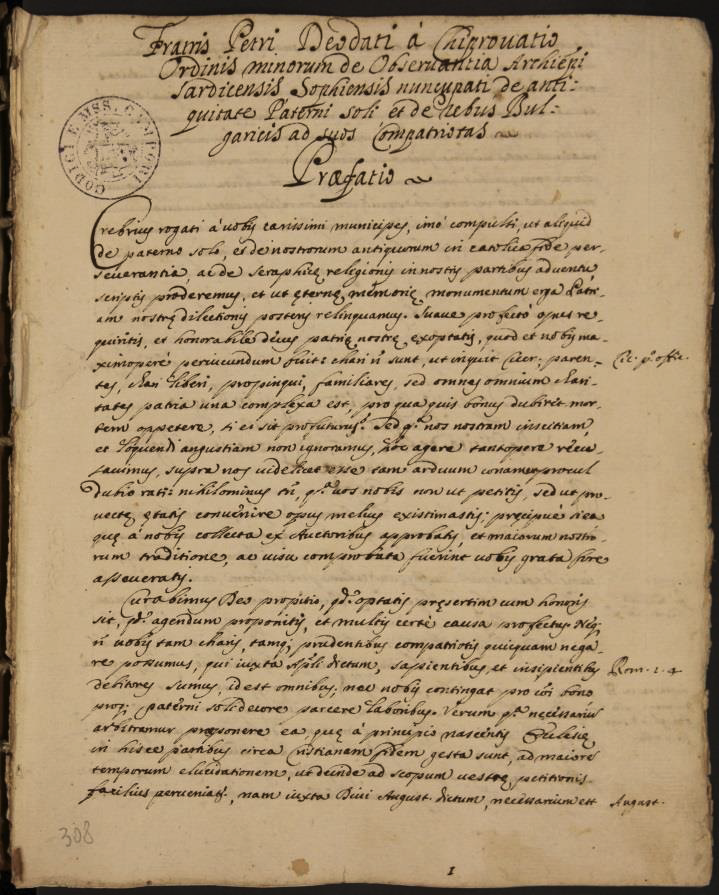
The front page of the first History of Bulgaria by Petar Bogdan from 1667.

Bulgarian historiography refers to the methodology of history studies developed and used by Bulgarian historians. Certified Bulgarian historiography dates back to the 17th century. In principle, the terms Bulgarian Historiography and Historiography of Bulgaria overlap, given that until the liberation of Bulgaria there are only two stories (the first of Bulgaria and the second of Bulgarians) written by foreign authors – Blasius Kleiner (1761) and on Konstantin Jireček (1876).

Bulgaria and the Bulgarians are widely attested in medieval chronicles and writings, but their thematic independent history is absent until the 17th century. The first major work concerning Bulgarian history is the Kingdom of the Slavs. It serves to support many other works.

From 1667 dates the first independent Bulgarian history of Petar Bogdan, which is entitled About the antiquity of the father land and the Bulgarian affairs. It is debatable whether it was printed in Venice at all, but this story remains without any social significance. The author is Bulgarian but a Catholic missionary. It was not until the next 18th century when with the Enlightenment and the rise of nationalism in Europe was composed the so-called Istoriya Slavyanobolgarskaya, which played a huge role and was of fundamental importance for Bulgarian historiography. Spyridon Gabrovski used the library of the Neamț Monastery to supplement his knowledge and in 1792 he managed to complete a "Short history of the Bulgarian Slavic people".

Professional Bulgarian historiography came to fruition in the 19th century after the creation of an independent Bulgarian state in 1878. The main credit for this is due to two authors – Spiridon Palauzov with his Century of the Bulgarian Tsar Simeon, ie. The Golden Age of medieval Bulgarian culture (1852) and Konstantin Jireček with his History of the Bulgarians (1876).

From 1878 to World War I, the main focus of historical research was medieval Bulgarian history. During this period, historiography helped shape national consciousness and pride using historical knowledge, in line with other European countries as well as other Balkan states. Positivism and romanticism was prevalent, along with politicization of the profession. Sofia University became the center of historical research. The period after World War II saw Marxist methodology being imposed, in symbiosis with nationalistic tendencies which grew after the 1960s.

== Sources ==
- Todorova, Maria (1992). "Historiography of the Countries of Eastern Europe: Bulgaria". The American Historical Review. 97 (4). doi:10.2307/2165495. JSTOR 2165495.
