= Constantine Manasses =

Byzantine chronicler and poet (c. 1125 – c. 1187)

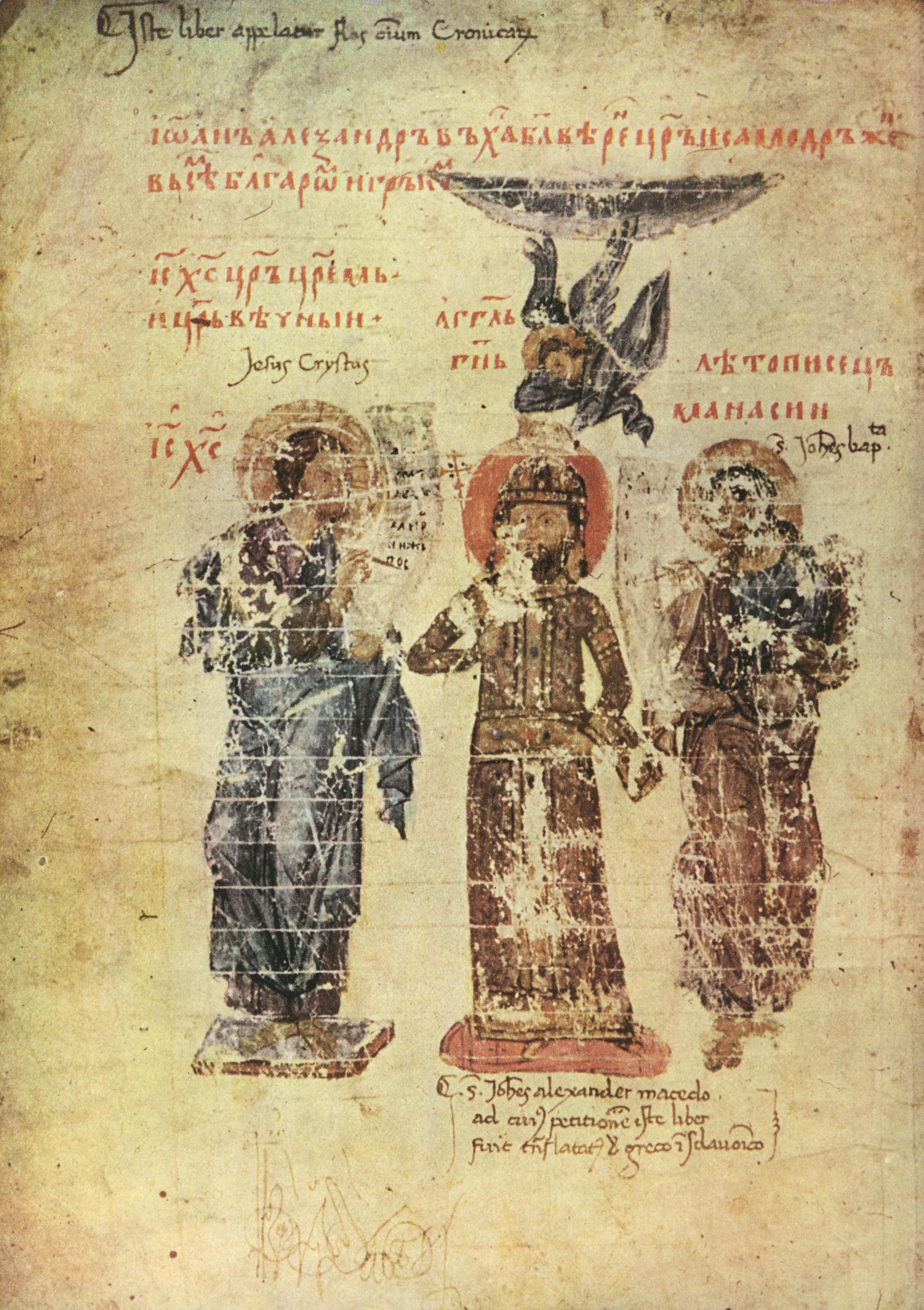
Constantine Manasses (right) next to Bulgarian tsar Ivan Alexander (middle) and Jesus Christ (left). Miniature from the Vatican copy of the Middle Bulgarian translation of Synopsis Chronike, 14th century.

Constantine Manasses (Greek: Κωνσταντῖνος Μανασσῆς; c. 1125 (Note: Older sources estimate his year of birth to be around 1130. Finding it unlikely that Manasses was just 20 years old when writing the Synopsis Chronike, Warren Treadgold pushes the estimation slightly earlier to c. 1125. Other modern sources suggest 1120 or even 1115.) – c. 1187) was a Byzantine chronicler and poet who was active during the reign of Manuel I Komnenos (1143–1180). His main work was Synopsis Chronike, a poetic overview of world history. In his final years, Constantine may have been appointed as the metropolitan of Naupactos, although some modern scholars reject the idea.

== Synopsis Chronike ==
Sýnopsis Chronikê (Σύνοψις Χρονική, translated as 'Chronological Synopsis', or 'Historical Summary'), though a historiographic work, is formally speaking a lengthy narrative poem, consisting of about 6,620 lines in political verse. In addition to Biblical narratives, starting with the creation of the world, Near Eastern, and Roman history, the text pays particular attention to the Trojan War and Byzantine history, ending with the reign of Nikephoros III Botaneiates (1081). The work was commissioned by Irene, the widow of Andronikos Komnenos and Emperor Manuel's sister-in-law. It is estimated that the work was finished around 1150, shortly before Irene's death in 1153. Judging by its nearly hundred surviving manuscripts, the poem was widely read. In the 13th century, a prose retelling in the vernacular register was also produced, surviving in 24 manuscripts.

In the 14th century, the Synopsis was translated into Middle Bulgarian (Bulgarian Church Slavonic) prose. This translation was commissioned by Bulgarian tsar Ivan Alexander between 1340 and 1345. In comparison with the original, the translation contains modifications and additions mainly focusing on Bulgarian history, and their ultimate goal has been interpreted as promotion of the idea of Veliko Tarnovo (Bulgarian Empire) as the Third Rome, i.e. the successor of Constantinople by the principle of translatio imperii. The text exerted influence on later Russian chronicles, and was one of the inspirations for the notion of Moscow as the Third Rome.

An Arabic translation written in 1313 is now hosted at the British Library.

== Other works ==
Manasses also wrote the poetical romance Loves of Aristander and Callithea, also in political verse. It is only known from the fragments preserved in the rose-garden of Macarius Chrysocephalus (14th century). Manasses also wrote a short biography of Oppian, and some descriptive pieces, all except one unpublished, on artistic and other subjects. (Note: For further information on Aristander and Callithea, see Hunger (1978:126–128).)

== Manuscripts and editions ==
The Greek text of the Synopsis survives in almost a hundred manuscripts. The critical editions are:

- Bekkerus, Immanuel, ed. (1837). "Constantini Manassis breviarium historiae metricum". Corpus scriptorum historiae Byzantinae: Constantinus Manasses, Ioel, Georgius Acropolita. Bonnae. pp. 1–287. (Greek text with Latin translation)
- Lampsidis, Odysseus, ed. (1996). Constantini Manassis breviarium chronicum. Athenis: Institutum graecoromanae antiquitatis auctoribus edendis destinatum academiae Atheniensis. ISBN 9607099397. (2 vols.)

The Slavonic text survives in five complete manuscripts – three in Middle Bulgarian from 14th century, and two later ones:

- Synodal or Moscow copy (Синодальный список), held at State Historical Museum in Moscow
- Codex Vaticanus slavicus 2, held at Vatican Library; slightly younger than the Synodal copy and illustrated with 69 miniatures – scan on DigiVatLib
- Tulcea copy, held at the library of Romanian Academy of Sciences, Bucharest
- Hilandar copy, held at Hilandar Monastery; in Serbian Church Slavonic, 16th century
- Sofia copy, held at National Library of Russia, 17th century

The Middle Bulgarian version has been published in:

- Bogdan, Ioan, ed. (1922). Cronica lui Constantin Manasses: Traducere mediobulgară făcută pe la 1350. Bucureşti: Socec & Co.
- Dujčev, Ivan (1965). Die Miniaturen der Manasses-Chronik. Sofia: Bulgarski hudosnik. (reproductions of miniatures from the Cod. Vat. slav. 2)
- Дуйчев, И.С.; Лихачев, Д.С., eds. (1988). Среднеболгарский перевод хроники Константина Манассии в славянских литературах. София: Издательство Болгарской академии наук.

Modern translations are:

- The Chronicle of Constantine Manasses. Translated by Yuretich, Linda. Liverpool: Liverpool University Press. 2018. ISBN 9781786941510. (based on Greek and Slavonic versions)
- Konstantinos Manasses: Verschronik. Translated by Paul, Anneliese; Rhoby, Andreas. Stuttgart: Anton Hiersemann. 2019.

Texts and translations of the Loves of Aristander and Callithea were published in:

- Mazal, Otto (1967). Der Roman des Konstantinos Manasses: Überlieferung, Rekonstruktion, Textausgabe der Fragmente. Wien: Österreichische Akademie der Wissenschaften.
- Four Byzantine Novels. Translated by Jeffreys, Elizabeth. Liverpool: Liverpool University Press. 2012. ISBN 978-1-84631-825-2.

== Sources ==
- Hunger, Herbert (1978). Die hochsprachliche profane Literatur der Byzantiner: Zweiter Band. München: C.H. Beck.
- Kaimakamova, Miliana (2006). "Turnovo – New Constantinopole: The Third Rome in the Fourteenth-Century Bulgarian Translation of Constantine Manasses' Synopsis Chronike". In Kooper, Erik (ed.). The Medieval Chronicle IV. Amsterdam - New York: Rodopi. pp. 91–104. ISBN 978-90-420-2088-7.
- Nilsson, Ingela (2021). "The Literary Voice of a Chronicler: The Synopsis Chronike of Constantine Manasses". Scandinavian Journal of Byzantine and Modern Greek Studies. 7: 9–40.
- Treadgold, Warren (2013). The Middle Byzantine Historians. Palgrave Macmillan. pp. 399–403. ISBN 9781137280855.
- Yuretich, Linda (2018). "Introduction". The Chronicle of Constantine Manasses. Translated by Yuretich, Linda. Liverpool: Liverpool University Press. p. 1–17. ISBN 9781786941510.
