= Istoriya vo krattse o bolgarskom narode slovenskom =

Work by Spiridon of Gabrovo

Istoriya vo krattse o bolgarskom narode slovenskom (Original Cyrillic: Исторiя во кратцѣ о болгарскомъ народѣ славенскомъ; Bulgarian: История во кратце о болгарском народе словенском, romanized: Istoriya vo krattse o bolgarskom narode slovenskom, lit. 'A brief history of the Bulgarian Slavic people') (Note: Also rendered in English as Short History of the Bulgarian Slavic People, A Short History of the Slavic Bulgarian People, and A Short History of the Bulgarian Slavonic People.) completed in 1792, is a work of early Bulgarian National Revival literature written by the Hieromonk Spiridon of Gabrovo. Written 30 years after Paisius of Hilendar's famous Istoriya Slavyanobolgarskaya (1762), Spiridon's work represents the second major attempt to reconstruct a comprehensive and patriotic narrative of Bulgarian history to awaken national consciousness under Ottoman rule. Hieromonk Spiridon took advantage of the massive library at the Neamț Monastery in Moldavia to compile a vast chronicle. The book was inspired by the work by Joannes Zonaras, Caesar Baronius and Paisius. The foreword of the book covers Spiridon's intention "to restore from oblivion the Bulgarian people and the Old Kingdom and patriarchate, and to find the roots of its origin and the tribe from which it came". However, per historian Roumen Daskalov, it lacks Paisius's pathos. Like Paisius, he regarded the Bulgarians as descendants of Meshech. Spiridon heavily utilized Illyrism, an ideological framework that classified the ancient Illyrians of the Western Balkans as early Slavs. He claimed ancient Balkan antiquity as an inherent part of Slavic and Bulgarian heritage. To amplify the prestige of the Bulgarians, he depicted Alexander the Great in an overwhelmingly positive light. In Spiridon’s narrative, after Alexander defeated an "Illyrian" king named Perun, he respected the Illyrians so much that he incorporated them into his elite army and granted Perun's sons rule over Macedonia. The book details an expansive and semi-mythological list of early rulers to show how "Greater Bulgaria" successfully went to war against both the Western Roman Empire and the Eastern Roman Empire. Despite its immense factual detail, Spiridon's history did not achieve the influence of Paisius's work. It remained a hidden manuscript for over a century, copied only in limited monastic circles. Only one manuscript copy of the book is known to exist, dating from 1819 and made by Petko Pop Manov from Gabrovo. The work first came to the attention of the scholarly community in 1869, when Slavist Alexander Hilferding presented the work to the Slavic Society in Saint Petersburg. Hilferding likely found the book at the Rila Monastery. It was finally recovered and published in print for the wider public in 1900 by the Bulgarian Literary Society. Per historian Mercia MacDermott: "Spiridon's History is a little more animated than the Zograf, but although he does point with pride to the fact that Bulgaria was the oldest Slavonic kingdom and the first to accept Christianity, his History lacks the burning, militant patriotism of Paisi."

== See also ==
- De antiquitate Paterni soli et de rebus Bulgaricis
