= Bozhidar Dimitrov =

Bulgarian historian and politician (1945–2018)

- Божидар Димитров
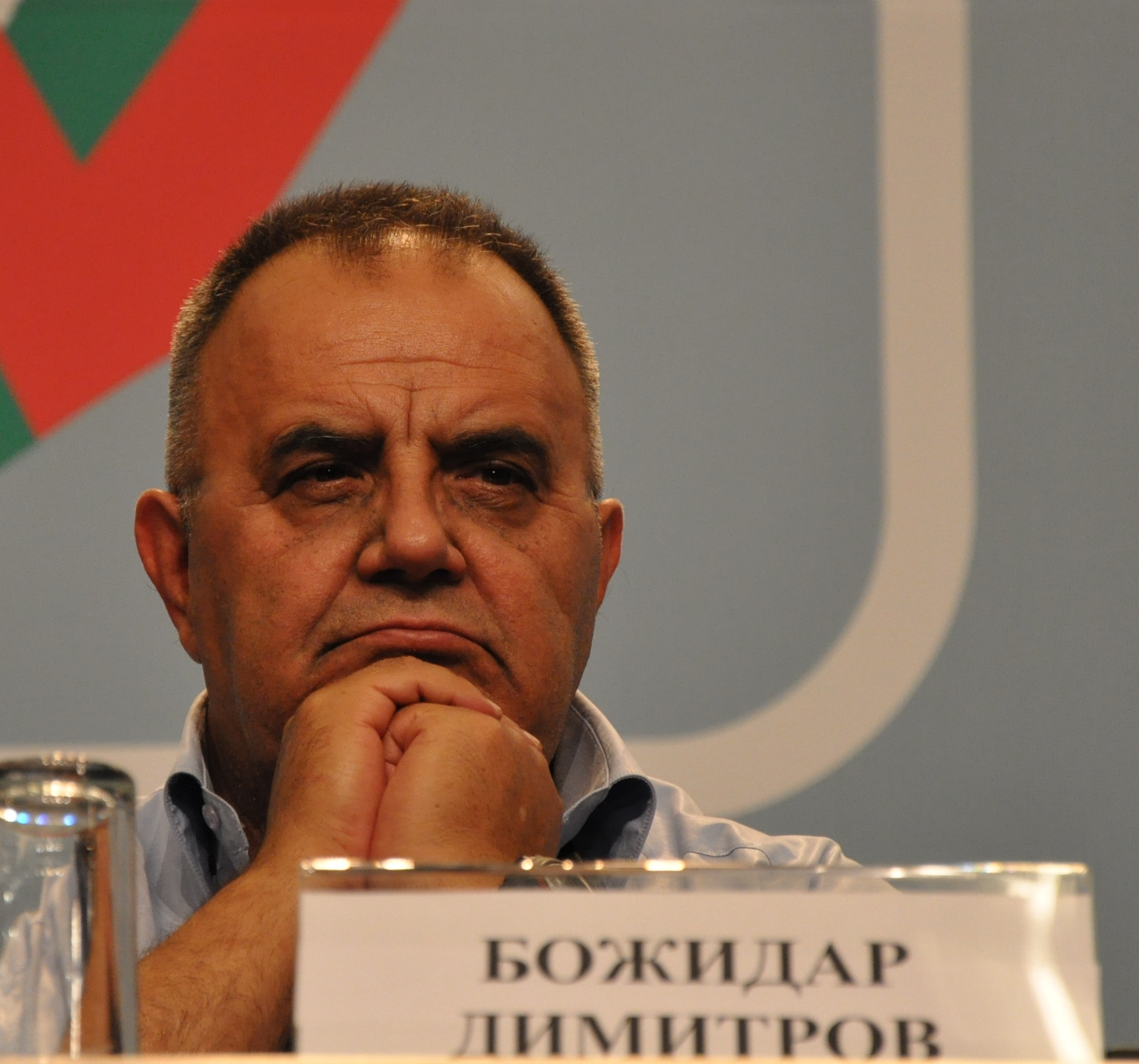
- Dimitrov in 2009
- Born: 3 December 1945; Sozopol, Bulgaria
- Died: 1 July 2018 (aged 72); Sofia, Bulgaria
- Education: Sofia University
- Occupations: Historian; politician
- Political party: BSP, GERB

Bozhidar Dimitrov Stoyanov (Bulgarian: Божидар Димитров Стоянов, 3 December 1945 – 1 July 2018) was a Bulgarian nationalist historian and politician, in the sphere of Medieval Bulgarian history, the Ottoman rule of Bulgaria and the Macedonian Question. He was the director of the National Historical Museum. Formerly a Bulgarian Socialist Party (BSP) member, he later became affiliated with the Citizens for European Development of Bulgaria (GERB) political party.

== Biography ==
Bozhidar Dimitrov Stoyanov was born on 3 December 1945 in Sozopol into a Bulgarian refugee family from Eastern Thrace. He specialised in paleography in Paris, France. Dimitrov received a PhD in history from Sofia University, where he studied history and archaeology. As an agent of the State Security since the 1970s, he managed to secure materials about Bulgaria in the Vatican Secret Archives, such as Petar Bogdan's 1667 historical work about Bulgaria. Dimitrov was a Bulgarian historian in the fields of Medieval Bulgarian history, the Ottoman rule in Bulgaria, and the Macedonian Question. Until the fall of communism, he was a specialist in medieval studies, but he switched to national issues. He also ended up switching from academic to popular history.

He was the director of the National Historical Museum. As the director, he had a conflict with Bulgarian president Petar Stoyanov regarding whether to return the Istoriya Slavyanobolgarskaya's rough copy to the Zograf Monastery in Mount Athos, Greece, or preserve it in Bulgaria. He was the initiator of the local media scandal about the Batak massacre in 2007 in response to Martina Baleva's project, which resulted in death threats and online harassment against academics Ulf Brunnbauer and Martina Baleva. According to Bulgarian historian Aleksandar Vezenkov, despite being regarded as a manipulator and a "Chalga historian" by his colleagues, his interpretations were taken seriously by many specialists. As a member of the Supreme Party Council of Bulgarian Socialist Party (BSP), he declared himself openly against the party in 2005 by not supporting BSP's Mayor of Sofia candidate Tatyana Doncheva and instead favouring the independent Boyko Borisov. Because of this, he was taken down from the post of BSP's municipal councillors' leader in Sofia. Before the 2009 Bulgarian parliamentary election, Dimitrov left BSP and joined Borisov's GERB. He was the party's candidate for 2nd MMC – Burgas in the first-past-the-post vote and won the election with 35.92%. He finished ahead of Volen Siderov, the leader of the nationalist Attaka. In June 2009, Dimitrov's service in the State Security was revealed in Bulgaria.

He was minister without portfolio responsible for Bulgarians abroad in GERB's government from July 2009 to February 2011. In 2010, he caused a diplomatic controversy with Turkey when he said that Bulgaria should block Turkey's accession process into the European Union, unless it gave Bulgaria 15 billion euros as compensation for Bulgarians who were expelled from Eastern Thrace during the Second Balkan War. Dimitrov had resigned from the position due to his service in the communist period as Borisov's government promised to dismiss all Bulgarian diplomats who worked for communist secret services. In August 2015, he was photographed splashing "holy water" from the well in Pliska's Basilica on Borisov, but the water was unsafe for human consumption. An online petition calling for his retirement as director of National Historical Museum was launched by cultural anthropologist Ivailo Dichev, who said that "Dimitrov offended the scientific community with his unproven assertions and fables, insulted national feelings with his mercenary attitude towards heritage", etc. In December 2015, the Bulgarian Ministry of Culture awarded him with the cultural award "Golden Age". An honorary diploma was also awarded to him for his contribution to Bulgarian culture. After retiring from the National Historical Museum in 2017, he caused a controversy by insulting Russian government spokesperson Maria Zakharova after she downplayed Bulgaria's role in saving Bulgarian Jews during World War II by claiming it was Russia that had saved them. In March 2018, he founded a national movement named "Khan Kubrat" in honour of the ruler of Old Great Bulgaria and suggested a presidential republic with a strong leader. The anti-corruption commission established that when he was the director of the National Historical Museum, Dimitrov was in conflicts of interest for having signed two contracts with his daughter and nephews in 2015. He died on 1 July 2018 at the age of 72 from pulmonary embolism. Dimitrov Cove in Antarctica is named after him.

== Views and works ==
Dimitrov was a prolific writer of popular historical works, as well as the host of popular historical television shows, such as Bulgarian Memory, which aired on Channel 1 from 2002 to 2012. He authored 30 treatises and over 250 articles and papers, as well as several books (including The Ten Lies of Macedonism and Twelve Myths in Bulgarian History). Many of his books achieved second and third editions. He was known for his nationalist views.

Dimitrov often emphasised Bulgarian contributions to Slavic civilisation. In his 1993 book Bulgarians: Civilizers of the Slavic World, Dimitrov asserted: "Few, however, know that the Bulgarians are the ones who created the foundation for European medieval Christian civilization (the base upon which contemporary Europe is built, too)." In his narrative, Slavs were not capable of establishing states and relied on the Bulgars. Dimitrov claimed that Serbia, Croatia, Romania, and Russia, have to thank the Bulgarians for their language and Christian culture. In his 2005 book 12 Myths in Bulgarian History, he promoted the thesis of Bulgarians' "genetic predisposition to state-building." English and French translations of the book were sponsored by the Bulgarian government.

In his popular historical book Bulgarians – The First Europeans, he claimed that the Thracians appeared in 5th century BCE in the modern Bulgarian lands and the ancestors of the Bulgarians were the first Europeans. Per Dimitrov, Bulgarians were also the first to develop and implement the concept of nation-state. According to Bulgarian academics Maya Kosseva, Antonina Zhelyazkova and Marko Hajdinjak, most of Dimitrov's claims selectively, manipulatively and inconsistently interpreted history and could be easily challenged. Per academics Barbara Segaert and Raymond Detrez, he was highly controversial among professional scholars.

In his book The Ten Lies of Macedonism, he claimed that the Macedonians are actually Bulgarians, the Macedonian nation does not exist and the Macedonian language is a dialect of the Bulgarian language. Per Bulgarian historian Chris Kostov, as a scholar of the old school, Dimitrov believed that the nation is an organic and static entity, unable to change and evolve. Dimitrov said that he would award a €100,000 prize to a person who showed him a primary source confirming that Samuel of Bulgaria or Dimitar Miladinov and other historical figures declared themselves as Macedonians instead of Bulgarians, which was criticised by Kostov as an attempt to turn Balkan history into a reality show.

In 2014, Dimitrov claimed that Macedonism should be charged as a crime against humanity by the European Court of Human Rights and International Criminal Court. After Russia annexed Crimea in 2014, in 2015 he stated:

In 1954, a drunkard gave away the Crimea, Russian territory, along with its Russian population, to a fictional country, to a "Macedonia". Russian Macedonia – that is Ukraine. Fictional border – such as the borders of Macedonia. When the political elite creates such fictional countries and false nations that never existed, it is appropriate it to be repaired at some point.

During the European migrant crisis, he suggested the conversion of migrants to Christianity and acceptance of women and children only.

== Publications ==
- Bozhidar Dimitrov. The True History of Liberation 1860–1878. Sofia: Standart News Ltd., 2010. 183 pp. ISBN 978-954-92377-9-5 (First edition in 2006, ISBN 978-954-91652-5-8.) (in Bulgarian)
- Bozhidar Dimitrov, co-author. Bulgarian Policies on the Republic of Macedonia: Recommendations on the development of good neighbourly relations following Bulgaria’s accession to the EU and in the context of NATO and EU enlargement in the Western Balkans. Sofia: Manfred Wörner Foundation, 2008. 80 pp. ISBN 978-954-92032-2-6 (Trilingual publication in Bulgarian, Macedonian and English)
- Bozhidar Dimitrov. The Ten Lies of Macedonism. Sofia: Kom Foundation, 2007. 107 pp. ISBN 978-954-91652-9-6 (First edition in 2000 in Bulgarian, ISBN 978-954-90700-1-9.)
- Bozhidar Dimitrov. Macedonia – Holy Bulgarian Land: Who Are the Successors of Alexander the Great and Roxana? Sofia: Kom Foundation, 2007. 80 pp. ISBN 978-954-8745-06-2 (in Bulgarian)
- Bozhidar Dimitrov. Seven Ancient Civilizations in Bulgaria: With Maps & Color Illustrations. Sofia: Kom Foundation, 2006. 112 pp. ISBN 978-954-9464-07-8
- Bozhidar Dimitrov. 12 Myths in Bulgarian History. Sofia, Kom Foundation, 2005. 148 pp. ISBN 978-954-91652-1-0 (in Bulgarian)
- Bozhidar Dimitrov. Bulgarians: The First Europeans. Sofia: St. Kliment Ohridsky University Press, 2002. 108 pp. ISBN 978-954-07-1758-6
- Bozhidar Dimitrov. Bulgaria and the Vatican. Sofia: Bulgarian Diplomatic Review, 2002. 56 pp. ISBN 978-954-91062-4-4
- Bozhidar Dimitrov. The Bulgars and Alexander of Macedon. Sofia: Tangra Publishers, 2001. 138 pp. ISBN 954-9942-29-5 (in Bulgarian)
- Bozhidar Dimitrov. Venetian Documents on Bulgarian History During the 16th and 17th Century. Sofia: Borina Ltd., 1994. ISBN 978-954-500-036-2 (in Bulgarian)
