= Petar Bogdan =

Roman Catholic bishop (1601–1674)

- Петър Богдан
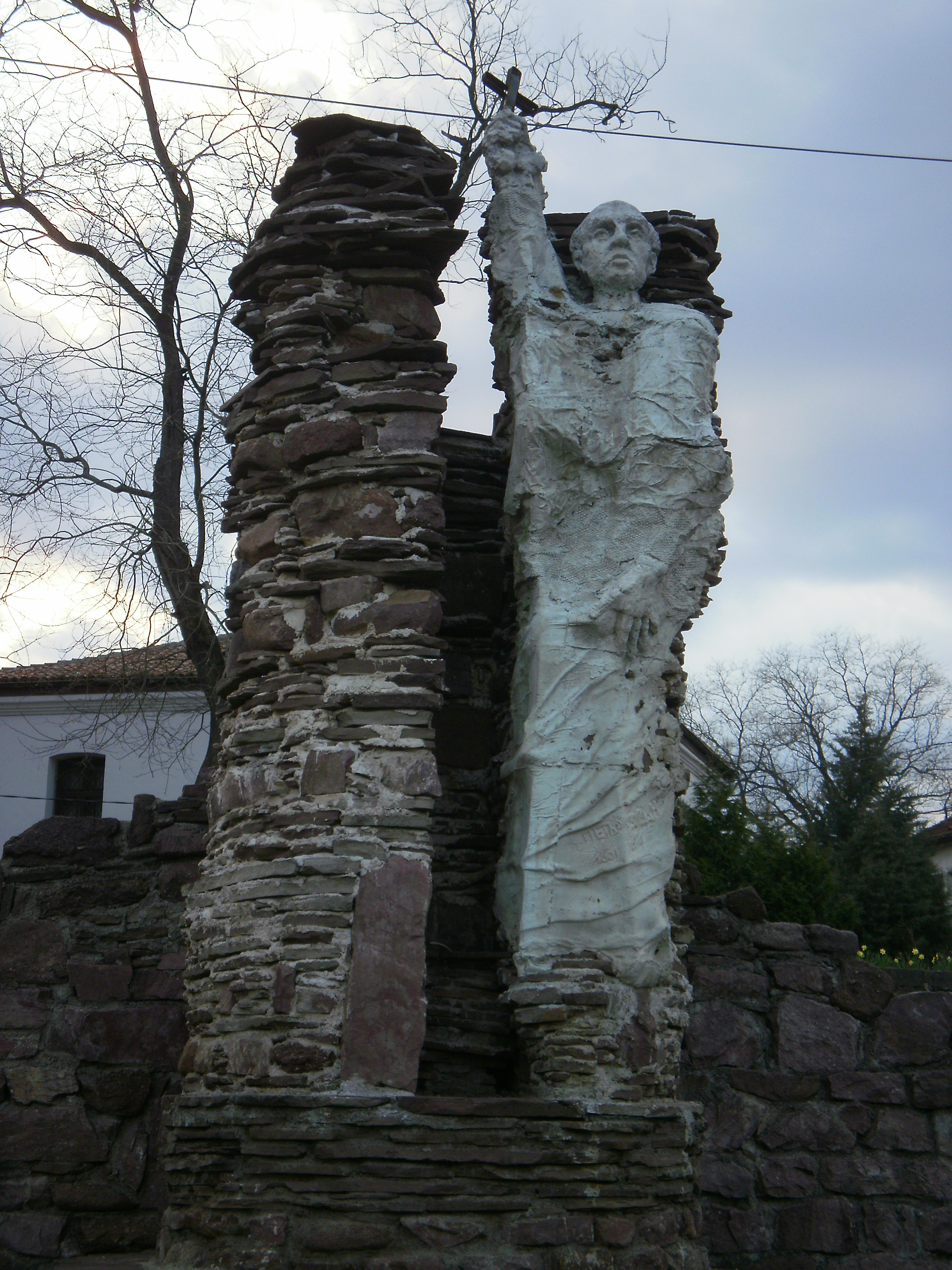

Personal life
- Born: 1601 Chiprovtsi, Ottoman Empire
- Died: 1674 (aged 72–73) Chiprovtsi, Ottoman Empire
- Notable work: De antiquitate Paterni soli et de rebus Bulgaricis
- Education: Collegio Clementino
- Occupation: Cleric

Religious life
- Religion: Christianity
- Denomination: Catholicism
- Order: Order of Friars Minor
- Monastic name: Petar

Senior posting
- Post: Archbishop of Sofia
- Previous post: Bishop of Sofia

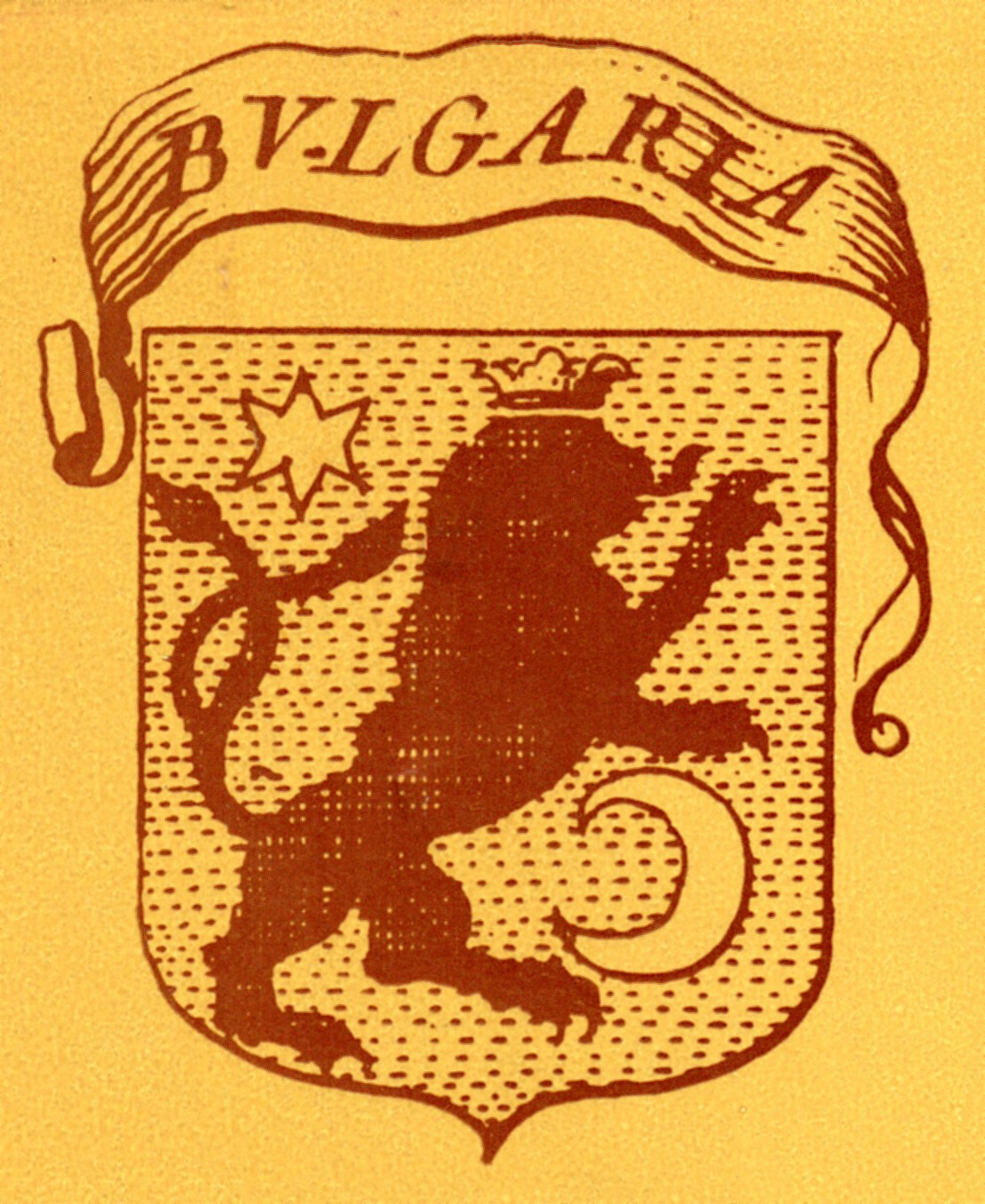
Coat of Arms of Bulgaria by Petar Bogdan Bakshev, 17th century

Petar Bogdan Bakshich (Bulgarian: Петър Богдан Бакшич; (Note: Also rendered as Bakšić and Bakshev (Bulgarian: Бакшев).) 1601–1674), also known as Petrus Deodatus, was a Bulgarian Catholic cleric who authored De antiquitate Paterni soli et de rebus Bulgaricis (On the antiquity of the fatherland and the deeds of the Bulgarians)—the oldest preserved modern written work of the Bulgarian historiography, dated to 1667. Bogdan had served as the first Catholic Archbishop of Sofia.

== Biography ==
Petar Bogdan was born in 1601 in Chiprovtsi, at the time in the Ottoman Empire (modern Bulgaria). His birth name was Bogdan, while Petar was the religious name he took upon becoming a member of the Order of Friars Minor, possibly at his own request, to honor his first teacher and benefactor, Catholic bishop Petar Solinat. He also adopted the name "Bakshich", which was formed on the model of Croatian patronymic surnames.

In 1612, he became a novice at the Franciscan monastery in Chiprovtsi, where he got noticed by Solinat. He became a monk in 1618 and studied at the Catholic school in the Monastery of Saint Francis in Ancona. In 1622, he was ordained as a priest and appointed as a vicar to Solinat. From the same year, he continued his education at the Collegio Clementino in Rome, where he studied theology and completed his studies in 1626. During his studies, he became familiar with humanism, which inspired him to advocate for Bulgarian independence from the Ottoman Empire. In 1627, he went to the Illyrian College of Loreto, and in early 1629, he went to Rome, where he helped Rafael Levaković in the editing of the Glagolitic edition of the Roman Missal. In 1631, Bogdan became the guardian of the Bulgarian Franciscan custody. In 1637, he became an assistant to Marinov, and in the next year, he was appointed as the titular bishop of Gallipoli. On 17 July 1641, he succeeded Marinov as bishop of Sofia, while also becoming apostolic vicar of Wallachia and Moldavia. In the same year, Bogdan warned local clergy in Chiprovtsi during a diocesan synod not to re-baptize Orthodox people but to accept them as Catholic by profession of faith. He had a significant effort in converting Paulicians to Catholicism. In 1642, the Bishopric of Sofia became an Archbishopric under him, and he became the first Catholic Archbishop of Sofia. In 1643, he published a collection of narratives about the life of Mary, titled Heavenly Virtue, which was translated into a common South Slavic language, called "Illyrian" and in the Latin script.

In 1649, Bogdan stopped the Catholics from starting a rebellion against the Ottoman authorities due to his fear of defeat. In 1655, he met with the Serbian Patriarch Gavrilo, winning him over to the idea of organizing a general uprising of Christians in the Balkans against the Ottomans. Bogdan also met with the representative of the Greek Orthodox Church and the Metropolitan of Sofia, Meletios, apparently with the same idea in mind. That same year, due to being denounced by Meletios, he was arrested twice by the Ottoman authorities, acting on the orders of the Pasha of Sofia. Bogdan was charged with high treason, but he managed to secure his release with bribes. In 1673, he made an appeal to the Republic of Venice for assistance against "cruel slavery" under the Ottomans. He died in 1674 in Chiprovtsi.

== Works and legacy ==
In 1667, Bogdan finished his major work De antiquitate Paterni soli et de rebus Bulgaricis (On the antiquity of the fatherland and the deeds of the Bulgarians), the oldest history of Bulgaria. It is written in Latin and has 200 pages, with content about the Christian past and present of the Bulgarian lands, to gain European support for the liberation of Bulgarian lands from Ottoman rule. The book was only known in limited Catholic circles. His patriotism was strongly linked to his Catholicism, and he ignored the predominantly Orthodox traditions of the Bulgarian medieval history. In his works, including the Description of the Kingdom of Bulgaria (1640, in Italian), History of Sofia (1653) and History of Ohrid (1655), he focused mostly on the Catholic mission among the Bulgarians. He also made two other historical works, including When and how the Moravians embraced the Faith of Christ, about the Moravian mission of Cyril and Methodius, and History of Serbia and the Archbishopric of Prizren. Bogdan relied on Caesar Baronius, Mavro Orbini and others. His works were only popular among a limited circle of educated Catholic men and they had no impact on the Bulgarian Revival in the 18th century.

Bogdan knew many languages, including Latin, Italian, Greek, Croatian, Serbian, Russian, Vlach, and Turkish. He identified his language as Slavic and defined Bulgarian as a dialect of the "Illyrian language". In the book Description of the Kingdom of Bulgaria, he described the Bulgarian ethnographic borders. He wrote:

"Today, the name Bulgaria is applied to all that land which was once called Upper Moesia, as well part of Lower Moesia, the whole of Thrace—with the exception of the Gallipoli coastal region, where the Greek language is spoken—the greater part of Macedonia, the entire Morava region, extending as far as Ohrid to the borders of Albania and Greece, and stretching from Serbia in the west to the Black Sea in the east; the Danube separates it to the north from Wallachia and Moldavia..."

The book was published by Euzebije Fermendžin in 1887 and by Ivan Duichev in 1939.

Initially, the original manuscript of his 1667 book and a copy of it were undiscovered. Parts of the book were discovered in the Vatican Library by Bozhidar Dimitrov in 1977; it included the introduction, the full text of the first three chapters and part of the fourth chapter. A full copy of the book was discovered by the Bulgarian professor of comparative linguistics Liliya Ilieva at the Biblioteca Estense of Modena University at the end of 2017. The book was translated into Bulgarian by professor of classical languages Tsvetan Vasilev.

Bakshev Ridge in Antarctica is named after him.

== See also ==
- Chiprovtsi uprising
- Catholic Church in Bulgaria
- Blasius Kleiner
- Paisius of Hilendar
