= Plamen Tzvetkov =

Bulgarian university teacher

Plamen S. Tzvetkov
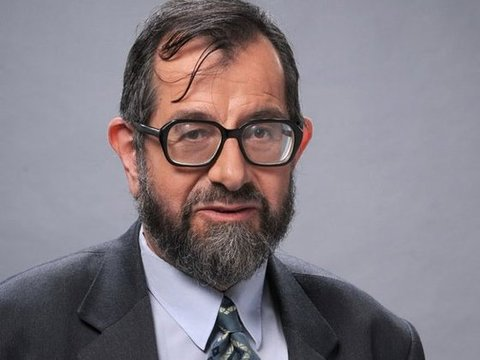
- Plamen S. Tzvetkov
- Born: Plamen Simeonov Tzvetkov; 8 August 1951; Berlin, East Germany
- Died: 3 November 2015 (aged 64); Sofia, Bulgaria
- Citizenship: Bulgarian
- Education: Sofia University "St. Kliment of Ohrid", Moscow State University
- Occupations: Historian, University Professor
- Spouse: Raia Zaimova
- Children: 3
- Writing career
- Notable works: Under the Shadow of Stalin and Hitler (2014-2016)
- Website: proftzvetkov.nbu.bg

Signature
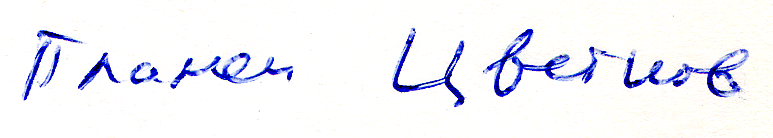

Plamen Tzvetkov was born on 8 August 1951 in Berlin (Germany) into a family of Bulgarian diplomats. He graduated with history major from the Sofia University “St. Kliment Ohridski” in 1976. In 1980 he defended his Ph.D. dissertation in Moscow State University on the topic: "Soviet policy of collective security and the Balkan countries during 1933-1935". In 1990 he published his habilitation work on "The European Powers, the Balkans and Collective Security (1933-1935)." From 1994 he began his lecturing work at the New Bulgarian University. In 1999 he defended the so-called higher doctoral thesis (Habilitationsschift) for the award of the degree "Doctor of Historical Sciences" on the theme "Small countries in the European policy during the time period of 1933-1939." Until 2000 he worked at the Institute for History at the Bulgarian Academy of Sciences, and from February 2002 he was named Professor of Modern and Contemporary History at New Bulgarian University where he taught until his death in November 2015. In 2007 Prof. Tzvetkov was given the NBU award for Best Professor of the Year.

His research interests spanned from the political and diplomatic history of Bulgaria, the Balkans, Europe and the world in the 20th century to the early history of Bulgarians and especially the problem of descent of the Bulgarian ethnicity within Bulgarian historiography.

Prof. Plamen Tzvetkov had published more than 20 monographs, 80 scientific papers and articles and more than 350 journalistic publications. It should be particularly noted his two-volume work on Balkan history from Bulgarian perspective, published in Lewiston, N.Y., Edwin Mellen Press, 1993; two-volume history called "Europe in the 20th Century" published in 2002-2003 and a book on "The World of Megamyths: Some Political and Historiographical Myths of the 20th century" in 2008 (New Bulgarian University Press). He authored also a series of books on the medium-sized and small countries in the European policy on the eve of World War II as well as a monograph titled "Are the Bulgarians Slavs?" He has given lectures and papers in various universities and research centers in Austria, Bulgaria, England, Greece, Hungary, Italy, The Netherlands, Poland, Romania, Russia, Turkey, and the USA.

Tzvetkov was member of Union of Scientists in Bulgaria (since 1991), the American Historical Society (since 1991), of the Academy of Political Science, New York (since 2007).

He was married, father of three children - a daughter and two sons. Member of the leadership of the Bulgarian branch of the American Worldwide Ecumenical Catholic Church of Christ. He died in Sofia on 3 November 2015.

Professor Plamen Tzvetkov was a scholar and university professor who taught generations of young people. He encouraged them to further on the work in studying and considering the various processes in modern European history and the democratic changes in recent time. For this reason Prof. Tzvetkov's family donated to NBU his private library along with his scholarly and personal archive.

== Bibliography ==
- Bulgaria and the Balkans from Ancient Times until Nowadays (original title: България и Балканите от древността до наши дни. Варна: Зограф, 1998, 800 с.) (ISBN 954-15-0034-X)
- Between Russian Communism and German National Socialism (the medium and small countries in European politics until World War II (Original title: Между руския комунизъм и германския националсоциализъм (средните и малките държави в европейската политика до Втората световна война). София: Херон Прес, 1998.) (ISBN 954-580-050-X)
- Under Hitler's and Stalin's Pressure (the medium and small countries in European politics, 1938-1939 (Original title: Под натиска на Хитлер и Сталин (Средните и малките държави в европейската политика 1938–1939 г.). София: Херон Прес, 1999, 197 с.) (ISBN 954-580-063-1)
- The Soviet-Nazi Bargain, March–September 1939 (Original title: Съветско-нацистката сделка, март-септември 1939. София: Херон Прес, 1999, 280 с.) (ISBN 954-580-064-X)
- Stillborn Alliances, October 1933-October 1935 (Original title: Мъртвородените съюзи, октомври 1933-октомври 1935. София: Херон Прес, 1999, 160 с.) (ISBN 954-580-055-0)
- The Coburgs and Europe: A History of the Saxe-Coburg-Gotha Dynasty in Belgium, Portugal, Bulgaria and Great Britain (Original tile: Кобургите и Европа (История на Сакскобургготската династия в Белгия, Португалия, България и Великобритания). София: Херон Прес, 1999.) (ISBN 954-580-067-4)
- Are the Bulgarians Slavs? (Original title: Славяни ли са Българите. София: Тангра ТанНакРа, 1998, 208 с.) (ISBN 954-9717-03-8)
- Collective Security or Neutrality (the medium and small countries in European politics, October 1935-March 1935 (Original title: Колективна сигурност или неутралитет (Средните и малките държави в европейската политика, октомври 1935 – март 1938). София: Херон Прес, 1999, 280 с.) (ISBN 954-580-053-4)
- Bolshevism, National Socialism, Fascism 1917-1939: European and Balkan Aspects of the Problem (a revised and updated edition) (Original title: Болшевизъм, националсоциализъм, фашизъм 1917–1939: Общоевропейски и балкански аспекти на проблема. Варна: Зограф, 2000, 272) (ISBN 954-15-0073-0)
- Europe in the 20th Century (A Political and Diplomatic History of the European Countries from World War I to the Fall of the Berlin Wall, 1914-1995, Vols.1-2 (Original title: Европа през ХХ век. Политическа и дипломатическа история на европейските държави от Първата световна война до падането на Берлинската стена 1914–1995. Ч.1-2. София, Нов български университет, 2002–2003)
- The World in the 20th Century (Original title: Светът през XX век. София: Нов български университет, 2005, 416 с.) (ISBN 9545354259)
- Ethnic Origin and National Self-Consciousness (Original title: Народностно потекло и национално самосъзнание. София: Нов български университет, 2007.) (ISBN 978-954-535-454-0)^{[6]}
- The World of Megamyths: Some Political and Historiographical Myths of the 20th century (Original title: Светът на мегамитовете: някои политически и историографски митове на 20 век. София: Нов български университет, 2008.) (ISBN 978-954-535-498-4)
- Under the Shadow of Stalin and Hitler (World War II and the Fate of the European Nations, 1939-1941, vol. I. The Beginning of World War II in Europe. published by New Bulgarian University (Original title: Под сянката на Сталин и Хитлер. Том 1: Началото на Втората световна война в Европа. София: Нов български университет, 2014, 724 с.) (ISBN 978-954-535-836-4)
- Under the Shadow of Stalin and Hitler (World War II and the Fate of the European Nations, 1939-1941, vol. II: The European Democracy on the Verge of Annihilation, published by New Bulgarian University (Original title: Под сянката на Сталин и Хитлер. Том 2: Европейската демокрация пред унищожение. София: Нов български университет, 2014, 663 с.) (ISBN 978-954-535-848-7)
- Under the Shadow of Stalin and Hitler (World War II and the Fate of the European Nations, 1939-1941, vol. III: The Partition of Europe, Published by New Bulgarian University(Original title: Под сянката на Сталин и Хитлер. Том 3: Подялбата на Европа. София: Нов български университет, 2015, 694 с.) (ISBN 978-954-535-869-2)
- Under the Shadow of Stalin and Hitler (World War II and the Fate of the European Nations, 1939-1941, vol. IV: World War II and the Destiny of the European peoples. Stalin and Three-Power-Pact, published by New Bulgarian University (Original title: Под сянката на Сталин и Хитлер. Втората световна война и съдбата на европейските народи, 1939-1941 г. Т.4. Сталин и Тристранният пакт. София: НБУ, 2016) (ISBN 9789545359118)
- Review by Prof. Dr. Rumen Genov for the monumental five-volume series "Under the Shadow of Stalin and Hitler"
