= De antiquitate Paterni soli et de rebus Bulgaricis =

Treatise by Petar Bogdan

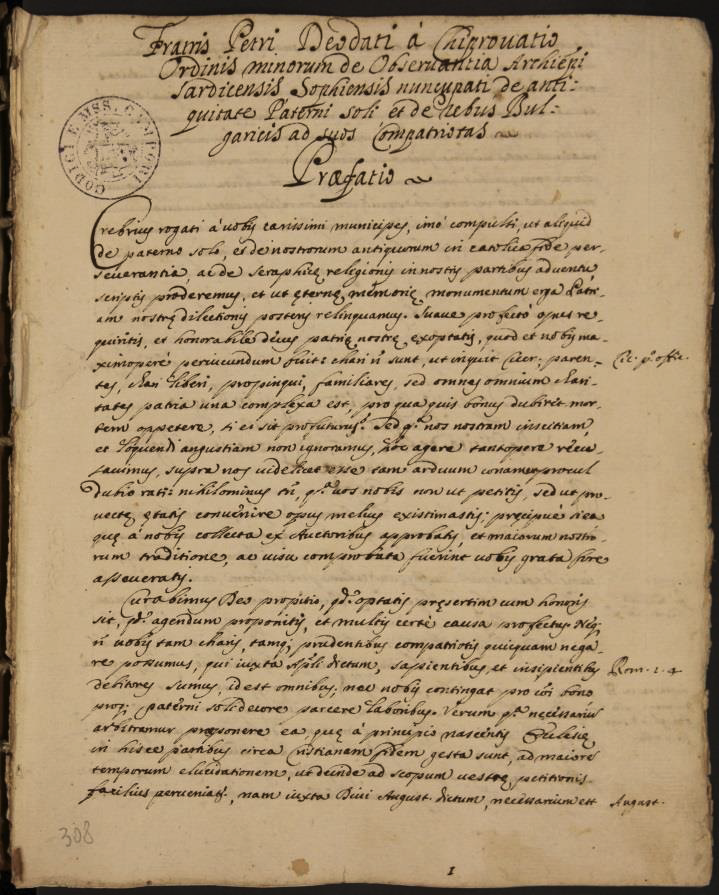
Initial page of the manuscript

De antiquitate Paterni soli et de rebus Bulgaricis ("On the antiquity of the fatherland and the deeds of the Bulgarians") is a historical treatise written in Latin by the Bulgarian Catholic archbishop Petar Bogdan. Completed in 1667, it is the earliest modern written work on the history of Bulgaria, preceding Paisius of Hilendar's Istoriya Slavyanobolgarskaya and Blasius Kleiner's History of Bulgaria by nearly a century.

== History ==
In 1667, Petar Bogdan finished the treatise, which is the oldest history of Bulgaria. It is written in Latin, has 200 pages and is divided into 70 chapters. It covers the Christian past and present of the Bulgarian lands, with the aim of gaining European support for the liberation of those lands from Ottoman rule. The main historical sources Bogdan used include works by Caesar Baronius, Antonio Bonfini, Marcin Kromer, Mavro Orbini, Luke Wadding's Annales Minorum, Charles Vialart, Sixtus of Siena, Petrus de Natalibus, Ivan Tomko Mrnavić and others.

In the foreword, Bogdan wrote:

Many writers have written on Bulgarian history (with what correctness and distinction it is for others to decide). But clearly what has been called for was for someone of this people to bring to light not only things which he has heard or read of in books, but those things he had learnt regarding his fatherland by his own long experience, and distinguish truth from falsehood about the traditions of his ancestors and bring a surer knowledge about the land and the counties, rivers and mountains. I was born in the land of Bulgaria, and now, when I am almost worn out by old age, the same fatherland (patria) supports me like a ship falling apart after long and various journeys. However, I do not intend to cover everything, but my intention is to clear up just a few things, to disperse the errors [lit. darkness/obscurity] spread by others, to defend the ancient roots of the Catholic faith and the rule of the Church in these areas, to tell how the community of the Seraphical Institute [i.e the Franciscan mission] settled down in this land...

The treatise was not known outside limited Catholic circles.

== Legacy ==
Initially, the original manuscript and a copy of it were undiscovered. The existence of the treatise was known from Bogdan's letters and reports. Part of the manuscript was discovered in the Vatican Library by Bozhidar Dimitrov in 1977; it included the introduction, the full text of the first three chapters and part of the fourth chapter. At the end of 2017, professor of comparative linguistics Liliya Ilieva discovered the full text of the treatise in the University of Modena's Biblioteca Estense. All chapters of the treatise were published as a book including a facsimile, a Bulgarian translation by professor of classical languages Tsvetan Vasilev and commentary by Sofia University in 2020.

A reproduction of the treatise was displayed as part of a temporary exhibition at the National Archaeological Museum in Sofia in 2024.
