= Karol Telbizov =

Bulgarian lawyer and journalist

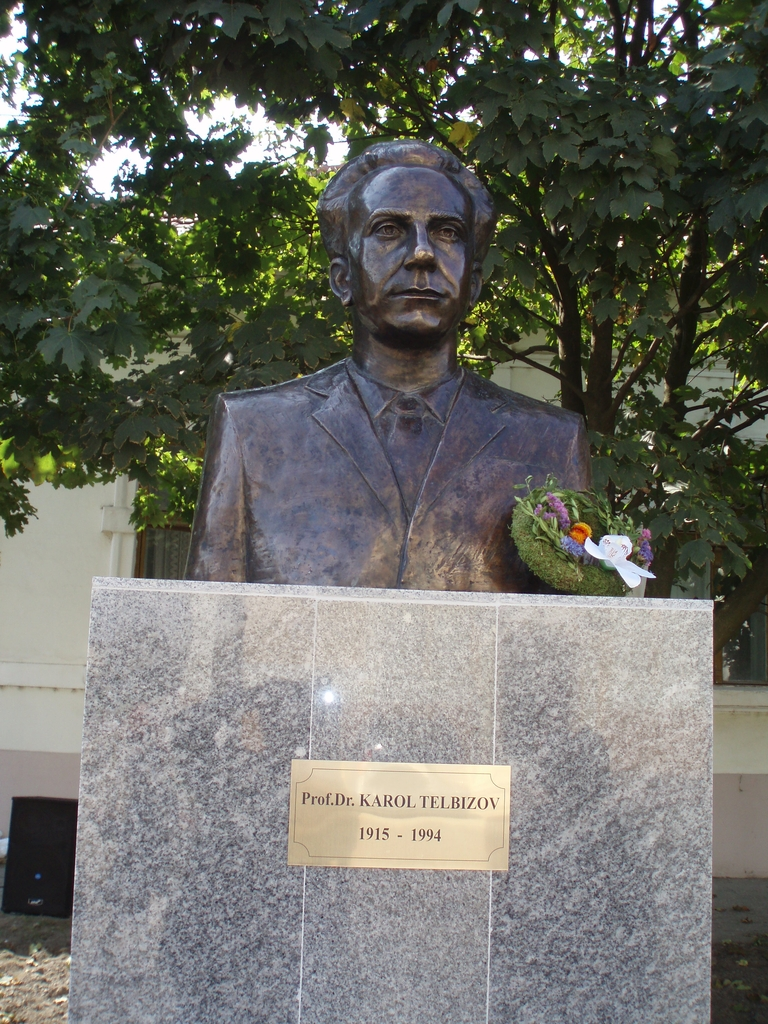

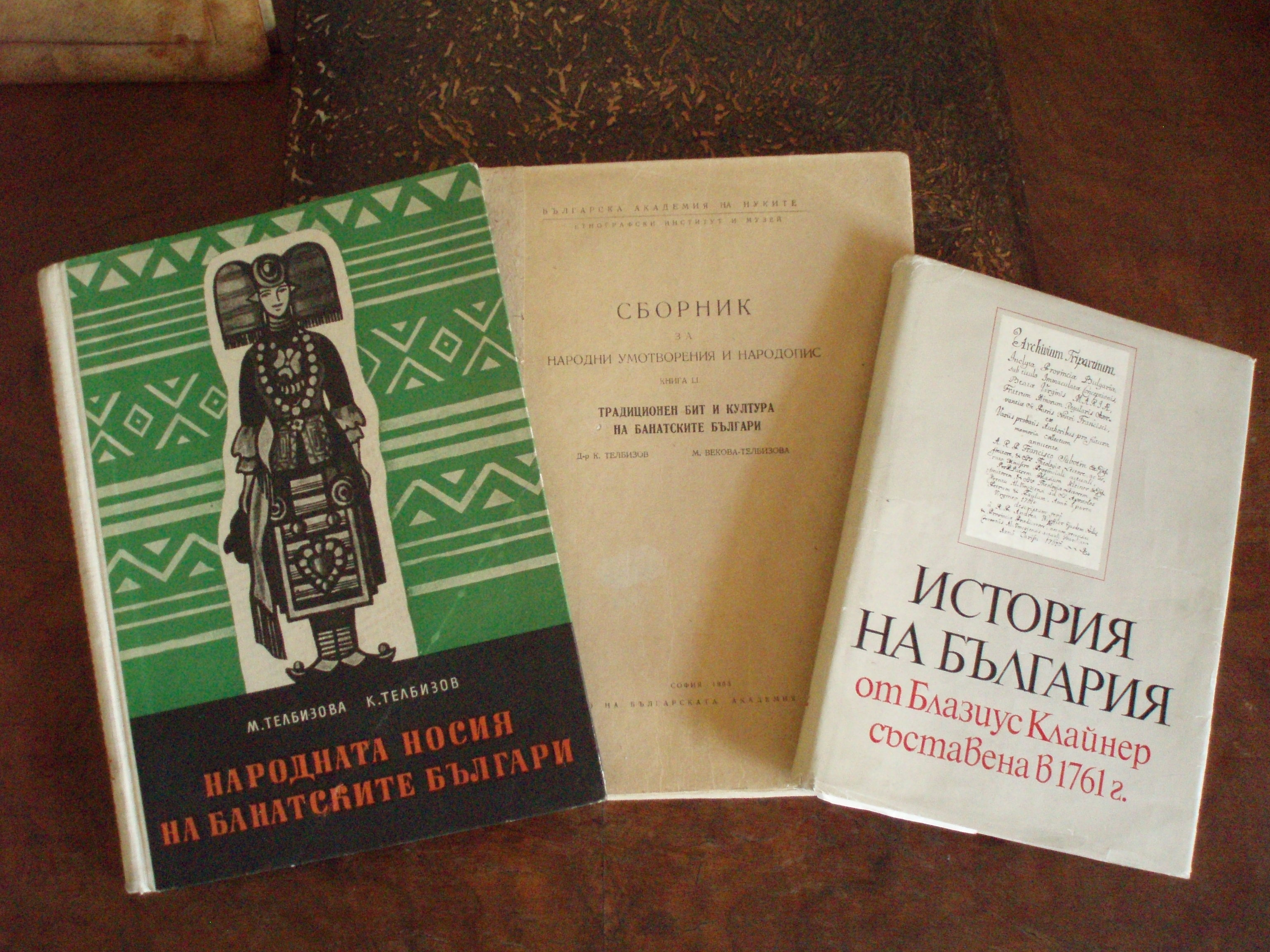

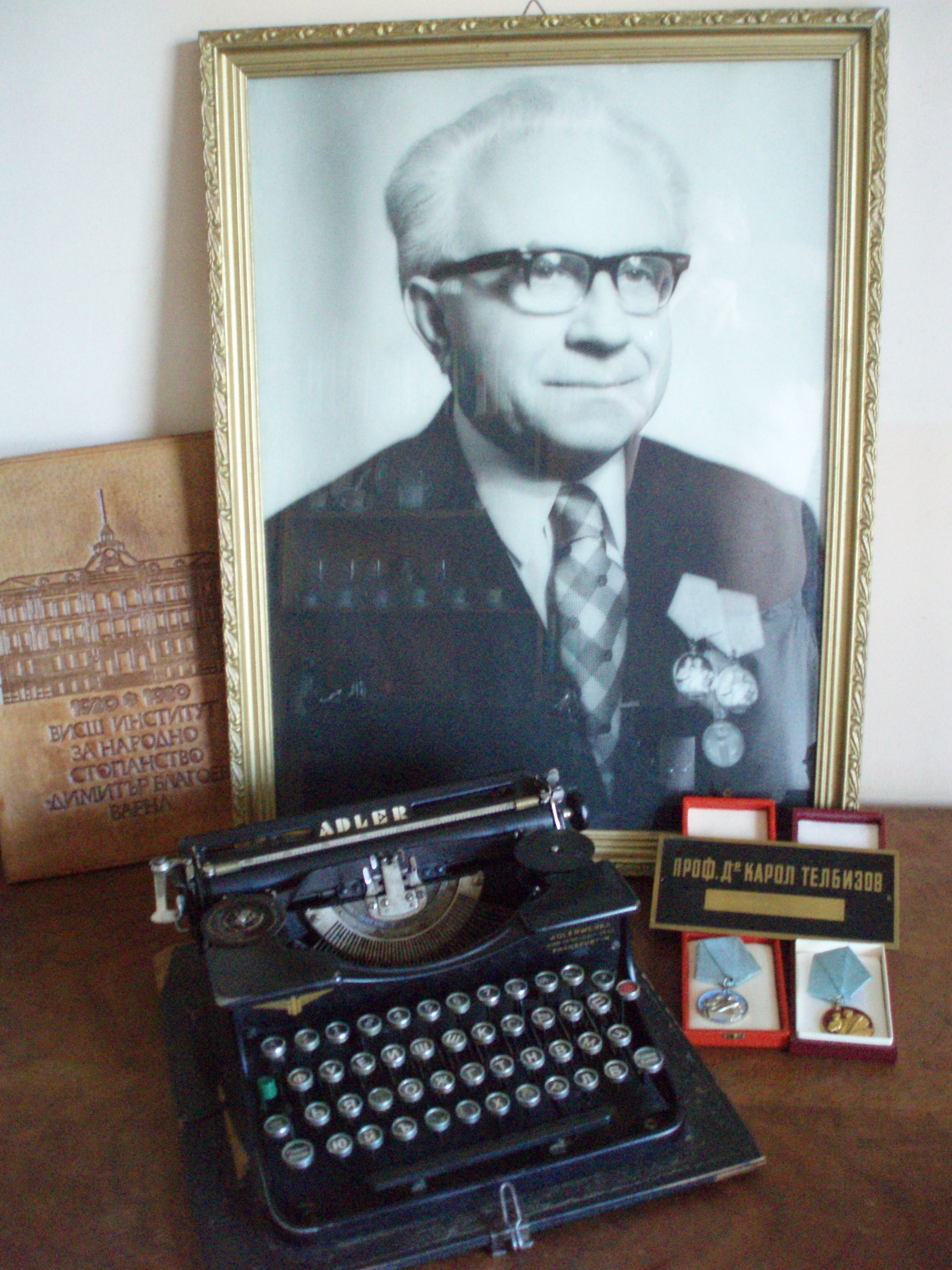

Karol Telbizov (Bulgarian: Карол Телбизов) (1915–1994) was a lawyer, journalist and editor-in-chief of Bulgarian newspaper Banat Bulgarian Voice issued in Romania. He was a dedicated researcher of Banat Bulgarian ethnography, culture and traditional clothing.

== Early life and education ==
Telbizov was born on 10 April 1915 in Stár Bišnov (Romania), the son of a Banat Bulgarian family. He attended a Catholic high school in Timișoara and graduated at the Faculty of Law of the University of Cluj-Napoca. He received his PhD in 1942 in Sofia in government and law studies.

== Career ==
Between 1935 and 1940, Telbizov was a founder and editor-in-chief of Banat Bulgarian Voice, the only newspaper of the Banat Bulgarian community, written in the official dialect of the Bulgarian language. In 1943, he settled in Bulgaria with his family, where he has worked until his death.

From 1946, Telbizov taught law at the University of Economics of Varna and in 1951 at the age of 36 he was promoted to professor. For more than 30 years, he taught law and wrote more than 75 books, monographs and articles. He received the silver and bronze order "Cyril and Methodius" and was honorary citizen of city of Chiprovtsi.

In 1977, Telbizov published and coedited with historian Duichev the History of Bulgaria based on the work of Blasius Kleiner, which was written in Latin in 1761.

Telbizov dedicated his whole life to the research of the Banat Bulgarian culture. With his wife, Maria Vekova-Telbizova, he published books in 1958 on the traditional Banat Bulgarian clothes and in 1963 the Compilation of the Banat Bulgarian ethnography and cultural heritage. In 2011, a statue was erected in his honour in the village where he was born.

Telbizov was laid to rest on 3 August 1994 in Varna/Topolite. The archives of Varna keeps parts of his personal documents and correspondence.
