= Blasius Kleiner =

Franciscan friar (died 1785)

Blasius Kleiner (died 1785) was a Franciscan friar who wrote the History of Bulgaria one year before Paisius of Hilendar's Istoriya Slavyanobolgarskaya.

== Life ==
Not much is known about Kleiner. He was probably of German (Saxon) origin. As a Franciscan friar, he lived in the town of Alvinc (now Vinţu de Jos, Romania) in Transylvania. He apparently maintained close relations with the Bulgarian immigrants there, as they had fled to Transylvania after the failure of the 1688 Chiprovtsi uprising. In 1762, he became the abbot of the Franciscan monastery in Alvinc, which was created by the Bulgarian immigrants. From 1773 to 1776, Kleiner served as a parish councilor of the Bulgarian community. He decided to write the history of the Bulgarian people and what he referred to as "glorious deeds", and the Bulgarian Catholic movement. As he regarded himself as an "adopted son" of the Bulgarian community, he considered it was his duty to write it. Kleiner used the works by Caesar Baronius, Luke Wadding, Raffaello Maffei, Paolo Giovio and Antonio Bonfini. He wrote the book in Latin in 1761, preceding Paisius of Hilendar's book Istoriya Slavyanobolgarskaya by one year. It is about the period from the establishment of the Bulgarian medieval statehood to the conquest of Constantinople by the Ottomans in 1453. His book did not have an impact on the early Bulgarian Revival. Kleiner died in 1785.

Kleiner's manuscript remained in the Franciscan archives in Budapest, which was discovered and translated into Bulgarian by Karol Telbizov and edited by Ivan Duichev. His book was published in Bulgaria for the first time in 1977.

== See also ==
- Petar Bogdan
