= Spiridon Gabrovski =

Bulgarian clergyman (1740–1824)

- Born: 1740; Gabrovo, Ottoman Empire
- Died: 1824 (aged 83–84); Rila Monastery, Ottoman Empire
- Occupation: Clergyman
- Notable work: A brief history of the Bulgarian Slavic people

Spiridon Gabrovski (1740–1824), also known as Spiridon Rilski, was a Bulgarian clergyman and national revivalist in the Ottoman Empire. He authored the 1792 book A brief history of the Bulgarian Slavic people.

== Life ==
Spiridon was born in Gabrovo in 1740. He worked on Mount Athos, spending many years in the Zograf Monastery and the Hilandar Monastery. Between 1747 and 1763, due to disagreement between the Bulgarian and Serbian monks there, he settled in the Pantokrator Monastery, with his spiritual father, the hermit Paisius Velichkovsky. In 1763, together with Velichkovsky, they left Mount Athos and went to Moldavia with 64 other monks. In 1779, the group settled in the Neamț Monastery near Iași.

Spiridon was a Bulgarian revivalist. He used the library of the monastery to supplement his knowledge and in 1792, he managed to complete the book A brief history of the Bulgarian Slavic people. The book contains a wealth of factual material freely used by him. Spiridon approached the so-called Illyrism, which declares the ancient Illyrians, to be early Slavs. Spiridon tried to legitimize the Bulgarians ("Illyrians") through Alexander the Great, presented entirely in a positive light. Alexander defeated the "Illyrian" king Perun, but included the Illyrians in his army and even gave the two sons of Perun the power over Macedonia itself, and he himself established his capital in Babylon.

In 1794, after the death of Velichkovsky, he left the Neamț Monastery and settled finally in the Rila Monastery, where he died in 1824.
