= Miliana Kaimakamova =

Bulgarian historian & mediaevalist

Miliana Vasileva Kaimakamova (Bulgarian: Милияна Василева Каймакамова; born 22 January 1951) is a Bulgarian medieval historian, whose work on Bulgarian medieval historiography is foundational to the discipline. She is Professor of History at Sofia University.

== Biography ==
Kaymakamova was born on 22 January 1951 in Smolyan. In 1973 she graduated with a degree in History & Archaeology from Sofia University. In 1985 she was awarded the scientific title of associate professor. From 1972 to 1979 she was an assistant professor of medieval Bulgarian history in the Faculty of History at Sofia University. In 1979 she defended her dissertation on "Historical and chronicle tradition in medieval Bulgaria - VII-XII centuries" and was awarded a doctorate in history.

In 1979 she was appointed as a lecturer at Sofia University, where as of 2022 she was Professor of Medieval History. She specialises in Bulgarian medieval history and the relationships between Bulgars and Slavs in the medieval period. In 1985 she was appointed Associate Professor of History. In 1990 she published Bulgarian Medieval Historiography, a work considered foundational to the discipline.

== Awards and recognition ==
In 2021 she was presented with the Order of Saints Cyril and Methodius, in recognition of her achievements in the field of medieval history. In 1996 Sofia University awarded her the St. Kliment Ohridski Ribbon for her services to teaching.

== Selected works ==
- Власт и история в средновековна България (VII-XIV век) [Power and history in medieval Bulgaria (VII-XIV century)] (Paradigm, 2011)
- Българска средновековна историопис [Bulgarian Medieval HistoriographyI] (Science and Art, 1990)
