= Mavro Orbini =

Ragusan historian (1563–1610)

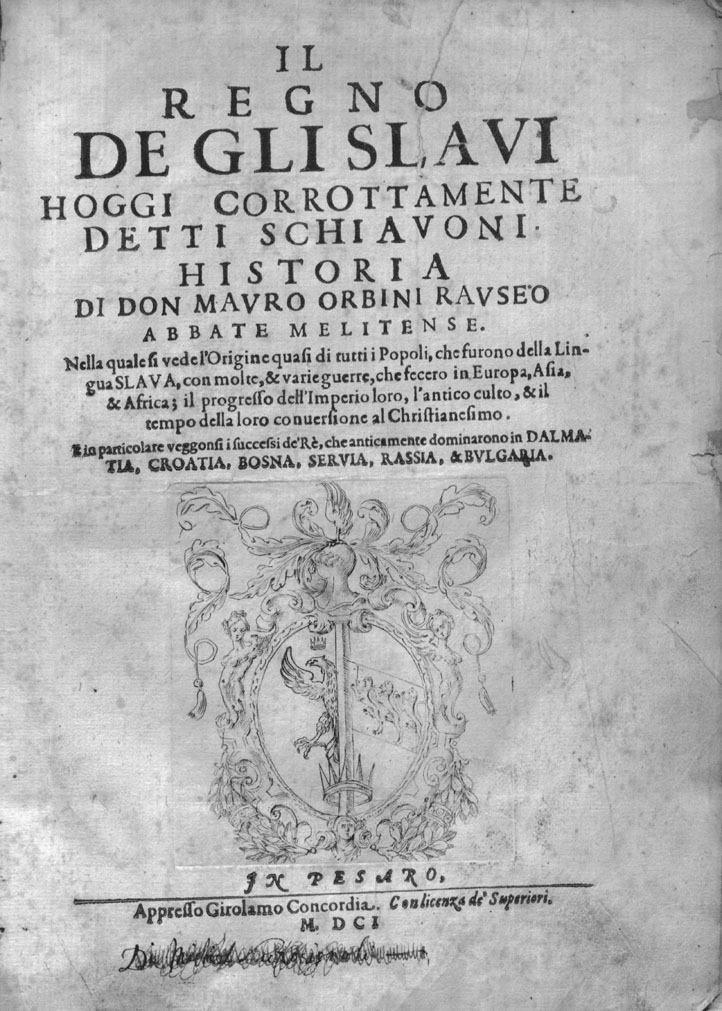
- Cover of the first edition of "Regno de gli Slavi", written by Mavro Orbini
- Born: 1563; Ragusa, Republic of Ragusa (now Dubrovnik, Croatia)
- Died: 1610
- Other name: Mavro Orbini
- Occupation: writer
- Known for: influencing Pan-Slavism

Mavro Orbini (1563–1610) was a Ragusan chronicler, notable for his work The Realm of the Slavs (1601) which influenced Slavic ideology and historiography in the later centuries.

== Life ==
Orbini was born in Ragusa (now Dubrovnik), the capital of the Republic of Ragusa, a Slavic-populated merchant city-state on the eastern shore of the Adriatic Sea. His name in Slavic was written by himself as Mavar Orbin. He was mentioned for the first time in sources dating to 1592.

At 15 years old, he joined the Benedictines. After becoming a monk, he lived for a while in the monasteries on the island of Mljet where he was elected abbot and later in Ston. In the Kingdom of Hungary he was the abbot of the Benedictine monastery in Bačka (in Serbia) for a short time. Afterwards, he returned to Ragusa, where he spent the rest of his life.

Like most Dalmatian intellectuals of his time, he was familiar with the pan-Slavic ideology of Vinko Pribojević. He made a very important contribution to that ideology by writing The Realm of the Slavs in Italian, a historical/ideological book published in Pesaro in 1601. This uncritical history of the South Slavs was translated into Russian by Sava Vladislavich in 1722, with a preface by Feofan Prokopovich. From then on, the book exerted a significant influence on the ideas of Slavic peoples about themselves and on the European ideas on Slavs.

Like Pribojević, Orbini unifies the Illyrian and Slavic mythic identities and interprets history from a pan-Slavic mythological position. Since Orbini lived on the very edge of the Slavic free lands, he glorified the multitude of Slavic peoples (primarily Russians and Poles) to counteract the aggressiveness of the Germanic, Italian (Venice) and Ottoman empires. One of Orbini's probable sources was Ludovik Crijević Tuberon.

Orbini also published a book in Serbo-Croatian, Spiritual Mirror (Zrcalo duhovno, 1595), which was essentially a translation of the Italian work by Angelo Nelli. This text, translated into the "Ragusan language", as Orbin called the local Slavic vernacular, has cultural and historical importance as an example of prose of the 16th century. His work was one of few primary sources about the 1385 Battle of Savra, although it contains many incorrect and imprecise data about this battle.

== Legacy ==
Aside from its ideological background, Orbin's main work was used for a long time as one of the few sources for segments of late medieval history of the South Slavs, from Carinthia and the Slovene Lands to Serbia and Bulgaria.

Even today's historiography is often uncertain about how much truth there is in some of his writings and claims. Historian Solange Bujan argues that Orbini created a false historical document based on contemporary unpublished sources and Benedictine texts, such as excerpts from recently published works by Byzantine historians, intended to lend credibility to the story, and that the real and authentic medieval historical texts are the Dubrovnik chronicle Annales Ragusini Anonymi and the text Regum Dalmatiae et Croatiae gesta by Marko Marulić, which has so far been considered a concise overview of Orbini's The Realm of the Slavs.

Orbin's work The Realm of the Slavs was the main source used by Paisius of Hilendar to write his Istoriya Slavyanobolgarskaya, the most influential work of early Bulgarian historiography, in 1762. He is referred to in the book as "a certain Mavrubir, a Latin"

Also, Orbin's works directly influenced the Slavic Macedonian General History manuscript by Gjorgjija Pulevski, who is considered as one of the founding figures of Macedonian nationalism.

Orbin has been called the "Dalmatian Thucydides".

== Anthropology ==
Orbin believed that the Slavs hailed from the Goths in Scandinavia. He also claimed that the Illyrians spoke Slavic. He supported Pribojević's view that Alexander the Great and the Macedonians were Slavs.

== Works ==
- De Ultimo Fine Humanæ Vitæ Vel Summo Bono, before 1590
- Orbini, Mauro (1601). Il Regno de gli Slavi hoggi corrottamente detti Schiavoni. Pesaro: Apresso Girolamo Concordia.
- Zarçalo dvhovno od pocetka, i sfarhe xivota coviecanskoga (Spiritual Mirror ...), written in 1606, published posthumously in 1614 (republished later in 1621 in Venice, and again in 1703)

== See also ==
- List of notable Ragusans

== Sources ==
- Bujan, Solange (2008). "La Chronique du prêtre de Dioclée: Un faux document historique". Revue des études byzantines. 66: 5–38.
- Bujan, Solange (2011). "Orbinijevo izdanje Ljetopisa popa Dukljanina: Povijesni falsifikat". Radovi Zavoda za hrvatsku povijest. 43: 65–80.
- Ćirković, Sima (2011). "Izvori Mavra Orbina: Addenda et corrigenda". Radovi Zavoda za hrvatsku povijest. 43: 57–64.
- Ćosić, Stjepan (2011). "Mavro Orbini i raskol dubrovačkog patricijata". Radovi Zavoda za hrvatsku povijest. 43: 37–56.
- Martinović, Ivica (2021). "Filozofska sastavnica Zrcala duhovnog (1614) Mavra Orbina". Prilozi za istraživanje hrvatske filozofske baštine. 47 (94 (2)): 155–415.
- Орбин, Мавро (1968). Краљевство Словена. Београд: Српска књижевна задруга.
- Orbini, Mavro (1999). Kraljevstvo Slavena (PDF). Zagreb: Golden marketing; Narodne novine.
- Šanjek, Franjo (1999). "Povijesni pogledi Marvra Orbinija" (PDF). Kraljevstvo Slavena. Zagreb: Golden marketing; Narodne novine. pp. 7–54.
- NASSS (1986). Serbian Studies. North American Society for Serbian Studies.
