= Paisius of Hilendar =

18th-century Bulgarian clergyman

Saint Paisius of Hilendar Свети Паисий Хилендарски Sveti Paisiy Hilendarski
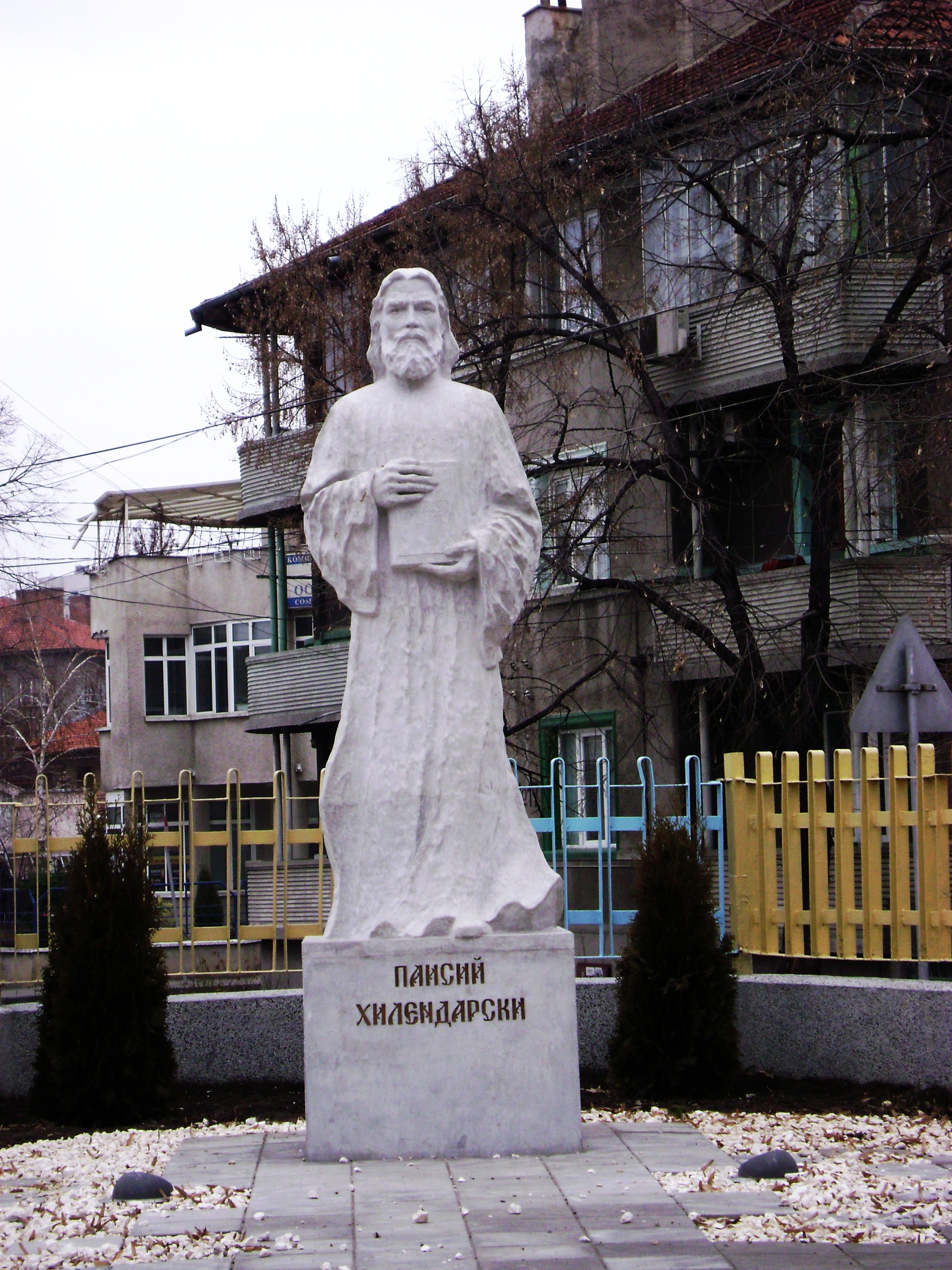
- Monument of Paisius of Hilendar in Silistra, Bulgaria

Venerable
- Born: c. 1722; Bansko (?), Samokov eparchy (diocese), Ottoman Empire (now Bulgaria)
- Died: c. 1773; Near Ambelino (now part of Asenovgrad), Ottoman Empire (now Bulgaria)
- Venerated in: Bulgarian Orthodox Church
- Canonized: 26 June 1962 by the Bulgarian Orthodox Church
- Feast: 19 June
- Patronage: Bulgaria
- Major works: Istoriya Slavyanobolgarskaya

Paisius of Hilendar or Paìsiy Hilendàrski (Bulgarian: Паисий Хилендарски; 1722–1773) was a Bulgarian Orthodox clergyman and a key figure of the Bulgarian National Revival. He is most famous for being the author of Istoriya Slavyanobolgarskaya (Slav-Bulgarian History, 1762), the first significant modern Bulgarian history. The book is, overall, the third modern work of Bulgarian history, after the works titled History of Bulgaria by Petar Bogdan Bakshev in 1667 and by Blasius Kleiner in 1761. He is considered the forefather of the Bulgarian National Revival. In 1962, he was canonised as a saint by the Bulgarian Orthodox Church.

== Life ==
Biographical information about Paisius is scarce. Paisius was born in the Samokov eparchy into the family of the merchant Bilyu Baanov. Academics refer to the town of Bansko as his birthplace. Paisius specified his birth year as 1722. His family was wealthy. He had two brothers: Lazar (Lavrentiy) and Valcho. Lavrentiy served as the abbot of the Hilandar Monastery, while Valcho was a wealthy merchant and benefactor who served as a patron of the Hilandar Monastery and Zograf Monastery. Although he did not receive a formal education, Paisius entered the Rila Monastery as a novice.

He established himself in the Hilandar Monastery at Mount Athos in 1745, where he was a hieromonk and deputy abbot. He was appointed as a traveling monk who collected aid and voluntary donations for the monasteries. In the following years, holding the rank of pro-hegumen, Paisius continued his work by visiting villages and towns to gain support and attract pilgrims to the monastery. In 1758, he travelled to the Sremski Karlovci Monastery, seeking historical sources on Bulgarian history, which were essential for the composition of his book Istoriya Slavyanobolgarskaya (Slav-Bulgarian History). Among the sources he consulted were the Russian translation of Cardinal Caesar Baronius's Annales Ecclesiastici and Mavro Orbini's Kingdom of the Slavs. In 1761, Paisius returned to Hilandar Monastery and began working intensively on his manuscript. However, due to disagreements with the other monks, he was compelled to leave and relocate to Zograf Monastery, where, in 1762, he completed the book. The book was the first attempt to write a complete history of Bulgaria and attempted to awaken and strengthen Bulgarian national consciousness.

The most famous part of the whole book is the paragraph:

Oh, you unwise moron! Why are you ashamed to call yourself a Bulgarian and why don't you read and speak in your native language? Weren't Bulgarians powerful and glorious once? Didn't they take taxes from strong Romans and wise Greeks? Out of all the Slavic nations they were the bravest one. Our rulers were the first ones to call themselves emperors, the first ones to have patriarchs, the first ones to baptise their people. […] Why are you ashamed of your great history and your great language and why do you leave it to turn yourselves into Greeks? Why do you think they are any better than you? Well, here you're right because did you see a Greek leave his country and ancestry like you do?

Per historian Roumen Daskalov, the primary goal of the book had been to reveal the Greek spiritual domination and to motivate his compatriots against it. He advocated against Hellenisation.

Per historian Richard Frucht: "Typical of many works in the revivals of the various nationalities in Southeastern Europe, the tome is as much polemical as it is factual. Filled with errors that are often self-serving, the short book, written in Old Bulgarian (or Old Church Slavonic) glorified everything Bulgarian, while blaming others, notably the Byzantines, for the travails faced by the people". He glorified the medieval Bulgarian tsars and people, while calling for the oppression from Ottoman authorities and Greek ecclesiastical authorities to be lifted. In the book, he inserted negative stereotypes about Greeks, depicting them as "educated and polished, but haughty and arrogant, cunning, deceitful, dishonest and avaricious", contrasting them with the "honest and reliable, generous and hospitable Bulgarians". For him, the Bulgarians' main enemies during the Middle Ages were the "Greeks", i.e. the Byzantines. His primary motivation was to attempt to discredit Greek views that the Bulgarians had always been people subjugated to the Greeks, to prove that they had had their own state, church and high culture, and to show that the Byzantine military power and the brilliance of Byzantine culture were false. He depicted the "Greek emperors" as deceitful and ruthless. Paisius referred to a "Greek yoke" over the Bulgarians. He also blamed the Greeks for the Ottoman conquest. Paisius did not distinguish between the Byzantines and the modern Greeks, referring to the "Eastern Greek Empire", "Greek emperors" and "Greek land" when writing about the Byzantine Empire. Paisius used "Greek" as a synonym for "Byzantine", but he gave it an ethnic meaning which it originally lacked. His book did not have significant influence during his lifetime. Paisius himself was not very known during the Bulgarian National Revival. In 1765, during one of his journeys to Kotel, Paisius met Sophronius of Vratsa. Sophronius of Vratsa also made the first transcript of his book. The second transcript was made by Aleksi Popovich of Samokov in 1771. In 1772, the monk Nikifor Rilski made a new transcript based on Popovich's copy. In 1774, Doyno Gramatik, a teacher from the town of Elena, transcribed and supplemented the history. In total, there are 60 known transcribed copies of his book. It is generally accepted in scholarship that he died in 1773 while en route to Mount Athos, near Ambelino (now a neighborhood of Asenovgrad, Bulgaria).

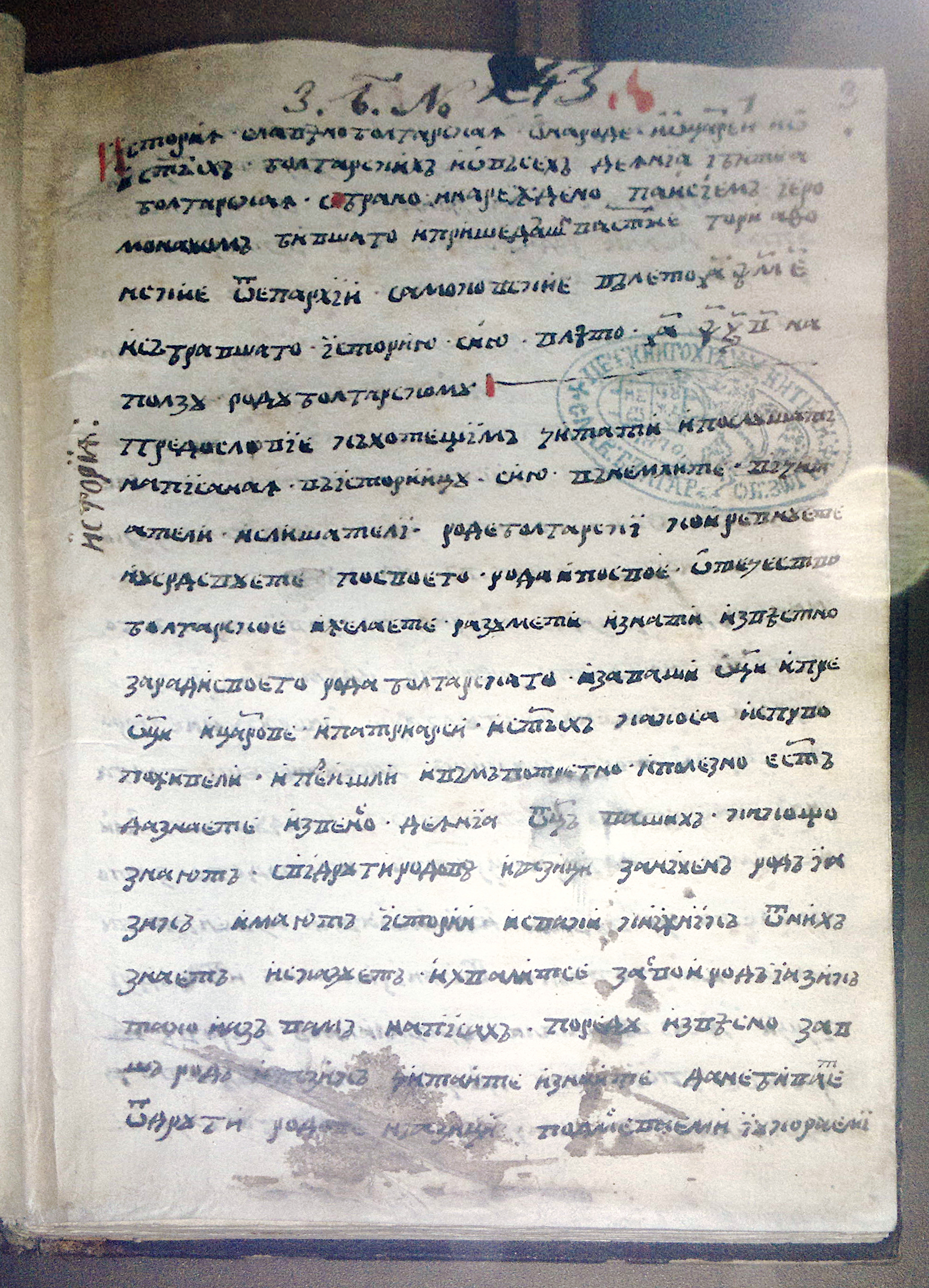
First page of a manuscript of Istoriya slavyanobulgarska

== Legacy ==
The first printed edition of his book appeared in 1844 under the title Tsarstvenik ("Book of Tsars"). He was popularised as the father of the Bulgarian National Awakening by historian Marin Drinov in 1871. Theodosius of Skopje contributed to the construction of the image of Macedonia as the "cradle of the Bulgarian Revival" by promoting Bansko as his birthplace. On 26 June 1962, he was canonised by the Bulgarian Orthodox Church's Holy Synod with the title of "Venerable". He is venerated by the Bulgarian Orthodox Church as a saint, sharing a feast day with his namesake, St. Paisius the Great, on 19 June.

Paisiy Peak on Livingston Island in the South Shetland Islands, Antarctica, is named after Paisius of Hilendar. A state university in Plovdiv is named after him.

He was portrayed on the obverse of the Bulgarian 2 lev banknote, issued in 1999 and 2005 as well as the 2 lev coins from 2015. The first Bulgarian 2 euro coin from 2026 also features him.
