= Ivan Duichev =

Bulgarian historian and paleographer

- Born: May 1, 1907
- Died: April 24, 1986 (aged 78)

Academic background
- Education: Sapienza University of Rome; Sofia University

Academic work
- Discipline: History
- Institutions: Sofia University

Ivan Simeonov Duichev (Bulgarian: Иван Симеонов Дуйчев; May 1, 1907, Sofia - April 24, 1986, Sofia) was a Bulgarian historian and paleographer with a focus on Bulgarian and Byzantine medieval history. Throughout his scientific and research life he has followed the maxim of his teacher Vasil Zlatarski that Bulgarian history is inextricably linked and incomprehensible without Byzantine history.

He specialized and defended his doctorate at the University of Rome on the topic "Asen dynasty in Byzantium". He is a graduate of the Vatican School of Paleography, Diplomatics and Archives Administration. The patron saint of Cardinal Angelo Mercati, the Vatican Apostolic Archive Archbishop, is the patron and mentor.

After the Balkan campaign, he worked on the ground in Macedonia. Translator of the Italian Headquarters and Commandant's Office in Greece during the Second World War. In 1945, for the purpose of educating and publicizing the war in support of the Macedonian Bulgarians, the new Greek authorities included Ivan Duychev in a list of Bulgarian, Italian, and German military and other individuals to be tried in Athens as war criminals. Duichev is accused in particular of "the theft and removal of Greek cultural values from Greece to Bulgaria", such as the Greek authorities' interpretation of the Bulgarian cultural heritage on the territory of Greece, and in particular in Aegean Macedonia, which Duichev saved from plunder. a side of anti-Bulgarian Greek partisans.

Member of the Accademia di Belle Arti di Palermo, Corresponding Member of the British Academy (London), Member of the Pontifical Academy of Archeology (Rome), winner of the Herder Prize (1974). His scientific output includes over 500 publications.

Its name is given by the Institute for Slavic-Byzantine Studies at Sofia University. He has been called "the father of Bulgarian archival studies". He has become the prototype of the professor-medievalist in the novel by Elisabeth Kostova The Historian (2005).

Ivan Duichev contributed to the definitive methodological continuity perception of the medieval history of Bulgaria with respect to Byzantine Bulgaria and Ottoman Bulgaria.

== See also ==
- Golden Age of medieval Bulgarian culture
- Bulgarian historiography
- Cyrillo-Methodian Studies
