= Kingdom of the Slavs =

1601 book about the history of the Slavic people

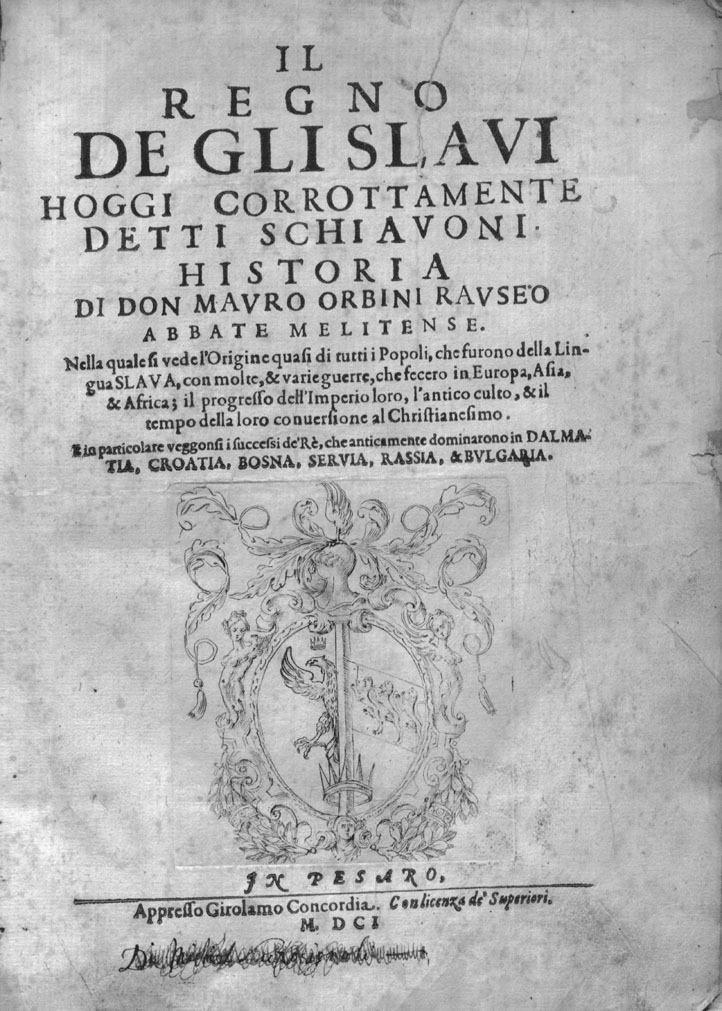
Il Regno de gli Slavi

The Kingdom of the Slavs (Italian: Il Regno de gli Slavi) is a book by Mavro Orbini published in the Italian city of Pesaro in 1601. The book provided a history of the Slavic peoples.

Following the Chronicle of the Priest of Duklja, Orbini identified the Goths with the Slavs and presented the wars and victories of the Goths, Ostrogoths and Visigoths as Slavic. Like Vinko Pribojević and many other writers, he derived the name of the Slavs from slava ('glory'); he knew Marcin Kromer's derivation from slovo ('word') but did not accept it. The book drew on a corpus of more than three hundred ancient, medieval and humanist authors.

The historical context of the work is the Long Turkish War and the loss of the position of the southern Slavs in the rule of the Ottoman Empire after the hanging of Michael Kantakouzenos Şeytanoğlu (March 3, 1578) and the assassination of Grand Vizier Sokollu Mehmed Pasha (October 11, 1579). The Venetian Republic, through its protégés, Valide Sultanas, succeeded in displacing the Republic of Dubrovnik from its position in the Mediterranean trade by constructing a port in Split.

In 1603 the book was placed on the Index of Prohibited Books, mainly because Orbini had drawn on German Protestant historians. Zrinka Blažević describes it as one of the earliest formulations of pan-Slavic ideology. It influenced Croatian writers such as Pavao Ritter Vitezović and Andrija Kačić Miošić, and Serbian, Russian and Bulgarian historiography, including Đorđe Branković, Jovan Rajić and Paisius of Hilendar. A Russian translation by Savva Raguzinsky, made on the order of Peter the Great, was published in Saint Petersburg in 1722 under the title Книга историография початия имене, славы и разширения народа славянского.

It is unclear how much truth there is in the book. Historian Solange Bujan argues that Orbini created a false historical document based on contemporary unpublished sources and Benedictine texts, such as excerpts from recently published works by Byzantine historians, intended to lend credibility to the story, and that the real and authentic medieval historical texts are the Dubrovnik chronicle Annales Ragusini Anonymi and the text Regum Dalmatiae et Croatiae gesta by Marko Marulić, which has so far been considered a concise overview of Orbini's The Realm of the Slavs.

== See also ==
- Grandfather Ivan
- Moscow, third Rome
