= Zograf Monastery =

Eastern Orthodox monastery, Mount Athos

Zografou Monastery
- Ζωγράφου
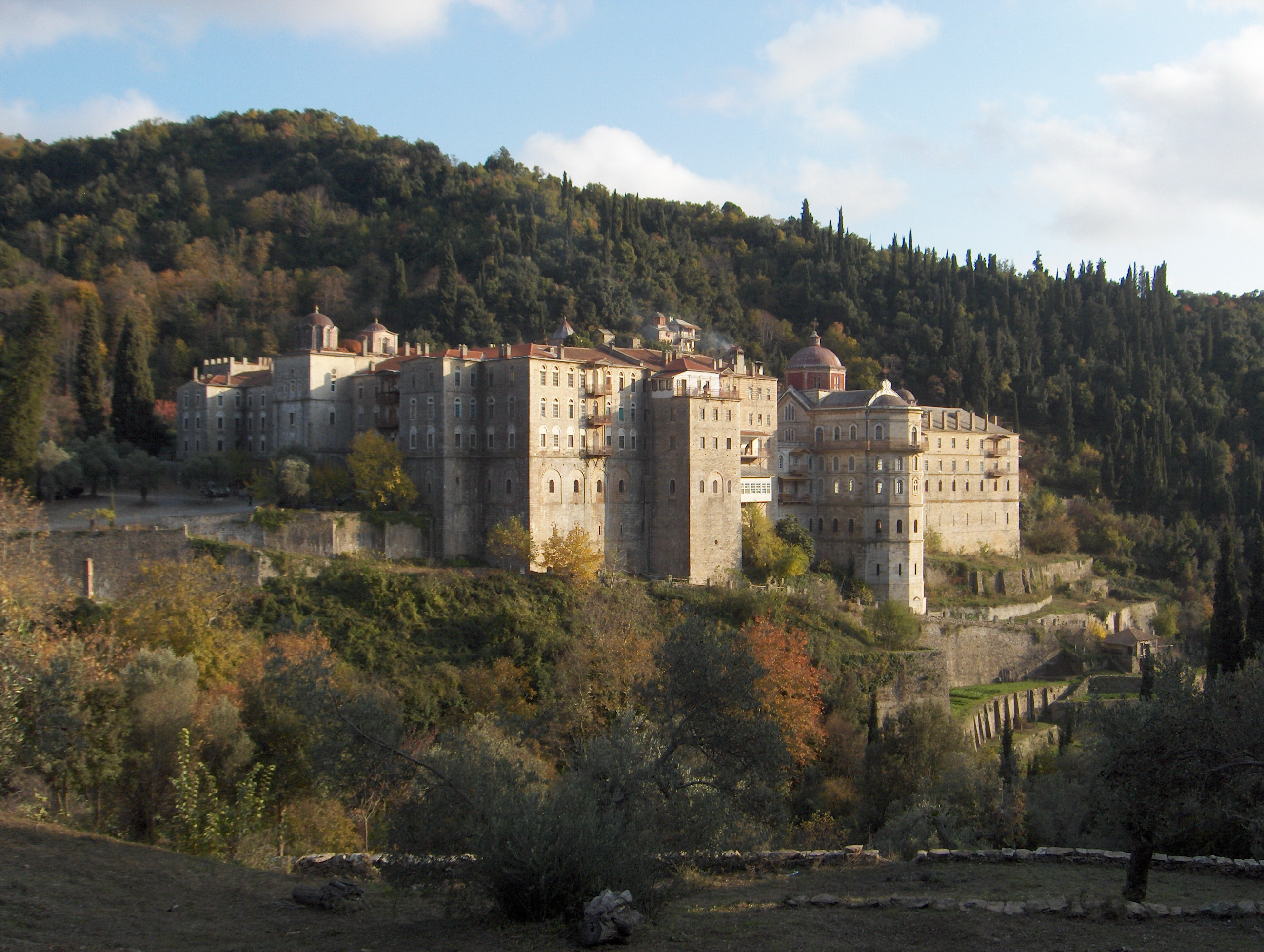
- External view of the monastery

- Location within Greece
- Interactive map of Zografou Monastery

Monastery information
- Full name: Holy Monastery of Zografou
- Order: Ecumenical Patriarchate of Constantinople
- Denomination: Bulgarian Orthodox Church
- Established: Late 9th or early 10th century, 919 in some sources
- Dedication: Saint George
- Diocese: Mount Athos

People
- Founders: Moses, Aaron and John (all from Ohrid)

Architecture
- Status: Monastery
- Functional status: Active

Site
- Location: Mount Athos, North Aegean, Greece
- Coordinates: 40°18′21″N 24°09′37″E
- Public access: Men only
- Website: zograf.eu

The Saint George the Zograf Monastery or Zograf Monastery (Greek: Μονή Ζωγράφου, Moní Zográphou; Bulgarian: Зографски манастир) is one of the twenty Eastern Orthodox monasteries in Mount Athos (the "Holy Mountain") in the North Aegean region of Greece. It was founded in the late 9th or early 10th century by three Bulgarians from Ohrid and is regarded as the historical Bulgarian monastery on Mount Athos, and is traditionally inhabited by Bulgarian Orthodox monks.

The monastery is named after the 13th or 14th century icon of Saint George, known as Saint George the Zograf (Светѝ Гео̀рги Зогра̀ф). The name of the latter comes from the belief that the icon mysteriously painted itself on the prepared board (zograf(os) in Greek means "painter" (from zoe="life" and graphos="scribe").

== History ==
The earliest written evidence of the monastery's existence dates from 980. During the Middle Ages, the monastery was generously supported by the Bulgarian rulers, such as Ivan Asen II and Ivan Alexander, since it was a matter of pride for the Bulgarian Orthodox Church to maintain a monastery on Athos. The Zograf Monastery has also received land endowments by Byzantine (the first donor being Leo VI the Wise) and Serbian rulers.

The Zograf Monastery was plundered and burnt down by Crusaders, working under orders from the Byzantine emperor Michael VIII Palaiologos, in 1275, resulting in the death of 26 monks. These included the igumen (abbot) Thomas, as well as the monks Barsanuphius, Cyril, Micah, Simon, Hilarion, James, Job, Cyprian, Sabbas, James, Martinian, Cosmas, Sergius, Paul, Menas, Ioasaph, Ioanicius, Anthony, Euthymius, Dometian, Parthenius, and four laymen.

The reason for this attack was the opposition of the Athonite monks to the Union of Lyons, which the Emperor had supported for political reasons. Having hanged the Protos (the elected president of Mount Athos), and having killed many monks in Vatopedi, Iveron and other monasteries, the Latins attacked Zographou. Their martyrdom is commemorated annually on October 10 (October 23 on the Gregorian Calendar) throughout the Eastern Orthodox Church.

Mercenaries of the Catalan Grand Company raided the Holy Mountain for two years (1307–9), sacking many monasteries, plundering the treasures of Christendom, and terrorising the monks. Of the 300 monasteries on Athos at the beginning of the 14th century, only 35 were left by the end. But the monastery recovered quickly with the help of grants and support from the Palaeologue Emperors and the princes of the Moldavian and Wallachian Principalities. The buildings were reconstructed in the late 13th century with the financial aid of Byzantine Emperor Andronicus II Palaeologus. The monastery was also given numerous metochia (properties) in parts of Romania, Bulgaria, Russia, and modern-day Turkey, but retains today only those in Greece.

The monastery exists in its modern appearance since the 16th century, while its present-day buildings date from the middle 18th century. The south wing was built in 1750, the east in 1758, the small church was erected in 1764 and the large one in 1801. The north and west wing are from the second half of the 19th century and large-scale construction ended in 1896 with the Saints Cyril and Methodius Church and the raising of the bell tower.

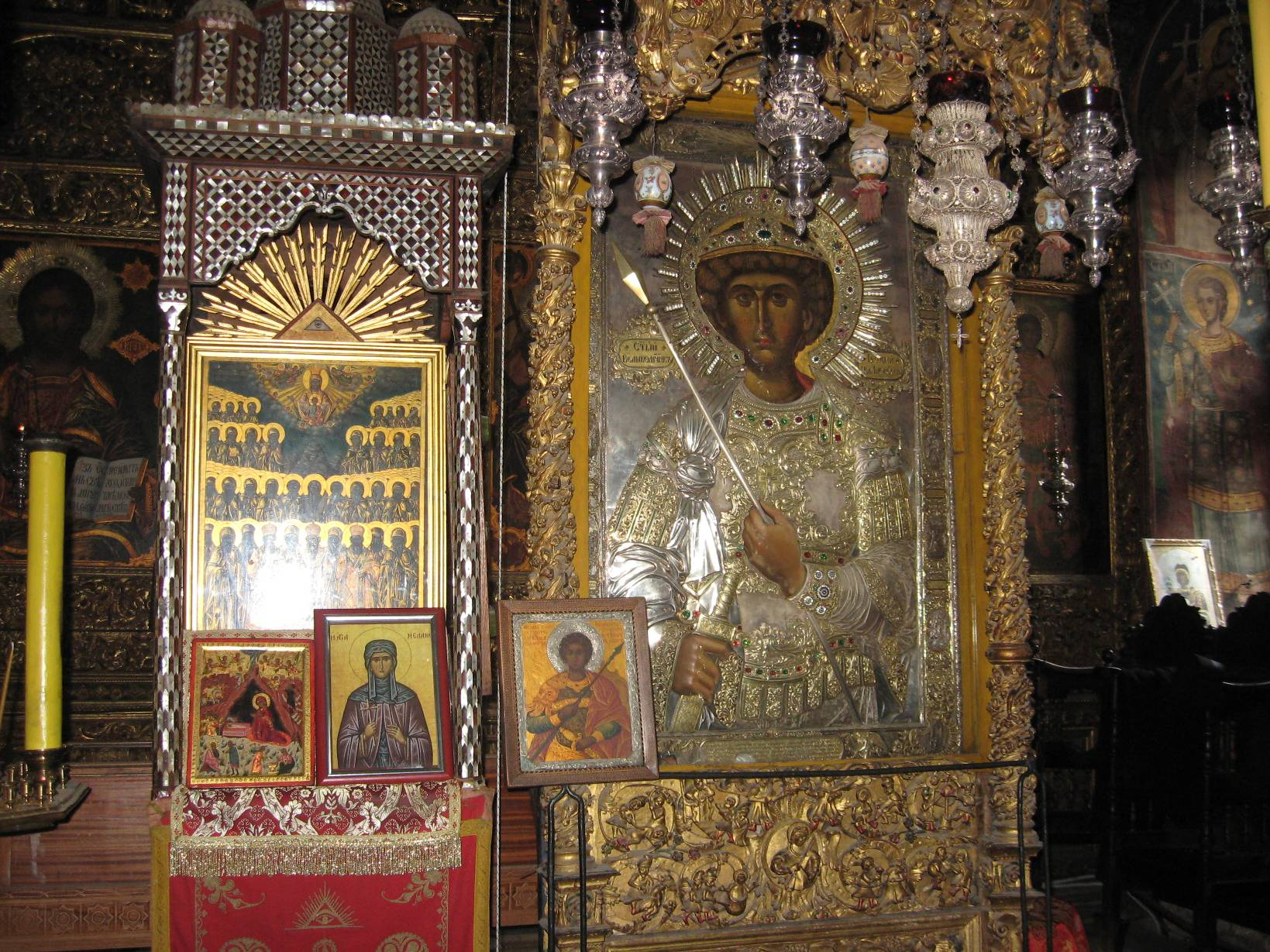
Interior view

Among the numerous relics and other holy objects treasured at the monastery is the Wonderworking Icon of the Theotokos "Of the Akathist," the feast day of which is celebrated on October 10. Since Mount Athos uses the traditional Julian Calendar, the day they celebrate as October 10 currently falls on October 23 of the modern Gregorian Calendar. Today the Monastery has 15 monks.

== Library ==
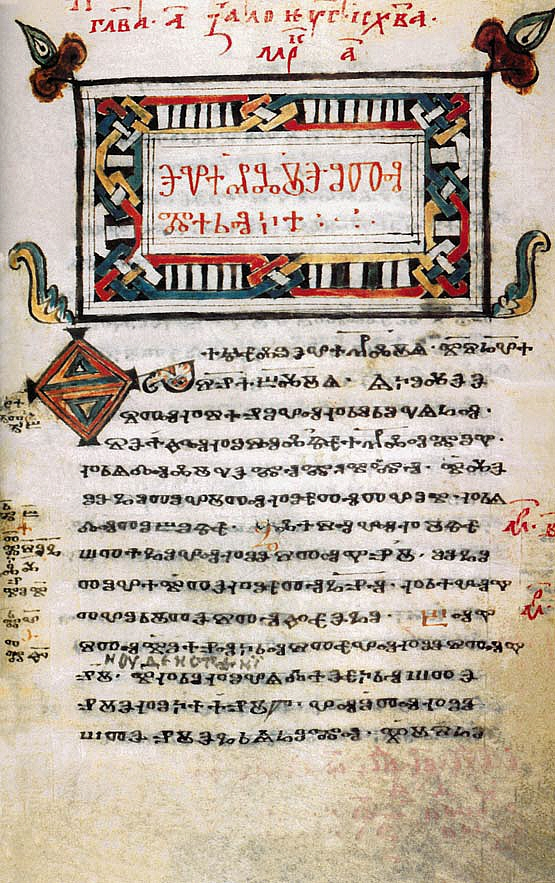
Page from the Codex Zographensis

The Zograf Monastery houses a library of major significance to Bulgarian culture, preserving medieval manuscripts such as a 15th-century copy of the passional of Saint Naum of Ohrid, the 14th-century passional of Saint Paraskevi, the original draft of Paisius of Hilendar's Istoriya Slavyanobolgarskaya, and the History of Zograf. The monastic library contains 388 manuscripts in Church Slavonic and 126 in Greek, as well as about 10,000 printed books altogether. Two medieval Bulgarian royal charters, the Zograf Charter and the Rila Charter, were discovered in the monastery's library.

== Honours ==
Zograf Peak on Livingston Island in the South Shetland Islands, Antarctica is named after the Zograf Monastery.

The monastery and its seal are depicted on the obverse of the Bulgarian 2 levs banknote, issued in 1999 and 2005.

On March 21, 2011, the Bulgarian National Bank issued a commemorative silver coin with nominal value of 10 levs featuring the monastery.

== Gallery ==
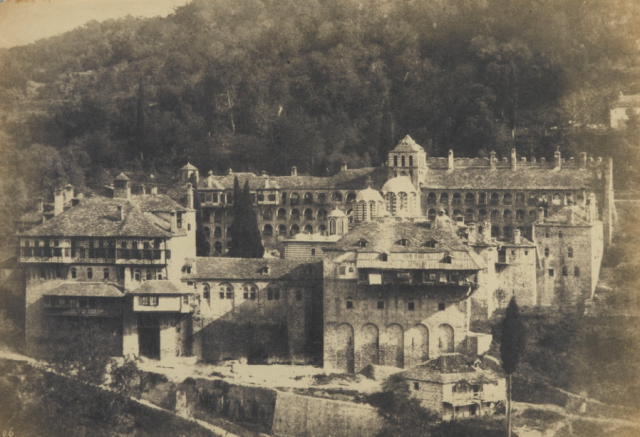
Photo of 1853

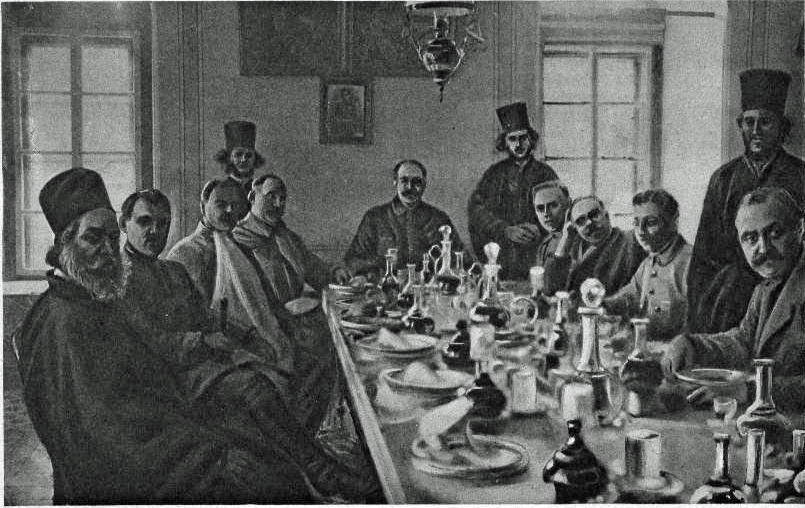
French mission in the monastery, 1917, during WWI

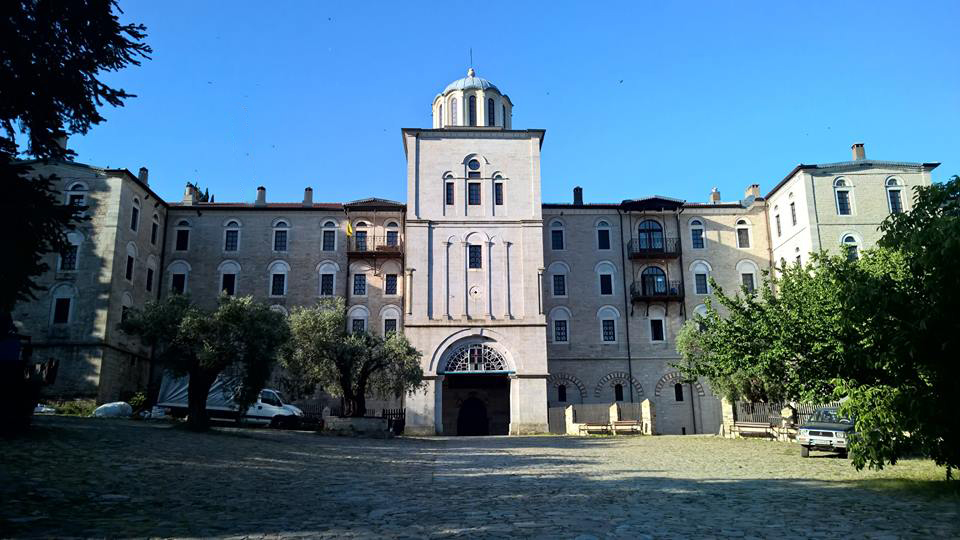
Main entrance

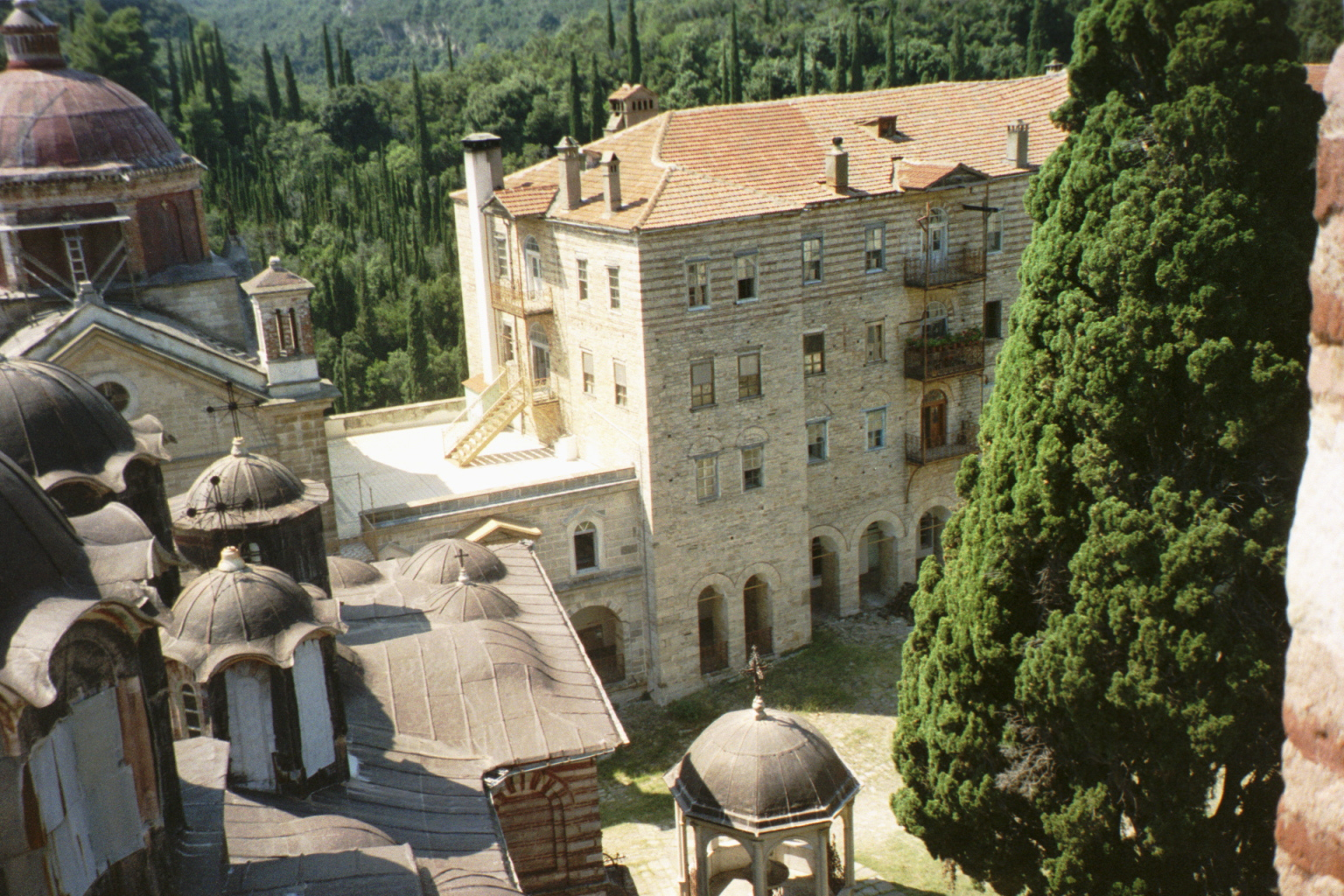
View from the bell tower

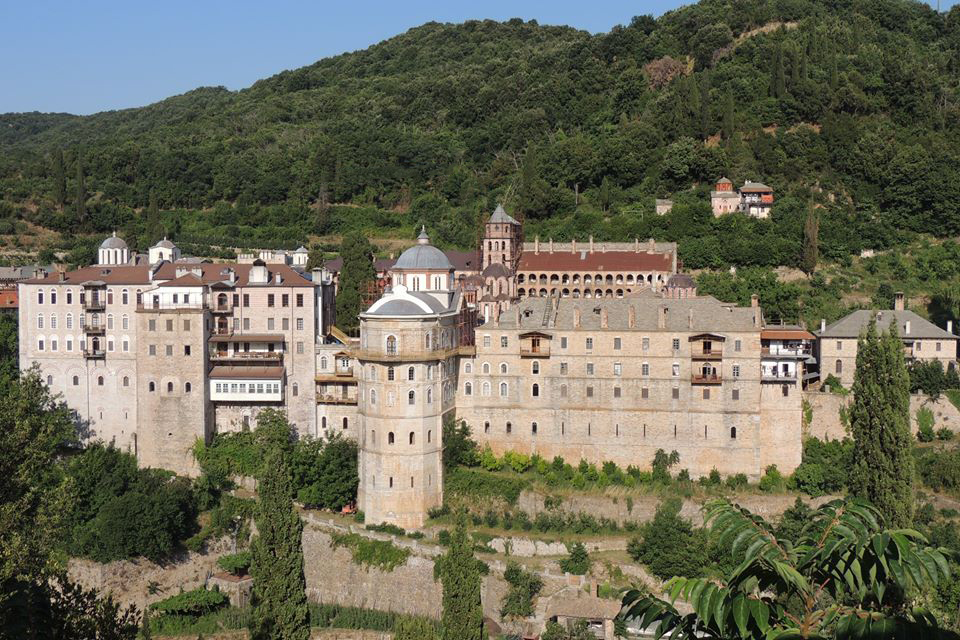
Exterior view

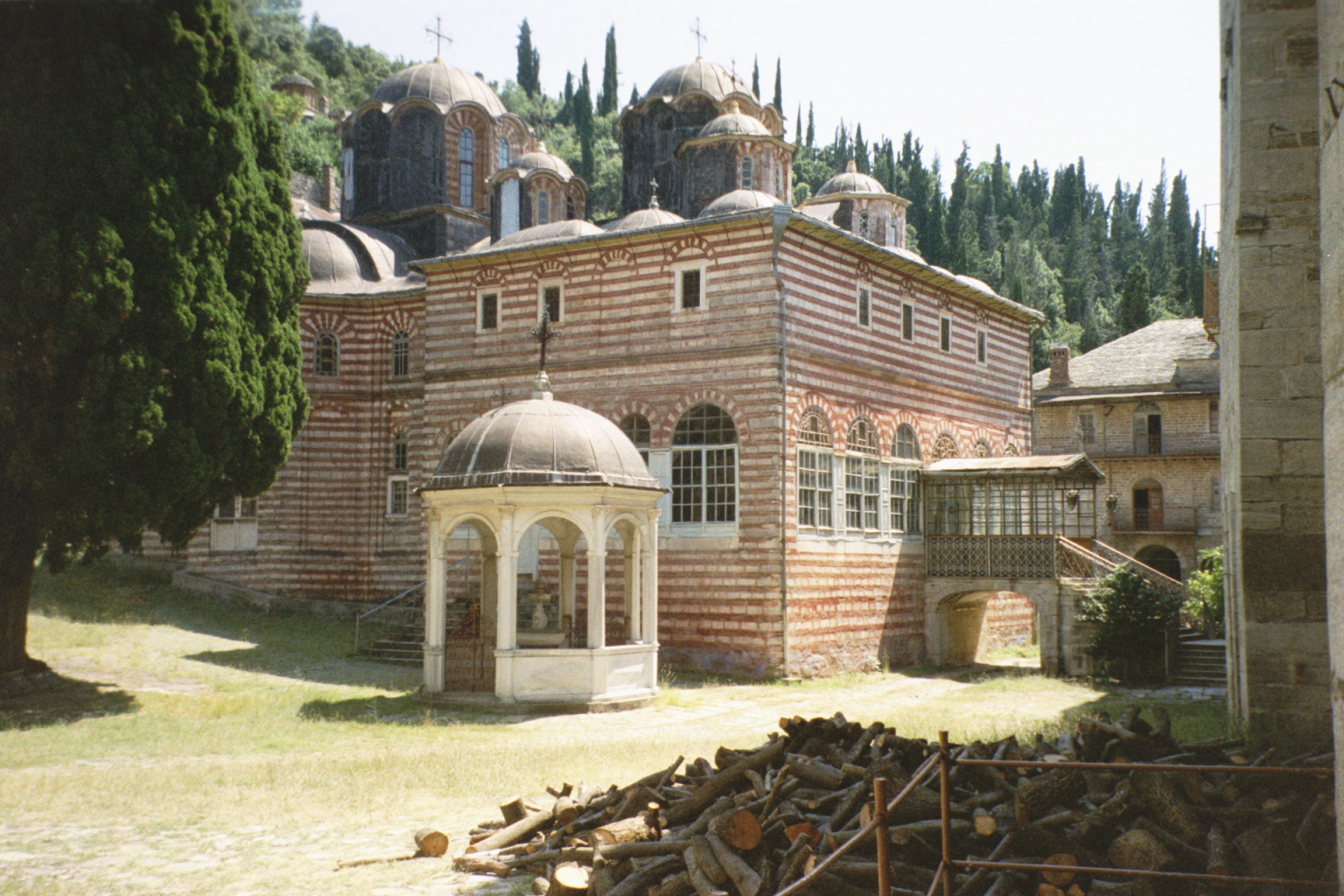
The inner court

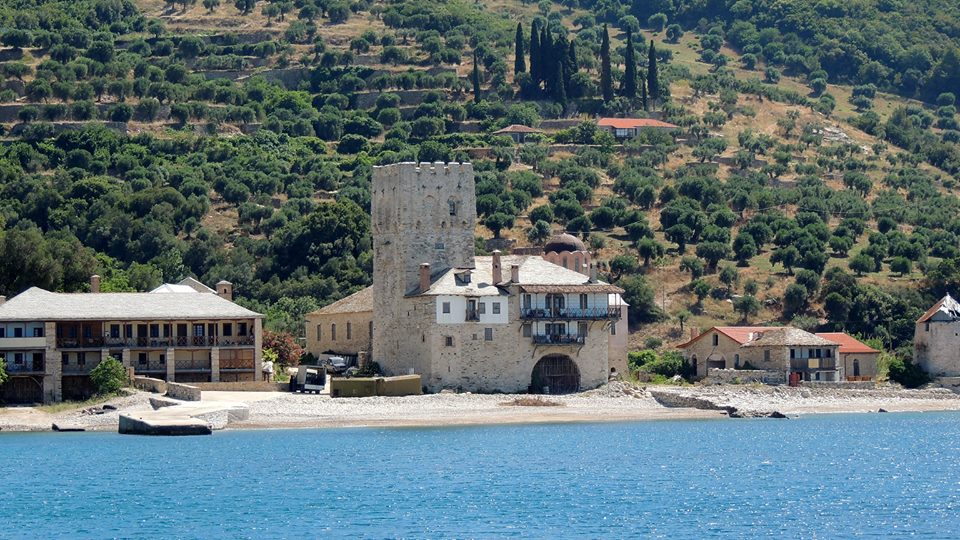
The anchorage of the monastery

== See also ==
- Bulgarian Orthodox Church
- List of monasteries in Greece
