= Istoriya Slavyanobolgarskaya =

1762 book by Paisius of Hilendar

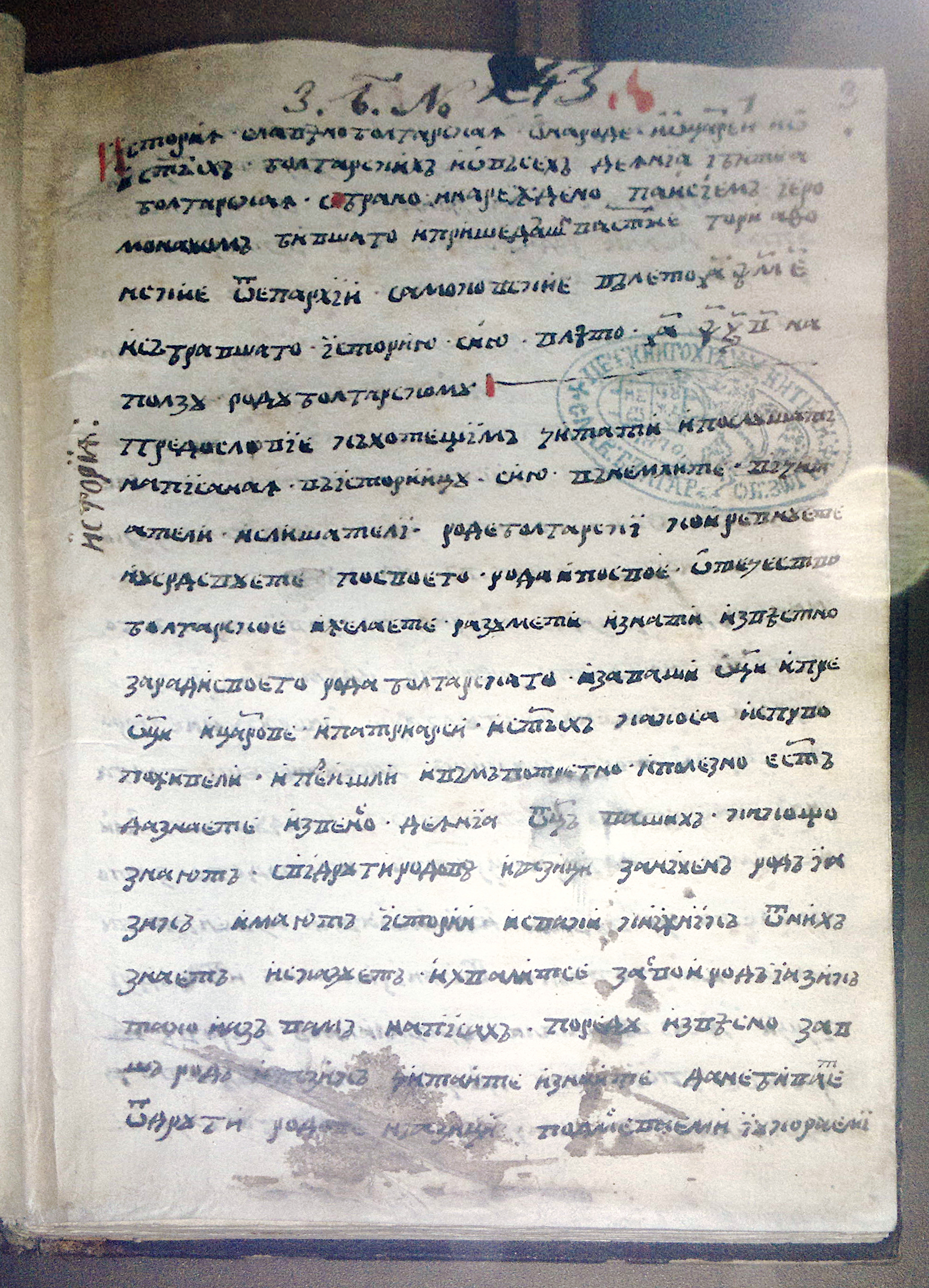
- The first page of the original draft by Paisius
- Author: Paisius of Hilendar
- Original title: Исторїѧ славѣноболгарскаѧ
- Language: Church Slavonic
- Genre: Historiography
- Publication date: 1762
- Publication place: Ottoman Empire

Istoriya Slavyanobolgarskaya (Original Cyrillic: Истори́ѧ славѣноболгарскаѧ corrected from Їстори́ѧ славѣноболгарскаѧ; Bulgarian: История славянобългарска, romanized: Istoriya slavyanobalgarska, lit. 'Slav-Bulgarian History') (Note: The full title of the book is A Slavonic–Bulgarian History of the Peoples, Tsars, Saints, and of all their Deeds and of the Bulgarian Way of Life. In English, the book has been also rendered as Slavonic-Bulgarian History, History of the Slavic Bulgarians, and History of the Bulgarian Slavs.) is a book by Bulgarian clergyman Paisius of Hilendar. Published in 1762, the book marked the beginning of the Bulgarian Revival.

Although he was based in the Serbian Orthodox monastery Hilandar, which was inhabited then mostly by Bulgarian monks, Paisius travelled extensively throughout the Ottoman Empire and abroad, and collected sources to compile and write his version of Bulgarian history.

== History ==
In 1758, he travelled to the monastery of Sremski Karlovci, where he sought historical sources about Bulgarian history, necessary for the making of his book. Among the sources he consulted were the Russian translation of Caesar Baronius' Annales Ecclesiastici and Mavro Orbini's Kingdom of the Slavs. He also gained access to monastic registers, chronicles, marginal notes in psalters, and royal charters of donation issued by Bulgarian kings, as well as the works of Euthymius I of Constantinople and the works about Bulgarian saints, all preserved within monastic libraries. In 1761, Paisius returned to the Hilandar Monastery and began intensively working on his manuscript. However, due to disagreements with the other monks, he was compelled to leave and relocate to the Zograf Monastery, where, in 1762, he completed his book. Paisius personally distributed his manuscript around the Bulgarian-inhabited lands. It is the only literary work by Paisius.

== Content ==
Structurally, Istoriya Slavyanobolgarskaya consists of an introduction, a preface, seven chapters, and an autobiographical epilogue. The preface is adapted from the Baronius' work and addresses the value of history. In the narrative, Paisius traced the history of the medieval Bulgarian state, highlighting the battles from Bulgaria's past and the struggle against the Byzantine Empire, concluding with the country's fall under Ottoman rule. An entire chapter is dedicated to the brothers Cyril and Methodius and the creation of the Glagolitic script.

The aim of the book was to awaken and strengthen Bulgarian national consciousness. Thus, Paisius wrote:

Oh, you unwise moron! Why are you ashamed to call yourself a Bulgarian and why don’t you read and speak in your native language? Weren’t Bulgarians powerful and glorious once? Didn’t they take taxes from strong Romans and wise Greeks? Out of all the Slavic nations they were the bravest one. Our rulers were the first ones to call themselves kings, the first ones to have patriarchs, the first ones to baptize their people. […] Why are you ashamed of your great history and your great language and why do you leave it to turn yourselves into Greeks? Why do you think they are any better than you? Well, here you are right, because did you see a Greek leave his country and ancestry as you do?

Paisius advocated against Hellenisation. In his focus on origins, he regarded the Bulgarians as descendants of Meshech.

In the book, he inserted negative stereotypes about Greeks, depicting them as "educated and polished, but haughty and arrogant, cunning, deceitful, dishonest and avaricious", contrasting them with the "honest and reliable, generous and hospitable Bulgarians". For him, the Bulgarians' main enemies during the Middle Ages were the "Greeks", i.e. the Byzantines. His primary aim was to discredit Greek views that the Bulgarians had always been people subjugated to the Greeks, to prove that they had had their own state, church and high culture, and to show that the Byzantine military power and the brilliance of Byzantine culture were false. He depicted the "Greek emperors" as deceitful and ruthless. Paisius referred to a "Greek yoke" over the Bulgarians. He also blamed the Greeks for the Ottoman conquest. Paisius did not distinguish between the Byzantines and the modern Greeks, referring to the "Eastern Greek Empire", "Greek emperors" and "Greek land" when writing about the Byzantine Empire. Paisius used "Greek" as a synonym for "Byzantine", but he gave it an ethnic meaning which it originally lacked. Paisius considered the Greeks, the Ecumenical Patriarchs and Greek culture as the most dangerous for Bulgarians. He glorified the medieval Bulgarian kings and people, while calling for the oppression from Ottoman authorities and the domination by Greek religions authorities to be lifted. Despite his pro-Bulgarian stance, Paisius blamed Bulgarians and Greeks equally for their disagreements. Paisius also regarded the Bulgarians as superior over the Serbs, for having killed many Serbian kings and making people pay tribute. Paisius regarded the Turks as invaders and oppressors, liable for the destruction of the achievements of the Bulgarian medieval state. He was the first author to refer to the Ottoman rule as "yoke" and "slavery".

== Legacy ==
The book marked the beginning of the Bulgarian National Revival. Its first transcribed copy was done by Sophronius of Vratsa in 1765 after a plea by Paisius. The second transcript was made by Aleksi Popovich in 1771. In 1772, the monk Nikifor Rilski made a transcript based on Popovich's copy. In 1774, teacher Doyno Gramatik transcribed and supplemented the book. In total, there are 60 known transcribed copies of the book. No printed form of the book existed until 1844, when it appeared in Hristaki Pavlovich's publication Tsarstvenik ("Book of Tsars"), which was used in Bulgarian schools in the 19th century. The book did not become popular until after the mid-19th century.

The original manuscript has been stored at the Bulgarian Orthodox Zograf Monastery in Mount Athos, Greece. As part of an operation codenamed "Marathon", the Bulgarian Committee for State Security stole the manuscript in the 1980s and replaced it with a copy, and secretly transferred it to Bulgaria. The theft was revealed in the 1990s, which caused a scandal in Bulgaria. In 1997, president Petar Stoyanov and the Ministry of Culture decided that the manuscript should be returned to the monastery. On 12 January 1998, it was returned.

The Zografou draft of the Istoriya Slavyanobolgarskaya was depicted on the reverse of the Bulgarian 2 levs banknote, issued in 1999 and 2005. An English version of the book appeared in the 2000s. The book has been also translated into French and Ukrainian.

Per historian Richard Frucht:

Typical of many works in the revivals of the various nationalities in Southeastern Europe, the tome is as much polemical as it is factual. Filled with errors that are often self-serving, the short book, written in Old Bulgarian (or Old Church Slavonic) glorified everything Bulgarian, while blaming others, notably the Byzantines, for the travails faced by the people. It was Constantinople, for example, that failed to defend the West from the Turkish onslaught. Paisii's emotionally charged anti-Greek bias (he was especially critical of the Hellenization of the church) was a critical step, both in creating the beginnings of a national identity and in inspiring the reemergence of the Bulgarian Orthodox Church in the nineteenth century.

According to historian Raymond Detrez, Paisius' overview of Bulgarian history has "little scientific value". Literary scholar Nikolay Aretov considers his narrative as national or proto-national (mythological). Per Aretov, Paisius "did not invent events but charged historical or pseudo-historical events, personalities, and plots with a general mythical meaning and thus sought to create a feeling of commonality and ethnic integration". Historian Roumen Daskalov regards the book as part of the Romantic (pre-scientific) historiography.

== See also ==
- De antiquitate Paterni soli et de rebus Bulgaricis
- Istoriya vo krattse o bolgarskom narode slovenskom
