= List of towns and villages in Montana Province =

This is a list of towns and villages in Montana Province, Bulgaria.

The place names in bold have the status of town (in Bulgarian: град, transliterated: grad) and the other localities have the status of village (in Bulgarian: село, transliterated: selo). These names use the Latin alphabet and link to the English Wikipedia article (where available); they are followed in parentheses by the original name in the Bulgarian Cyrillic alphabet which links to the Bulgarian Wikipedia article.

- Asparuhovo (Аспарухово)
- Balyuvitsa (Балювица)
- Barzia (Бързия)
- Beli Breg (Бели брег)
- Beli Brod (Бели брод)
- Belimel (Белимел)
- Belotintsi (Белотинци)
- **Berkovitsa** (Берковица)
- Bezdenitsa (Безденица)
- Bistrilitsa (Бистрилица)
- Blagovo (Благово)
- Bokilovtsi (Бокиловци)
- Borovtsi (Боровци)
- Botevo (Ботево)
- **Boychinovtsi** (Бойчиновци)
- **Brusartsi** (Брусарци)
- Bukovets (Буковец)
- Buzovets (Бъзовец)
- Chelyustnitsa (Челюстница)
- Chemish (Чемиш)
- Chereshovitsa (Черешовица)
- Cherkaski (Черкаски)
- Cherni Vrah (Черни връх)
- **Chiprovtsi** (Чипровци)
- Dabova mahala (Дъбова махала)
- Dalgi Del (Дълги дел)
- Dalgodeltsi (Дългоделци)
- Diva Slatina (Дива Слатина)
- Dobri dol (Добри дол)
- Doktor Yosifovo (Доктор Йосифово)
- Dolna Bela Rechka (Долна Бела речка)
- Dolna Riksa (Долна Рикса)
- Dolna Verenitsa (Долна Вереница)
- Dolni Tsibar (Долни Цибър)
- Dolno Belotintsi (Долно Белотинци)
- Dolno Linevo (Долно Линево)
- Dolno Ozirovo (Долно Озирово)
- Dolno Tserovene (Долно Церовене)
- Dondukovo (Дондуково)
- Draganitsa (Драганица)
- Elovitsa (Еловица)
- Erden (Ерден)
- Gabrovnitsa (Габровница)
- Gaganitsa (Гаганица)
- Gavril Genovo (Гаврил Геново)
- Georgi Damyanovo (Георги Дамяново)
- Glavanovtsi (Главановци)
- Gorna Bela Rechka (Горна Бела речка)
- Gorna Kovachitsa (Горна Ковачица)
- Gorna Luka (Горна Лука)
- Gorna Verenitsa (Горна Вереница)
- Gorni Tsibar (Горни Цибър)
- Gorno Ozirovo (Горно Озирово)
- Gorno Tserovene (Горно Церовене)
- Govezhda (Говежда)
- Gromshin (Громшин)
- Ignatovo (Игнатово)
- Kamenna Riksa (Каменна Рикса)
- Kiselevo (Киселево)
- Klisuritsa (Клисурица)
- Knyazheva mahala (Княжева махала)
- Kobilyak (Кобиляк)
- Komarevo (Комарево)
- Komoshtitsa (Комощица)
- Kopilovtsi (Копиловци)
- Kostentsi (Костенци)
- Kotenovtsi (Котеновци)
- Kovachitsa (Ковачица)
- Krapchene (Крапчене)
- Kriva bara (Крива бара)
- Lehchevo (Лехчево)
- Leskovets (Лесковец)
- Lipen (Липен)
- **Lom** (Лом)
- Madan (Мадан)
- Marchevo (Мърчево)
- Martinovo (Мартиново)
- Medkovets (Медковец)
- Melyane (Меляне)
- Mezdreya (Мездрея)
- Mitrovtsi (Митровци)
- Mokresh (Мокреш)
- **Montana** (Монтана)
- Nikolovo (Николово)
- Odorovtsi (Одоровци)
- Ohrid (Охрид)
- Orsoya (Орсоя)
- Palilula (Палилула)
- Parlichevo (Пърличево)
- Pesochnitsa (Песочница)
- Pishurka (Пишурка)
- Pomezhdin (Помеждин)
- Portitovtsi (Портитовци)
- Prevala (Превала)
- Rashovitsa (Рашовица)
- Rasovo (Расово)
- Ravna (Равна)
- Razgrad (Разград)
- Septemvriytsi (Септемврийци)
- Slatina (Слатина)
- Slavotin (Славотин)
- Slivata (Сливата)
- Slivovik (Сливовик)
- Smirnenski (Смирненски)
- Smolyanovtsi (Смоляновци)
- Spanchevtsi (Спанчевци)
- Staliyska mahala (Сталийска махала)
- Stanevo (Станево)
- Stoyanovo (Стояново)
- Stubel (Стубел)
- Studeno buche (Студено буче)
- Sumer (Сумер)
- Traykovo (Трайково)
- Trifonovo (Трифоново)
- Tsvetkova bara (Цветкова бара)
- **Valchedram** (Вълчедръм)
- **Varshets** (Вършец)
- Vasilovtsi (Василовци)
- Vidlitsa (Видлица)
- Vinishte (Винище)
- Virove (Вирове)
- Vladimirovo (Владимирово)
- Voynitsi (Войници)
- Yagodovo (Ягодово)
- Yakimovo (Якимово)
- Zamfir (Замфир)
- Zamfirovo (Замфирово)
- Zhelezna (Железна)
- Zlatiya (Златия)

== See also ==
- Provinces of Bulgaria
- Municipalities of Bulgaria
- List of cities and towns in Bulgaria
- List of villages in Bulgaria
- Romanization of Bulgarian
