= Vidin–Botevgrad expressway =

Road in Bulgaria

- Скоростен път "Видин–Ботевград"
- Vidin–Botevgrad expressway highlighted

Route information
- Length: 201.9 km (125.5 mi) 57.1 km (35.5 mi) in service 60.0 km (37.3 mi) under construction 84.8 km (52.7 mi) planned

Major junctions
- From: Vidin, New Europe Bridge, E79; (Romania)
- To: Botevgrad, E79,

Location
- Country: Bulgaria
- Major cities: Montana, Vratsa, Mezdra

Highway system
- Highways in Bulgaria

The Vidin–Botevgrad expressway (Bulgarian: Скоростен път „Видин–Ботевград“, romanized: Skorosten pat "Vidin–Botevgrad") is a partly existing, partly under construction and almost halfway planned expressway in Bulgaria, that will link the New Europe Bridge at the Danube border crossing to Romania near Vidin with the A2 Hemus motorway Sofia–Varna after completion. The expressway provides grade-separated dual carriageway with two lanes in each direction and it replaces or supersedes the existing I-1 road.

The route is part of the Pan-European Corridor IV. It is also part of the European route E79, that runs from Miskolc (Hungary) to Thessaloniki (Greece) and part of the proposed Via Carpatia route.

== History ==
In June 2014, tenders for construction of two sections between Botevgrad and Mezdra were announced. In September 2014, the Road Infrastructure Agency announced that construction of Vidin–Botevgrad expressway shall be financed by an EIB loan.

In the end of December 2015, the bypass of Montana was inaugurated, followed by the bypass of Vratsa, initially with only two lanes on one carriageway.

On April 13, 2023, 7.5 kilometers along the settlements of Novachene and Skravena in the section Lyutidol-Botevgrad were put into operation. On March 5, 2024 the section Makresh to Bela was opened. End of 2025, the section Mezdra-Lyutidol was set under traffic.

== Sections of the expressway ==
Section	km	Destinations	Notes
0	2.9	New Europe Bridge - Vidin	In service
1	29.6	Vidin - Makresh	Under construction
2.1	13.6	Makresh - Bela	In service
2.2	11.1	Bela - Ruzhintsi	Under construction
2.3	41.1	Ruzhintsi - Montana	Tender
2.4	12.5	Montana By-Pass	In service
3.1	28.7	Montana - Vratsa	Planned
3.2	15.0	Vratsa By-Pass	Planned
3.3	9.0	Vratsa - Mezdra	In service
4.1	13.4	Mezdra - Lyutidol	In service
4.2	19.3	Lyutidol - Botevgrad	Under construction
	5.7	Botevgrad By-Pass	In service

== Junction list ==
Oblast (Province)	Location	Name	km	Destinations	Status	Notes
Vidin	Vidin	New Europe Bridge	0.0	Craiova	In service	Northern terminus
Vidin	Vidin	Novo selo	2.9	Vidin, Koshava	In service	
Vidin	Vidin	Bregovo	6.1	Vidin, Bregovo	Under Construction	One carriageway operational
Vidin	Vidin	Ruptsi	7.6		Under Construction	One carriageway operational, the junction will be abandoned after the expansion.
Vidin	Vidin	Novoseltsi	8.5	Vidin, Vrashka chuka	Under Construction	One carriageway operational
Vidin	Vidin	Vidin	9.7	Vidin-Southern Industrial Area	Under Construction	One carriageway operational
Vidin	Vidin	Dunavtsi	20.1	Dunavtsi, Sinagovtsi	Under Construction	
Vidin	Kula	Kula	30.2	Kula, Sratsimirovo	Under Construction	
Vidin	Kula	Vidin	33.9		In service	Temporary exit until opening of section to exit Kula
Vidin	Makresh	Makresh	36.1	Makresh, Dimovo	In service	
Vidin	Dimovo	Bela	46.4	Bela, Dimovo	In service	
Vidin	Ruzhintsi	Ruzhintsi	58.6	Medovnitsa, Ruzhintsi	Under Construction	
Montana	Montana	Belotintsi	73.1	Belotintsi	Under Construction	
Montana	Montana	Vinishte	85.2	Smolyanovtsi, Vinishte	Tender	
Montana	Montana	Montana	98.4	Dolna Verenitsa, Montana	Tender	
Montana	Montana	Archar	103.0	Archar, Montana	In service	Emergency lanes planned
Montana	Montana	Lom	104.6	Sofia, Lom	In service	Emergency lanes planned
Montana	Montana	Montana	108.6	Montana, Petrohan Pass	In service	Emergency lanes planned
Montana	Montana	Nikolovo		Nikolovo	Planned	
Montana	Montana	Krapchene	113.1	Krapchene, Dolni Dabnik	Planned	
Montana	Montana	Sumer	119 (Note: Kilometers from Sumer to Botevgrad are not precise, because detailed route planning Krapchene-Vratsa North has not been finalized yet.)	Sumer	Planned	
Vratsa	Krivodol	Kravoder	125	Kravoder, Glavatsi	Planned	
Vratsa	Vratsa	Vratsa	143	Vratsa	Planned	One carriageway operational
Vratsa	Vratsa	Nephela	145	Nephela, Vratsa	Planned	One carriageway operational
Vratsa	Vratsa	Krivodol	147	Krivodol, Vratsa	Planned	One carriageway operational
Vratsa	Vratsa	Oryahovo	149	Oryahovo, Vratsa	Planned	One carriageway operational
Vratsa	Vratsa	Vratsa	158	Vratsa	Planned	One carriageway operational
Vratsa	Mezdra	Ruska Bela	159	Ruska Bela	In service	Emergency lanes planned
Vratsa	Mezdra	Moravitsa	161	Moravitsa	In service	Emergency lanes planned
Vratsa	Mezdra	Mezdra	165	Mezdra, Brestnitsa	In service	
Vratsa	Mezdra	Durmantsi	167	Durmantsi	In service	
Vratsa	Mezdra	Rebarkovo	170	Rebarkovo, Novi Iskar	In service	
Vratsa	Mezdra		176	(490 m)	In service	
Vratsa	Mezdra		176	(340 m)	In service	
Vratsa	Mezdra	Lyutidol	177	Lyutidol	In service	
Sofia	Botevgrad	Novachene	187	Novachene	Under construction	Partly operational
Sofia	Botevgrad	Botevgrad	195	Skrawena, Botevgrad	Under construction	
Sofia	Botevgrad	Novachene	199	Botevgrad, Trudovets, Pleven	In service	
Sofia	Botevgrad	Hemus	202	Sofia, Varna	In service	Southern terminus
