= Tsibar =

Location
- Country: Bulgaria

Physical characteristics
- Source
  - location: Shiroka Planina, Pre-Balkan
  - coordinates: 43°28′41.88″N 22°55′14.88″E
  - elevation: 816 m (2,677 ft)
- Mouth
  - location: Tsibritsa
  - coordinates: 43°34′26.04″N 23°12′50.04″E
  - elevation: 145 m (476 ft)
- Length: 30 km (19 mi)
- Basin size: 138 km^{2} (53 sq mi)

Basin features
- Progression: Tsibritsa→ Danube

The Tsibar (Bulgarian: Цибър) is a river in northwestern Bulgaria, a left tributary of the Tsibritsa, itself a right tributary of the Danube. Its length is 30 km, making it the second longest tributary of the Tsibritsa.

The river takes its source at an altitude of 816 m in the Vlashko Pole locality on the northern slopes of the Shiroka Planina division of the Pre-Balkan range, a system of low-lying mountains and hills between the Balkan Mountains and the Danubian Plain. It flows in general direction northeast. The river runs in a deep forested valley until the village of Dolna Riksa. Downstream, it enters the Danubian Plain and the valley widens, surrounded by farmland. It flows into the Tsibritsa at an altitude of 145 m some 3 km north the village of Bezdenitsa.

Its drainage basin covers a territory of 138 km^{2}, or 14.8% of the Tsibritsa's total. It dries out in the lower course in summer.

The Tsibar flows entirely in Montana Province. There are two village along its course, Dolna Riksa and Slavotin, both in Montana Municipality. Its waters are utilised for irrigation.
