= Nikolovo =

Nikolovo may refer to:

- In Bulgaria (written in Cyrillic as Николово):
  - Nikolovo, Haskovo Province - a village in Haskovo municipality, Haskovo Province
  - Nikolovo, Montana Province - a village in Montana municipality, Montana Province
  - Nikolovo, Ruse Province - a village in Rousse municipality, Ruse Province
