= Gorna Bela Rechka =

Gorna Bela Rechka Горна Бела речка
- Village
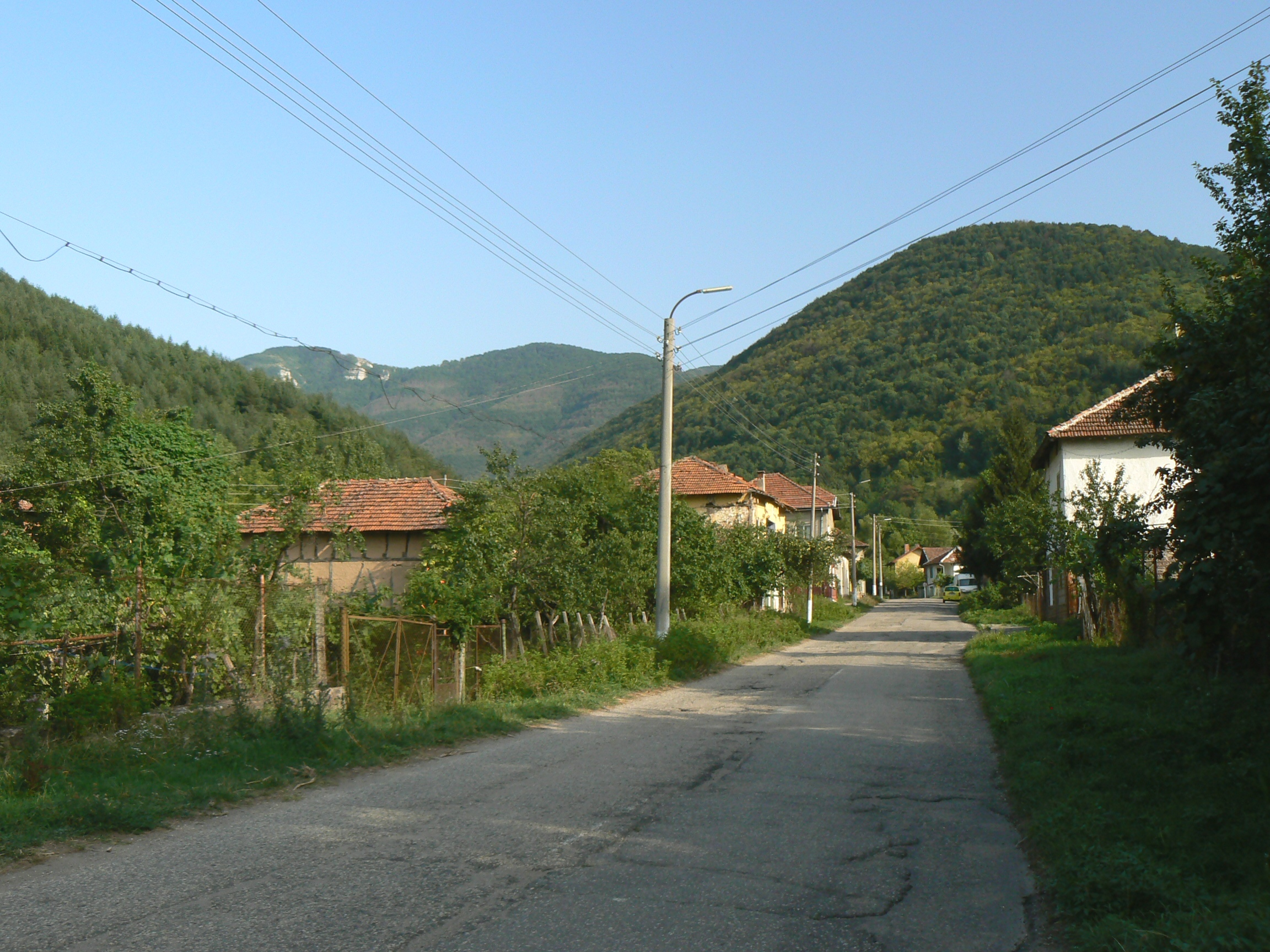

- Location in Bulgaria
- Coordinates: 43.1044161°N 23.2124011°E
- Country: Bulgaria
- Province: Montana Province
- Municipality: Varshets

Area
  - Total: 19,975 km^{2} (7,712 sq mi)
- Elevation: 300–499 m (984–1,637 ft)

Population (2013)
  - Total: 61
- Time zone: UTC+2 (EET)
  - Summer (DST): UTC+3 (EEST)
- Postal Code: 3544

Gorna Bela Rechka (Northwest of Bulgaria)

Gorna Bela Rechka (Bulgarian Горна Бела речка) is a small village in the northwestern region of Bulgaria, about 25 kilometers from the Serbian border. It belongs to the community of Varshets in the province of Montana. Nothing is known about its history. (Note: For more about the history of the region: see paragraph “Geschichte” (history) in the German article Montana (Bulgarien).) Montana, the provincial capital, is situated about 36 km to the northwest.

== Geography ==
=== Geographical Location ===
Gorna Bela Rechka can be reached from Montana by taking roads No. 1, 1621 and 162 to the southeast, passing Krapchene and then Trifonovo on the left, and later Sumer and Stoynovo. After having passed through Dolno Ozirovo the route becomes mountainous. Before reaching Varshets, turn to the left, initially reaching Dolna Bela Rechka and then, surrounded by woods, fields and mountains, Gorna Bela Rechka. After the village, road No. 162 leads through forests into the Oblast Sofia. The capital Sofia, slightly less than 80 km – 55 km as the crow flies – south of Gorna Bela Rechka, can be reached by bus and train via Lakatnik in just under two hours.

=== Climate ===
Montana Province has a climate with hot, dry summers and cold, snowy winters. The hottest month is usually August with a minimum temperature of 22 °C and a maximum of 29 °C. The coldest month is typically February with temperatures between 0 °C and -6 °C. Precipitation is generally low, lowest in March with one day and highest in January with 12 days of precipitation.

== Economy ==
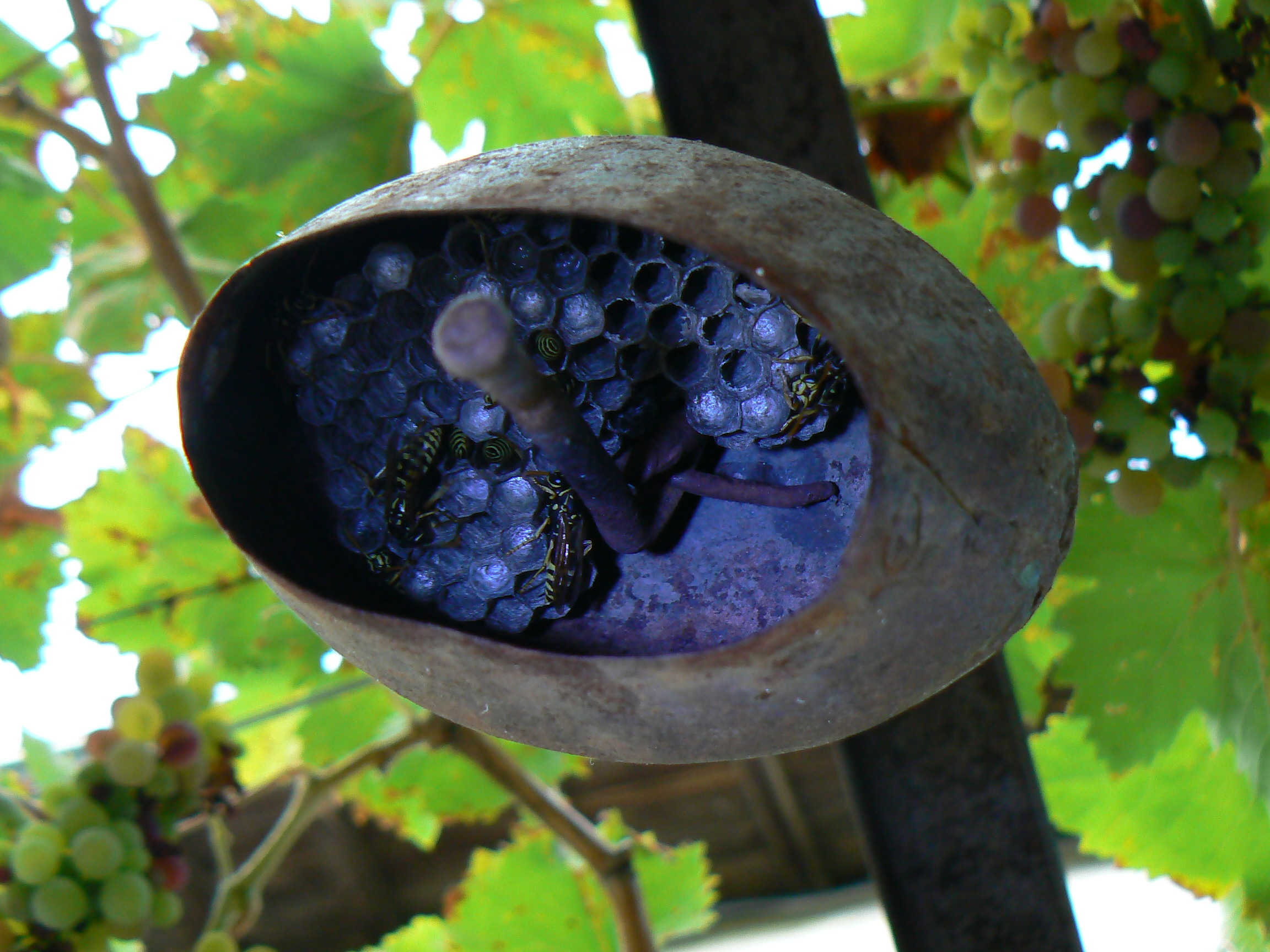
Wasp Nest In a Sheep Bell in Gorna Bela Rechka

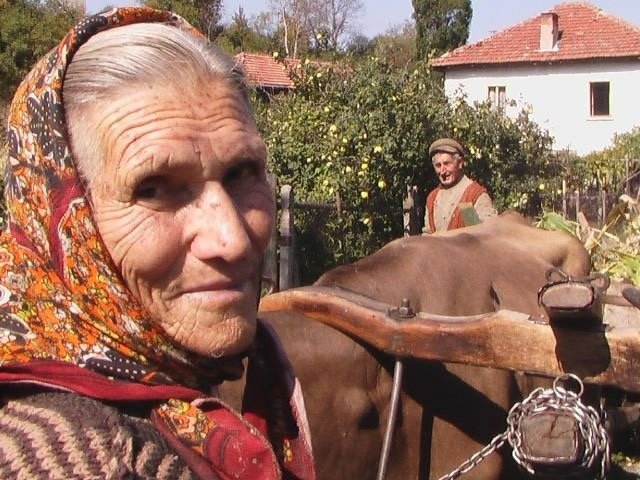
Residents With a Cow

Gorna Bela Rechka is located in a region that is considered “the poorest region in the EU”. The gross domestic product in northwestern Bulgaria is only 28% of the average in Europe. The whole region is impacted financially primarily by a “depopulation of rural areas”. The Montana Region alone has lost more than 50,000 inhabitants since the last millennium. This has led to solitude and an aging population. In 2013 only 61 residents were counted in Gorna Bela Rechka, all over the age of 70. In particular, many women have left their homes. They found employment caring for the elderly in other European countries, in order to support surviving relatives left at home in Bulgaria. In his 70-minute documentary The Town of Badante Women, film maker Stephan Komandarev has dealt with the impact of these economic and social tragedies, using the example of the women from nearby Varshets in 2009. Because there are no young people left in Gorna Bela Rechka, the situation in the village has changed. Here, people mainly live off their goats and sheep. From goat milk they produce traditional foods, including a special goat cheese. The products from Bela Rechka meet the criteria of Slow Food.

== Culture ==
In 2015 Francesco Martino wrote the following about the village: “Gorna Bela Rechka is no exception to the sad reality of this region - poor, desolate and sleepy”. After the collapse of a “centuries-old cultural and culinary tradition” the cultural life of the residents had been reduced to farming goats and sheep. Cultural events, as they are known elsewhere, were just as absent as a school or a church. That has changed in 2003. Since then, every year in May, the international Goatmilk Festival takes place, a lively cultural event, where locals and guests are involved and mingle. For that reason, Ger Duijzings considers the village not as a typical example of the region:

Yet Bela Rechka is perhaps not a typical case. It can be singled out because of its residents' heightened awareness of the urban-rural distinction and their conscious attempts at self-positioning within or across it, which is triggered by two factors: past rural-urban migration and the present opening up of the village to the world via the annual Goatmilk Memories Festival.

— Ger Duijzings,

=== Goatmilk Festival ===
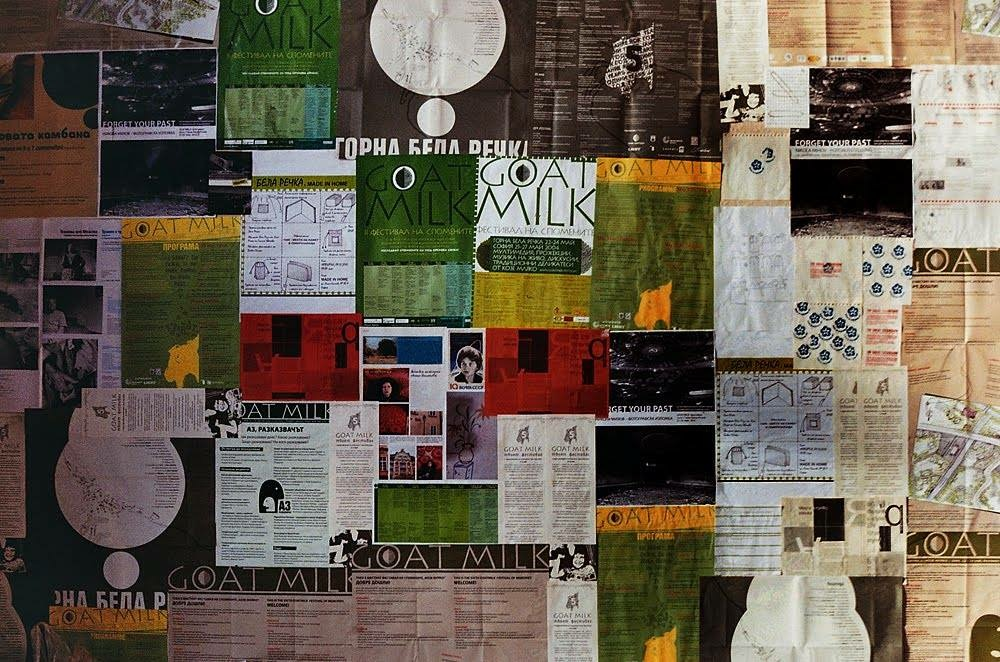
Goat Milk Festival Posters

The Goatmilk Festival originated in 2003 due to the initiative of the Bulgarian journalist Diana Ivanova. She curates it together with Mariana Assenova. Since then, it has grown into an international cultural festival which enjoys some popularity. There is a video documentary by Rayna Teneva. The festival takes place in May of each year and is always dedicated to a selected theme. In 2016 the festival was titled “Fear, let's talk about that”.

=== The Bell ===
In 2008, the Goatmilk festival was marked by the recreation of its bell. Although there is no church, Bela Rechka had a clock tower with a bell which had been important to the locals, perhaps because there was little else, and because the bell's ringing structured social life. In the 1990s the bell had been stolen. Artists from around the world wanted to help Bela Rechka get a new bell. With the help of the European program Culture 2000 and numerous sponsors, Bela Rechka finally got a new bell. This is testified in a video documentary of the Goethe Institute.
