= Blagovo =

Blagovo may refer to:

- In Bulgaria (written in Cyrillic as Благово):
  - Blagovo, Montana Province - a village in Montana municipality, Montana Province
  - Blagovo, Shumen Province - a village in Shumen municipality, Shumen Province
