= Yagodovo =

Yagodovo may refer to:

- Yagodovo, Montana Province - a village in Berkovitsa municipality, Montana Province, Bulgaria
- Yagodovo, Plovdiv Province - a village in Rodopi municipality, Plovdiv Province, Bulgaria
