= Varshets Municipality =

Varshets Municipality Община Вършец
- Municipality
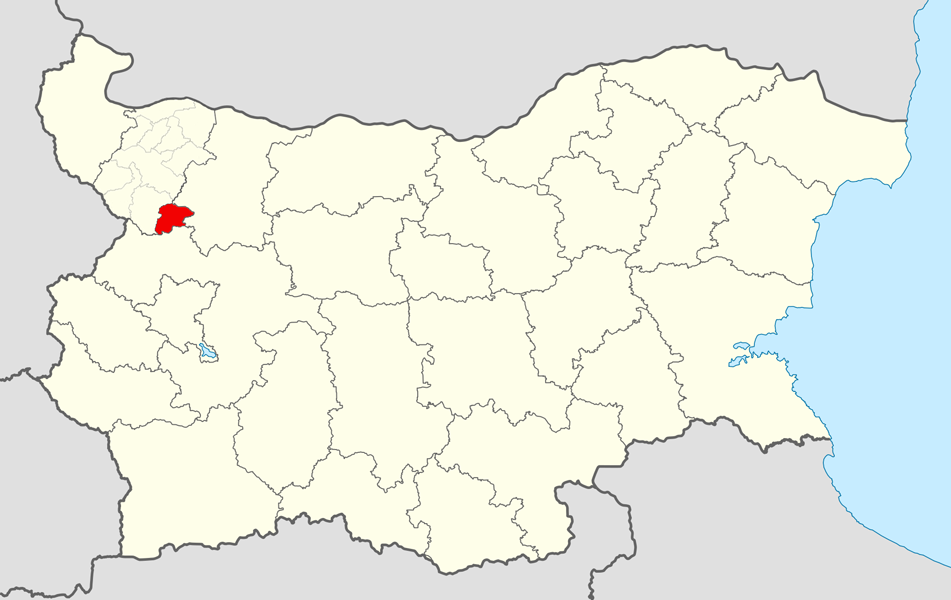
- Varshets Municipality within Bulgaria and Montana Province.
- Coordinates: 43°12′N 23°18′E
- Country: Bulgaria
- Province (Oblast): Montana
- Admin. centre (Obshtinski tsentar): Varshets

Area
  - Total: 240 km^{2} (93 sq mi)

Population (Census February 2011)
  - Total: 8,108
  - Density: 34/km^{2} (87/sq mi)
- Time zone: UTC+2 (EET)
  - Summer (DST): UTC+3 (EEST)

Varshets Municipality (Bulgarian: Община Вършец) is a municipality (obshtina) in Montana Province, Northwestern Bulgaria, located on the northern slopes of the western Stara planina mountain to the area of the so-called Fore-Balkan. It is named after its administrative centre - the town of Varshets.

The municipality embraces a territory of 240 km^{2} (93 sq mi) with a population of 8,108 inhabitants, as of February 2011.

Todorini Kukli peak, 1,785 m (5,856 ft), is located in the southwestern part of the area almost on the very border with Berkovitsa Municipality.

== Settlements ==
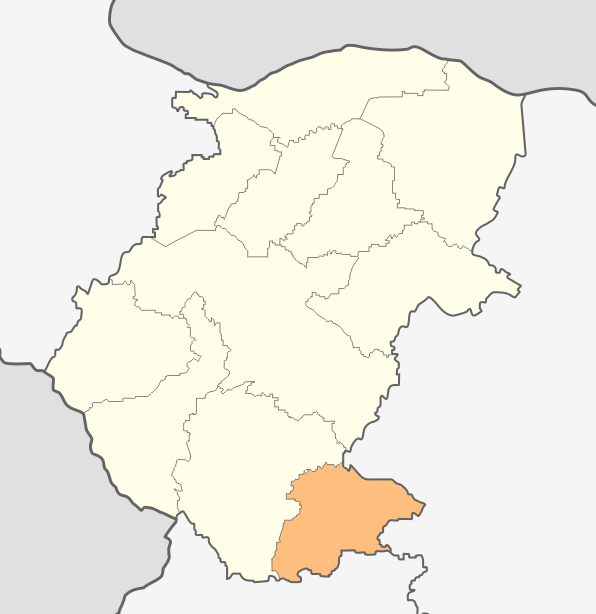
Varshets Municipality within Montana Province

Varshets Municipality includes the following 9 places (towns are shown in bold):

Town/Village	Cyrillic	Population (December 2009)
**Varshets**	**Вършец**	6,538
Cherkaski	Черкаски	316
Dolna Bela Rechka	Долна Бела речка	99
Dolno Ozirovo	Долно Озирово	477
Draganitsa	Драганица	260
Gorna Bela Rechka	Горна Бела речка	83
Gorno Ozirovo	Горно Озирово	382
Spanchevtsi	Спанчевци	367
Stoyanovo	Стояново	81
Total		8,605

== Demography ==
The following table shows the change of the population during the last four decades.

Varshets Municipality
**Year**	1975	1985	1992	**2001**	2005	2007	2009	**2011**
**Population**	12,119	11,453	11,062	9,870	9,031	8,860	8,605	8,108
Sources: Census 2001, Census 2011, „pop-stat.mashke.org“,

=== Religion ===
According to the latest Bulgarian census of 2011, the religious composition, among those who answered the optional question on religious identification, was the following:

Religious composition of Varshets Municipality
Orthodox Christianity	75.7%
Catholicism	0.4%
Protestantism	1.2%
Islam	0.0%
No religion	18.5%
Prefer not to answer, others and indefinable	4.2%

== See also ==
- Provinces of Bulgaria
- Municipalities of Bulgaria
- List of cities and towns in Bulgaria
