= Studeno buche =

Studeno buche Студено буче
- Village
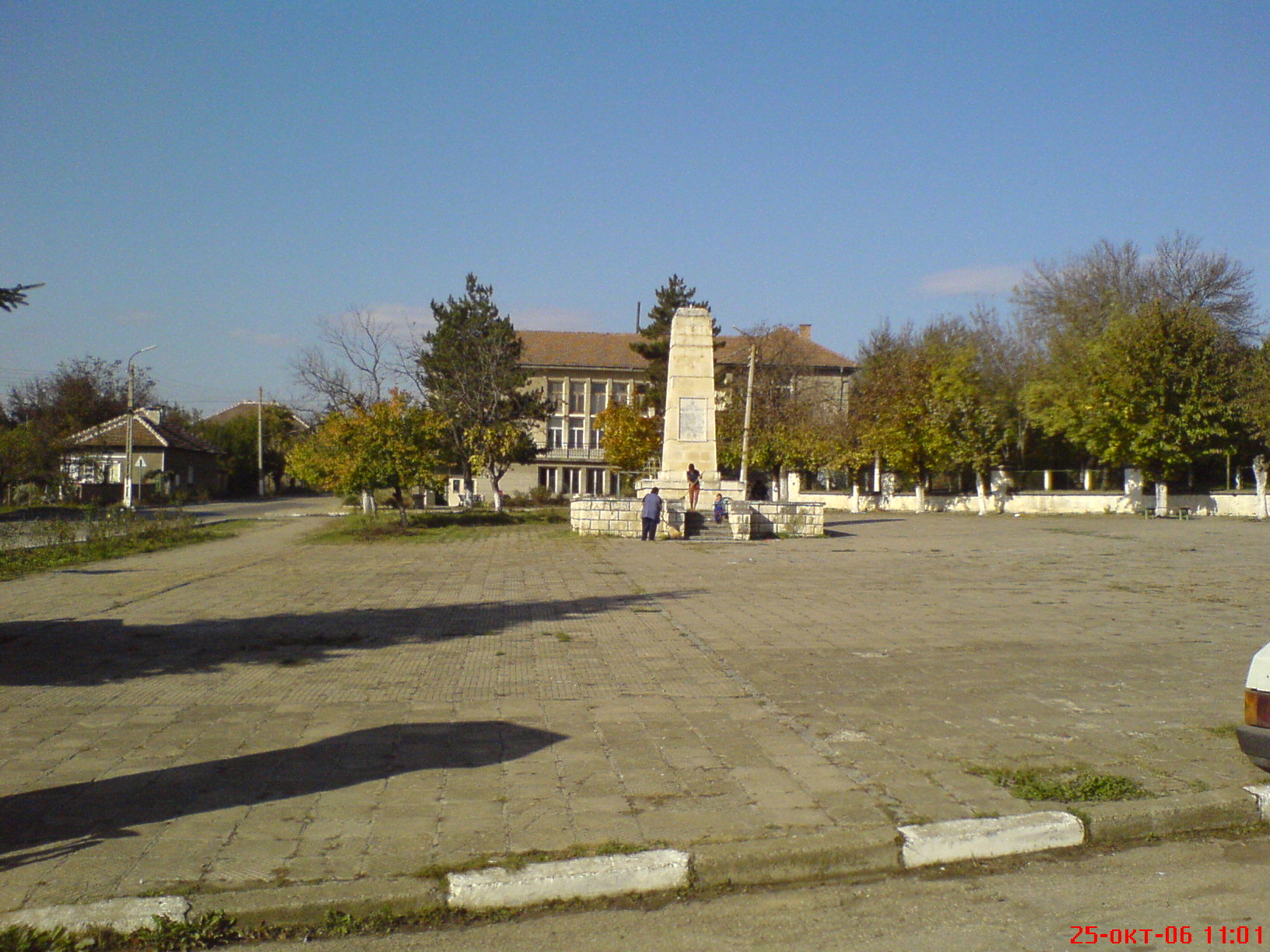
- Village centre

- Location within Bulgaria
- Coordinates: 43.4667°N 23.1833°E
- Country: Bulgaria
- Province: Montana Province
- Municipality: Montana
- Time zone: UTC+2 (EET)
  - Summer (DST): UTC+3 (EEST)

Studeno buche is a village in Montana Municipality, Montana Province, northwestern Bulgaria.
