= Stanevo =

Stanevo Станево
- Location of Stanevo
- Coordinates: 43°49′25″N 23°26′46″E
- Country: Bulgaria
- Province (Oblast): Montana

Government
  - Mayor: Plamen Mitkov
- Elevation: 36 m (118 ft)

Population (2009-03-15)
  - Total: 328
- Time zone: UTC+2 (EET)
  - Summer (DST): UTC+3 (EEST)
- Postal Code: 3641
- Area code: 09724

Stanevo (Bulgarian: Станево) is a village in Northwestern Bulgaria.

It is located in Lom Municipality, Montana Province.

== See also ==
- List of villages in Montana Province
