= Zamfir, Bulgaria =

Zamfir Замфир
- Location of Zamfir
- Coordinates: 43°46′56″N 23°14′43″E
- Country: Bulgaria
- Province (Oblast): Montana

Government
  - Mayor: Gavril Gavrilov
- Elevation: 140 m (460 ft)

Population (2011)
  - Total: 1,003
- Time zone: UTC+2 (EET)
  - Summer (DST): UTC+3 (EEST)
- Postal Code: 3644
- Area code: 09726

Zamfir (Bulgarian: Замфир) is a village in Northwestern Bulgaria. It is located in Lom Municipality, Montana Province.

== History ==
The village is named after Zamfir Hadzhiyski (1899 – 1943), a local communist and partisan. The old name of Zamfir was Dalgoshevtsi (Bulgarian: Дългошевци).

== Demographics ==
According to the 2011 Bulgarian census, 1006 people lived in the village. 96.3% (968) were Bulgarians, 2.2% (22) were Roma, and the rest were unknown. The population in 2024 was 833.

== See also ==
- List of villages in Montana Province
