= Mezdreya =

Village in northwestern Bulgaria

Coordinates: 43°14′34″N 023°11′11″E

Mezdreya (Bulgarian: Мездрея) is a village in northwestern Bulgaria, located in the Berkovitsa Municipality of the Montana Province.

== See also ==
- List of villages in Montana Province
