= Traykovo =

Traykovo Трайково
- Location of Traykovo
- Coordinates: 43°44′58″N 23°12′18″E
- Country: Bulgaria
- Province (Oblast): Montana

Government
  - Mayor: Rumen Radevski
- Elevation: 150 m (490 ft)

Population (2026)
  - Total: 583
- Time zone: UTC+2 (EET)
  - Summer (DST): UTC+3 (EEST)
- Postal Code: 3645
- Area code: 09723

Traykovo (Bulgarian: Трайково) is a village in Northwestern Bulgaria. It is located in Lom Municipality, Montana Province.

It is situated 10 km southwest of the town of Lom, 49 km north of Montana and about 150 km in the same direction from Sofia.

== See also ==
- List of villages in Montana Province Montana Montana Province Lom Bulgaria
