= Gorno Tserovene =

Gorno Tserovene Горно Церовене
- Village
- Location within Bulgaria
- Coordinates: 43.4056°N 23.1178°E
- Country: Bulgaria
- Province: Montana Province
- Municipality: Montana

Area
  - Total: 23,034 km^{2} (8,893 sq mi)

Population (2015)
  - Total: 475
- Time zone: UTC+2 (EET)
  - Summer (DST): UTC+3 (EEST)

Gorno Tserovene is a village in Montana Municipality, Montana Province, northwestern Bulgaria.
