= Stubel =

Stubel Стубел
- Village
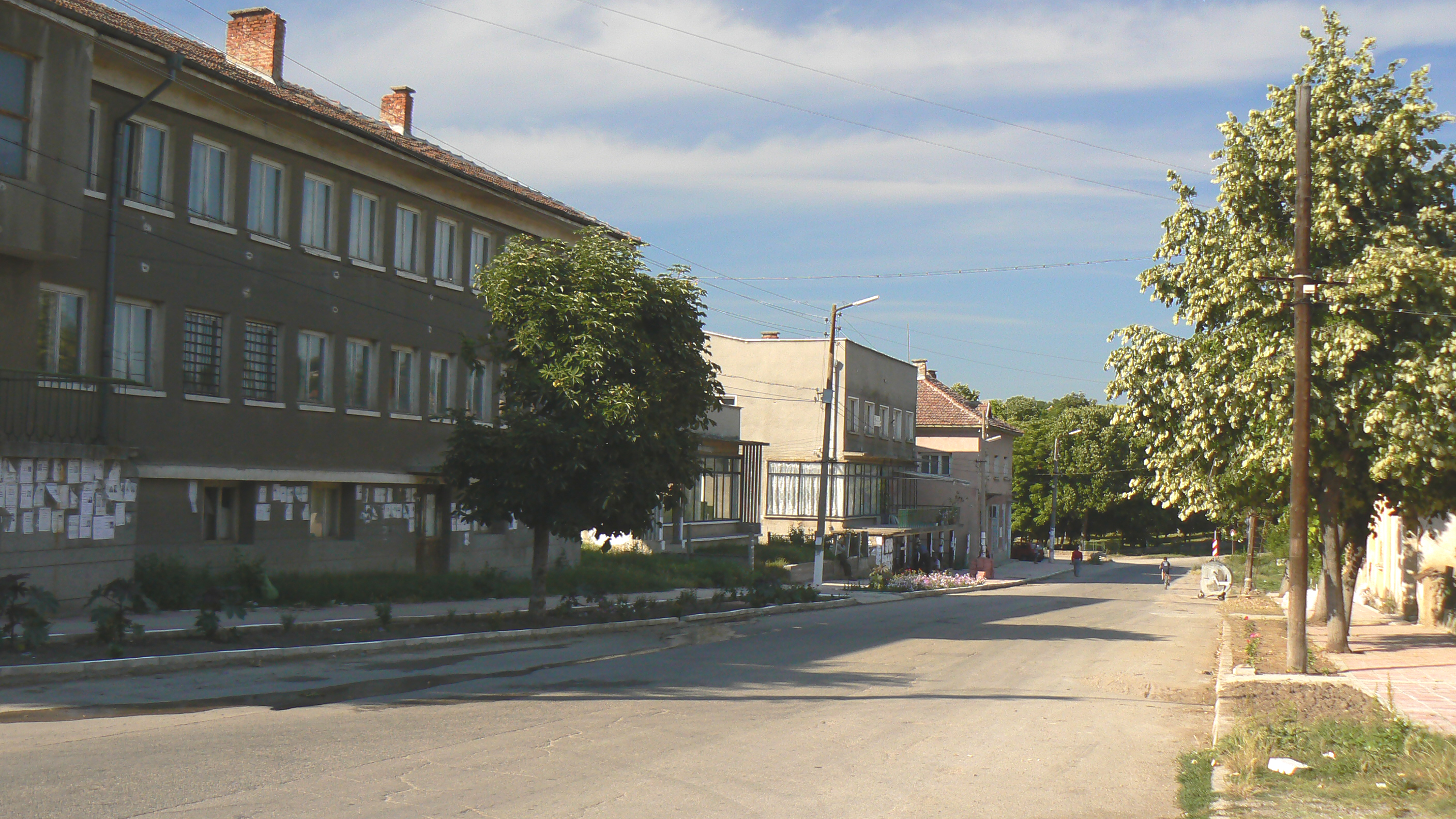

- Location within Bulgaria
Coordinates: 43.3892°N 23.3500°E
- Country: Bulgaria
- Province: Montana Province
- Municipality: Montana

Area
  - Total: 38.347 km^{2} (14.806 sq mi)
- Elevation: 259 m (850 ft)

Population (2011)
  - Total: 607
  - Density: 15.8/km^{2} (41.0/sq mi)
- Time zone: UTC+2 (EET)
  - Summer (DST): UTC+3 (EEST)

Stubel is an abandonment village in Montana Municipality, Montana Province, northwestern Bulgaria.
