= Gorna Verenitsa =

Gorna Verenitsa Горна Вереница
- Village
- Location within Bulgaria
- Coordinates: 43.4417°N 23.1000°E
- Country: Bulgaria
- Province: Montana Province
- Municipality: Montana
- Time zone: UTC+2 (EET)
  - Summer (DST): UTC+3 (EEST)

Gorna Verenitsa is a village in Montana Municipality, Montana Province, western Bulgaria. It has a population of approximately 186 people.
