= Septemvriytsi, Montana Province =

Septemvriytsi, Montana Province Септемврийци
- Location of Septemvriytsi
- Coordinates: 43°36′45″N 23°30′42″E
- Country: Bulgaria
- Province (Oblast): Montana

Government
  - Mayor: Dimitar Bonev
- Elevation: 106 m (348 ft)

Population (2009-03-15)
  - Total: 1,165
- Time zone: UTC+2 (EET)
  - Summer (DST): UTC+3 (EEST)
- Postal Code: 3637
- Area code: 09740

Septemvriytsi (Bulgarian: Септемврийци) is a village in Northwestern Bulgaria. It is located in Valchedram Municipality, Montana Province.

== See also ==
- List of villages in Montana Province
