= Doktor Yosifovo =

Doktor Yosifovo Доктор Йосифово
- Village
- Location within Bulgaria
- Coordinates: 43.5000°N 23.1500°E
- Country: Bulgaria
- Province: Montana Province
- Municipality: Montana
- Time zone: UTC+2 (EET)
  - Summer (DST): UTC+3 (EEST)

Doktor Yosifovo is a village in Montana Municipality, Montana Province, western Bulgaria.
