= Barzia =

Coordinates: 43°11′54″N 023°09′40″E

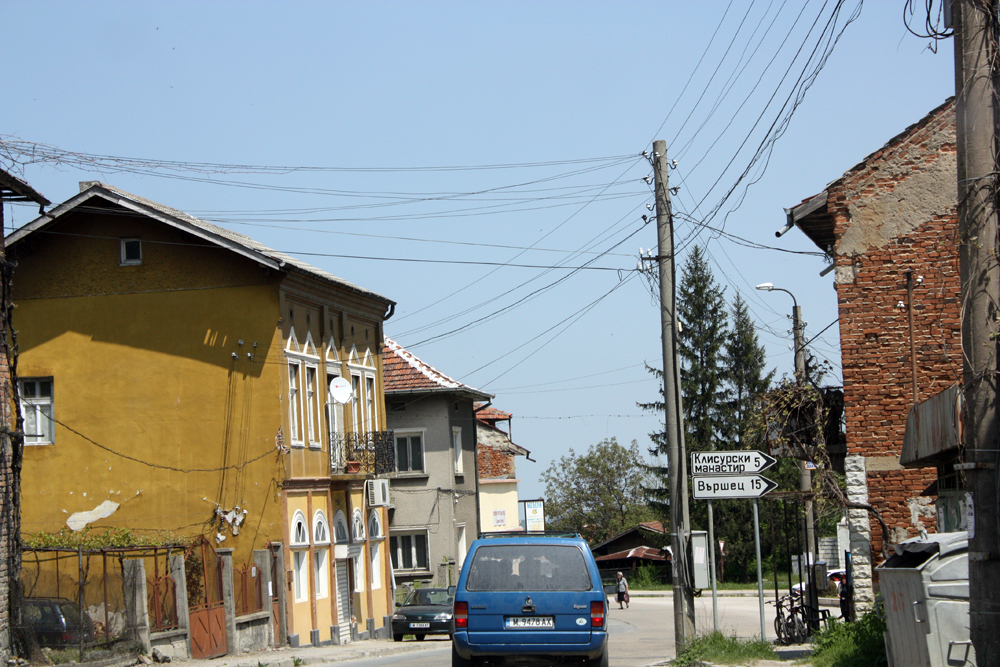
Central part of Barzia

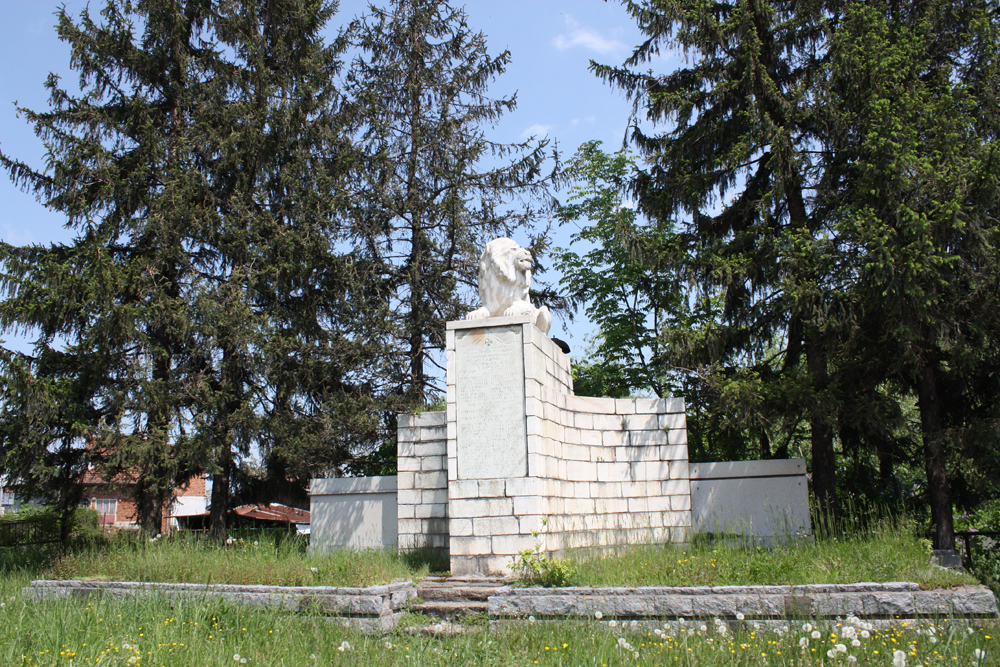
War memorial in Barzia

Barzia (Bulgarian: Бързия, also transliterated as Burzia, Barziya, Burziya or Bŭrziya) is a village (село) in northwestern Bulgaria, located in the Berkovitsa Municipality (община Берковица) of the Montana Province (Област Монтана).

== Honours ==
Barziya Peak on Loubet Coast, Antarctica is named after the village.
