= Kovachitsa =

Kovachitsa Ковачица
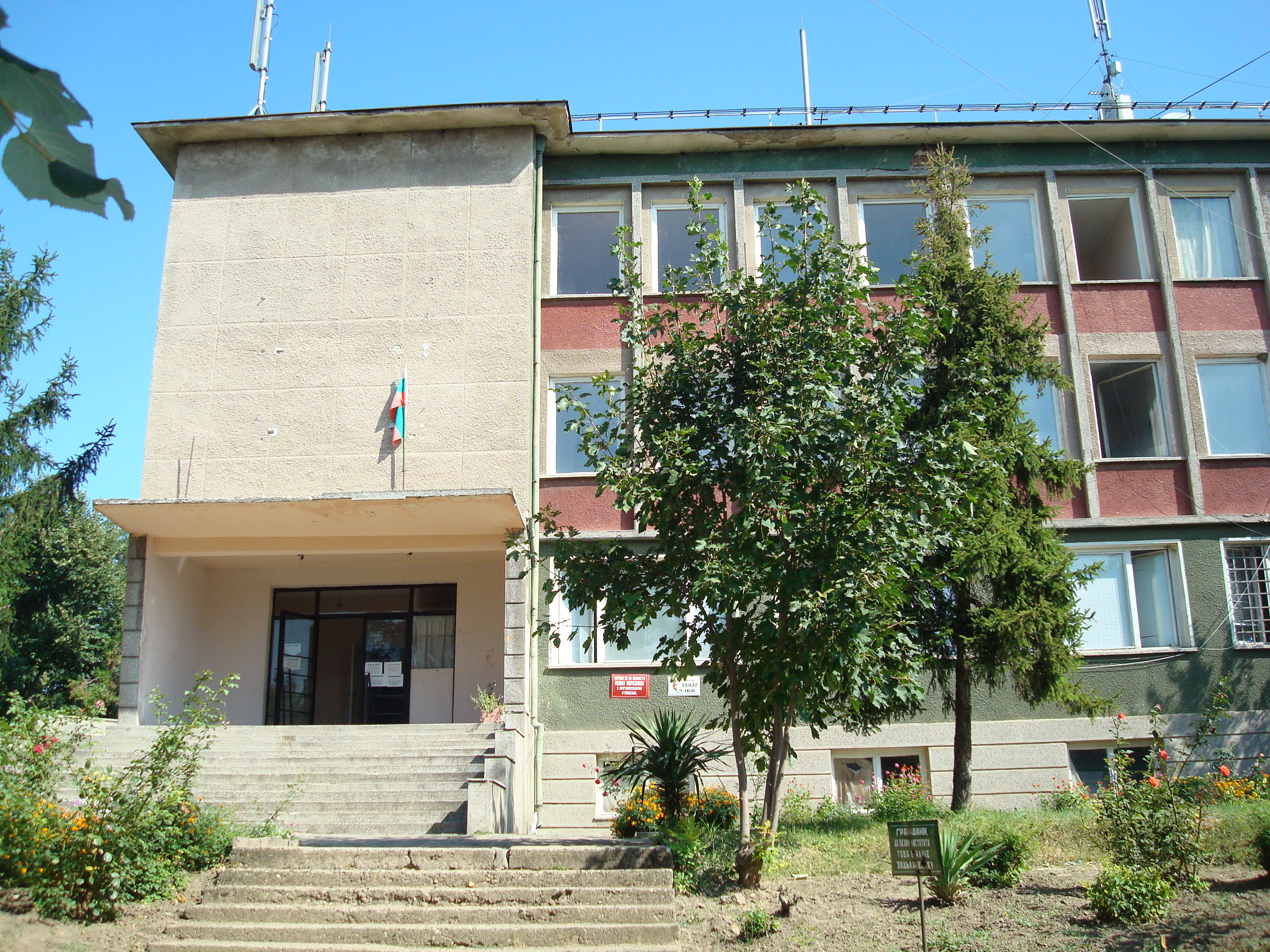
- Village hall

- Location of Kovachitsa
- Coordinates: 43°48′02″N 23°21′45″E
- Country: Bulgaria
- Province (Oblast): Montana

Government
  - Mayor: Liliya Seferinova
- Elevation: 97 m (318 ft)

Population (2009-03-15)
  - Total: 1,235
- Time zone: UTC+2 (EET)
  - Summer (DST): UTC+3 (EEST)
- Postal Code: 3643
- Area code: 09720

Kovachitsa (Bulgarian: Ковачица) is a village in northwestern Bulgaria. It is located in Lom Municipality, Montana Province.

== History ==
The history of the village dates from the end of Chiprovtsi Uprising (broken on September 6, 1688 from Osmans). After the defeat of uprising people, the survivors fled to all parts of Bulgaria; some of them settled along the Danube river near Lom (Lom Palanka, or Roman name of Almus). Because cholera broke out, some of the people moved to the local blacksmith, who lived 5 km from the river, where now lies the village - and from there is the origin of the name Kovachitsa. The village has fame with his famous watermelons (or "lubenitsi" as they say there) and orchards in the area of the Danube in the area "Staraneto". There was lived and Santa Mityo - "Bostangiyata" who was known for cultivation of so famous 'lubenitsi'. On the banks of the Danube, where the old village was located in the area "Staraneto", have a hill (near the inn of Baba Stoyna), which is called - Baba Stoynina mound. There lived Grandmother Stoyna, which has welcomed the Turks sail, who were drawn by people. The legend is that Grandmother Stoyna was poisoned they wine while Turks dined, after that threw their corpses into a well (along with all valuables they wore), liberating slaves and sail placed along a river. For mound itself is said that it has a church underneath. This mound has been sought for decades by treasure hunters. The belief is that the Turks were thrown into the well with her jewels. In the surrounding area are being found many treasures, but everything is sold out on the black market.

== Places ==
Near the village are two dams (East and West from village), which offer plenty of fish. The river Danube is 5 km from a dusty road in North, perfect for off-road fans, it also offers opportunity for fishing (pikes, catfish, cod and others), also for sunbathing on the shore. Near the west end of west dam there is a century-old tree referred to as Mono's oak.

== See also ==
- List of villages in Montana Province
