= Cherkaski =

Cherkaski Черкаски
- Village
- Location within Bulgaria
- Coordinates: 43.2550°N 23.2914°E
- Country: Bulgaria
- Province: Montana Province
- Municipality: Varshets
- Time zone: UTC+2 (EET)
  - Summer (DST): UTC+3 (EEST)

Cherkaski is a village in Varshets Municipality, Montana Province, northwestern Bulgaria.
