= Gaganitsa =

Gaganitsa Гаганица
- Village
- Location within Bulgaria
- Coordinates: 43.3306°N 23.1089°E
- Country: Bulgaria
- Province: Montana Province
- Municipality: Berkovitsa
- Time zone: UTC+2 (EET)
  - Summer (DST): UTC+3 (EEST)

Gaganitsa is a village in Berkovitsa Municipality, Montana Province, north-western Bulgaria.
