= Portitovtsi =

Portitovtsi Портитовци
- Village
- Location within Bulgaria
- Coordinates: 43°30′N 23°22′E
- Country: Bulgaria
- Province: Montana Province
- Municipality: Boychinovtsi
- Time zone: UTC+2 (EET)
  - Summer (DST): UTC+3 (EEST)

Portitovtsi is a village in Boychinovtsi Municipality, Montana Province, north-western Bulgaria.
