= Vinishte, Bulgaria =

Vinishte
- Village
- Location within Bulgaria
- Country: Bulgaria
- Province: Montana
- Municipality: Montana

Population
  - Total: 400
- Time zone: UTC+1 (CET)
  - Summer (DST): UTC+2 (CEST)

Vinište is a small village in North Bulgaria, 16 km (9.9 mi) north of Montana, Bulgaria. The village is located in the foothills of the Balkan Mountains and has a population of 400 people. Near Vinište there is a formation of rocks called Kamiko. The village name reflects the good conditions in the region for cultivating grapes and making wine (Bulgarian vino, English wine).

== History ==
This region of Bulgaria became part of the Roman Empire in 26 BC. About AD 150, the Romans built a stronghold in the region called Montana, and the military division that first settled there was recruited in the Swiss Alps. The town was populated by Latin-speaking local tribes who were later called Wallachs by the Slavs. Christianity was introduced in AD 325.

Vinište is first mentioned in 15th-century Ottoman tax documents. The village is located on an important road that connects Sofia with Vidin on the Danube river and from there to Central Europe. The road was used for carrying the collected taxes and military retreat first by the Romans (from the Balkans to Central Europe), by the Bulgarians and by the Turks (from Central Europe to Constantinople).

Roman coins have been found around Vinište and can be seen in the museums in Montana and Sofia.

== Traditions ==
Though Vinište has been Christian since the 9th century, pagan customs were maintained into the 20th century. One such custom is the kurban. In older days, kurban involved a ritualistic animal sacrifice but in modern times, it is a gathering around a special stone or other symbol. In Vinište, the stone is in the form of a cross, about 1.7 m (5 ft 7 in) in height. The inscription on the stone reads, "St. Constantine Year Of Our Lord 1804".
