= Slavotin =

Slavotin Славотин
- Village
- Location within Bulgaria
- Coordinates: 43.5500°N 23.0667°E
- Country: Bulgaria
- Province: Montana Province
- Municipality: Montana
- Time zone: UTC+2 (EET)
  - Summer (DST): UTC+3 (EEST)

Slavotin is a village in Montana Municipality, Montana Province, northwestern Bulgaria.
