= Madan, Montana Province =

Coordinates: 43°35′N 023°27′E

Madan Мадан
- Village
- Interactive map of Madan
- Country: Bulgaria
- Province: Montana Province
- Municipality: Boychinovtsi

Government
  - Mayor: Владимир Илиев
- Time zone: UTC+2 (EET)
  - Summer (DST): UTC+3 (EEST)

Madan (Bulgarian: Мадан) is a village (село) in Northwestern Bulgaria, located in Boychinovtsi Municipality (община Бойчиновци) of Montana Province (Област Монтана).
