= Berkovitsa Municipality =

Berkovitsa Municipality Община Берковица
- Municipality
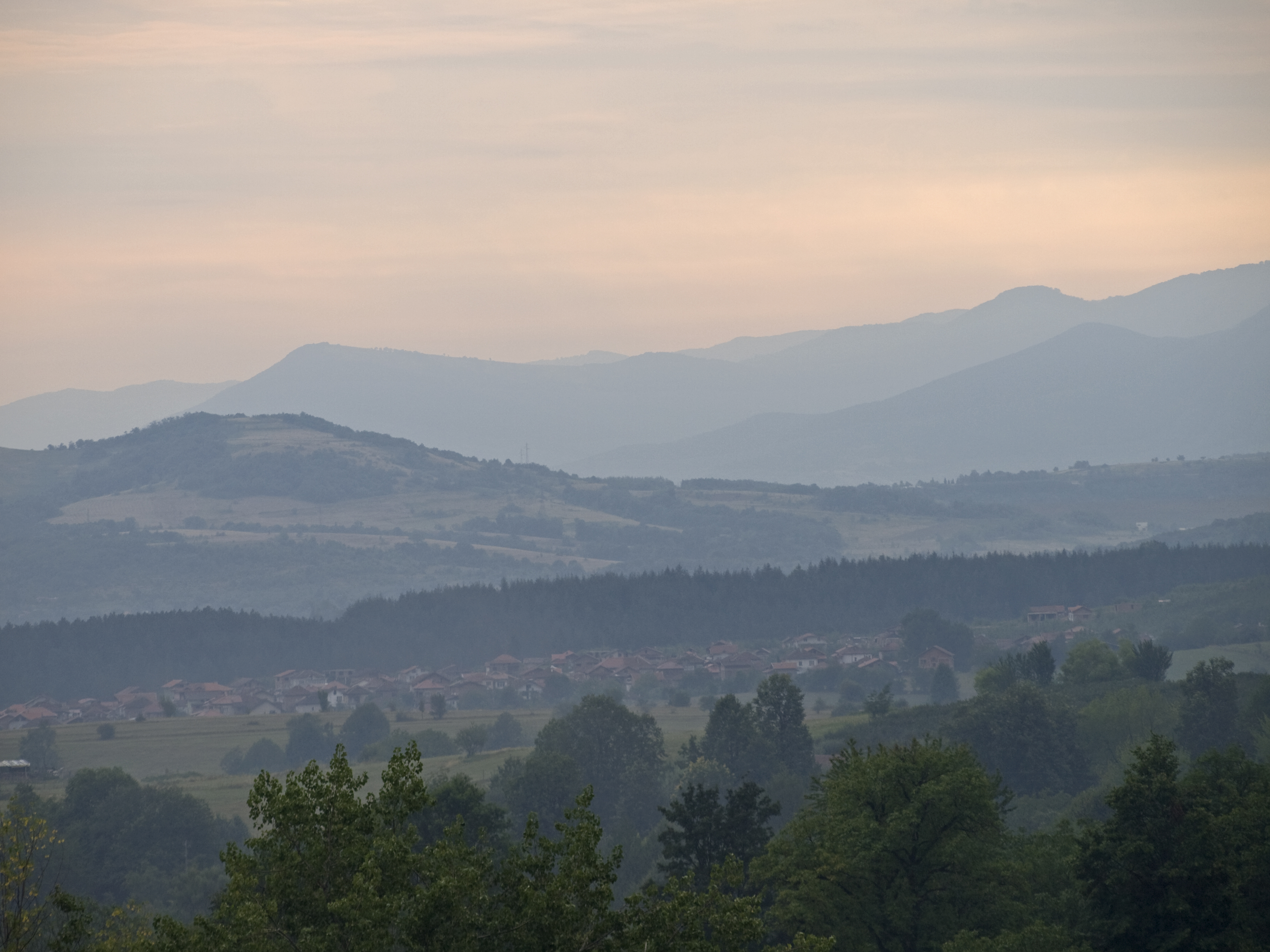
- Stara Planina as seen from Berkovitsa

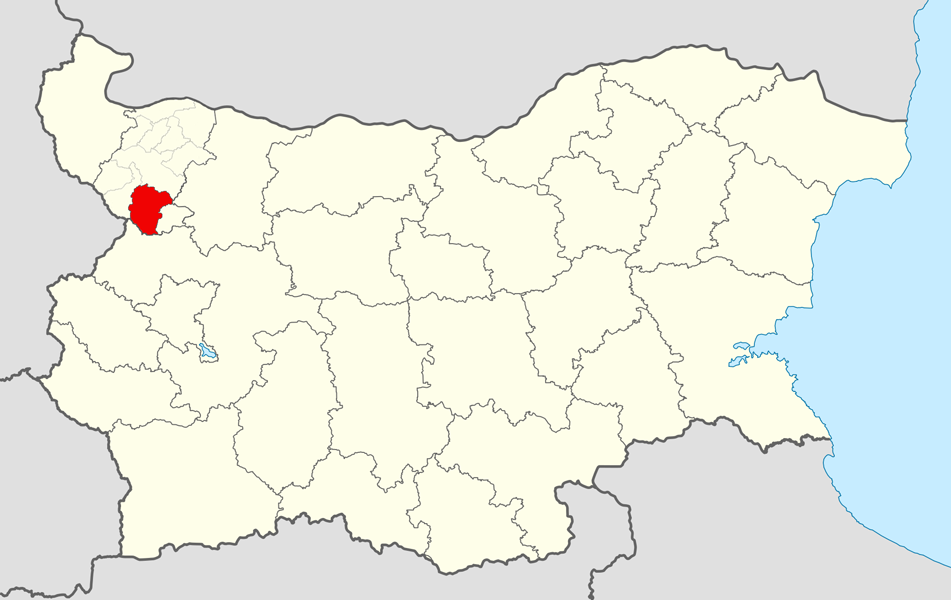
- Berkovitsa Municipality within Bulgaria and Montana Province.
- Coordinates: 43°15′N 23°8′E
- Country: Bulgaria
- Province (Oblast): Montana
- Admin. centre (Obshtinski tsentar): Berkovitsa

Area
  - Total: 470 km^{2} (180 sq mi)

Population (Census February 2011)
  - Total: 17,267
  - Density: 37/km^{2} (95/sq mi)
- Time zone: UTC+2 (EET)
  - Summer (DST): UTC+3 (EEST)

Berkovitsa Municipality (Bulgarian: Община Берковица) is a municipality (obshtina) in Montana Province, Northwestern Bulgaria, located in the area of the so-called Fore-Balkan to the northern slopes of the western Stara planina mountain. It is named after its administrative centre - the town of Berkovitsa.

The municipality embraces a territory of 470 km^{2} (180 sq mi) with a population of 18,503 inhabitants, as of February 2011.

Todorini Kukli peak, 1,785 m (5,856 ft), is located in the southeastern part of the area almost on the very border with Varshets Municipality.

== Settlements ==
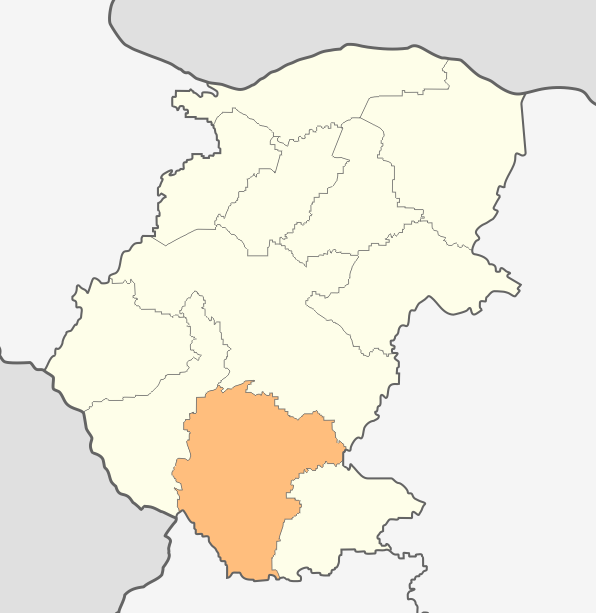
Berkovitsa Municipality within Montana Province

Berkovitsa Municipality includes the following 20 places (towns are shown in bold):

Town/Village	Cyrillic	Population (September 2022)
**Berkovitsa**	**Берковица**	12,768
Balyuvitsa	Балювица	52
Bistrilitsa	Бистрилица	141
Bokilovtsi	Бокиловци	77
Borovtsi	Боровци	657
Barziya	Бързия	1,259
Chereshovitsa	Черешовица	40
Gaganitsa	Гаганица	269
Komarevo	Комарево	67
Kostentsi	Костенци	46
Kotenovtsi	Котеновци	111
Leskovets	Лесковец	43
Mezdreya	Мездрея	182
Pesochnitsa	Песочница	23
Parlichevo	Пърличево	62
Rashovitsa	Рашовица	5
Slatina	Слатина	165
Tsvetkova Bara	Цветкова бара	14
Yagodovo	Ягодово	176
Zamfirovo	Замфирово	1,110
Total		17,267

== Demography ==
The following table shows the change of the population during the last four decades.

Berkovitsa Municipality
Year	1975	1985	1992	2001	2005	2007	2009	2011
Population	28,639	26,565	24,992	22,664	20,812	20,277	19,642	18,503
Sources: Census 2001, Census 2011, „pop-stat.mashke.org“,

=== Religion ===
According to the latest Bulgarian census of 2011, the religious composition, among those who answered the optional question on religious identification, was the following:

Religious composition of Berkovitsa Municipality
Orthodox Christianity	77.0%
Catholicism	0.2%
Protestantism	1.7%
Islam	0.0%
No religion	11.1%
Prefer not to answer, others and indefinable	10.0%

== Economy ==
=== Transportation ===
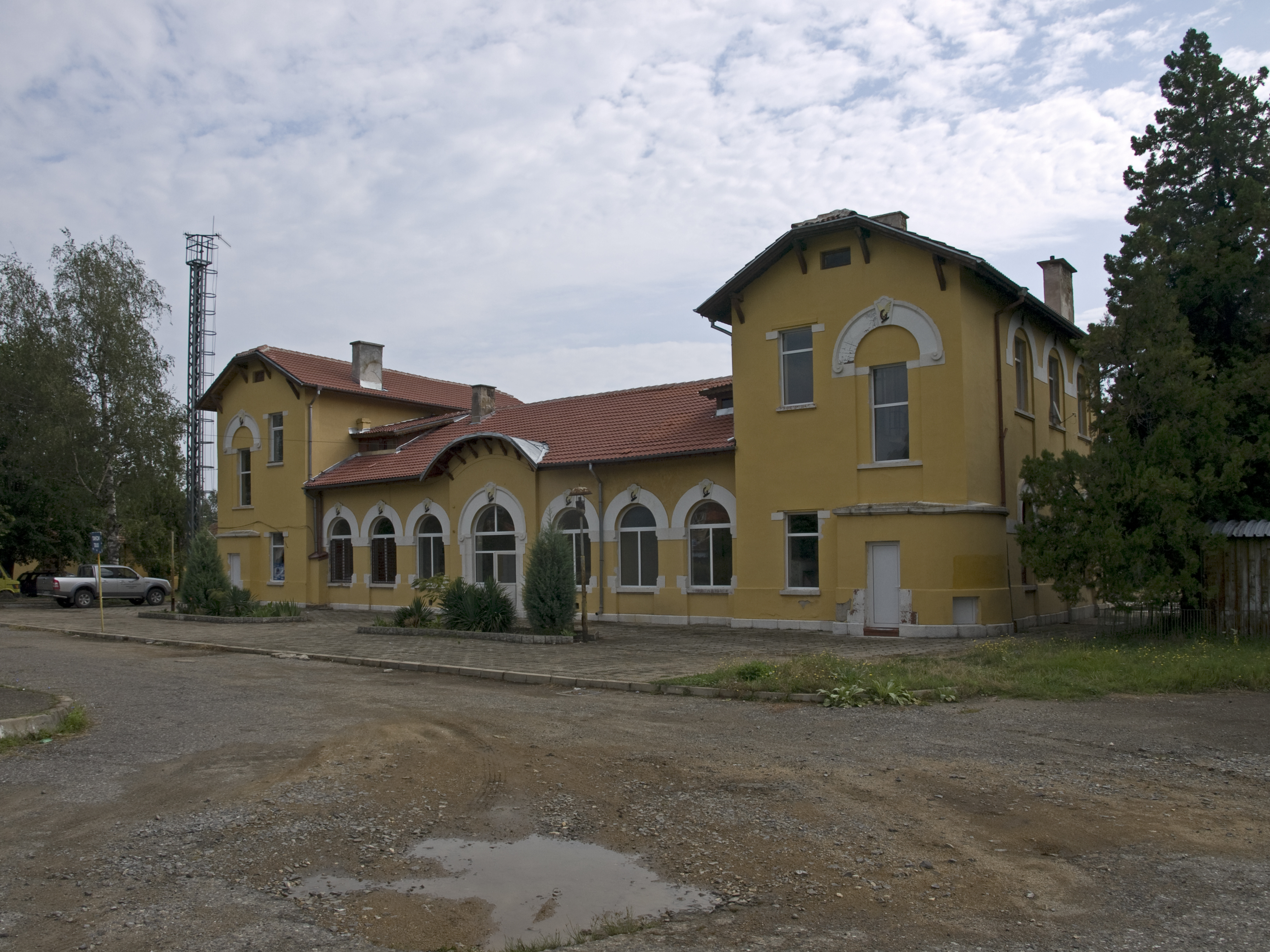
Berkovitsa railway station

Berkovitsa has a terminus railway station. It is connected to Montana and has access to the railway connecting Vidin and Vratsa. There is infrequent passenger traffic.

== See also ==
- Provinces of Bulgaria
- Municipalities of Bulgaria
- List of cities and towns in Bulgaria
