= Balyuvitsa =

Balyuvitsa Балювица
- Village
- Location within Bulgaria
- Coordinates: 43.2969°N 23.2031°E
- Country: Bulgaria
- Province: Montana Province
- Municipality: Berkovitsa
- Time zone: UTC+2 (EET)
  - Summer (DST): UTC+3 (EEST)

Balyuvitsa is a village in Berkovitsa Municipality, Montana Province, northern Bulgaria.
