= Sumer, Bulgaria =

Sumer Сумер
- Village
- Location within Bulgaria
- Coordinates: 43.3333°N 23.3333°E
- Country: Bulgaria
- Province: Montana Province
- Municipality: Montana
- Time zone: UTC+2 (EET)
  - Summer (DST): UTC+3 (EEST)

Sumer is a village in Montana Municipality, Montana Province, northwestern Bulgaria.
