= Ohrid, Bulgaria =

Ohrid Охрид
- Village
- Location within Bulgaria
- Coordinates: 43.4500°N 23.3833°E
- Country: Bulgaria
- Province: Montana Province
- Municipality: Boychinovtsi
- Time zone: UTC+2 (EET)
  - Summer (DST): UTC+3 (EEST)

Ohrid (Bulgarian: Охрид, also transliterated as Okhrid) is a village (село) in northwestern Bulgaria, located in the Boychinovtsi municipality (община Бойчиновци) of the Montana Province (Област Монтана).
