= Palilula, Bulgaria =

Palilula Палилула
- Village
- Location within Bulgaria
- Coordinates: 43.4367°N 23.3881°E
- Country: Bulgaria
- Province: Montana Province
- Municipality: Boychinovtsi
- Time zone: UTC+2 (EET)
  - Summer (DST): UTC+3 (EEST)

Palilula (Bulgarian: Палилула) is a village in Boychinovtsi Municipality, Montana Province, north-western Bulgaria.

== Honours ==
Palilula Glacier on Brabant Island, Antarctica, is named after the village.
