= Pesochnitsa =

Pesochnitsa Песочница
- Village
- Interactive map of Pesochnitsa
- Coordinates: 43°15′10″N 23°12′17″E
- Country: Bulgaria
- Province: Montana Province
- Municipality: Berkovitsa

Government
- Elevation: 474 m (1,555 ft)

Population
  - Total: 65
- Time zone: UTC+2 (EET)
  - Summer (DST): UTC+3 (EEST)
- Area code: 3519

Pesochnitsa is a village in Berkovitsa Municipality, Montana Province, north-western Bulgaria.

== Geography ==
Pesochnica is located between hills on the banks of a creek called the Pescaitsa. The summers are cool and tranquil, the winters are generally mild. The hills to the south, east and west are covered with different types of hardwood.

== History ==
Pesochnica has existed since at least the time of the Ottoman Empire invasion and occupation of Bulgaria in the late fourteenth century, and there is some evidence that its existence dates to the Second Bulgarian Empire (1185 to 1396). Turkish tax documents from the end of the fifteenth century indicate that the inhabitants of Pesochnica had been paying taxes at that time.
