= Bela, Vidin Province =

Bela (Bulgarian: Бела) is a village in northwestern Bulgaria. It has a population of 108 inhabitants. It is part of the Dimovo municipality, Vidin Province. It is situated on the main highway E79 about 5.6 km south of the town of Dimovo, and about 39 km south of Vidin. Nearby villages include Skomlya, Karbintsi and Oreshets. The main railway line between Sofia and Vidin passes through the village.

Bela has been existent since the 18th century. The village was traditionally a regional milling center, milling wheat for farmers from nearby villages, but mills have not been operational for quite some time.

The village is divided into two parts: Gorna (Upper) Bela and Dolna (Lower) Bela. A tributary of the Archar river runs through the village. A 20 m waterfall, Bobuka, is situated on the outskirts of Bela.
