= Spanchevtsi =

Spanchevtsi Спанчевци
- Village
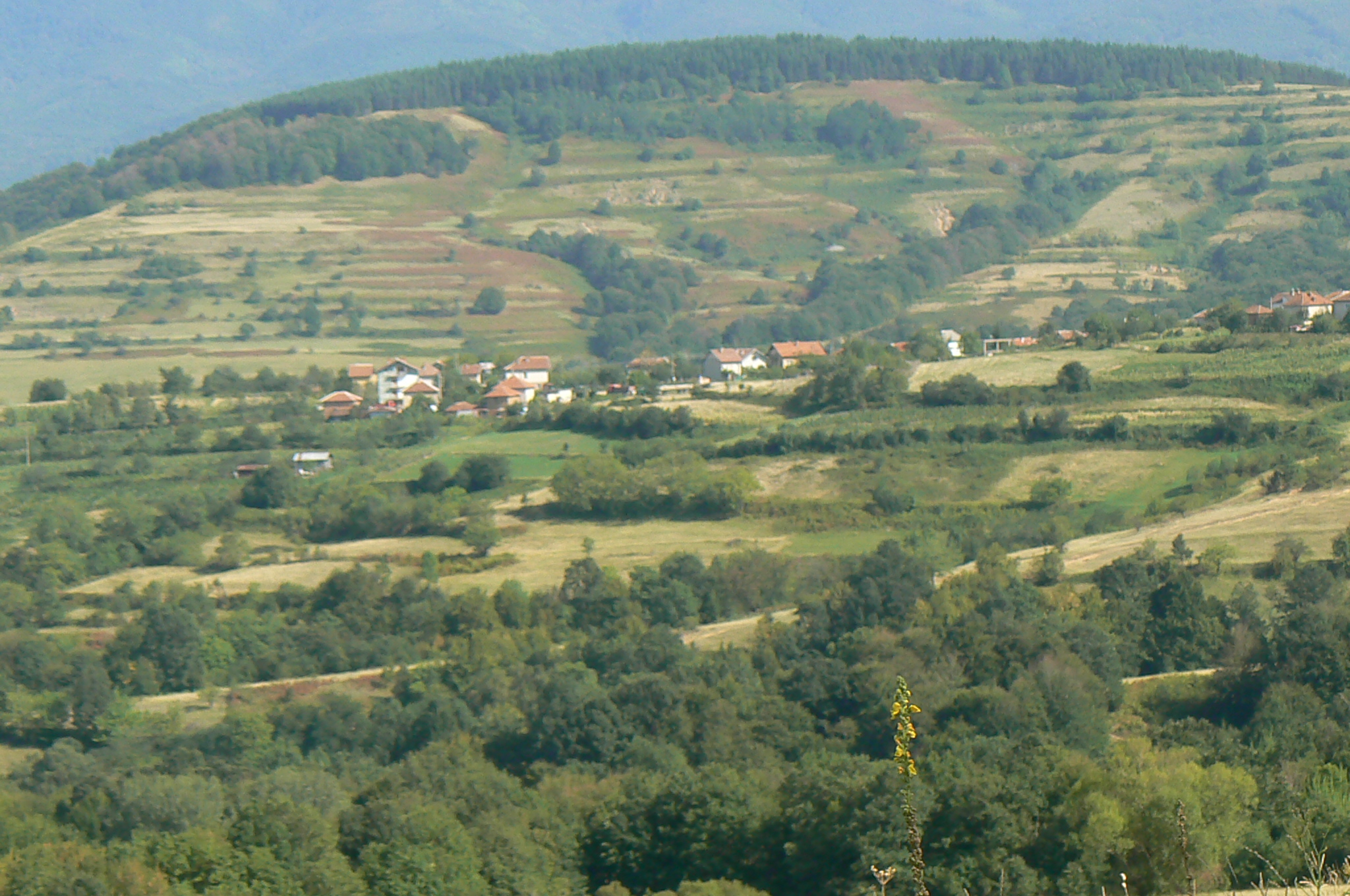
- Aerial view of the village

- Location within Bulgaria
- Coordinates: 43.1864°N 23.2356°E
- Country: Bulgaria
- Province: Montana Province
- Municipality: Varshets
- Time zone: UTC+2 (EET)
  - Summer (DST): UTC+3 (EEST)

Spanchevtsi is a village in Varshets Municipality, Montana Province, northwestern Bulgaria.
