= Kostentsi =

Kostentsi Костенци
- Village
- Location in Bulgaria
- Coordinates: 43°16′59.88″N 23°7′14.88″E
- Country: Bulgaria
- Province: Montana
- Municipality: Berkovitsa

Area
  - Total: 19,053 km^{2} (7,356 sq mi)
- Elevation: 450 m (1,480 ft)

Population (2015)
  - Total: 63
- Time zone: UTC+2 (EET)
  - Summer (DST): UTC+3 (EEST)
- Postal code: 3518
- Area code: 0953
- Vehicle registration: М

Kostentsi is a village in Berkovitsa Municipality, Montana Province, north-western Bulgaria.
