= Vladimirovo, Montana Province =

Vladimirovo Владимирово
- Village
- Location within Bulgaria
- Coordinates: 43.5333°N 23.3833°E
- Country: Bulgaria
- Province: Montana Province
- Municipality: Boychinovtsi
- Time zone: UTC+2 (EET)
  - Summer (DST): UTC+3 (EEST)

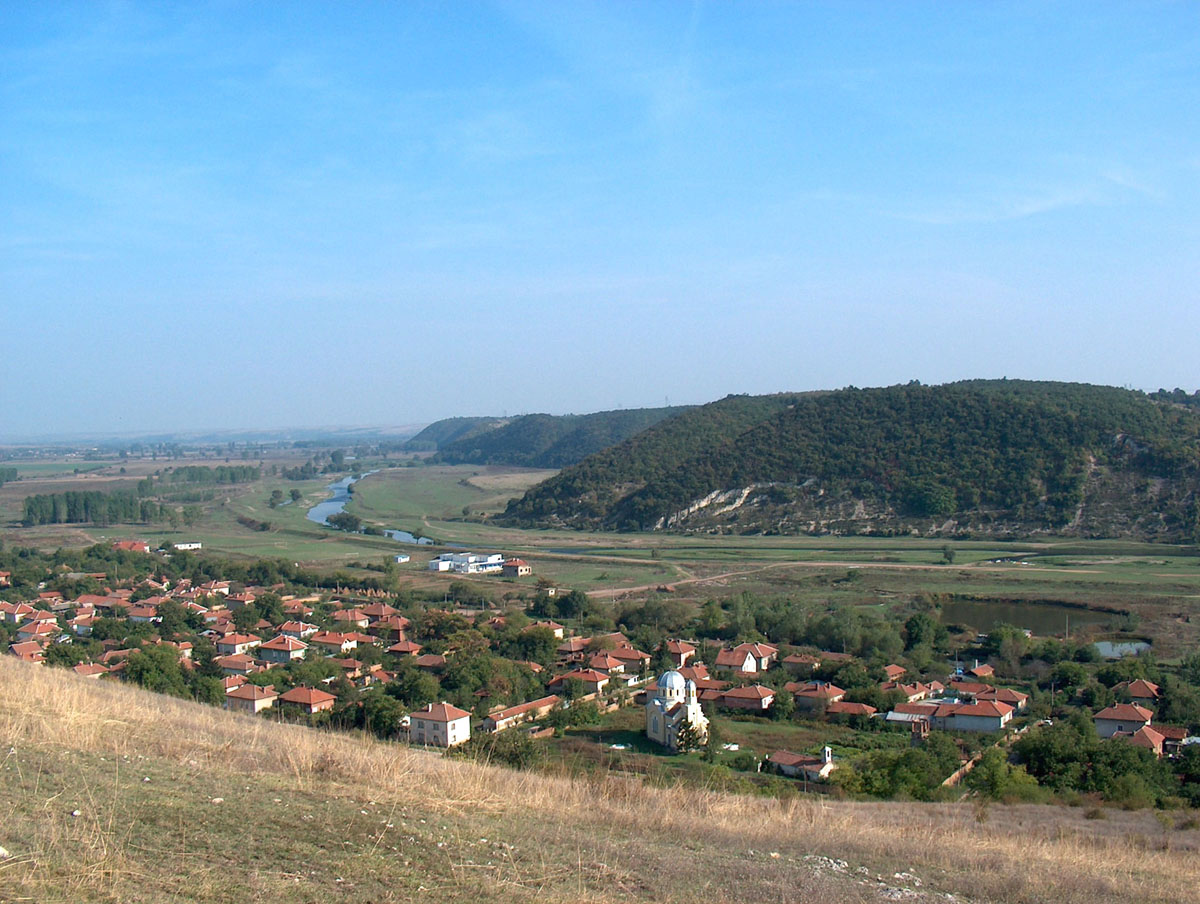
Vladimirovo

Vladimirovo is a village in Boychinovtsi Municipality, Montana Province, north-western Bulgaria.
