= Odorovtsi =

Odorovtsi Одоровци
- Village
- Location within Bulgaria
- Coordinates: 43°34′36″N 22°57′34″E
- Country: Bulgaria
- Province: Montana Province
- Municipality: Brusartsi
- Time zone: UTC+2 (EET)
  - Summer (DST): UTC+3 (EEST)

Odorovtsi is a village in Brusartsi Municipality, Montana Province, north-western Bulgaria.
