= Dolna Verenitsa =

Dolna Verenitsa Долна Рикса
- Village
- Location within Bulgaria
- Coordinates: 43.4333°N 23.1333°E
- Country: Bulgaria
- Province: Montana Province
- Municipality: Montana
- Time zone: UTC+2 (EET)
  - Summer (DST): UTC+3 (EEST)

Dolna Verenitsa is a village in Montana Municipality, Montana Province, western Bulgaria.
