= Lehchevo =

Lehchevo Лехчево
- Location of Lehchevo
- Coordinates: 43°32′N 23°32′E
- Country: Bulgaria
- Province (Oblast): Montana

Government
  - Mayor: Slavey Kostadinov
- Elevation: 71 m (233 ft)

Population (2008-12-15)
  - Total: 1,954
- Time zone: UTC+2 (EET)
  - Summer (DST): UTC+3 (EEST)
- Postal Code: 3445
- Area code: 09516

Lehchevo (Bulgarian: Лехчево [lɛxˈt͡ʃɛvo]) is a village in Boychinovtsi Municipality of Montana Province, northwestern Bulgaria. It has a population of about 2,000 people. It is located on the left bank of the Ogosta river.

The only means of transportation linking Lehchevo to other villages and towns nearby is the bus transport system.
