= Tsvetkova bara =

Tsvetkova Bara Цветкова бара
- Village
- Location within Bulgaria
- Coordinates: 43.1967°N 23.1617°E
- Country: Bulgaria
- Province: Montana Province
- Municipality: Berkovitsa
- Time zone: UTC+2 (EET)
  - Summer (DST): UTC+3 (EEST)

Tsvetkova bara or Tsvetkova Bara (Bulgarian: Цветкова бара, also transcribed as Tzvetkova bara or Cvetkova bara) is a village (село) in northwestern Bulgaria, located in the Berkovitsa municipality (община Берковица) of the Montana Province (Област Монтана).
