= Dabova Mahala =

Dabova mahala Дъбова махала
- Village
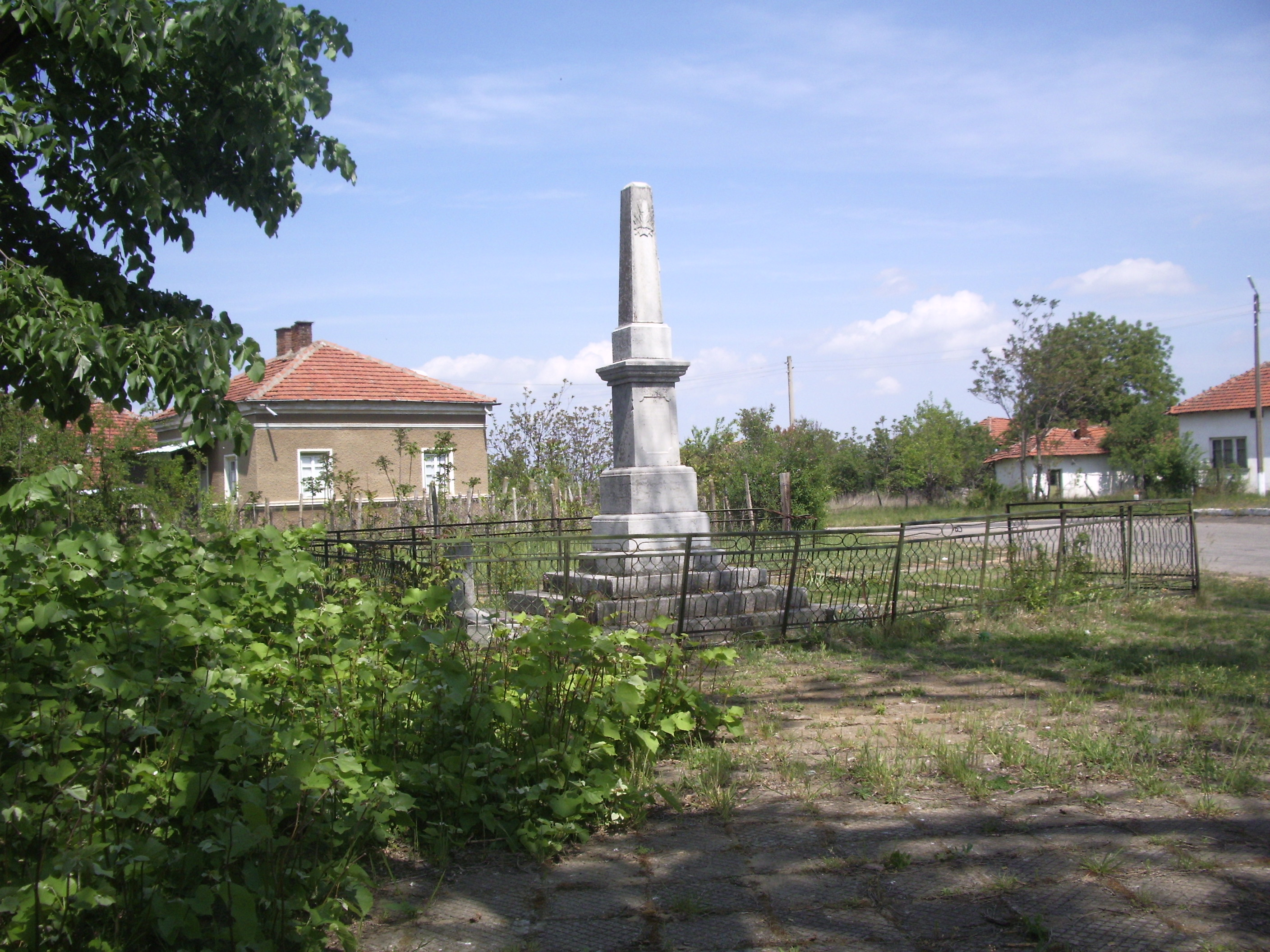
- The monument in the center of the village of Dabova Mahala

- Location within Bulgaria
- Coordinates: 43.6833°N 23.0167°E
- Country: Bulgaria
- Province: Montana Province
- Municipality: Brusartsi
- Time zone: UTC+2 (EET)
  - Summer (DST): UTC+3 (EEST)

Dabova mahala is a village in Brusartsi Municipality, Montana Province, north-western Bulgaria.
