= Parlichevo =

Parlichevo Пърличево
- Village
- Location in Bulgaria
- Coordinates: 43°17′12″N 23°18′11″E
- Country: Bulgaria
- Province: Montana Province
- Municipality: Berkovitsa
- Time zone: UTC+2 (EET)
  - Summer (DST): UTC+3 (EEST)

Parlichevo is a village in northwestern Bulgaria, located in Berkovitsa Municipality, Montana Province.
