= Gabrovnitsa, Montana Province =

Village in Montana Province, Bulgaria

Coordinates: 43.533°N 23.267°E

Gabrovnitsa (Bulgarian: Габровница) is a village in northwestern Bulgaria. It is located in the municipality of Montana in the Montana Province, 13 kilometres (8.1 mi) from the district center.

The Vidin - Sofia railway lines passes through the village. Below the line is the village itself and over the line is the military airport, which is now abandoned. The airport has a single runway. While it was operational, the airport had MiG-21 and MiG-23 aircraft and training fighters. It was responsible for air defense of the northwestern Bulgaria.
