= Gorno Ozirovo =

Gorno Ozirovo Горно Озирово
- Village
- Location within Bulgaria
- Coordinates: 43.2167°N 23.3933°E
- Country: Bulgaria
- Province: Montana Province
- Municipality: Varshets
- Time zone: UTC+2 (EET)
  - Summer (DST): UTC+3 (EEST)

Gorno Ozirovo is a village in Varshets Municipality, Montana Province, northwestern Bulgaria.
