= Slatina, Montana Province =

Slatina Слатина
- Village
- Location within Bulgaria
- Coordinates: 43.2156°N 23.2208°E
- Country: Bulgaria
- Province: Montana Province
- Municipality: Berkovitsa
- Time zone: UTC+2 (EET)
  - Summer (DST): UTC+3 (EEST)

Slatina is a village in Berkovitsa Municipality, Montana Province, north-western Bulgaria.
