= Draganitsa =

Draganitsa Драганица
- Village
- Location within Bulgaria
- Coordinates: 43.2408°N 23.2469°E
- Country: Bulgaria
- Province: Montana Province
- Municipality: Varshets

Government
  - Mayor: Mladena Dimitrova

Area
  - Total: 16.948 km^{2} (6.544 sq mi)
- Elevation: 400 m (1,300 ft)

Population (2014)
  - Total: 250
- Time zone: UTC+2 (EET)
  - Summer (DST): UTC+3 (EEST)

Draganitsa is a village in Varshets Municipality, Montana Province, northwestern Bulgaria.
