= Komarevo, Montana Province =

Komarevo Комарево
- Village
- Location within Bulgaria
- Coordinates: 43.2789°N 23.1653°E
- Country: Bulgaria
- Province: Montana Province
- Municipality: Berkovitsa
- Time zone: UTC+2 (EET)
  - Summer (DST): UTC+3 (EEST)

Komarevo is a village in Berkovitsa Municipality, Montana Province, north-western Bulgaria.
