= Smolyanovtsi =

Smolyanovtsi Смоляновци
- Village
- Location within Bulgaria
- Coordinates: 43.5000°N 22.9833°E
- Country: Bulgaria
- Province: Montana Province
- Municipality: Montana
- Time zone: UTC+2 (EET)
  - Summer (DST): UTC+3 (EEST)

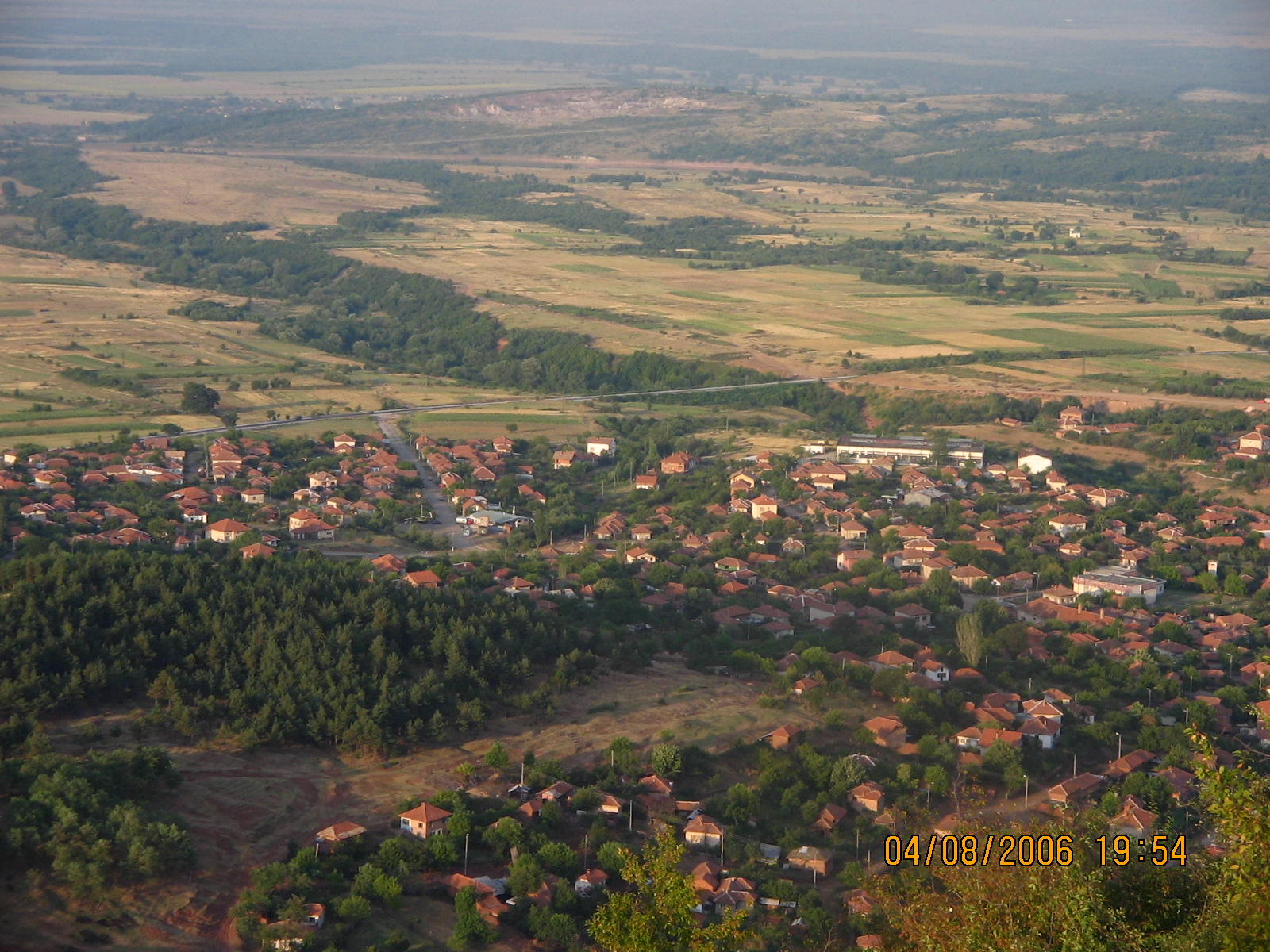

Smolyanovtsi is a village in Montana Municipality, Montana Province, northwestern Bulgaria.
