= Krapchene =

Krapchene Крапчене
- Village
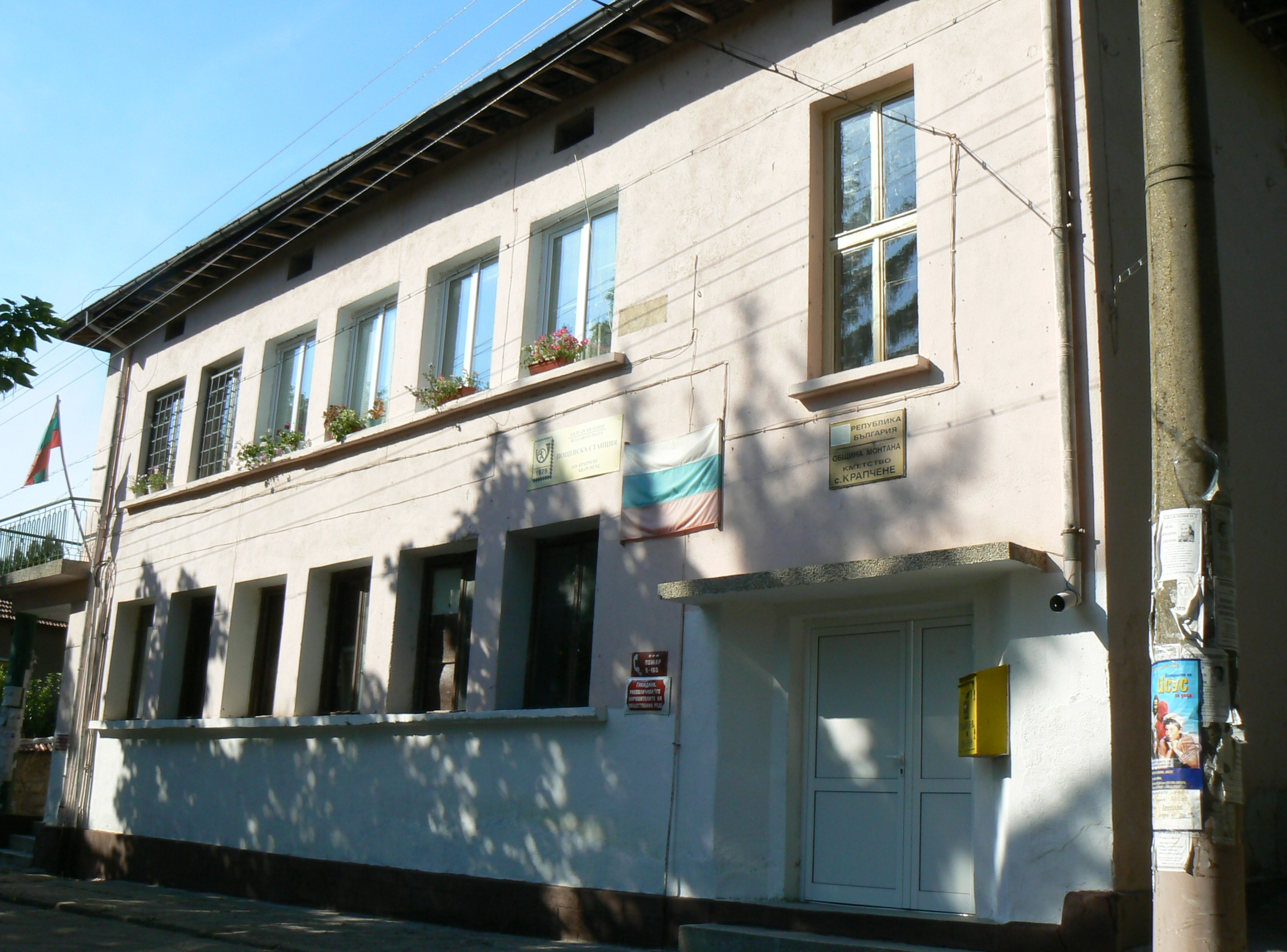
- Village hall

- Location within Bulgaria
- Coordinates: 43.3856°N 23.3033°E
- Country: Bulgaria
- Province: Montana Province
- Municipality: Montana
- Time zone: UTC+2 (EET)
  - Summer (DST): UTC+3 (EEST)

Krapchene is a village in Montana Municipality, Montana Province, Bulgaria.
