= Dolno Ozirovo =

Dolno Ozirovo Долно Озирово
- Village
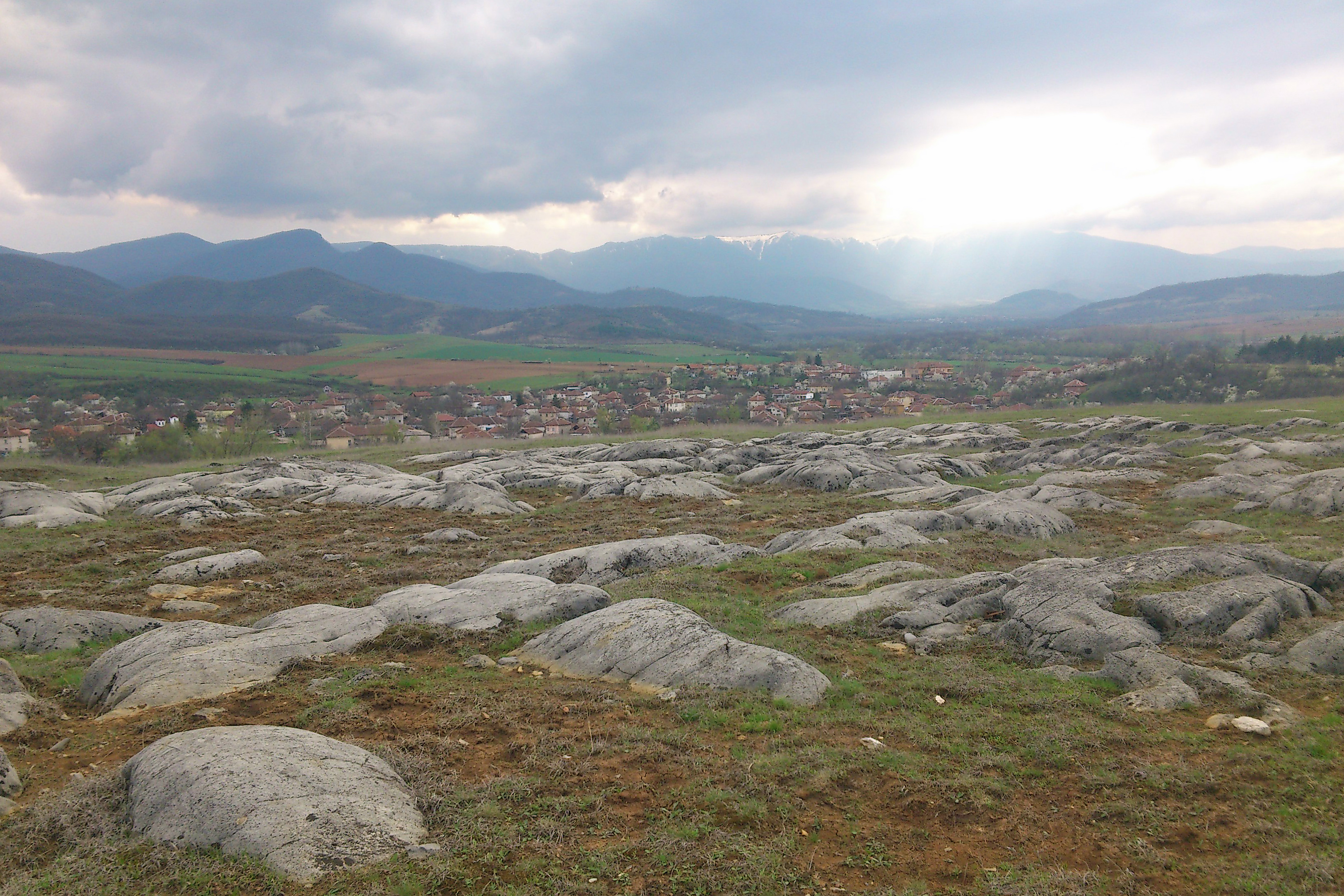
- Natural heritage site in Dolno Ozirovo

- Location within Bulgaria
- Coordinates: 43.2392°N 23.3519°E
- Country: Bulgaria
- Province: Montana Province
- Municipality: Varshets
- Time zone: UTC+2 (EET)
  - Summer (DST): UTC+3 (EEST)

Dolno Ozirovo is a village in Varshets Municipality, Montana Province, northwestern Bulgaria.
