= Yagodovo, Montana Province =

Village in Bulgaria

Coordinates: 43°13′12″N 023°11′18″E

Yagodovo (Bulgarian: Ягодово) is a village (село) in northwestern Bulgaria, located in the Berkovitsa Municipality (община Берковица) of the Montana Province (област Монтана).
