= Dolna Bela Rechka =

Dolna Bela Rechka Долна Бела речка
- Village
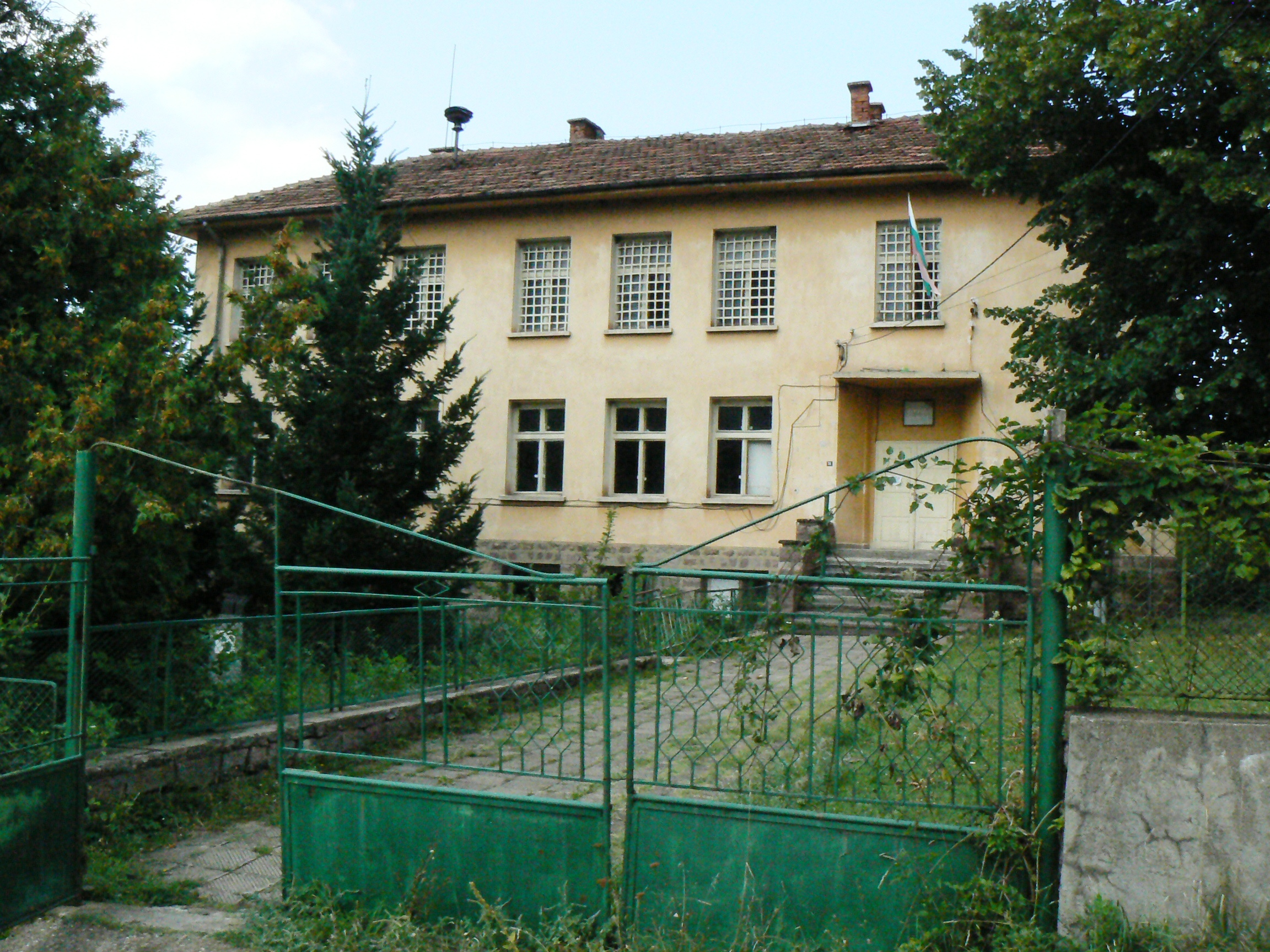
- The mayor's office in village Dolna Bela Rechka, Bulgaria

- Location within Bulgaria
- Coordinates: 43.1942°N 23.3417°E
- Country: Bulgaria
- Province: Montana Province
- Municipality: Varshets
- Time zone: UTC+2 (EET)
  - Summer (DST): UTC+3 (EEST)

Dolna Bela Rechka is a village in Varshets Municipality, Montana Province, northwestern Bulgaria.
