= Nikolovo, Montana Province =

Nikolovo Николово
- Village
- Location within Bulgaria
- Coordinates: 43.4200°N 23.2744°E
- Country: Bulgaria
- Province: Montana Province
- Municipality: Montana
- Time zone: UTC+2 (EET)
  - Summer (DST): UTC+3 (EEST)

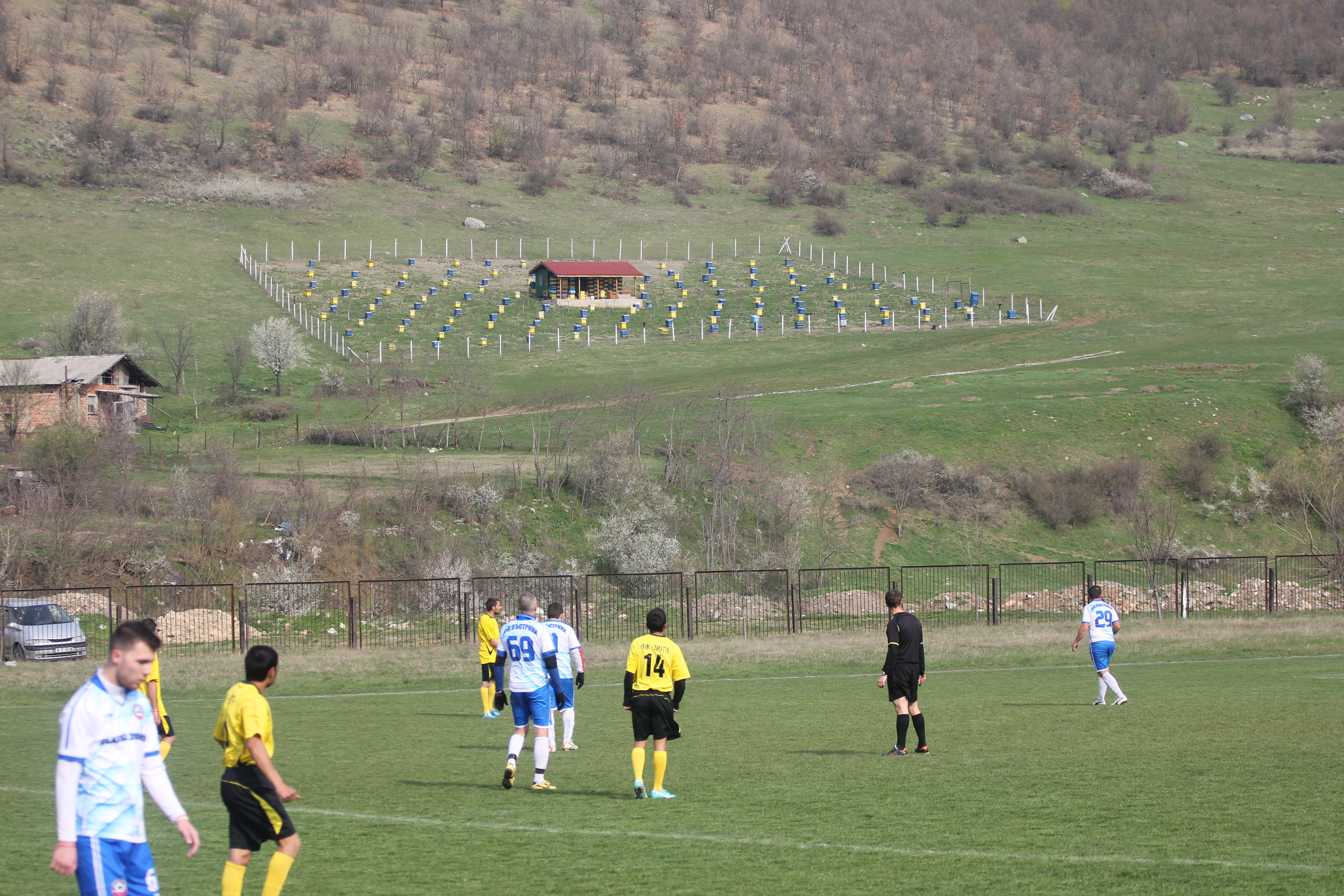

Nikolovo is a village in Montana Municipality, Montana Province, northwestern Bulgaria.
