= Montana Province =

Province in northwestern Bulgaria

Coordinates: 43°36′N 23°11′E

Montana Province Област Монтана
- Province
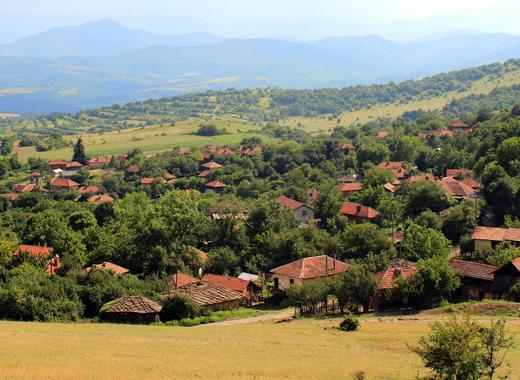
- Kamenna Riksa

- Flag

- Location of Montana Province in Bulgaria
- Country: Bulgaria
- Capital: Montana
- Municipalities: 11

Government
  - Governor: Rosen Belchev

Area
  - Total: 3,635.5 km^{2} (1,403.7 sq mi)

Population (Census February 2011)
  - Total: 148,098
  - Density: 40.737/km^{2} (105.51/sq mi)
- Time zone: UTC+2 (EET)
  - Summer (DST): UTC+3 (EEST)
- License plate: M
- Website: montanaoblast.egov.bg

Montana Province (Bulgarian: Област Монтана, transliterated: Oblast Montana) is a province in northwestern Bulgaria, bordering Serbia in the southwest and Romania in the north. It spreads its area between the Danube river and the Balkan Mountains. As of February 2011, the province had a population of 148,098, on territory of 3,635.5 km^{2} (1,403.7 sq mi). It was named after its administrative centre the city of Montana.

== Municipalities ==
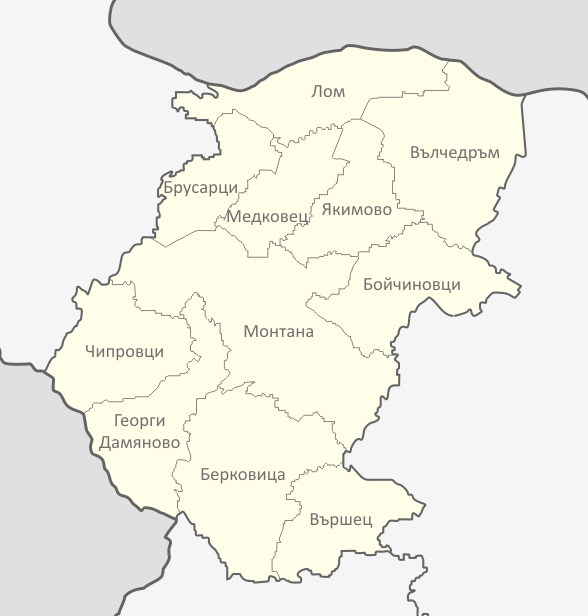
Municipalities in Montana province

The Montana province (Област, oblast) contains 11 municipalities (singular: община, obshtina - plural: Общини, obshtini). The following table shows the names of each municipality in English and in Cyrillic, the main town (in bold) or village, and the population as of 2011.

Municipality	Cyrillic	Pop.	Town/Village	Pop.
Berkovitsa	Берковица	19,587	**Berkovitsa**	14,124
Boychinovtsi	Бойчиновци	9,611	**Boychinovtsi**	1,588
Brusartsi	Брусарци	5,140	**Brusartsi**	1,277
Chiprovtsi	Чипровци	3,773	**Chiprovtsi**	1,937
Georgi Damyanovo	Георги Дамяново	2,867	Georgi Damyanovo	494
Lom	Лом	31,064	**Lom**	25,321
Medkovets	Медковец	4,103	Medkovets	1,866
Montana	Монтана	57,064	**Montana**	46,574
Valchedram	Вълчедръм	9,988	**Valchedram**	3,748
Varshets	Вършец	8,424	**Varshets**	6,439
Yakimovo	Якимово	4,481	Yakimovo	1,711

== Demographics ==
Historical population
Year	Pop.	±%
1946	242,073	—
1956	243,431	+0.6%
1965	242,841	−0.2%
1975	236,903	−2.4%
1985	223,415	−5.7%
1992	208,198	−6.8%
2001	182,258	−12.5%
2011	148,098	−18.7%
2021	119,950	−19.0%
Source: pop-stat.mashke.org

The Montana province had a population of 148,098 according to a 2011 census, of which 49.2% were male and 50.8% were female.

As of the end of 2009, the population of the province, announced by the Bulgarian National Statistical Institute, numbered 155,899 of which 30.5% are inhabitants aged over 60 years.

=== Ethnic groups ===
Ethnic groups in Montana Province (2011 census)
Ethnic group	Percentage
Bulgarians	86.3%
Romani	12.7%
others and indefinable	0.9%

Total population (2011 census): 148 098

Ethnic groups (2011 census): Identified themselves: 143 467 persons:

- Bulgarians: 123 820 (86,31%)
- Romani: 18 228 (12,71%)
- Others and indefinable: 1 248 (0,87%)

In the 2001 census, 181,175 people of the population of 182,258 of Montana Province identified themselves as belonging to one of the following ethnic groups (with percentage of total population):

Ethnic group	Population	Percentage
Bulgarians	157,507	86.42%
Romani	22,784	12.501%
Russians	272	0.149%
Turkish	235	0.129%
Armenian	19	0.01%
Vlachs (Aromanians, Romanians, Romanian-speaking Boyash)	19	0.01%
Macedonian	16	0.009%
Greeks	24	0.013%
Ukrainians	46	0.025%
Jews	3	0.002%
Other	250	0.137%

=== Language ===
In the 2001 census, 181,208 people of the population of 182,258 of Montana Province identified one of the following as their mother tongue (with percentage of total population): 160,494 Bulgarian (88.1%), 19,849 Romani (10.9%), 220 Turkish (0.1%), and 645 other (0.4%).

=== Religion ===
Religions in Montana Province (2011 census)
Religious group	Percentage
Orthodox Christian	73.9%
Irreligious	23.6%
Protestant Christian	2.0%
Roman Catholic Christian	0.3%
Muslim	0.1%
others	0.1%

In the 2011 census, 136,175 people of the population of 148,098 of Montana Province identified one of the following as their religion:

Census 2011
religious adherence	population	%
Orthodox Christians	100,571	73.86%
Protestants	2,740	2.01%
Roman Catholics	438	0.32%
Muslims	94	0.07%
Other	163	0.12%
Religion not mentioned	17,323	12,72%
Religion none	14,842	10,9%
total	148,098	100%

In the 2001 census, 172,358 people of the population of 182,258 of Montana Province identified one of the following as their religion:

Census 2001
religious adherence	population	%
Orthodox Christians	168,171	92.27%
Protestants	3,680	2.02%
Muslims	283	0.16%
Roman Catholics	121	0.07%
Other	864	0.47%
Religion not mentioned	9,139	5.01%
total	182,258	100%

== Towns and villages ==
The place names in bold have the status of town (in Bulgarian: град, transliterated as grad). Other localities have the status of village (in Bulgarian: село, transliterated as selo). The names of localities are transliterated in Latin alphabet, followed in parentheses by the original name in Bulgarian Cyrillic alphabet which links to the corresponding Bulgarian Wikipedia article).

=== Berkovitsa (Берковица) ===
The Berkovitsa municipality has one town (in bold) and 19 villages:

- Balyuvitsa (Балювица)
- Barzia (Бързия)
- **Berkovitsa** (Берковица)
- Bistrilitsa (Бистрилица)
- Bokilovtsi (Бокиловци)
- Borovtsi (Боровци)
- Gaganitsa (Гаганица)
- Komarevo (Комарево)
- Kostentsi (Костенци)
- Kotenovtsi (Котеновци)
- Leskovets (Лесковец)
- Mezdreya (Мездрея)
- Parlichevo (Пърличево)
- Pesochnitsa (Песочница)
- Rashovitsa (Рашовица)
- Slatina (Слатина)
- Chereshovitsa (Черешовица)
- Tsvetkova bara (Цветкова бара)
- Yagodovo (Ягодово)
- Zamfirovo (Замфирово)

=== Boychinovtsi (Бойчиновци) ===
The Boychinovtsi municipality has one town (in bold) and 12 villages:

- Beli breg (Бели брег)
- Beli brod (Бели брод)
- **Boychinovtsi** (Бойчиновци)
- Erden (Ерден)
- Gromshin (Громшин)
- Kobilyak (Кобиляк)
- Lehchevo (Лехчево)
- Madan (Мадан)
- Marchevo (Мърчево)
- Ohrid (Охрид)
- Palilula (Палилула)
- Portitovtsi (Портитовци)
- Vladimirovo (Владимирово)

=== Brusartsi (Брусарци) ===
The Brusartsi municipality has one town (in bold) and nine villages:

- Bukovets (Буковец)
- **Brusartsi** (Брусарци)
- Dabova mahala (Дъбова махала)
- Dondukovo (Дондуково)
- Kiselevo (Киселево)
- Knyazheva mahala (Княжева махала)
- Kriva bara (Крива бара)
- Odorovtsi (Одоровци)
- Smirnenski (Смирненски)
- Vasilovtsi (Василовци)

=== Chiprovtsi (Чипровци) ===
The Chiprovtsi municipality has one town (in bold) and nine villages:

- Belimel (Белимел)
- Chelyustnitsa (Челюстница)
- **Chiprovtsi** (Чипровци)
- Gorna Kovachitsa (Горна Ковачица)
- Gorna Luka (Горна Лука)
- Martinovo (Мартиново)
- Mitrovtsi (Митровци)
- Prevala (Превала)
- Ravna (Равна)
- Zhelezna (Железна)

=== Georgi Damyanovo (Георги Дамяново) ===
The Georgi Damyanovo municipality has 13 villages:

- Chemish (Чемиш)
- Dalgi del (Дълги дел)
- Diva Slatina (Дива Слатина)
- Elovitsa (Еловица)
- Gavril Genovo (Гаврил Геново)
- Georgi Damyanovo (Георги Дамяново)
- Glavanovtsi (Главановци)
- Govezhda (Говежда)
- Kamenna Riksa (Каменна Рикса)
- Kopilovtsi (Копиловци)
- Melyane (Меляне)
- Pomezhdin (Помеждин)
- Vidlitsa (Видлица)

=== Lom (Лом) ===
The Lom municipality has one town (in bold) and nine villages:

- Dobri dol (Добри дол)
- Dolno Linevo (Долно Линево)
- Kovachitsa (Ковачица)
- **Lom** (Лом)
- Orsoya (Орсоя)
- Slivata (Сливата)
- Staliyska mahala (Сталийска махала)
- Stanevo (Станево)
- Traykovo (Трайково)
- Zamfir (Замфир)

=== Medkovets (Медковец) ===
The Medkovets municipality has five villages:

- Asparuhovo (Аспарухово)
- Medkovets (Медковец)
- Pishurka (Пишурка)
- Rasovo (Расово)
- Slivovik (Сливовик)

=== Montana (Монтана) ===
The Montana municipality has one town (in bold) and 23 villages:

- Belotintsi (Белотинци)
- Bezdenitsa (Безденица)
- Blagovo (Благово)
- Doktor Yosifovo (Доктор Йосифово)
- Dolna Riksa (Долна Рикса)
- Dolna Verenitsa (Долна Вереница)
- Dolno Belotintsi (Долно Белотинци)
- Gabrovnitsa (Габровница)
- Gorna Verenitsa (Горна Вереница)
- Gorno Tserovene (Горно Церовене)
- Klisuritsa (Клисурица)
- Krapchene (Крапчене)
- Lipen (Липен)
- **Montana** (Монтана)
- Nikolovo (Николово)
- Slavotin (Славотин)
- Smolyanovtsi (Смоляновци)
- Stubel (Стубел)
- Studeno buche (Студено буче)
- Sumer (Сумер)
- Trifonovo (Трифоново)
- Vinište (Винище)
- Virove (Вирове)
- Voynitsi (Войници)

=== Valchedram (Вълчедръм) ===
The Valchedram municipality has one town (in bold) and ten villages:

- Botevo (Ботево)
- Buzovets (Бъзовец)
- Cherni vrakh (Черни връх)
- Dolni Tsibar (Долни Цибър)
- Gorni Tsibar (Горни Цибър)
- Ignatovo (Игнатово)
- Mokresh (Мокреш)
- Razgrad (Разград)
- Septemvriytsi (Септемврийци)
- **Valchedram** (Вълчедръм)
- Zlatiya (Златия)

=== Varshets (Вършец) ===
The Varshets municipality has one town (in bold), eight villages and one monastery (which has official status as a locality):

- Cherkaski (Черкаски)
- Dolna Bela Rechka (Долна Бела речка)
- Dolno Ozirovo (Долно Озирово)
- Draganitsa (Драганица)
- Klisurski Monastery (Клисурски манастир)
- Gorna Bela Rechka (Горна Бела речка)
- Gorno Ozirovo (Горно Озирово)
- Spanchevtsi (Спанчевци)
- Stoyanovo (Стояново)
- **Varshets** (Вършец)

=== Yakimovo (Якимово) ===
The Yakimovo municipality has four villages:

- Dalgodeltsi (Дългоделци)
- Dolno Tserovene (Долно Церовене)
- Komoshtitsa (Комощица)
- Yakimovo (Якимово)

== See also ==
- Provinces of Bulgaria
- Municipalities of Bulgaria
- List of cities and towns in Bulgaria
- List of towns and villages in Montana Province
