= Montana Municipality =

Montana Municipality Община Монтана
- Municipality
- Location within Bulgaria
- Coordinates: 43°25′N 23°14′E
- Country: Bulgaria
- Province: Montana
- Municipality: Montana

Area
  - Total: 675.72 km^{2} (260.90 sq mi)

Population (1-Feb-2011)
  - Total: 53,856
  - Density: 79.702/km^{2} (206.43/sq mi)
- Time zone: UTC+2 (EET)
  - Summer (DST): UTC+3 (EEST)
- Website: www.montana.bg

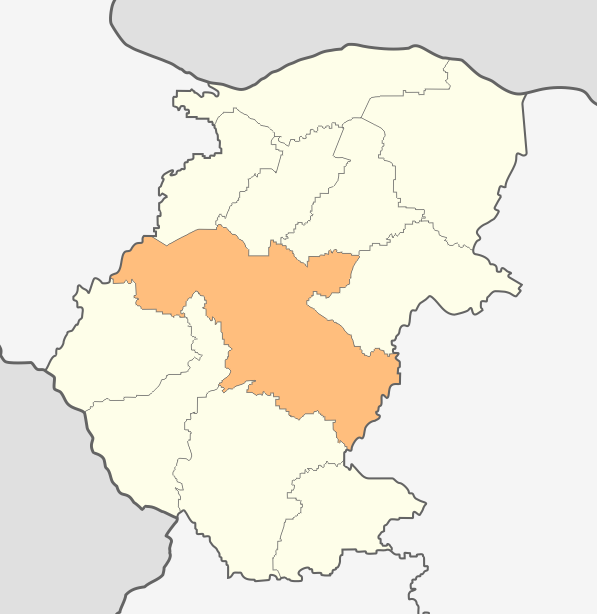
Montana municipality within Montana Province

Montana Municipality is a municipality in Montana Province, Bulgaria. It includes the city of Montana and a number of villages.

== Demography ==
=== Religion ===
According to the latest Bulgarian census of 2011, the religious composition, among those who answered the optional question on religious identification, was the following:

Religious composition of Montana Municipality
Orthodox Christianity	80.0%
Catholicism	0.3%
Protestantism	1.1%
Islam	0.1%
No religion	10.6%
Prefer not to answer, others and indefinable	7.9%
