= List of villages in Vratsa Province =

This is a list of villages in Vratsa Province, Bulgaria.

- Banitsa
- Bardarski Geran
- Borovan
- Chelopek
- Chiren
- Dolna Kremena
- Dobrolevo
- Eliseyna
- Galatin
- Gradeshnitsa
- Hayredin
- Kriva Bara
- Mihaylovo
- Ochindol
- Rogozen
- Ruska Bela
- Saraevo
- Staro Selo
- Tipchenitsa
- Virovsko
- Voyvodovo

== See also ==
- List of villages in Bulgaria
