= II-15 road (Bulgaria) =

Road in Bulgaria

Republic Road I-15
- Републикански път I-15

Route information
- Length: 78.2 km (48.6 mi)

Major junctions
- From: Km 144.1 of I-1, Vratsa
- To: Km 120.4 of II-11, Oryahovo

Location
- Country: Bulgaria
- Towns: Vratsa, Mizia, Oryahovo

Highway system
- Highways in Bulgaria

Republican Road II-15 (Bulgarian: Републикански път II-15) is a 2nd class road in northwestern Bulgaria, running in general direction south–north entirely through the territory of Vratsa Province. Its length is 78.2 km.

== Route description ==
The road starts at Km 144.1 of the first class I-1 road in the center of the city of Vratsa, bypasses the Veslets ridge from the west and the Milin Kamak ridge from the east and heads north through the western Danubian Plain. It passes through the villages of Mramoren, Banitsa and Borovan, where it intersects with the second class II-13 road, and continues through Altimir, Lipnitsa, Krushovitsa and Voyvodovo, crosses the river Skat, and reaches the town of Mizia. From there the road follows the lower course of the Ogosta and the rights bank of the Danube until the town of Oryahovo, where it reaches its terminus at Km 120.4 of the second class II-11 road.
