= II-13 road (Bulgaria) =

Road in Bulgaria

Republic Road I-13
- Републикански път I-13

Route information
- Length: 105.3 km (65.4 mi)

Major junctions
- From: Km 114.4 of I-1, Krapchene
- To: Km 101.0 of I-3, Dolni Dabnik

Location
- Country: Bulgaria
- Towns: Byala Slatina, Knezha, Iskar, Dolni Dabnik

Highway system
- Highways in Bulgaria

Republican Road II-13 (Bulgarian: Републикански път II-13) is a 2nd class road in northwestern Bulgaria, running in general direction west–east through the territory of Montana, Vratsa and Pleven Provinces. Its length is 105.5 km.

== Route description ==
The road starts at Km 114.4 of the first class I-1 road in the village of Krapchene in Montana Province just east of the provincial center Montana and heads east through the western Danubian Plain. It passes through the villages of Stubel and Lipen, enters Vratsa Procince, crosses the river Botunya, a left tributary of the Ogosta and reaches the town of Krivodol. The road then runs through the villages of Osen, Devene and Borovan, where it intersects with the second class II-15 road. It then crosses the town of Byala Slatina and the river Skat, and enters Pleven Province. There it passes through the town of Knezha, crosses the river Iskar, runs through the town of Iskar and reaches its terminus at Km 101.0 of the first class I-3 road east of the town of Dolni Dabnik.
