= II-11 road (Bulgaria) =

Road in Bulgaria

Republic Road I-11
- Републикански път I-11

Route information
- Length: 213.3 km (132.5 mi)

Major junctions
- From: Km 19.7 of I-1 near Dunavtsi
- To: Km 40.9 of II-34 near Cherkovitsa

Location
- Country: Bulgaria
- Towns: Lom, Kozloduy, Mizia, Oryahovo, Gulyantsi

Highway system
- Highways in Bulgaria

Republican Road II-11 (Bulgarian: Републикански път II-11) is a second-class road in northern Bulgaria spanning half of the Danube border with Romania in the Danubian Plain, running in general direction west–east through the territory of Vidin, Montana, Vratsa and Pleven Provinces. Its length is 213.3 km.

== Route description ==
The road starts at Km 19.7 of the first class I-1 road southeast of the town of Dunavtsi in Vidin Province. It passes through the villages of Tsar Simeonovo and Botevo, crosses the river Archar and the homonymous village, and after the bridge over the Skomlya enters Montana Province. The road then runs through the villages of Dobri Dol, Slivata and Orsoya, and reaches the town of Lom, where the second class II-81 road branches off in southern direction. It crosses consecutively the river Lom, the village of Kovachitsa, the river Tsibritsa, the village of Gorni Tsibar and enters Vratsa Province.

There the II-11 passes through the town of Kozloduy, the Kozloduy Nuclear Power Plant, the villages of Harlets and Glozhene, crosses the Ogosta and reaches the town of Mizia, where it intersects with the second class II-15 road. The road then turns northeast, runs through the town of Oryahovo and the villages of Leskovets and Ostrov and enters Pleven Province. It passes through the village of Krushovene and past the village of Baykal, crosses the river Iskar and along the southern periphery of the Cherno Pole Plain, through the villages of Gigen and Brest, it reaches the town of Gulyantsi. It then passes over the river Vit and through the villages of Milkovitsa, Dolni Vit and Somovit and reaches the village of Cherkovitsa, where some 150 m after the bridge over the river Osam it connects with of the second class II-34 road at the latter's Km 40.9.
