= Botunya (river) =

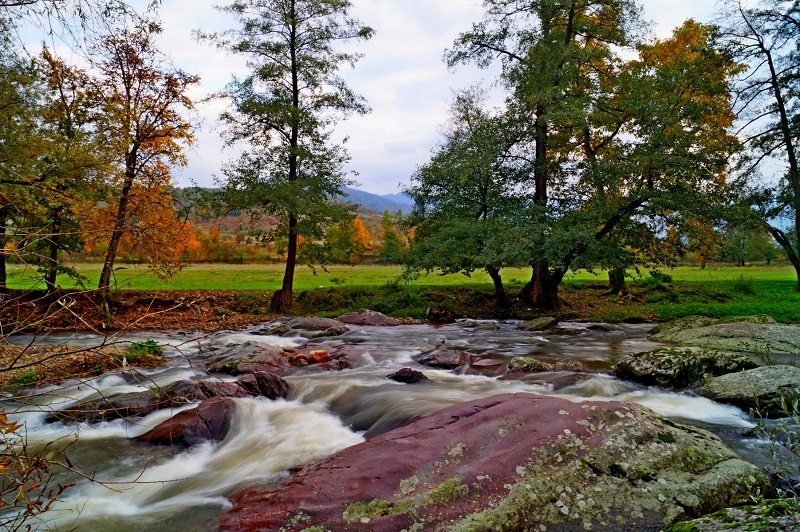

Location
- Country: Bulgaria

Physical characteristics
- Source
  - location: E of Todorini Kukli, Balkan Mountains
  - coordinates: 43°7′46.92″N 23°12′2.88″E
  - elevation: 1,550 m (5,090 ft)
- Mouth
  - location: Ogosta
  - coordinates: 43°28′51.96″N 23°21′14.04″E
  - elevation: 100 m (330 ft)
- Length: 69 km (43 mi)
- Basin size: 732 km^{2} (283 sq mi)

Basin features
- Progression: Ogosta→ Danube

The Botunya (Bulgarian: Ботуня) is a river in northwestern Bulgaria, a right tributary of the Ogosta, itself a right tributary of the Danube. With a length of 69 km, it is the Ogosta's second largest tributary after the Skat.

== Geography ==
The river takes its source under the name Stara reka at an altitude of 1,550 m east of the summit of Todorini Kukli (1,785 m) in the western part of the Balkan Mountains. It flows north in a deep forested valley until the town of Varshets and then crosses the Varshets Valley in direction northeast. The river bends northwards at the village of Dolno Ozirovo and downstream of Stoyanovo it again turns to the northeast, forming a wide valley covered with croplands. It enters Vratsa Province and turns northwest after receiving its largest tributary, the Varteshnitsa. In that section the river valley becomes asymmetrical. The river flows into the Ogosta at an altitude of 100 m about a kilometer northeast of the town of Boychinovtsi.

Its drainage basin covers a territory of 732 km^{2}, or 23.2% of the Ogosta's total. The high water is in April and the low water is in August. The average annual discharge at Stoyanovo is 3.9 m^{3}/s.

== Settlements and economy ==
The Botunya flows in Montana and Vratsa Provinces. There are two towns and ten villages along its course. In Montana Province are located Varshets (town), Dolno Ozirovo and Stoyanovo in Varshets Municipality, as well as Palilula and Ohrid in Boychinovtsi Municipality. In Vratsa Province are Botunya, Glavatsi, Kravoder, Pudria, Golemo Babino, Krivodol (town), Rakevo and Dobrusha, all of them in Krivodol Municipality.

A 6.5 km stretch of the third class III-162 road Lakatnik–Stoyanovo–Beli Izvor follows the river's left bank in its upper course. In the same section is also a 3.4 km stretch of the third class III-812 road Berkovitsa–Varshets. An 18.9 km section of the third class III-101 road Vratsa–Boychinovtsi–Glozhene runs parallel to its left bank between Krivodol and Boychinovsti.

In its upper course is situated the spa resort of Varshets. The waters is clear and the Botunya is a fishing destination, with species such as river trout, European chub, common barbel, common nase, Danube bleak, gudgeon, Prussian carp, etc. The river's waters are utilised for irrigation.
