= Skat (river) =

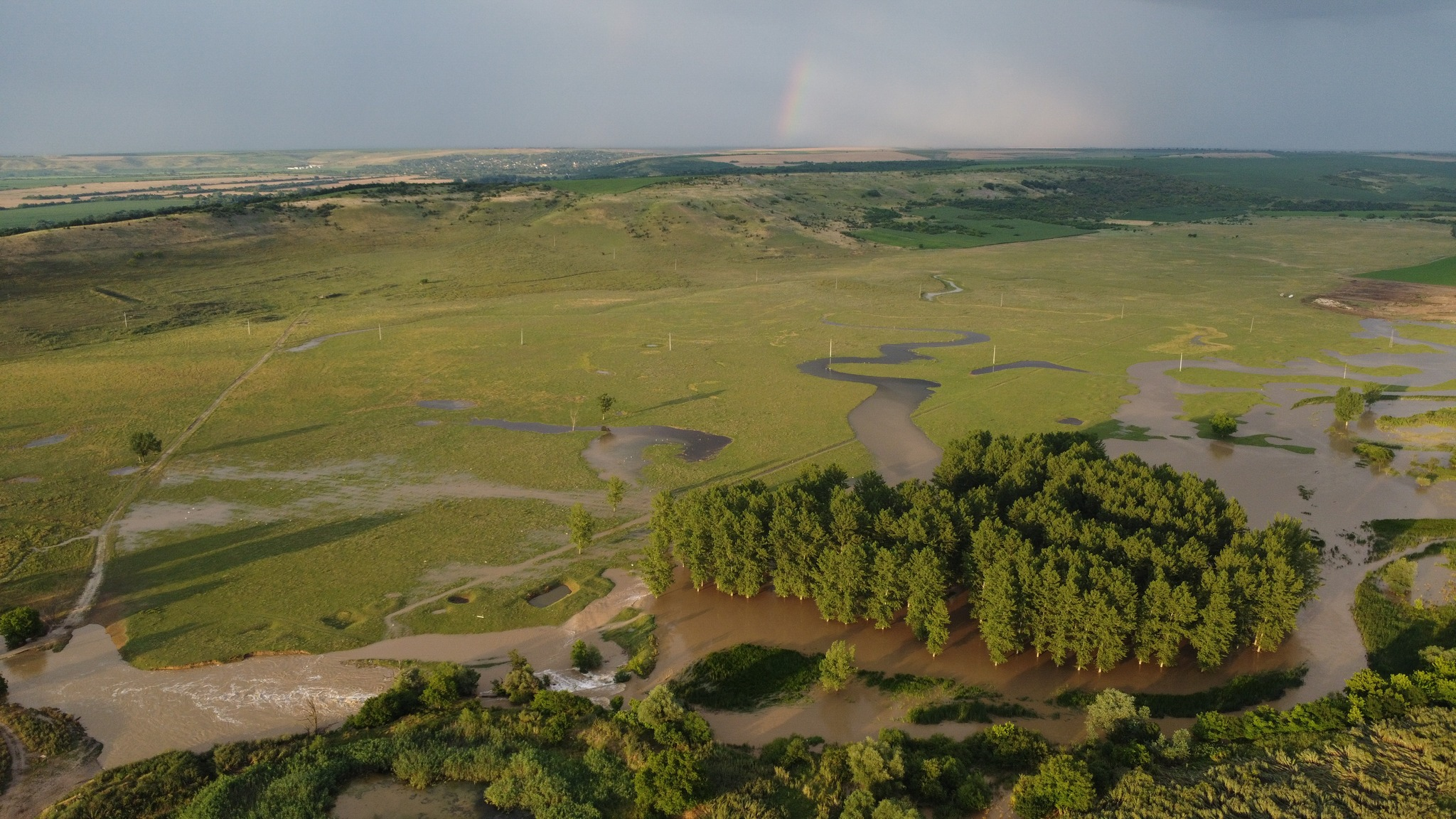

Location
- Country: Bulgaria

Physical characteristics
- Source
  - location: Veslets Ridge, fore-Balkan
  - coordinates: 43°14′44.16″N 23°36′52.92″E
  - elevation: 446 m (1,463 ft)
- Mouth
  - location: Ogosta
  - coordinates: 43°43′24.96″N 23°51′43.92″E
  - elevation: 29 m (95 ft)
- Length: 134 km (83 mi)
- Basin size: 1,074 km^{2} (415 sq mi)

Basin features
- Progression: Ogosta→ Danube

The Skat (Bulgarian: Скът, pronounced [ˈskɤt]; also transliterated Skǎt or Skut; Latin: Scitus) is a river in the western Danubian Plain of northern Bulgaria. With a length of 134 km, it is a right tributary of the Ogosta, itself a right tributary of the Danube.

== Geography ==
The Skat takes its source at an altitude of 556 m north of the summit of Manyashki Vrah (781 m) in the Veslets Ridge of the fore-Balkan. It initially flows east to the village of Gorno Peshtene and then turns north. The river then bypasses the Borovanska Mogila Hill (420 m) from the west and north through a short gorge and enters the Danubian Plain, where it flows in a wide asymmetric valley with steeper right banks. The Skat consecutively turns north at Barkachevo, northwest after Byala Slatina and north again at Altimir. Downstream from the latter the river gradient becomes very low and the Skar forms numerous meanders. It that section the river is 5–10 m wide with sandy bottom. It flows into the Ogosta at an altitude of 29 m some three kilometers from the latter's confluence with the Danube. The river used to flow directly in the Danube but its lowermost course was diverted during the construction of the Kozloduy Nuclear Power Plant.

Its drainage basin covers a territory of 1,074 km^{2}, or 34% of the Ogosta's total. The high water is in spring and early summer due to the snowmelt and the spring rains. The average annual discharge is 0.86 m^{3}/s at Nivyanin and 1.71 m^{3}/s at Mizia.

== Settlements and economy ==
The Skat flows entirely in Vratsa Province. There are two towns and 15 villages along its course — Gorno Peshtene, Golemo Peshtene, Malo Peshtene, Ohoden, Nivyanin, Komarevo, Barkachevo, Popitsa, Byala Slatina (town), Tarnava, Altimir, Galiche, Lipnitsa, Krushovitsa, Voyvodovo, Mizia (town) and Saraevo. The river's waters are utilised for irrigation.

There are several roads along the Skat valley, including a 23.8 km stretch of the second class II-15 road Vratsa–Oryahovo between Altimir and the river mouth, a 13.9 km section of the third class III-133 road Byala Slatina–Valchedram–Lom between Byala Slatina and Altimir, and an 8.6 km section of the third class III-134 road Byala Slatina–Gabare–Gorna Beshovitsa between Byala Slatina and Barkachevo.
