= Mihaylovo =

Mihaylovo Михайлово
- Location of Mihaylovo
- Coordinates: 43°34′28″N 23°35′56″E
- Country: Bulgaria
- Province (Oblast): Vratsa

Government
  - Mayor: Valeri Krumov
- Elevation: 78 m (256 ft)

Population (2009-03-15)
  - Total: 1,084
- Time zone: UTC+2 (EET)
  - Summer (DST): UTC+3 (EEST)
- Postal Code: 3355
- Area code: 09162

Mihaylovo (Bulgarian: Михайлово) is a village in Northwestern Bulgaria. It is located in Hayredin municipality, Vratsa Province.

== See also ==
- List of villages in Vratsa Province
