= Sarajevo (disambiguation) =

Sarajevo is the capital and largest city of Bosnia and Herzegovina.

Sarajevo may also refer to:

- Istočno Sarajevo, city in Bosnia and Herzegovina
- Sarajevo, song by the K's

== Film ==
- Sarajevo (1940 French film), a 1940 French film directed by Max Ophüls
- Sarajevo (1940 Hungarian film), a Hungarian film directed by Ákos Ráthonyi
- Sarajevo (1955 film), an Austrian film directed by Fritz Kortner
- Welcome to Sarajevo, a 1997 British film directed by Michael Winterbottom
- Sarajevo (2014 film), an Austrian film directed by Andreas Prochaska

== Sports ==
- Sarajevo 84, a commonly used name for the 1984 Winter Olympics.

== See also ==
- Sarayevo
- Saraevo
- Barajevo
