= Galovo =

Galovo may refer to:

- Galovo, Bulgaria, a village near Oryahovo
- Galovo, Croatia, an archeological site near Slavonski Brod
