= Petar Petrov (footballer, born 1961) =

Bulgarian footballer

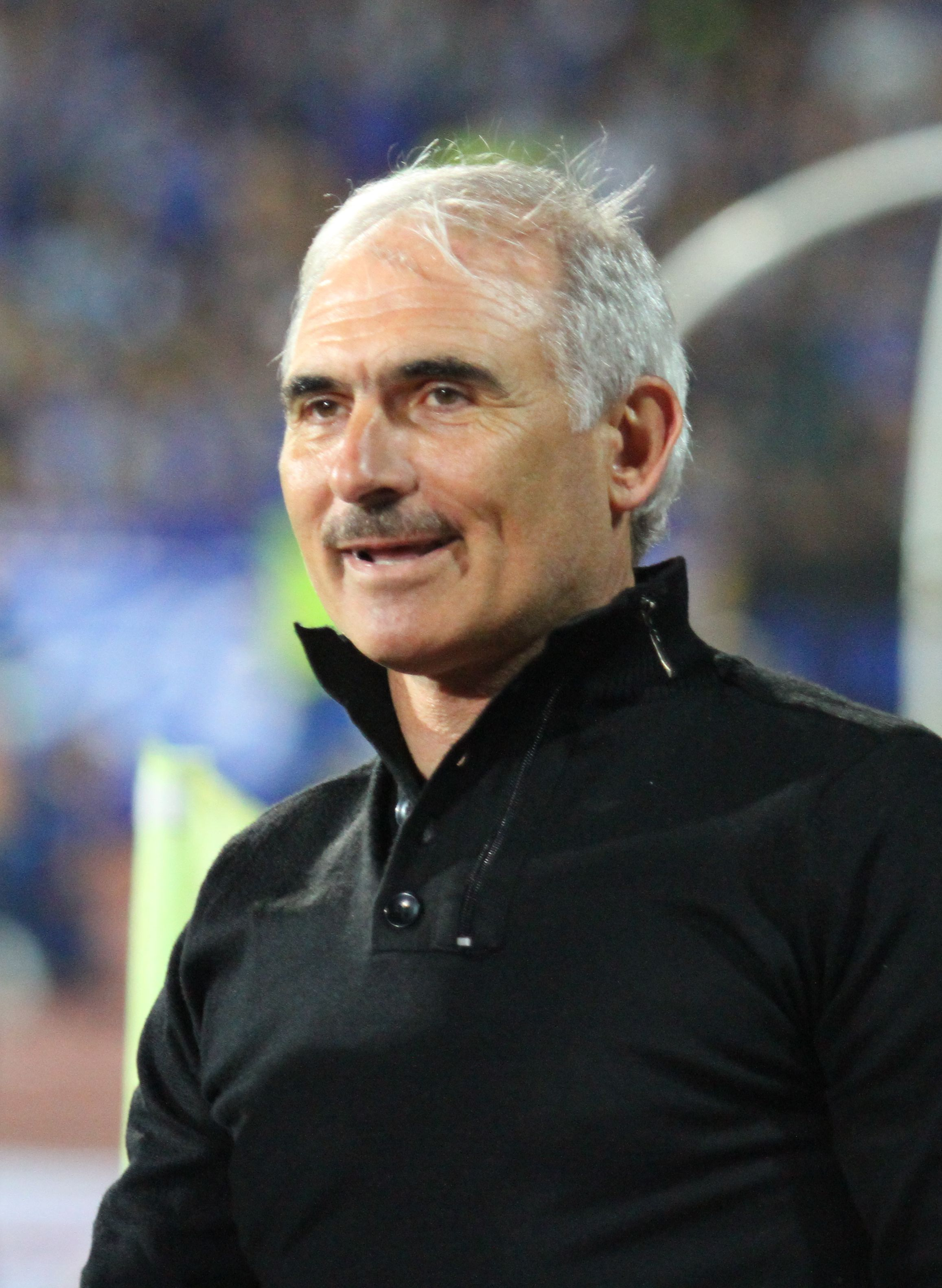

Personal information
- Full name: Petar Atanasov Petrov
- Date of birth: 20 February 1961 (age 65)
- Place of birth: Virovsko, Bulgaria
- Height: 1.83 m (6 ft 0 in)
- Position: Left back

Senior career*
Years	Team	Apps	(Gls)
1980–1989	Levski Sofia	205	(13)
1989–1993	Beira-Mar	100	(10)
1993–1994	Beroe Stara Zagora	8	(0)
1994–1997	Akademik Sofia		
Total		313	(23)

International career
1981–1987	Bulgaria	47	(0)
- * Club domestic league appearances and goals

Petar Atanasov Petrov (Bulgarian: Пeтъp Aтaнacoв Пeтpoв; born 20 February 1961) is a former Bulgarian footballer who played as a left back.

== Club career ==
Born in Virovsko, Petrov started playing for PFC Levski Sofia. During his spell with the club – renamed Vitosha Sofia in 1985 – he was first-choice in seven of nine seasons, winning three national championships and two Bulgarian Cups; he scored a career-best five goals in 29 games in 1984–85.

Petrov was allowed to leave the Iron Curtain nation in 1989, at the age of 28, and signed with Portuguese team S.C. Beira-Mar. After four years, always in the Primeira Liga, he returned to his homeland and joined PFC Beroe Stara Zagora, retiring subsequently.

== International career ==
Petrov gained 47 caps for Bulgaria in six years. He was part of the squad that competed at the 1986 FIFA World Cup, He didn't play in the opening game against Italy (1-1) but played in all the other matches for Bulgaria.
