= Glozhene, Vratsa Province =

Glozhene (Vratsa Province) Гложене
- Village
- Location of Glozhene
- Coordinates: 43°41′29.921″N 23°48′43.251″E
- Country: Bulgaria
- Province (Oblast): Vratsa
- Municipality: Kozloduy Municipality

Government
  - Mayor: Petko Petkov

Area
  - Total: 5,189 km^{2} (2,003 sq mi)
- Elevation: 59 m (194 ft)

Population
  - Total: 2 822
- Time zone: UTC+2 (EET)
  - Summer (DST): UTC+3 (EEST)
- Postal Code: 3327
- Area code: 09160
- Website: Official website

Glozhene (Bulgarian: Гложене [ˈɡɫɔʒɛnɛ]) is a village in Northwestern Bulgaria. It is located in the Kozloduy Municipality, Vratsa. It was previously known as Glazhene (Глажене [ˈɡɫaʒɛnɛ]).

== Geography ==
The land of the village is located in Northwestern Bulgaria and is a part of country's granary, known by the name "Zlatia", situated at about 58 m. altitude. It stands on the left bank of the Ogosta river, as with small exceptions the terrain is plain. It is at distance of about 13 km. from the municipal center of Kozloduy, of 67 km. from the regional center Vratza and of 180 km. from the capital Sofia. Adjacent settlements are the villages Harletz, Butan, Sofronievo and the city of Mizia. It is believed that the name of the village comes from the rife bush plant hawthorn.

== History ==
According to SRA Bogdan Nikolov (archeologist and local historian - author of the book "From Iskara do Ogosta") at the village center have been unearthed remains of an ancient village, dated XI until XIV century AD. As per various legends, it may be concluded, that Glozhene's first settlers came from the Balkan Mountains and the Prebalkan, looking for more secure livelihood in agriculture, cattle-breeding and fishing.

At the same time, according to Short Bulgarian Encyclopedia (1964), with its current name the village is mentioned in Turkish document from 1674. At the first census of the population of the Principality of Bulgaria (Knyazhestvo Bulgaria), dated 1 January 1881, the number of village residents is 1177. By 1962 it numbered 3696 residents. At the west part of the land is located one of the three historical trenches (deep ditches), originating from the Danube river at Kozloduy and continuing in Southeastern direction, which once outlined the borders of Asparuh Bulgaria. Here was located border Asparuh garrison and the place was long time before the cooperation of the land called "the trench".

When the Balkan war broke out in 1912, three residents from Glozhene volunteered in Macedonian-Adrianopolitan Volunteer Corps and from the documents, kept in the Central military archive, it is evident, that on the Volunteer Corps staff list are the names of: Kalaydzhiyski, Ivan, 25 y/o from Glozhene village (Oryahovo): 1st company of 5th Odrin battalion - (K - 37); Komshiyski, Iwan, 25 y/o, from Glozhene village (Oryahovo), 1st company of 5th Odrin battalion - (K - 307) - killed in action (KIA); Parvanov, Tosho (Tanuy), - 48 y/o from Glozhene village (Oryahovo), 3rd company and non-combatant company of the 5th Odrin battalion (K - 1448). In this respect, we have reasons to believe, that the Family names, by which the two Ivans are enlisted are not genuine, because:

- among the old and known Glozhene families (kins), mentioned in the book of SRA Bogdan Nikolov "From Iskara do Ogosta", the names of Kalaydzhiyski and Komshiyski are not present;

- at the beginning of the Balkan war, 1912, a general mobilization was declared, from which certainly evaded the so-called Ivan Komshiyski and probably Ivan Kalaydzhiyski as well. Facing military tribunal for desertion, the same decide to join Macedonian-Adrianopolitan Volunteer Corps, heading towards the south border of Bulgaria;

- the killed in fight with the Turkish army is certainly the volunteer Ivan Lazarov Ganov (with mother Petra and father Lazar Ganov Krastev) and the returned survived volunteers, Ivan and Tanuy report to his parents the place where their comrade was killed and buried. As a memory of Ivan Lazarov Ganov, there's a portrait of him in volunteer's uniform, which is kept in the home of his brother - Stankol Lazarov Ganov.

At the center of the village, a monument has been built, in the memory of the fallen, in the wars for independence of Bulgaria.

== Economy ==
The economy of the village is comprised by the two Labor Cooperative Farms (ТКЗС), one of which is in the northern part of the village and one is in its southern. After their unification, their long standing chairman is Stefan Georgiev Barchov. Their main livelihood is agriculture and stock-breeding. Also grown are wheat, corn, barley, as well as technical cultures such as sunflower and cotton.

In 1950 in the village women protests broke out against the mass collectivization of the agricultural production and cooperation of the fields and the inventory into Labor Cooperative Farms (ТКЗС).

Within the land of the village, an oil factory functions, which processes the sunflower seeds into oil, as well as two mills, one of which uses the water-flow of Ogosta river and the other one uses mazut as fuel, as the water mill is known as "Yonchovata vodenitza" and the mazut one - as "Goluyvata vodenitza".

Later on, a workshop for hemp processing was built, which the Glozhene residents call "The hemp factory", and even later on the area between village Bukyovtzi (currently the city of Mizia) and Glozhene was built "Paper-cellulose plant". Together, they create jobs and keep some of the residents from migration.

== Education ==
For beginning of the school education is deemed 1872, when for learning activities was used part of the church and later on, in 1894 was built the first school. By the beginning of the 20th century two elementary schools function, located respectively in its northern and southern part. The bear the names of Petko Slaveykov and Saints Cyril and Methodius. Also a lower secondary (primary) school functions, by the name of Hristo Botev, located in the central part of the village in which is studied until 7th grade. The primary school has its own Internet page.

== Culture ==
The culture of the village is defined by the activities and events, organized by the community center "Yakim Despotov", with chairman Violeta Marinova, which includes library with reading room, repetition and movie halls. During the '60s and the '70s of the past centuries, it has theatrical troupe, choir and dance ensemble, cinema and others.

In winter times, in the community center festive celebrations and other fun nights are held, featuring the community brass band, created under the influence of the distinctive musician and composer Diko Iliev. Not a single all-village community celebration or event, wedding or entertainment, does not take place without music.

During the second decade of this century, big popularity acquires the school brass band, to the community center, participating in many festivities and contests, for which it has been awarded with many distinctions.

== Sport ==
The sport in the village is generally characterized by the presence of a football team, which in the '60s and '70s of the past century successfully plays in "A" district group. At the same time, at various holidays (Saint Theodore's Day), horse races take place, as well as track and field competitions and other sports.

== Nature ==
The nature is characterized by the plain terrain and the greenery along the valley of Ogosta river, with the forest in the southern part of the land called "Branishteto", as well as with the additionally created poplar tree forest in the low northern part of the land. Part of the nature landmarks used to be "Starite lozia"(The Old Vineyard), located on a low hill, in the southeastern part of the land, as well as the other forest, in the same direction, sometimes called "Lugut".

== Climate ==
The climate is temperate continental, characterized by warm, often hot summers, as well as by snowy and cold winters. Ogosta river provides an opportunity for cooling in the summer heat, which is exactly where many of the children of the village learnt to swim.

== Religion ==
The predominant religion of the population is Christianity, which takes care the church "Sveta Troitza" (Holy Trinity).

== Administrative division ==
During different times the municipality has changed its territorial scope, as it was unified with the village Hurletz, after which it was unified with the village Bukyovtzi, which resulted in the establishment of the city of Mizia. Nowadays, it functions as an independent administrative unit, within Kozloduy municipality. Long-standing mayors, who contributed to the development of its infrastructure are Nikola Semkov, Petar Velkov and others. As of 2019 the mayor of the village is Petko Ivanov Petkov, who puts the effort for the maintenance of the infrastructure and to the further development of the traditions built in the past.
