= Bistreshky Monastery =

Medieval monastery in Vratsa Province, Bulgaria

Coordinates: 43.2°N 23.55°E

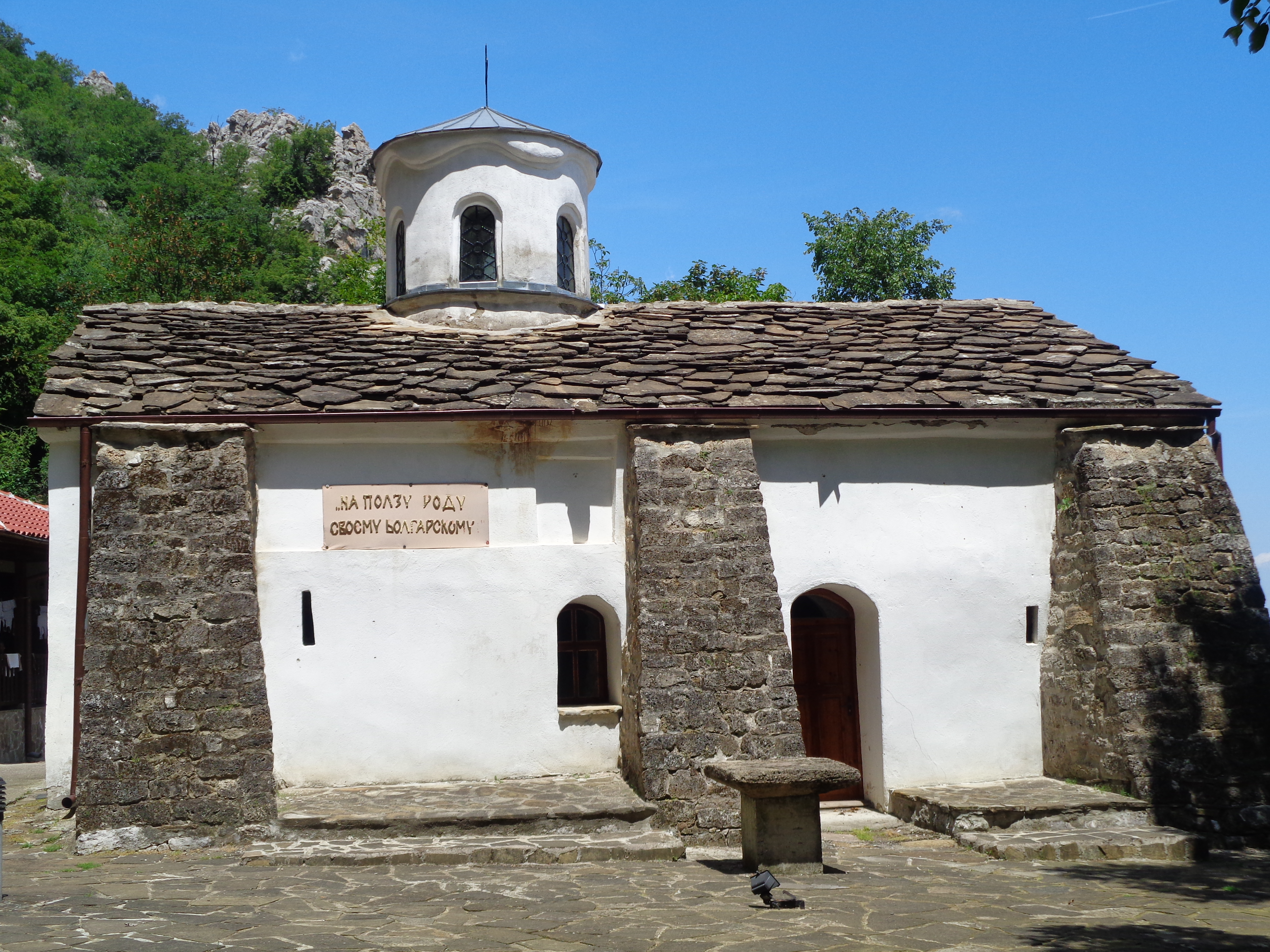
The church of the monastery of St. Ivan Pusti

Bistreshky Moastery or Monastery of Saint Ivan Kasinets (Bulgarian: Бистрешкият манастир „Свети Иван Касинец“) is medieval Bulgarian monastery located in Vratsa Province. Some of the frescoes in the church show that it was restored in the 16th century, but the establishment of the monastery dates back to the era of the Second Bulgarian Empire. There was a medieval fortress near the monastery—the fortress Kasina from the 12th to the 14th centuries. In 1822 the first printing workshop for icons in Bulgaria worked in the monastery.
