= Tipchenitsa =

Tipchenitsa Типченица
- Location of Tipchenitsa
- Coordinates: 43°04′N 23°43′E
- Country: Bulgaria
- Provinces (Oblast): Vratsa Province

Government
  - Mayor: Georgi Georgiev
- Elevation: 436 m (1,430 ft)

Population
  - Total: 437
- Time zone: UTC+2 (EET)
  - Summer (DST): UTC+3 (EEST)
- Postal Code: 3164
- Area code: 09124

Tipchenitsa (Bulgarian: Типченица) is a village located in Mezdra Municipality, Part of Bulgaria's Vratsa Province. It is located approximately 16 kilometers (10 miles) from the municipal town of Mezdra and 100 (62 miles) km from the Bulgarian capital Sofia.

== Geography ==
The village of Tipchenitsa is located in a mountain area at the Western part of Balkan Mountains.

== Climate ==
The climate is humid continental, similar to that of Sofia. The average annual temperature is about 11 °C (52 °F).

== Population ==
According to the 2011 census, the village has a population of 437 people, most of whom are ethnic Bulgarians. There is a small Roma Gypsy community.

== Tourism ==
The village is located in a rural region and there are not many attractions. The area is good for hiking with its nice flora and fauna. There is only one hotel in Tipchenitsa - a small family owned 3 star place located in the building of the old school.
