= Saraevo =

- Location of Saraevo
- Coordinates: 43°43′N 23°52′E
- Country: Bulgaria
- Provinces (Oblast): Vratsa

Government
  - Mayor: Violin Krushovenski
- Elevation: 159 m (522 ft)

Population (13.09.2005)
  - Total: 56
- Time zone: UTC+2 (EET)
  - Summer (DST): UTC+3 (EEST)
- Postal Code: 3333
- Area code: 09161

Saraevo (Bulgarian: Сараево) is a village in Northwestern Bulgaria, part of Miziya Municipality, Vratsa Province. It is located on Skat River, which discharges into Ogosta nearby, which in its turn discharges into the Danube not far away.
