= Marin Varbanov =

- Born: 20 September 1932; Oryachovo, Bulgaria
- Died: 22 August 1989 (aged 56); Beijing, China
- Resting place: Beijing, China
- Education: Academy of Arts, Sofia Bulgaria; Academy of Fine Arts, Beijing China
- Known for: Modern textile plastics
- Notable work: Structure in black (1977); Les orgues de Matignon collection George Heckly, president d'Art-Dialogue, etc
- Movement: Tapestry Modern textilе Textilе plastics

Marin (also Maryn) Varbanov (Марин Върбанов; 20 September 1932 – 22 July 1989) was born in Oryachovo, Bulgaria, and was a Bulgarian painter and modern tapestriest.
