= Ogosta Reservoir =

Lake in Bulgaria

Ogosta Lake Язовир Огоста
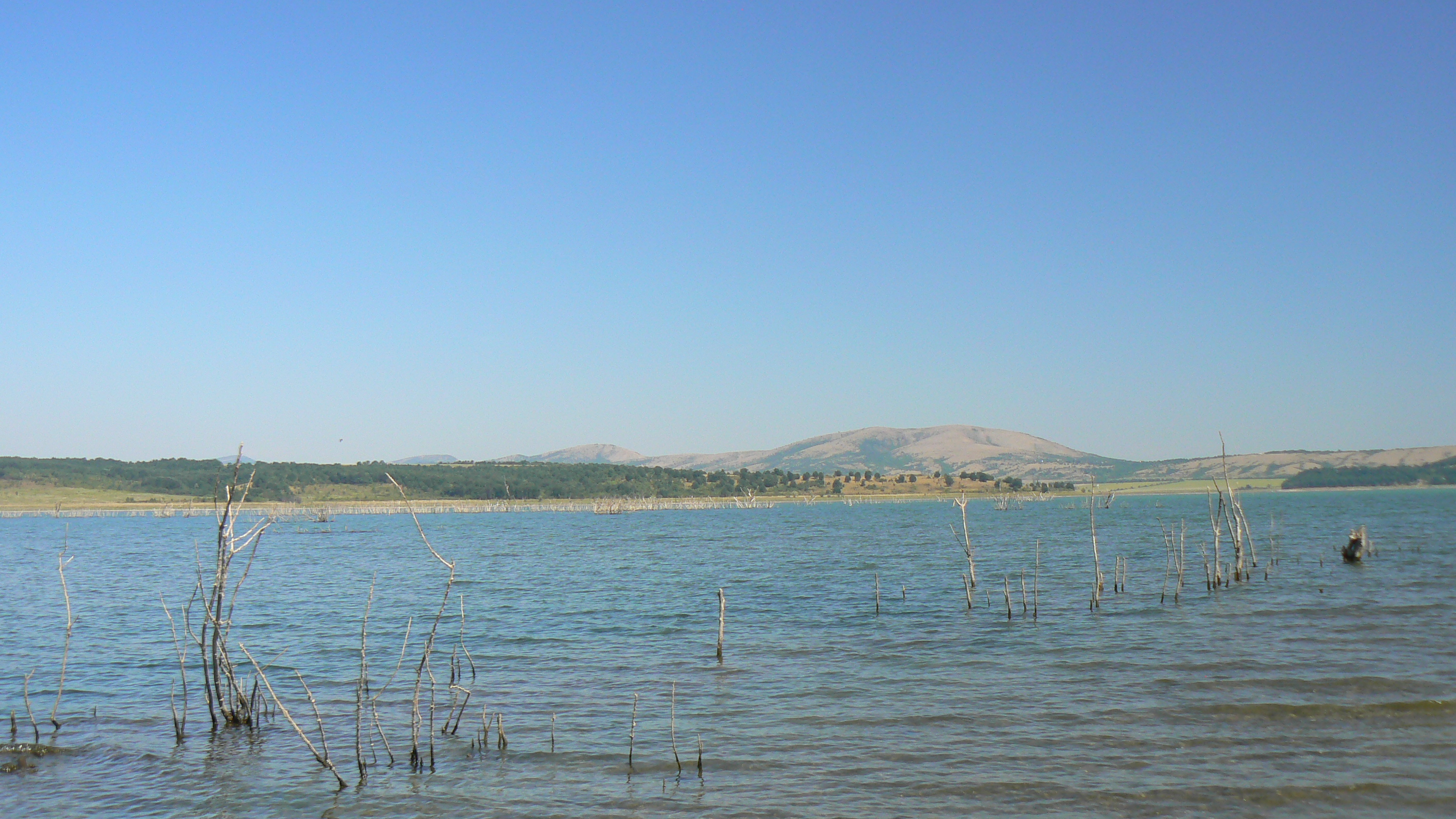

- Location within Bulgaria
- Location: Montana
- Coordinates: 43°22′31″N 23°10′56″E
- Type: reservoir
- Primary inflows: Ogosta, Burzia, and Zlatitsa rivers
- Catchment area: 947 km^{2} (366 sq mi)
- Basin countries: Bulgaria
- Max. length: 6.26 km (3.89 mi) (from map)
- Max. width: 2.6 km (1.6 mi) (from map)
- Surface area: 2,360 ha (5,800 acres)
- Water volume: 384 hm^{3} (311,000 acre⋅ft)
- Surface elevation: 186 m (610 ft)

Ogosta (Bulgarian: Язовир Огоста) is a lake and reservoir in the north-west of Bulgaria. The second largest artificial lake in Bulgaria (after the Iskar Reservoir), and also in the wider Balkan Peninsula, it is one of the biggest in Europe.

Collecting the waters of the rivers Ogosta, Burzia, and Zlatitsa, the lake begins only 600 meters to the south-west of the edge of Montana city, and its surface is some 60 meters above the ground level of the city. Its water catchment area covers 948 km,^{2} and the area of the lake itself is 24 hectares. The average water volume is 384 Mm,^{3} while the maximum volume is 506Mm^{3}.

According to the Cambridge Ancient History, the name "Ogosta" may represent the Latin name Augusta.

The construction of the dam which created the lake took twenty years and was completed in 1986. For the project two villages were flooded, Jivovtsi and Kalimanitsa, and their inhabitants were found new homes in nearby Berkovitsa and Montana.

One purpose of the new reservoir was to irrigate large areas of agricultural land lying between Montana and Zlatia, near Lom, but by 1989 only half of the necessary infrastructure of water-pipes had been laid down, and the irrigation scheme was never completed. Now the waters of the lake are used instead to generate electricity, and two hydro-electric power-stations called “Kosharnik” and “Ogosta” have been built below the dam.

In 1999 the lake was designated for commercial fishing and it now holds a wide variety of fish, including carp, carassius, rudd, carp bream, perch, nase, barbus and others.
