= Czechs and Slovaks in Bulgaria =

Ethnic minority

Czechs and Slovaks in Bulgaria Češi a Slováci v Bulharsku Česi a Slováci v Bulharsku Чехи и Словаци в България
Total population
- 400 (2011)

Regions with significant populations
- Mandritsa, Sofia

Languages
- Czech, Slovak, Bulgarian

Religion
- Irreligion (majority) · Roman Catholic (minority)

Czechs (Bulgarian: чехи, chehi) and Slovaks (Bulgarian: словаци, slovatsi) are minority ethnic groups in Bulgaria (Czech and Slovak: Bulharsko). According to the 2001 census, Czechs number only 316 and the number of Slovaks is even smaller, but historically, their population has been considerably larger

== History ==
Following the Liberation of Bulgaria in 1878, a large number of Czechs and Slovaks arrived in the country from Austria-Hungary to foster its cultural and economic development. These included many intellectuals and entrepreneurs, such as the historian Konstantin Josef Jireček (Minister of Education 1881–1882), the painters Ivan Mrkvička and Jaroslav Věšín, the archaeologists Karel Škorpil and Hermann Škorpil, the engineer and entrepreneur Jiří Prošek and the Prošek family (who built Lavov most and Orlov most and founded the Sofia brewery), Václav Dobruský (first director of the National Archaeological Museum), the brewer Franz Milde (founder of the Shumen brewery), the architects Josef Schnitter (long-time chief architect of Plovdiv), Antonín Kolář (first chief architect of Sofia) and Lubor Bajer (who designed Stara Zagora's modern street network), and many others.

Besides urban emigration, the Law for the settlement of the desolated lands of 1880 attracted many ethnic Czech and Slovak colonists, mostly Protestants from the regions of the Romanian Banat (particularly Sfânta Elena and Nădlac) and modern Vojvodina, Serbia. The most notable site of the rural Czech colony in Bulgaria was the village of Voyvodovo, Vratsa Province, founded by Czech colonists in 1900 and reaching a population of 800 (of which over 600 Czechs, the rest Slovaks, Banat Bulgarians and Banat Swabians) in the 1930s. Other places where Czechs and Slovaks settled were the town of Gorna Oryahovitsa and the villages of Belintsi and Podayva, Razgrad Province, with a significant Slovak community also present in Pleven Province (Gorna Mitropolia, Podem, Brashlyanitsa). A member of Bulgaria's Slovak community, Ďuro Mikoláš of Gorna Mitropolia, was an orderly (batman) to Tsar Ferdinand I of Bulgaria.

In Podem (old name Martvitsa or Slovak Mŕtvica), for example, the Slovaks arrived in 1884 from the southern Kingdom of Hungary and numbered 210 by 1910; they lived in a separate Slovak neighbourhood with characteristic Slovak houses (white, elongated and with steep roofs) and built their Evangelical Lutheran church in 1934.

Between 1948 and 1950, over 2,000 Czechs and Slovaks from Sofia and the aforementioned localities responded to the call of the government of Czechoslovakia and returned to their native land to populate areas deserted in World War II. Only around 5% of their peak number, mostly people who had married local Bulgarians, remained.

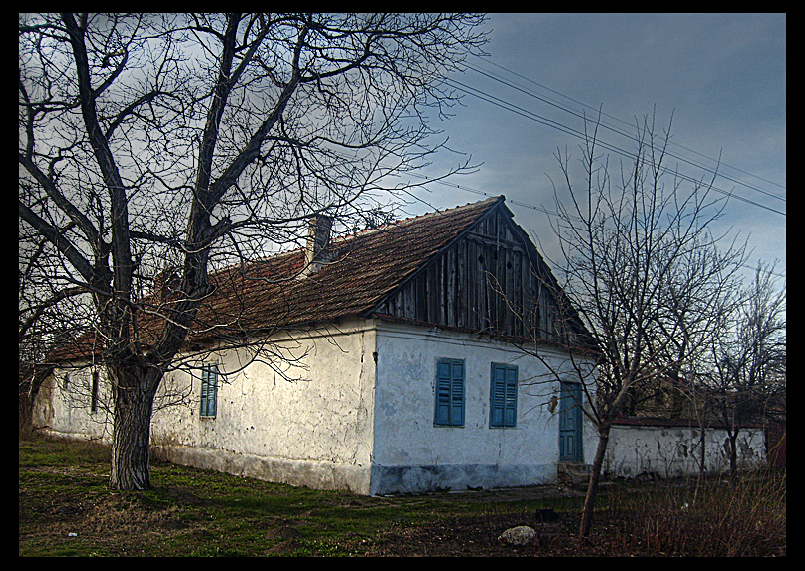
Old Czech house in Voyvodovo, Vratsa Province

== See also ==
- Bulgaria–Czech Republic relations
- Bulgaria–Slovakia relations
- Ethnic groups in Bulgaria
- Czech diaspora
- Slovak diaspora

== Sources ==
- Пенчев, Владимир (2003). "Чешките темели на следосвобожденска България". Европа 2001 (in Bulgarian) (5): 14.
- Пржибил, Мирослав (2003). "110 години чешка и словашка общност в България". Европа 2001 (in Bulgarian) (5): 19.
- Пенчев, Владимир (2001). Паралакс в огледалото или за мигрантските общности в чуждоезична среда (чехи и словаци в България, българи в Чехия) (in Bulgarian). София: Херон Прес. ISBN 978-954-580-110-5.
- Svoboda, Michal. "BULBA 2006" (in Czech). Antropoweb. Archived from the original on 6 June 2007.
- Budilová, Lenka (August 2006). "Dějiny Vojvodova: Vesnice Čechů a Slováků v Bulharsku" (in Czech). Archived from the original on 7 October 2007.
- Blanár, Vincent (1997). "Jazyk slovenskej menšiny v Bulharsku zo sociolingvistického hl'adiska". Slovenčina na konci 20. storočia, jej normi a perspektívy (PDF) (in Slovak). Bratislava: Vydatel'stvo slovenskej akadémie vied. ISBN 80-224-0479-9.
