= Voyvodovo, Vratsa Province =

Voyvodovo Войводово
- Village
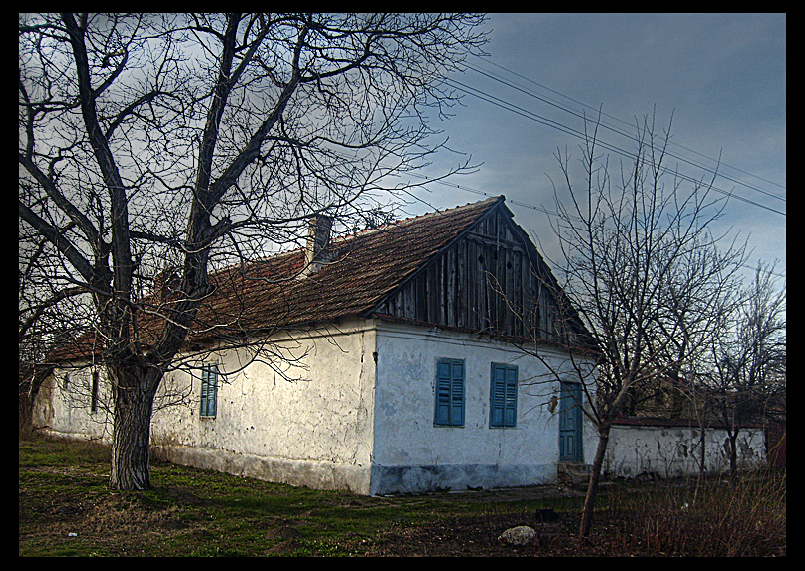
- Old Czech house in Voyvodovo

- Location within Bulgaria
- Coordinates: 43°39′N 23°51′E
- Country: Bulgaria
- Province: Vratsa Province
- Municipality: Miziya

Government
  - Mayor: Valja Bercheva (Miziya)

Area
  - Total: 7.682 km^{2} (2.966 sq mi)

Population (2020)
  - Total: 205
- Time zone: UTC+2 (EET)
  - Summer (DST): UTC+3 (EEST)
- Postal code: 3332

Voyvodovo (Bulgarian: Войводово, Czech: Vojvodovo) is a village in Miziya municipality, Vratsa Province, Bulgaria, at 43°39′N 23°51′E. It was founded in 1900, mostly by Evangelist Czechs, but also by Slovaks, Banat Swabians and Banat Bulgarians, all settlers from the region of Banat, then in Austria-Hungary.

In 1904, Voyvodovo had a population of 410, of whom 215 were Czechs, 100 Slovaks, 57 Serbs, 29 Bulgarian Catholics, and 9 Bulgarian Orthodox. At its recorded peak in 1939, the Czech colony constituted 527 people out of 798, the remainder consisting of 104 Slovaks, 148 Bulgarians, 13 Russians (or Rusyns), and 6 Serbs. There was a Czech school, as well as a Protestant church. The community was deeply religious and puritan. Czech was the dominant language in the entire village, including among other ethnicities. The main street was named the Saint Helena Street, after the village of Svatá Helena (today Sfânta Elena, Caraș-Severin County, Romania), out of which most Czechs originated. Voyvodovo was also an outpost for further Czech migration to other villages in Bulgaria, with around 20 Czech families settling in the village of Belintsi, Razgrad Province, in 1935.

Although all but a dozen families left in 1949-1950 after being recalled to settle depopulated border territories of Czechoslovakia, the village has largely preserved its characteristically Czech rural architecture. Compared to the Bulgarian village houses, those in Voyvodovo are low and elongated, they are painted white and have red roofs with a black plinth and narrow windows with wooden shutters. The houses were built of adobe bricks, each wall approximately 55 centimetres thick. The yards are typically 30×60 metres perpendicular to the street and parallel with the house.

There still exists a Methodist community, which in the early 20th century, under the guidance of pastors Martin Roháček, Gottlieb Koval and Jozef Harmann, was the most prosperous in all Bulgaria. In the 1950s, the almost deserted village was settled by Bulgarians, mostly from the southwestern parts of the country, such as Kyustendil, Belitsa and Ihtiman, but also from other places including the Western Outlands.

As of 2008, the village has a population of 291 and the mayor is Marina Nenova. Voyvodovo lies 10 km from the Danube, south of Oryahovo. The village was named after a certain rebel leader (voivode) from Hristo Botev's band that died in the area in 1876.

== Gallery ==
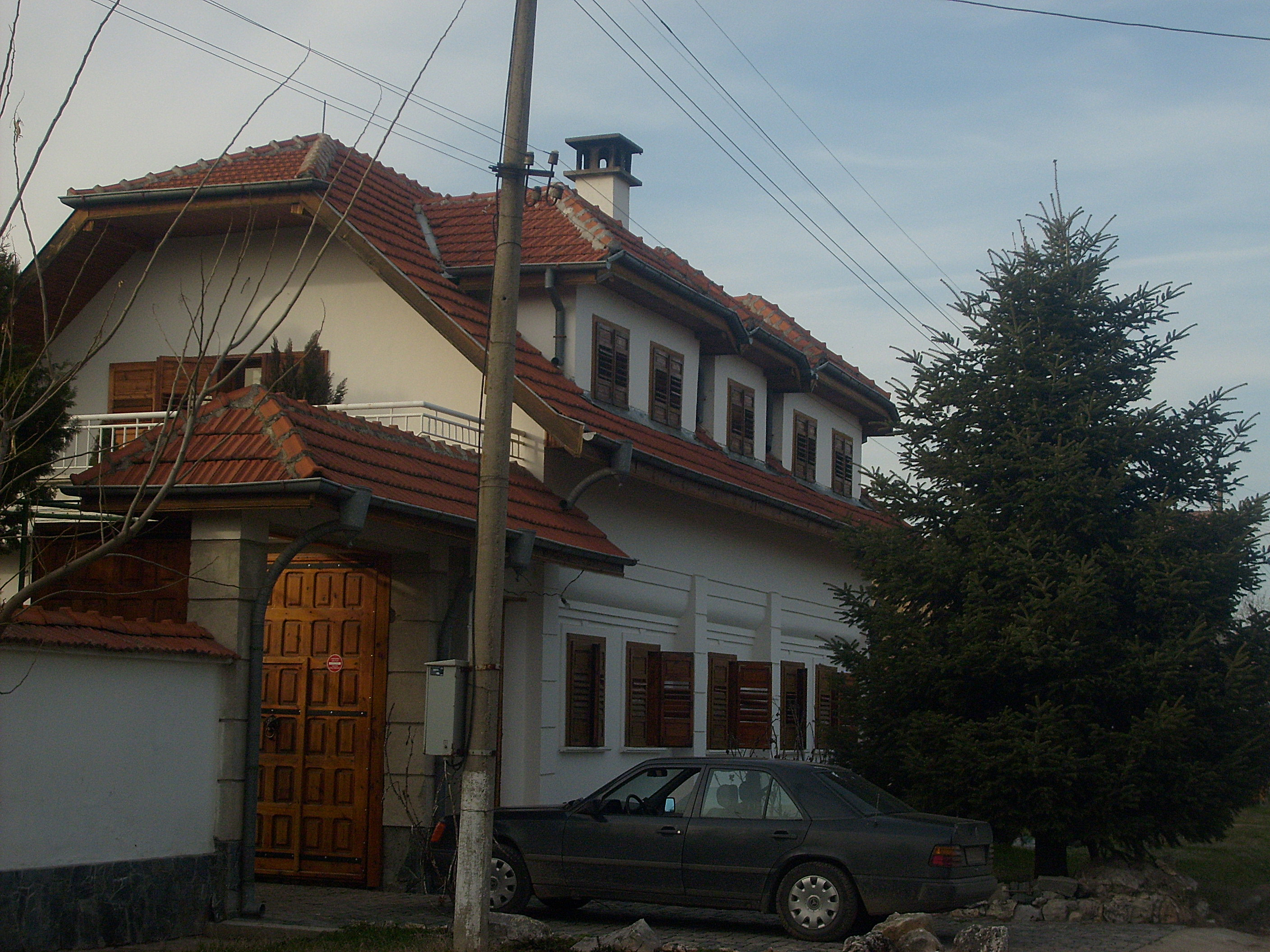
New mansion

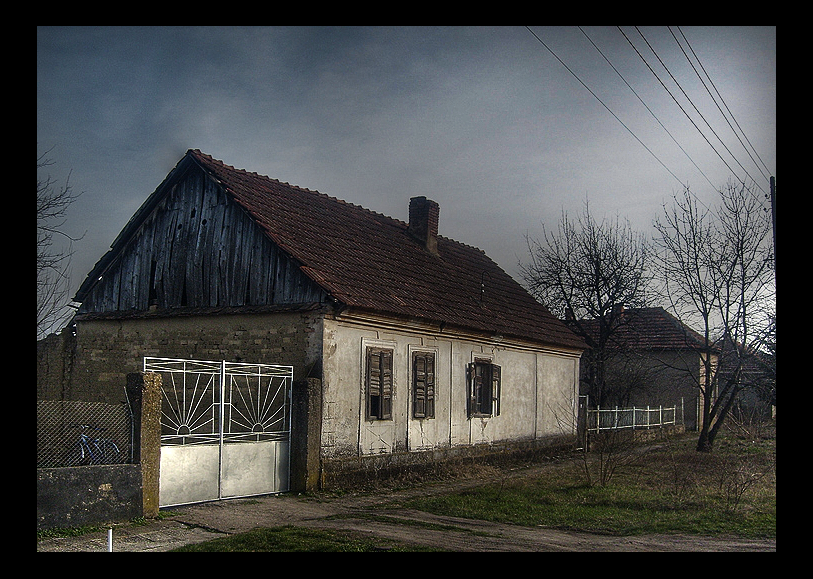
Old house

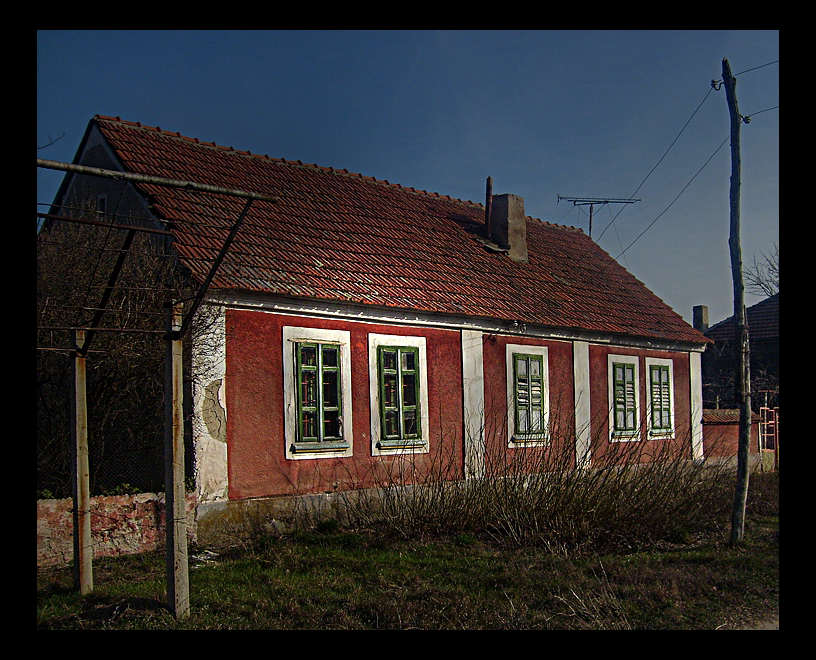
Old house

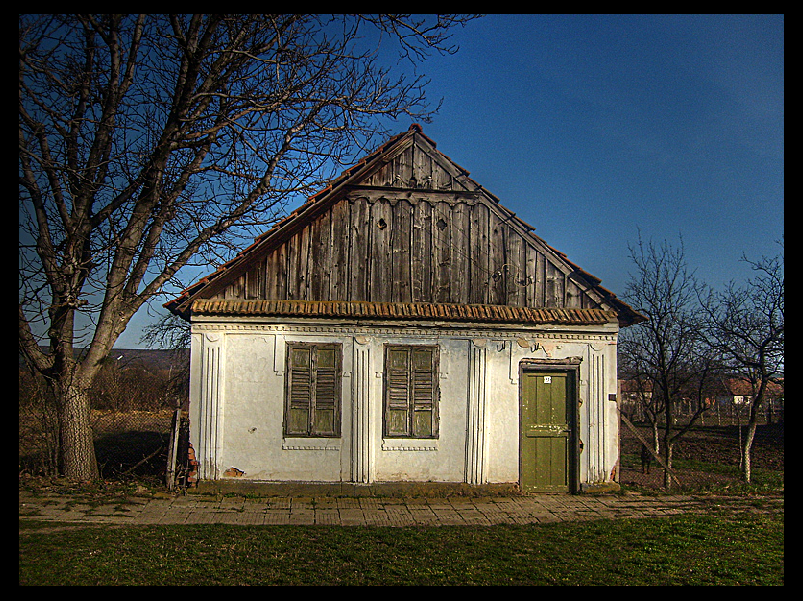
Old house

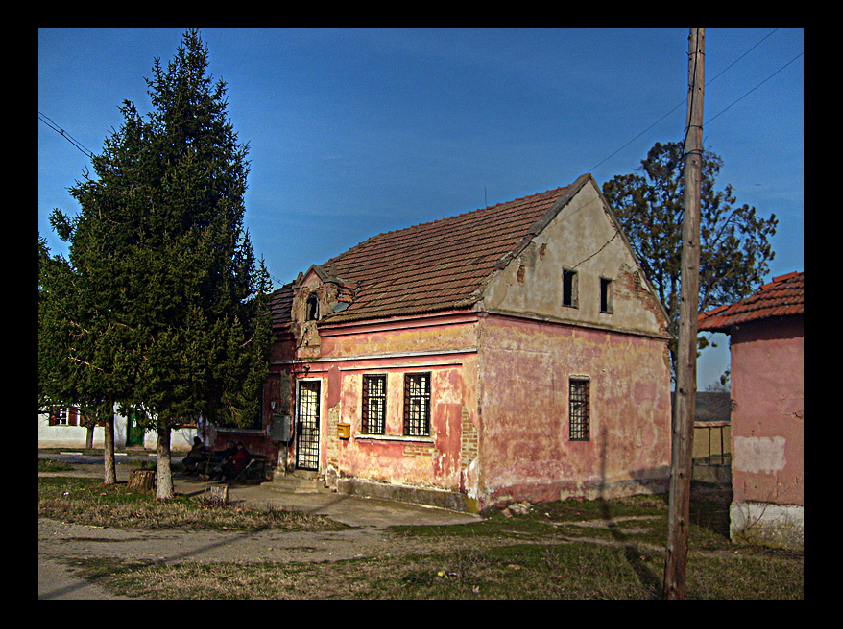
Old house

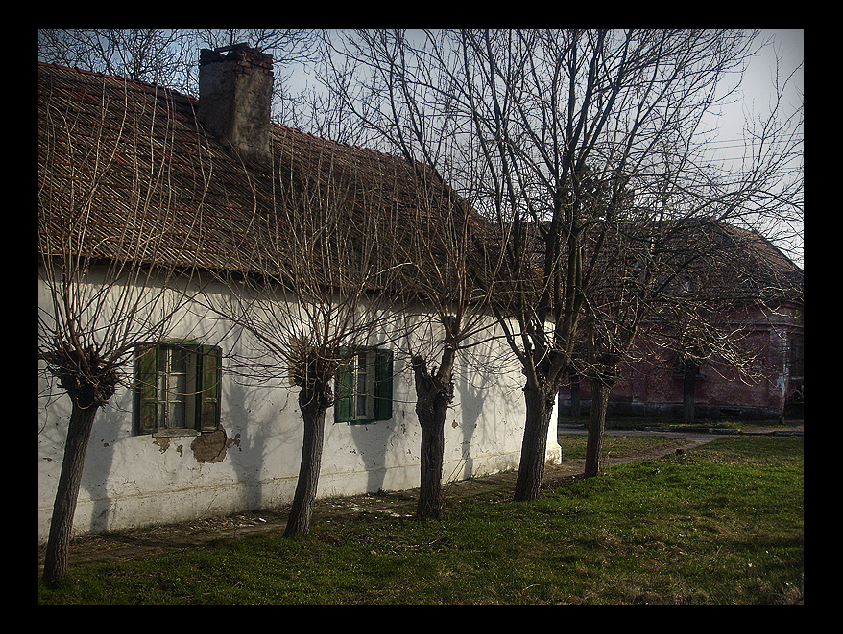
Old house

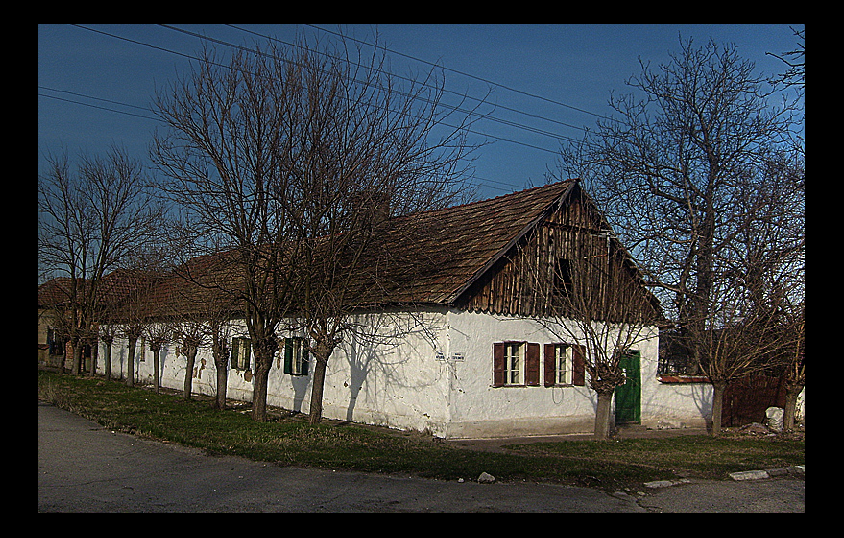
Old house

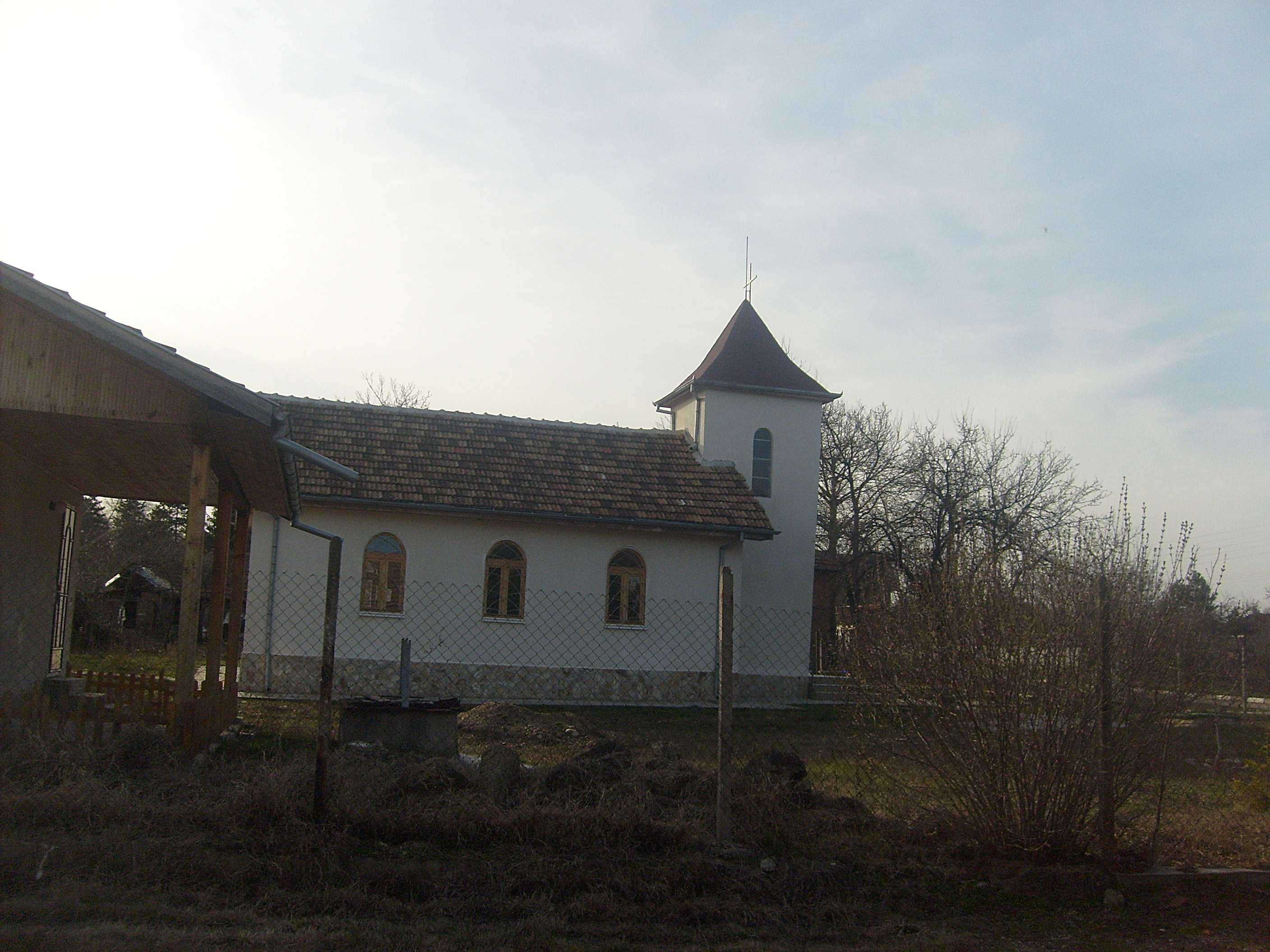
Evangelical church

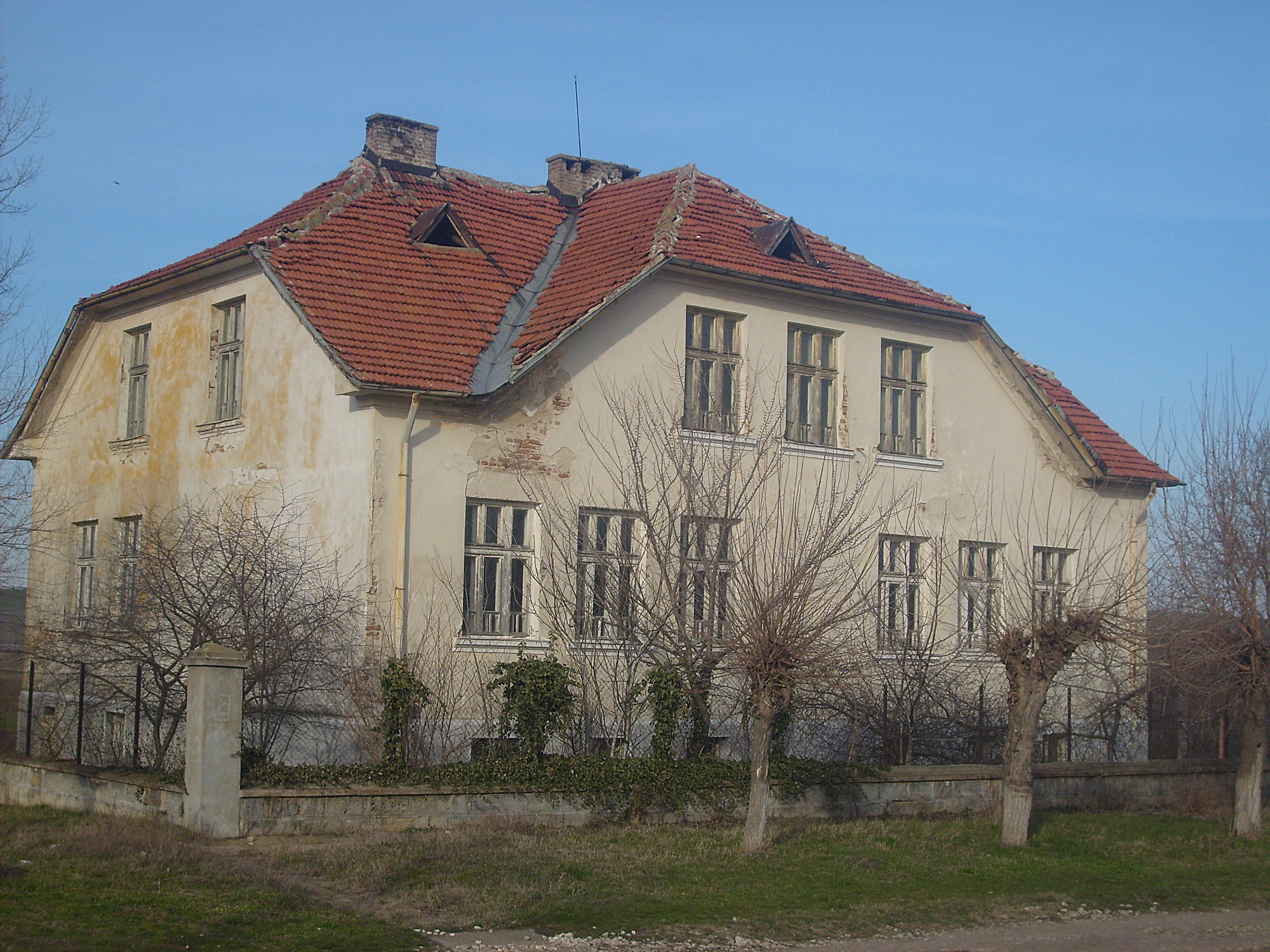
Old building

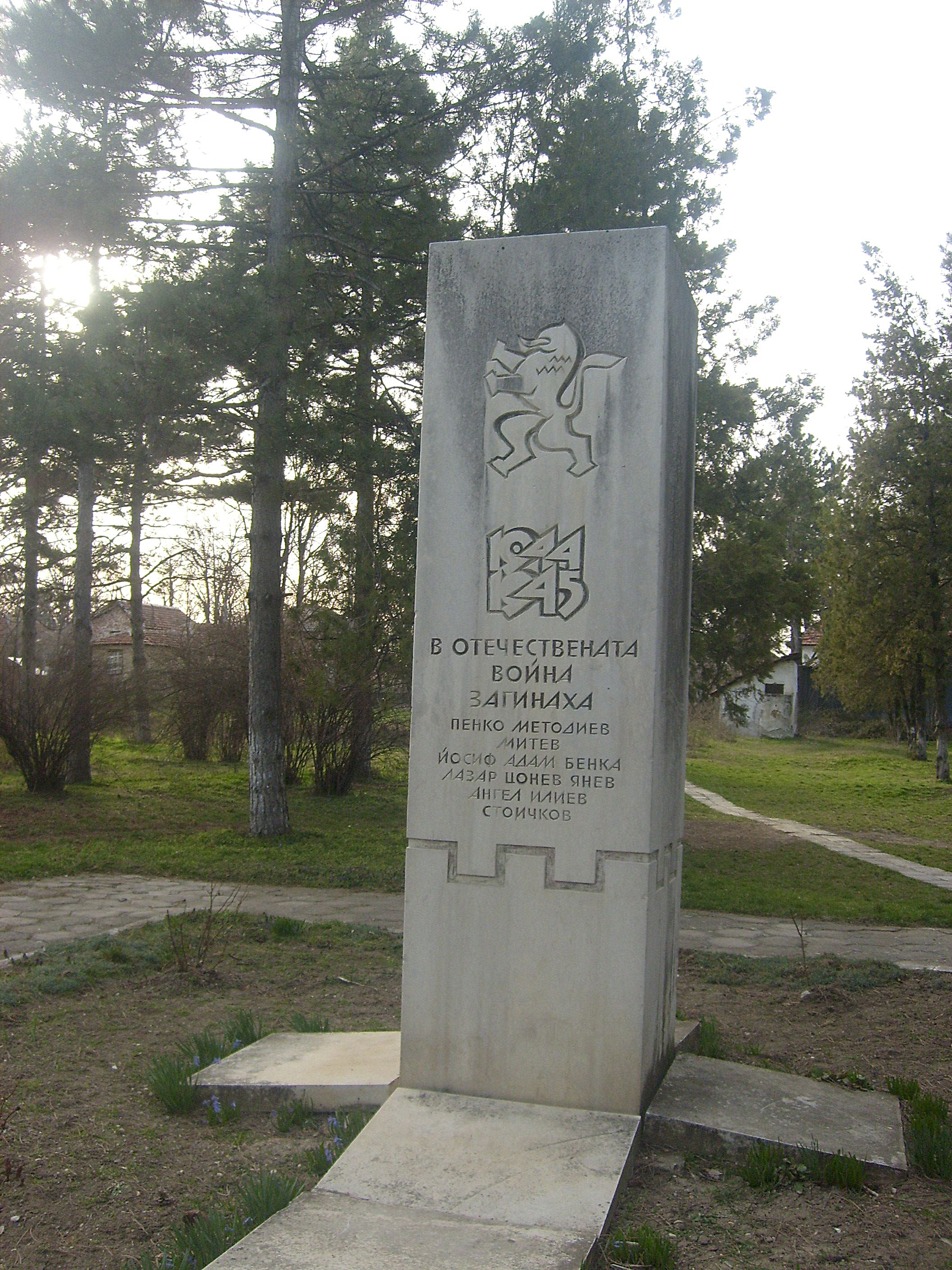
Monument to the perished in World War II

== See also ==
- Czechs and Slovaks in Bulgaria
