= Dobrolevo =

Dobrolevo Добролево
- Location of Dobrolevo
- Coordinates: 43°30′N 23°47′E
- Country: Bulgaria
- Province (Oblast): Vratsa

Government
  - Mayor: Tsvetan Lilov
- Elevation: 143 m (469 ft)

Population (2008-12-15)
  - Total: 876
- Time zone: UTC+2 (EET)
  - Summer (DST): UTC+3 (EEST)
- Postal Code: 3253
- Area code: 09131

Dobrolevo (Bulgarian: Добролево) is a village in Northwestern Bulgaria. It is located in Borovan Municipality, Vratsa Province.
