= Stoyanovo, Montana Province =

Stoyanovo Стояново
- Village
- Location within Bulgaria
- Coordinates: 43.2542°N 23.3403°E
- Country: Bulgaria
- Province: Montana Province
- Municipality: Varshets
- Time zone: UTC+2 (EET)
  - Summer (DST): UTC+3 (EEST)

Stoyanovo is a village in Varshets Municipality, Montana Province, northwestern Bulgaria.

== Natural and Cultural landmarks ==
=== The Iron Bridge ===
In the 19th century there used to be a wooden bridge over the river Botunya, amidst Sopovo locality, but the water carried it away many times. One day, when the river had once again destroyed the bridge, Prince Ferdinand's carriage got stacked in the water and the prince had almost drowned into the wild river Botunya. The mayor and some locals helped him out and, in a gesture of gratitude; he hired Italian engineers to build and maintain an iron bridge with 100 years guaranty. Later on that bridge was called “The Miracle of the Northwest”. It is intact and in a perfect condition even today, 130 years later.

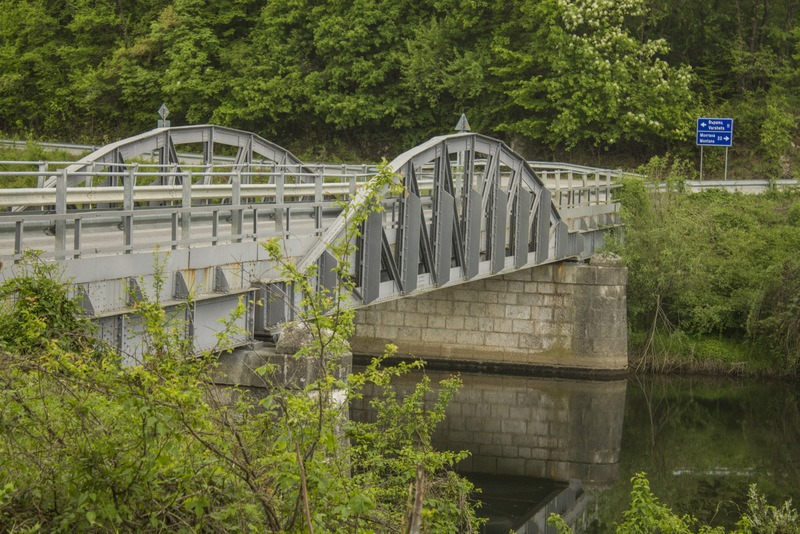
Old and beautiful iron bridge in Montana municipality, Bulgaria

=== Sopovo Locality ===
Sopovo locality is a beautiful and unusual place, difficult to access, close to the village of [Stoyanovo] in the Northwest of Bulgaria. It is located to the east of [Berkovitza] in the valley of the river Botunya, midway between Vratsa and Montana, 10 km after the intersection to Varshets. Interesting facts

There are many legends and myths, surrounding the place. According to some of them, the deep holes that litter the area were used to shelter wood nymphs in their hibernation period. They had to sleep all winter as the bears, because their blood was as cold as the blood of the snakes and they couldn't move at all when the weather is cold.

Another legend says that Krali Marko, the famous hero, was raised by the nymphs in those holes. Drinking their milk was what made him so big and strong. Many Bulgarian and Serbian movies had been shot in the picturesque area, such as “The Password”.

Bungee jumpers and extreme sports fans also like to visit the area. In the recent years the number of accidents increased due to the difficult access to the place and carelessness on the part of the tourists.
