= Sarayevo =

Sarayevo Сараево
- Selo
- Location within Bashkortostan Location within Russia
- Coordinates: 54°04′N 54°36′E
- Country: Russia
- Region: Bashkortostan
- District: Alsheyevsky District
- Time zone: UTC+5:00

Sarayevo (Russian: Сараево; Bashkir: Һарай, Haray) is a rural locality (a selo) in Truntaishevsky Selsoviet, Alsheyevsky District, Bashkortostan, Russia. The population was 342 as of 2010.

== Geography ==
Sarayevo is located 32 km west of Rayevsky (the district's administrative centre) by road. Irik is the nearest rural locality.
