= Virovsko =

Coordinates: 43°18′N 23°48′E

Virovsko (Bulgarian: Вировско) is a village in Vratsa Municipality, Vratsa Province, Bulgaria.

== See also ==
- Vratsa
