= Hayredin =

Hayredin Хайредин
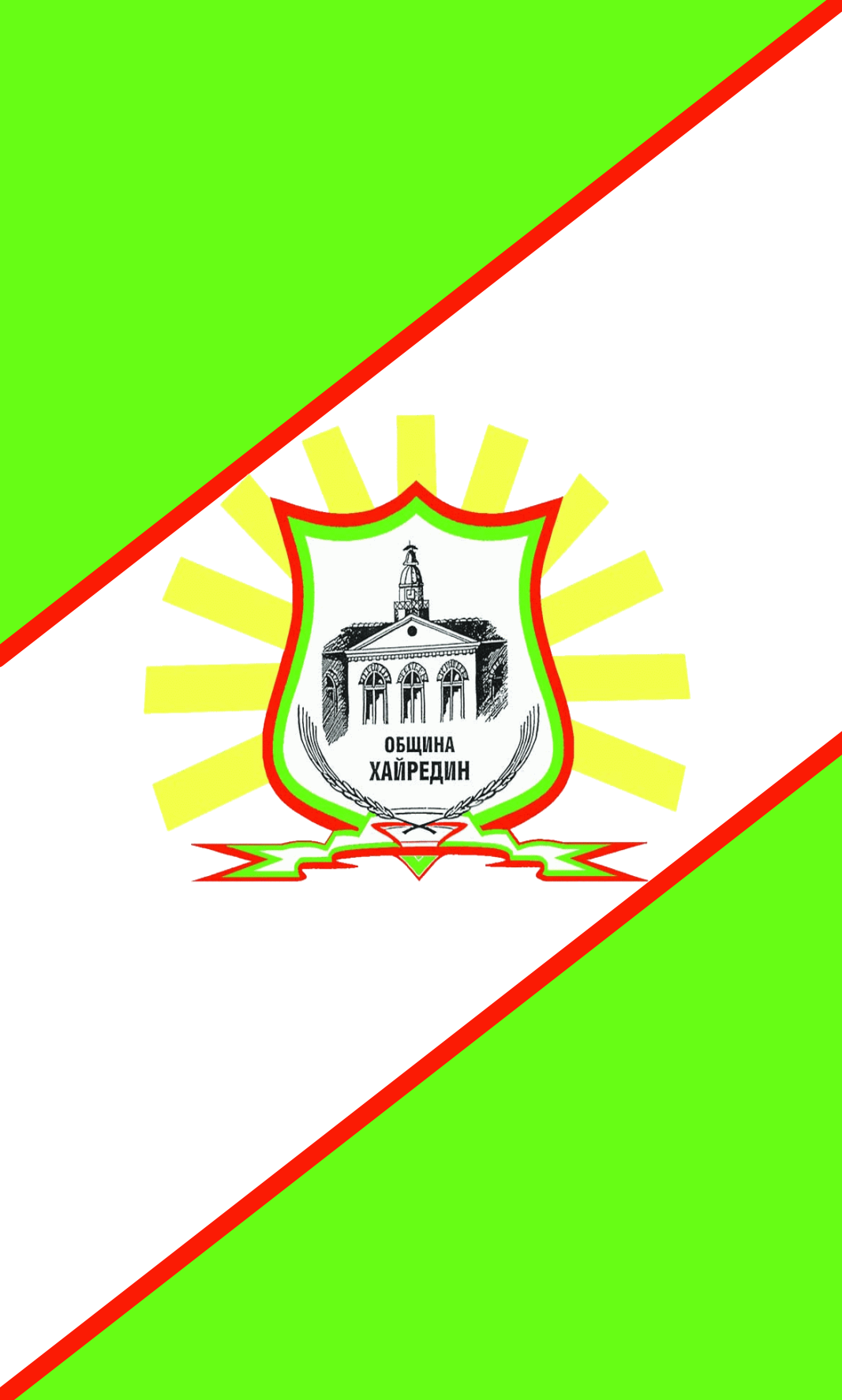
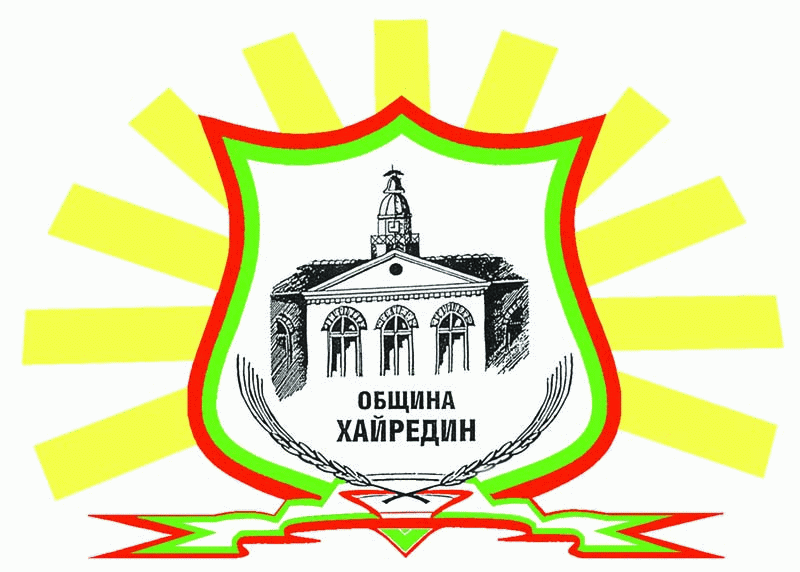
- Flag Coat of arms

- Location of Hayredin
- Coordinates: 43°36′N 23°40′E
- Country: Bulgaria
- Province (Oblast): Vratsa

Government
  - Mayor: Radoslav Stoykov
- Elevation: 93 m (305 ft)

Population (2008)
  - Total: 1,701
- Time zone: UTC+2 (EET)
  - Summer (DST): UTC+3 (EEST)
- Postal Code: 3357
- Area code: 09166

Hayredin (Bulgarian: Хайредин, pronounced [xɐjrɛˈdin]; also transliterated Hajredin or Hairedin) is a village in northwestern Bulgaria, part of Vratsa Province. It is the administrative centre of Hayredin Municipality, which lies in the northwestern part of Vratsa Province. The village is located along the Ogosta River, 30 kilometres south of Kozloduy, 25 kilometres south of the Danube River, 52 kilometres from the provincial capital Vratsa and 186 kilometres from Sofia.

Hayredin was founded in 1574 by four families who settled on land presented to them by a high-ranking Ottoman official. It may have existed before the Ottoman conquest of the Second Bulgarian Empire, as it was mentioned among the places burnt down by the invaders; the old name of the village was Eredin. The local Bulgarian Orthodox church of Saint Paraskeva was built in 1858–1862, and the Prosveta community centre (chitalishte) was founded in 1909. The village has a mineral spring.

== Gallery ==
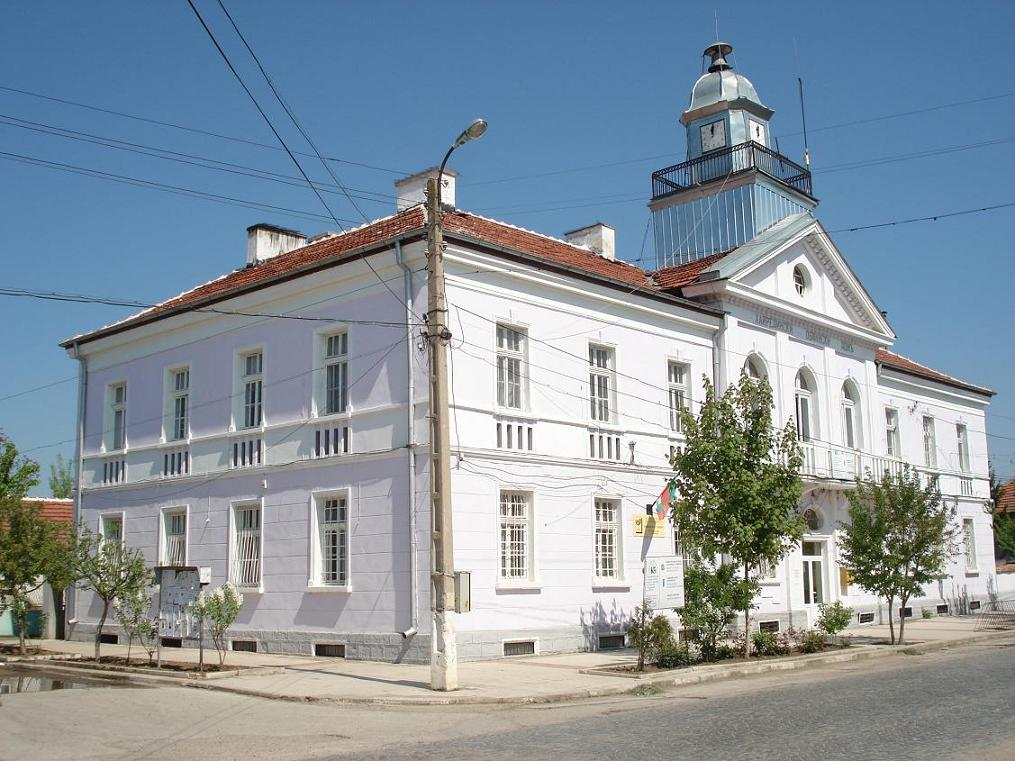
The Neoclassical Hayredin municipal hall

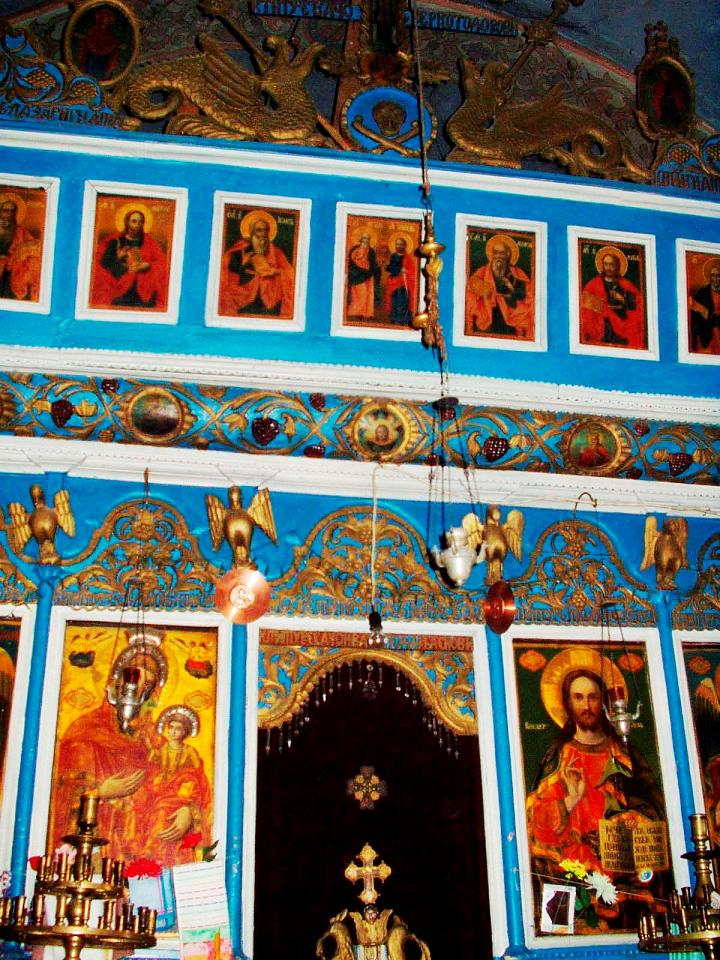
Inside the church in Hayredin

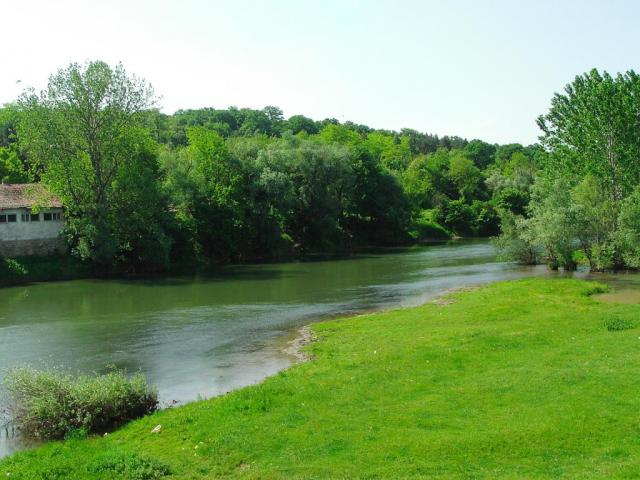
The Ogosta River

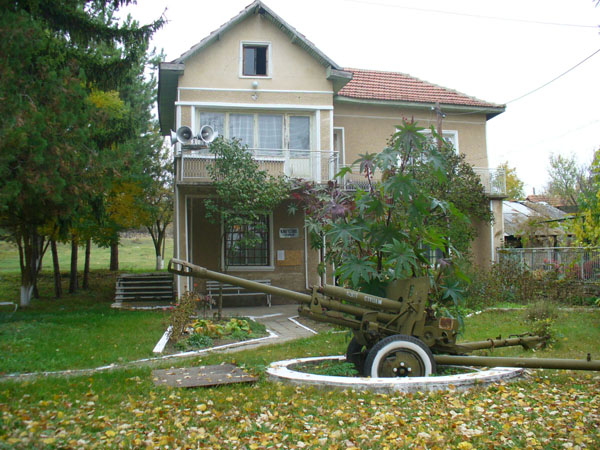
Mayor's office in Botevo
