= Borovan =

Borovan Борован
- Village
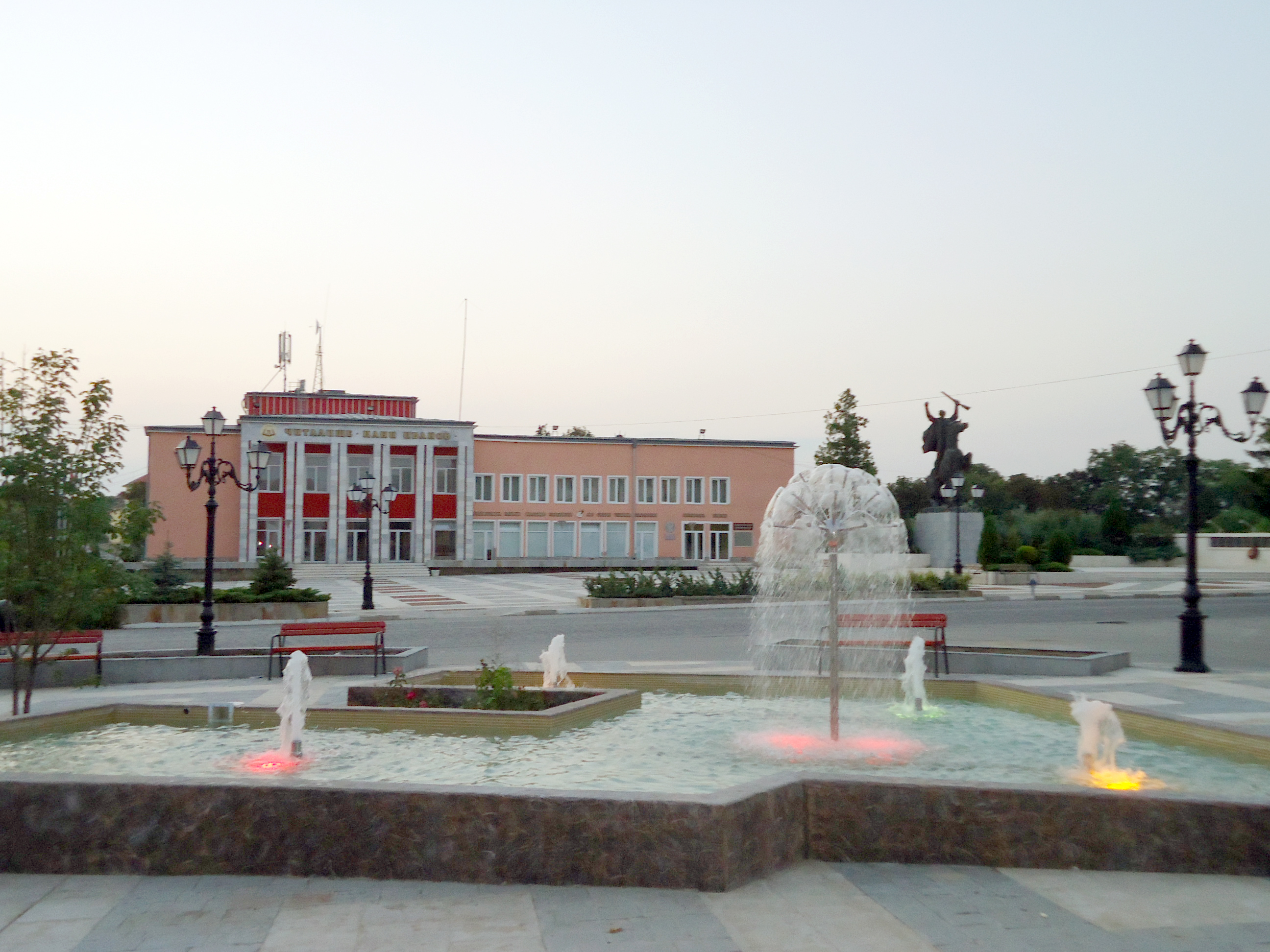

- Location of Borovan, Bulgaria
- Coordinates: 43°26′N 23°45′E
- Country: Bulgaria
- Province: Vratsa Province
- Municipality: Borovan

Government
  - Mayor: Ivan Kostovski
- Elevation: 162 m (531 ft)

Population (2022)
  - Total: 2,865
- Time zone: UTC+2 (EET)
  - Summer (DST): UTC+3 (EEST)
- Postal Code: 3240
- Area codes: 09147 from Bulgaria, 003599147 from outside

Borovan (Bulgarian: Борован, pronounced [buruˈvan]) is a village in northwestern Bulgaria, part of Vratsa Province. It is the administrative centre of Borovan municipality, which lies in the central part of Vratsa Province. Borovan is located 150 kilometres north-northeast of the capital Sofia.

== Municipality ==
Borovan municipality has an area of 212 square kilometres and includes the following 5 places:

- Borovan
- Dobrolevo
- Malorad
- Nivyanin
- Sirakovo

The population is mostly Bulgarian, with a sizable Roma minority.

== Honour ==
Borovan Knoll on Graham Land in Antarctica is named after Borovan.
