= Byala Slatina =

Town in Vratsa, Bulgaria

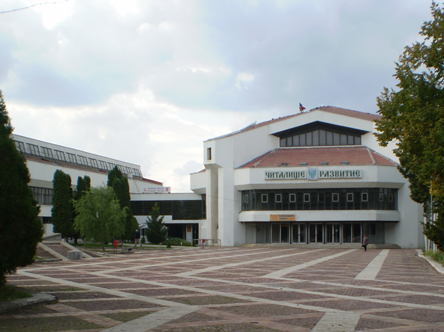
- Chitalishte in the centre of the town.

- Location of Byala Slatina
- Coordinates: 43°28′N 23°56′E
- Country: Bulgaria
- Province (Oblast): Vratsa

Government
  - Mayor: Ivo Tsvetkov
- Elevation: 99 m (325 ft)

Population (31.12.2016)
  - City: 10,282
  - Urban: 22,716
- Time zone: UTC+2 (EET)
  - Summer (DST): UTC+3 (EEST)
- Postal Code: 3200
- Area code: 0915

Byala Slatina (Bulgarian: Бяла Слатина pronounced [ˈbʲaɫɐ ˈsɫatinɐ]) is a town in Vratsa Province, Northwestern Bulgaria. As of December 2016, the town had a population of 10,282. It is the seat of Byala Slatina Municipality.

The first hospital in the village was opened in 1889. In 1904 the village of Byala Slatina became a town. Ilia Kalkanov is the mayor in which the settlement becomes a town.

At the outbreak of the Balkan War in 1912, three people from Byala Slatina were volunteers in the Macedonian-Adrianople Corps. Byala Slatina was declared a town by a decree of King Ferdinand on June 27, 1914.
