= Oryahovo =

Oryahovo Оряхово
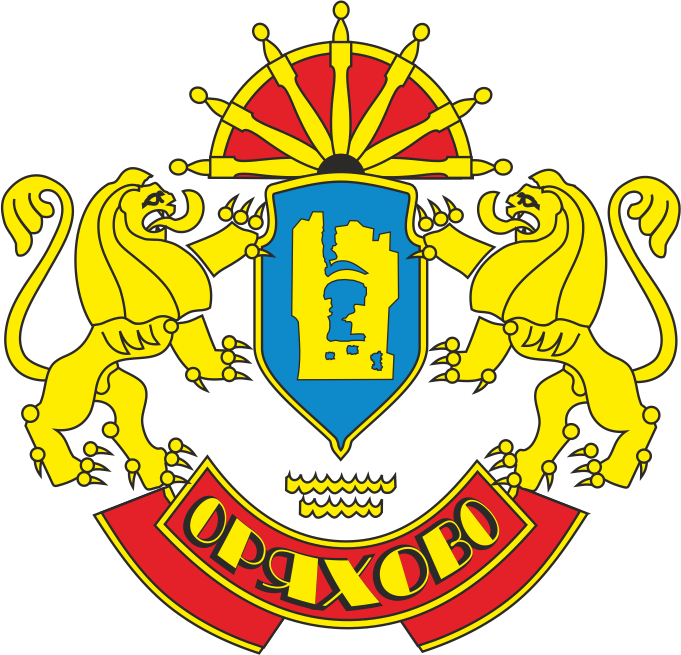
- Coat of arms

- Location of Oryahovo
- Coordinates: 43°44′03″N 23°57′40″E
- Country: Bulgaria
- Province (Oblast): Vratsa

Government
  - Mayor: Rosen Dobrev (GERB)

Area
  - Total: 50,792 km^{2} (19,611 sq mi)
- Elevation: 173 m (568 ft)

Population (2020)
  - Total: 5,007
- Time zone: UTC+2 (EET)
  - Summer (DST): UTC+3 (EEST)
- Postal Code: 3300
- Area code: 09171
- Website: Official website

Oryahovo (Bulgarian: Оряхово pronounced [oˈrʲaxovo]) is a port city in northwestern Bulgaria, part of Vratsa Province. It is located in a hilly area on the right bank of the Danube, just east of the mouth of the river Ogosta, a few more kilometres downstream from where the Jiu flows into the Danube on Romanian territory. The town is known for the ferry service that connects it to the Romanian town of Bechet across the river. There are also plans by local private companies for a bridge across the Danube.

== History ==
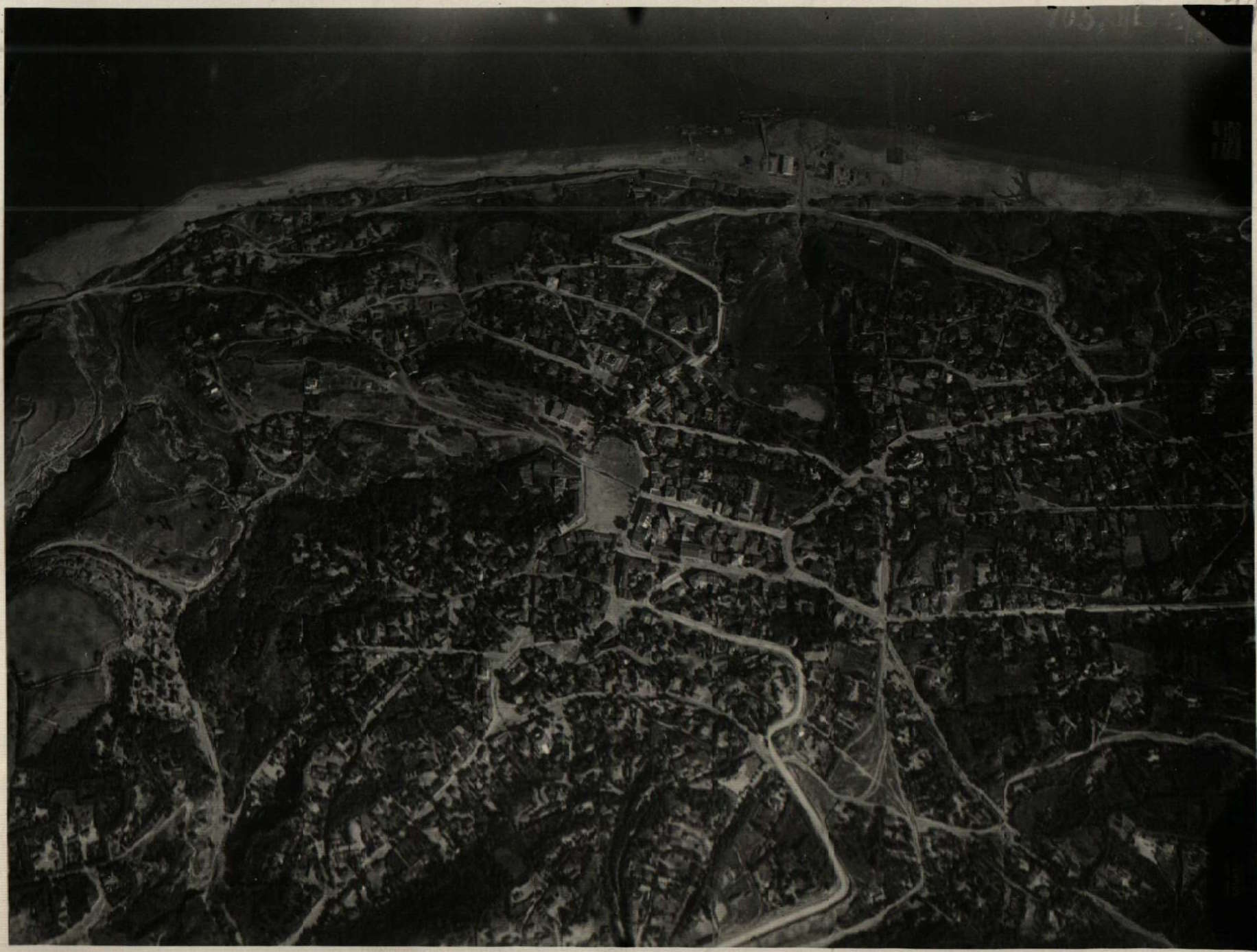
Oryahovo in the 1930s

=== Ancient history and Middle Ages ===
The town's name has evolved through the course of history, with names such as Vrhov, Orezov, Oreov, and Rahovo being mentioned in documents until the current one was officially established in 1886. The area around Oryahovo has been inhabited since ancient times, as archaeological research has proven with findings from the early Neolithic to the Late Middle Ages. A fortress called Kamaka (Камъка), which existed from the 9th to the 14th century, is located 1 km (0.62 mi) west of Oryahovo. In 1396, the city, already controlled by the Ottoman Turks, was sacked and its Ottoman civilian inhabitants killed while the prisoners were massacred by French crusaders heading towards Nicopolis to participate in the Battle of Nicopolis. The troops of Holy Roman Emperor Sigismund and Polish King Władysław III of Varna passed through the fortress during their unsuccessful crusades (the Battle of Nicopolis in 1396 and the Battle of Varna in 1444, respectively) against the Ottoman Empire.

=== Bulgarian National Revival ===
During the Bulgarian National Revival, Oryahovo established itself as an economic and industrial centre and a key point for the supply of the Ottoman Empire with goods through the Danube. The town was mentioned as an important Danube port in a 1762 book printed in Brussels. The St George Church was opened in 1837, a secular school was built in the town in 1857 and a community centre (читалище, chitalishte) followed in 1871. During the Russo-Turkish War of 1877–1878, the town was liberated on 21 November 1877 by Romanian forces after three-day fighting. A memorial by Italian sculptor Arnaldo Zocchi was erected in their honour.

=== Liberated Bulgaria ===
After the liberation, Oryahovo was known for the lively trade and rich cultural life. A provincial centre for three months, it became the centre of an okrag, an administrative division, for 10 years (1877–1882 and 1884–1889). The architecture from the period is typically influenced by that of Western Europe, with many such buildings preserved today.

A railway line linking Oryahovo with Cherven Bryag was constructed in 1926; a new church, the Assumption of Mary Church, opened in 1930, and a new building for the community centre was built in 1936 after a project by two Vidin architects.

Some of the first industrial companies in the city – a spare parts factory and a metalworking company – were opened in 1961. Kozloduy Nuclear Power Plant, a short drive west of town, is also a major employer.

The Oryahovo–Bechet ferry, crossing the Danube, is one of the main transport corridors from Bulgaria to Romania. This is the most direct route from Sofia to Romania, Ukraine and other countries.

== Sport ==
=== Badminton ===
Badminton has been developed in Oryahovo since 1980. This sport has brought considerable fame to the city in Bulgaria, but also in Romania, the former USSR, Georgia, Poland, Moldova, Hungary and Northern Macedonia. The badminton coach is Koycho Stanev and his wife Nikulina Staneva. From 1981 to 1991, when the workers' badminton was closed, the men's team at the Post Office in Oryahovo was the undisputed republican champion. The team was composed of Koycho Stanev, Ventsislav Stanev, Boyko Angelov and Yani Kirilov. Many children practice badminton in the renovated city hall. The 5th–7th and 8th–10th-grade badminton teams from Hristo Botev High School are regular participants in the finals of school games, invariably ranking among the top six teams in the country. The teams are entirely made up of players from the Oryahovo 80 Badminton Club with chairman and coach Stanev and Staneva.

Today, many children train, with an emphasis on children's and youth badminton – up to 17 years inclusive. From the badminton school in Oryahovo is the national athlete Vladimir Metodiev, who competes in men's badminton. Children from the 2nd to 10th grades practice badminton. In 2010, coach Stanev participated in a national tournament for veterans in Varna, where at the age of 55+ in the men's doubles discipline he became a national champion with partner Radi Nikolov from Stara Zagora.

In 2010, the under-19 youth team of the Oryahovo-80 Badminton Club won fourth place nationally at the State Team Championship for youth under 19, and the girls 9th place. The teams were composed of Alexander Valeriev, Devin Slavov, Kristian Petrov and Dean Genov on the boys' team and Janet Borisova, Gloria Simova, Tsvetelina Vasileva and Dalia Tosheva. Coach Stanev participates in the course for second-level coaches of the International Olympic Committee and the Bulgarian Olympic Committee.

== Notable people ==
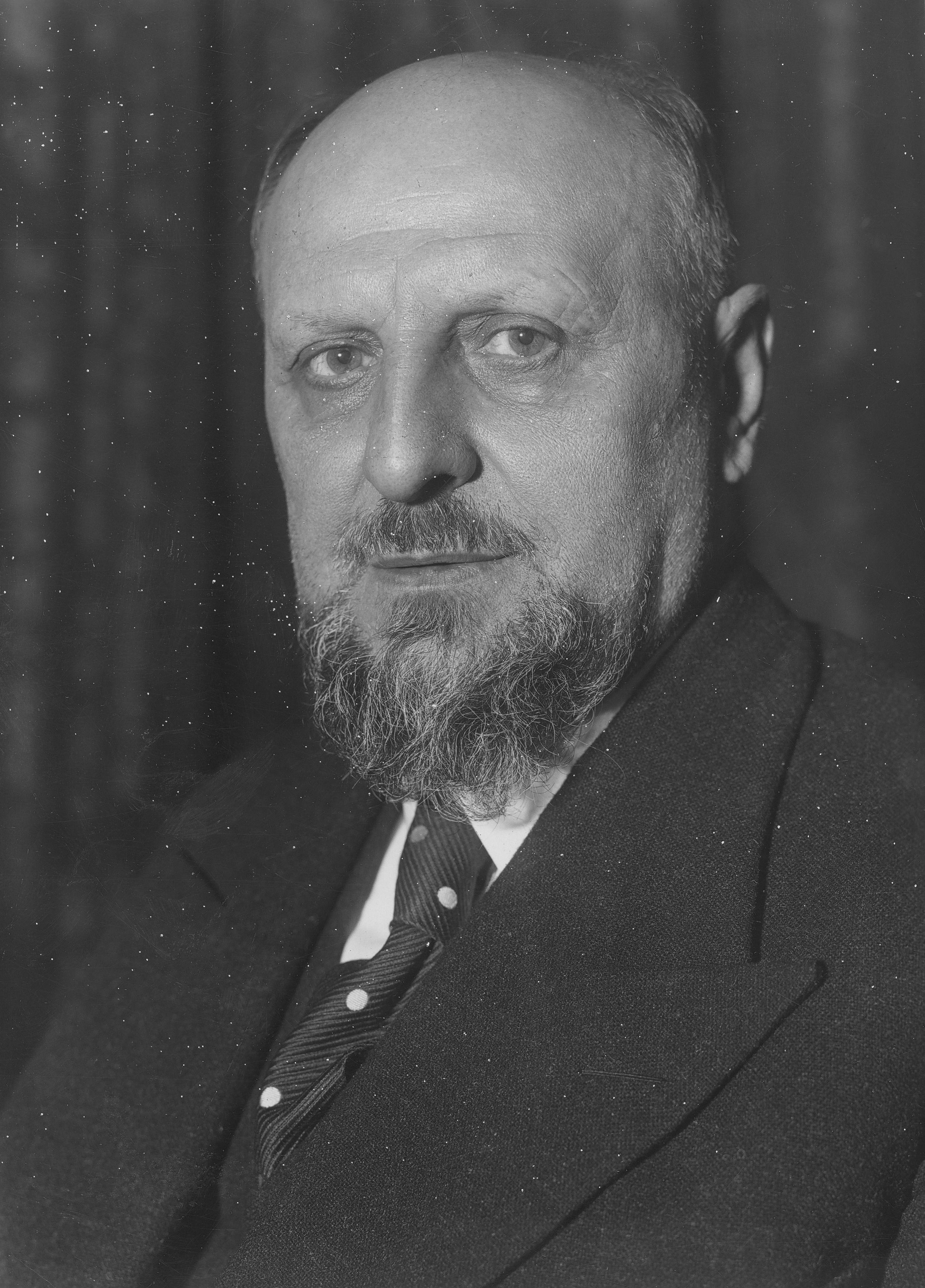
Aleksandar Tsankov

=== Born in Oryahovo ===
- Aleksandar Tsankov (1879–1959), economist and politician
- Andrej Chaprazov (1920–1999), actor
- Boris Spasov (1912–2002), jurist
- Venelin Venkov (born 1982), wrestler
- Dimitar Efremov, revolutionary
- Dimitar Tsolov (1896–1970), architect
- Zahari Todorov, revolutionary
- Ivan Vasiljov (1893–1979), architect
- Kosta Lulchev (1882–1965), politician
- Ljuben Genov, painter
- Ljuben Dikov (1895–1973), politician
- Ljuben Telcharov (1907–1995), pathologist and alpinist
- Marin Varbanov (1932–1989), painter
- Temenuzhka Radulova (born 1951), journalist
- Todor Panitsa (1879–1925), revolutionary
- Tsveti Ivanov (1914–1950), politician
- Tseko Tsorbov (1899–1987), jurist and translator
- Juksel Kadriev (born 1973), TV host
- Evgeni Tudzharski (born 1990), Cyber Expert

=== Others connected to Oryahovo ===
- Diko Iliev (1898–1984), composer
- Naum Torbov (1880–1952), architect

== Annual events ==
- Every year around August 18, the traditional fair days are held in the town of Oryahovo.
- Every year around August 19–23, during the traditional fair days, a badminton tournament is held for children, teenagers and veterans.
- Every year from August 9 to 18 an art plein air dedicated to Marin Varbanov is held.
- Swimming on the Danube River around August 20 from the Romanian coast to the Bulgarian coast.
- Every year around August 20, a chess tournament is held at the Kamaka Hotel.

== Gallery Monuments ==
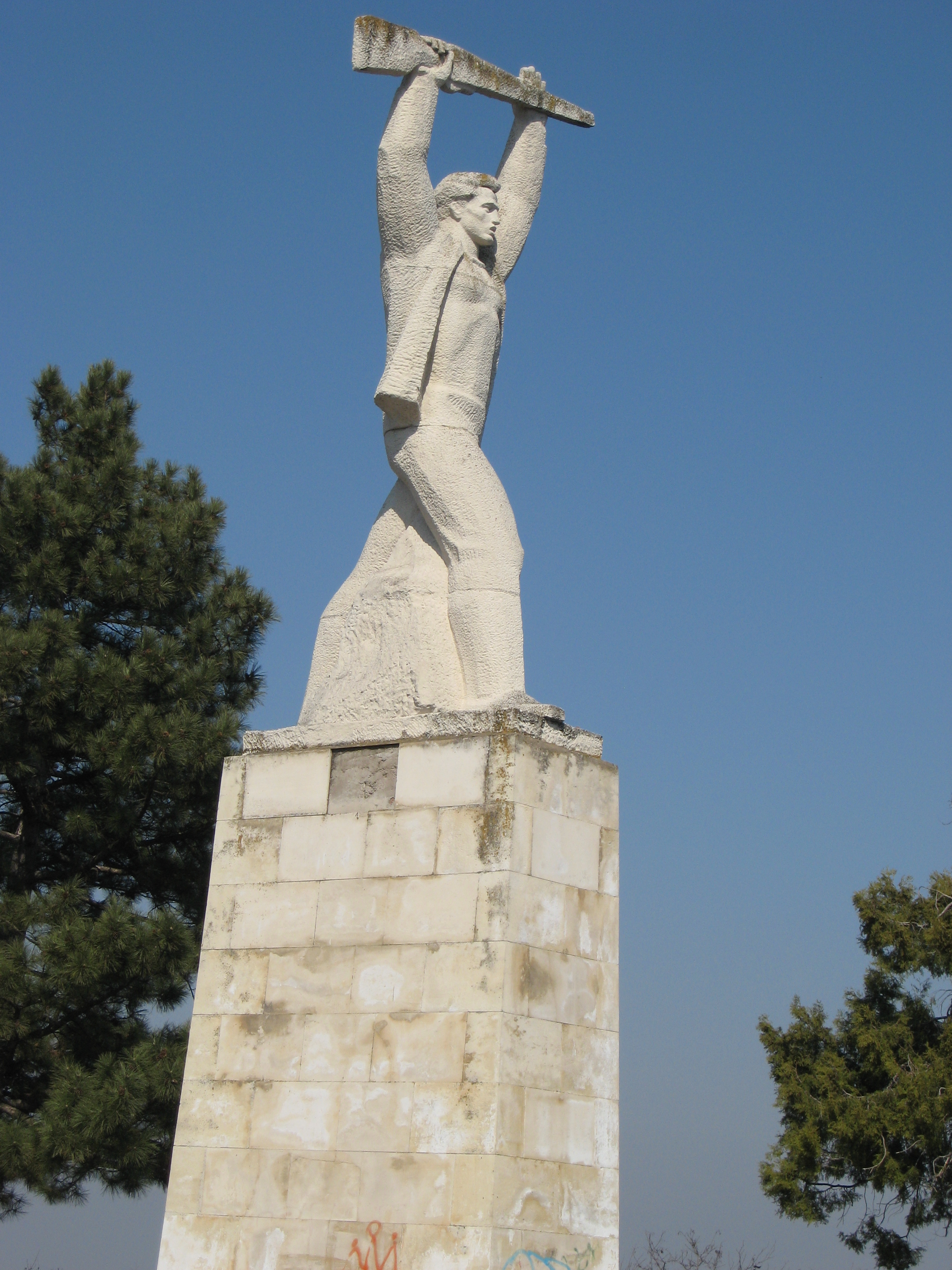

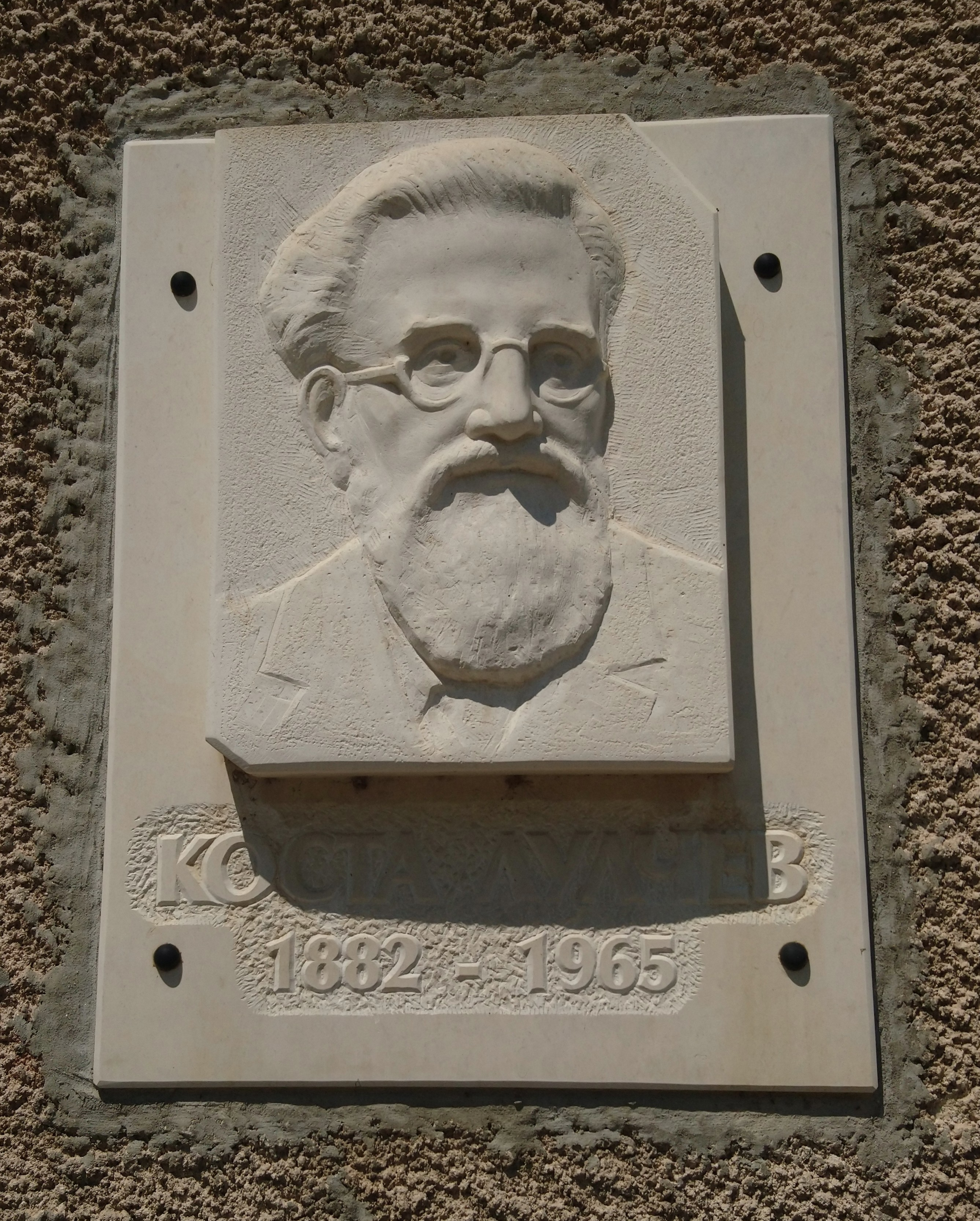
Kosta Lulchev memorial plaque

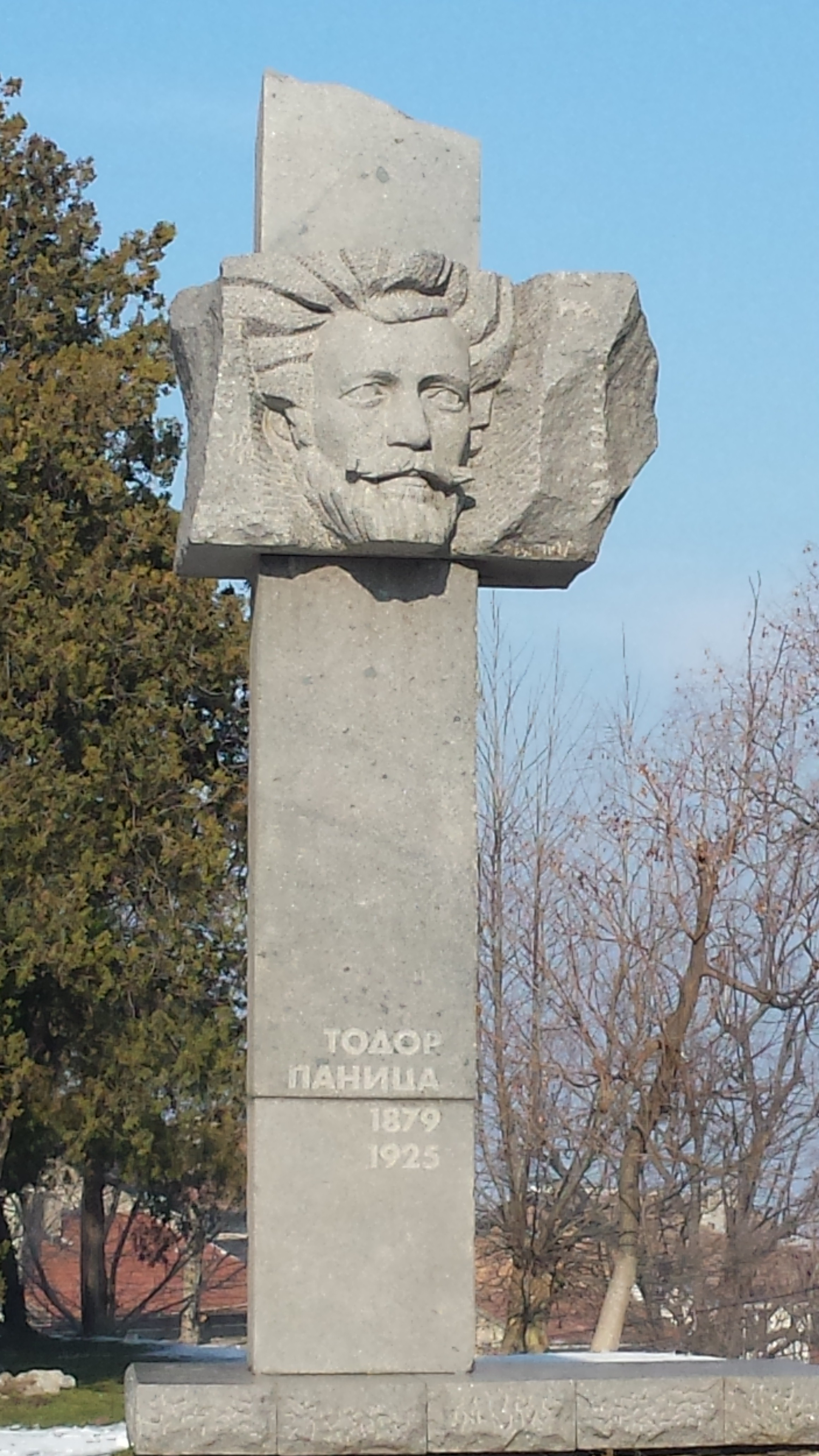
Todor Panitsa's monument

== Honour ==
Oryahovo Heights on Livingston Island in the South Shetland Islands, Antarctica, is named after Oryahovo.
