= Mizia (town) =

Town and municipality in Vratsa Province, Bulgaria

Mizia Мизия
- Coat of arms

- Coordinates: 43°41′N 23°51′E
- Country: Bulgaria

Mizia (Bulgarian: Мизия, pronounced [ˈmizijɐ]) is a town and municipality in Vratsa Province, northwestern Bulgaria near the Danube river. As of December 2009, the town had a population of 3,354.

The town's original name was Bukyovtsi (Букьовци); an urban-type settlement, it was merged with Glozhene in 1970 to create the town of Mizia (meaning "Moesia"), but the two were separated again in 1978. However, Bukyovtsi retained the new name and its town status, while Glozhene kept its old name and village status.

== Honour ==
Miziya Peak on Livingston Island in the South Shetland Islands, Antarctica is named after Miziya.
