= Ogosta =

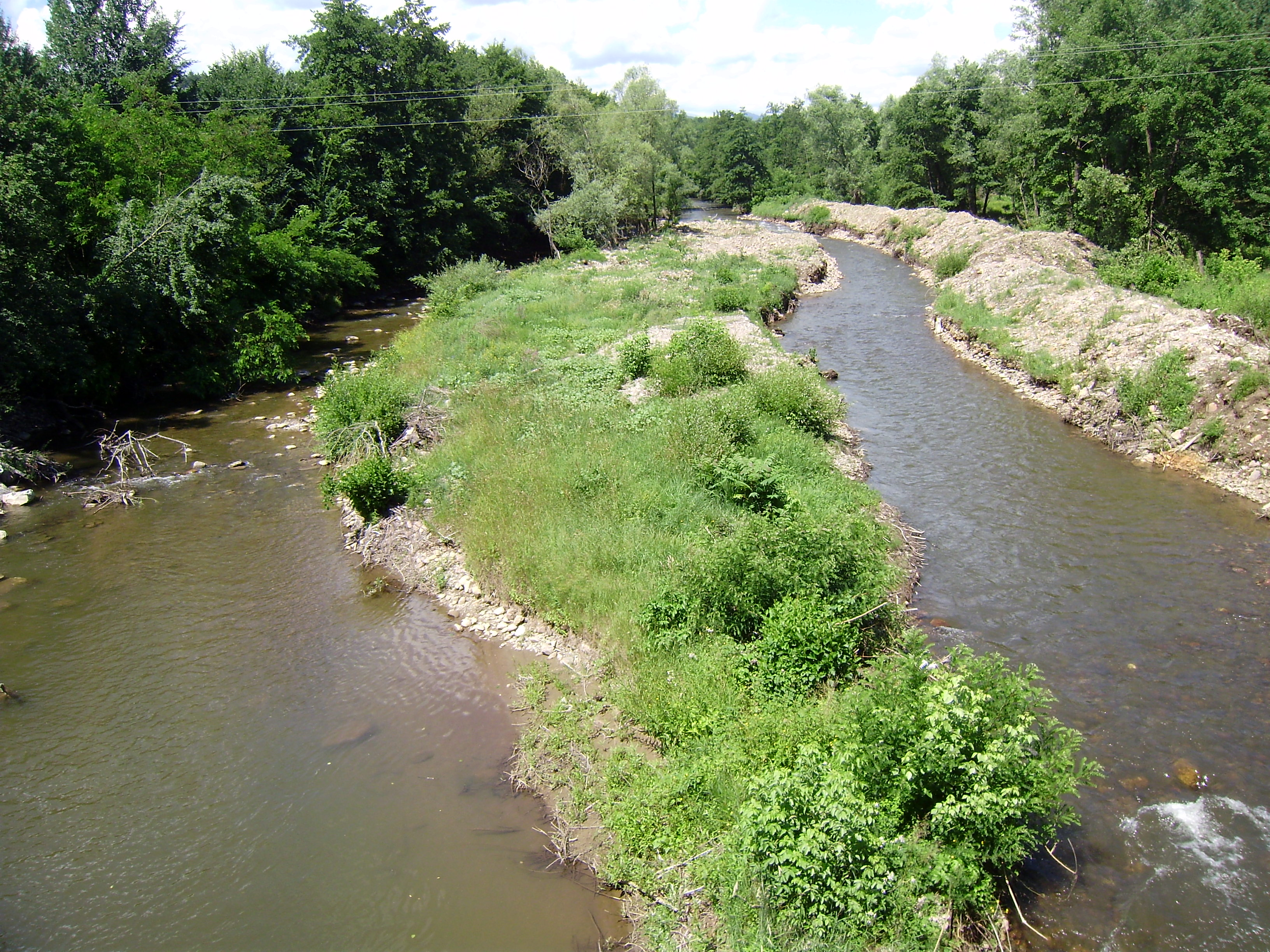

Location
- Country: Bulgaria

Physical characteristics
- Source
  - elevation: 1,760 m (5,770 ft)
- Mouth
  - location: Danube
  - coordinates: 43.7461°N 23.8849°E
  - elevation: 27 m (89 ft)
- Length: 147 km (91 mi)
- Basin size: 3,157 km^{2} (1,219 sq mi)

Basin features
- Progression: Danube→ Black Sea

The Ogosta (Bulgarian: Огоста [oˈɡɔstɐ], Latin: Augusta), is the largest river in Northwestern Bulgaria, a right tributary of the Danube. It originates at Chiprovska Mountain, a 2,168 meters high section of the Western Balkan Mountains, at an altitude of about 1,760 meters, on the border with Serbia. The towns of Chiprovtsi, Montana, and Miziya are situated on the river's banks.

The Ogosta river is 147.4 km in length and is fed by 40 tributaries (including the Skat River) in a watershed of 3,157 square kilometers. The average water discharge in the lower course of the river is 18 cubic meters per second. Along the river's length there are 14 irrigation systems, 8 hydropower plants, and 13 dams.

Although the river is used for domestic consumption, it does suffer from pollution, particularly from nitrates. These come from the use of fertilizers that are not fully used by the plants. Other than that, there were intensive mining activities along the river between 1950 and 1999, and factories also produced pollution. That being said, the river's water quality is not uniformly poor, and the upper areas of the river are relatively free from pollution.

The major sources of income the river provides are for farmers and animal herders. This is because the farmers use the waters to irrigate their crops, and the animal husbands breed livestock, let their livestock drink the water, and grow vegetation for the livestock using the water from the river.

== Honour ==
Ogosta Point on Livingston Island in the South Shetland Islands, Antarctica is named after Ogosta.

== See also ==
- List of rivers of Bulgaria
- Ogosta Reservoir
