= Vratsa Province =

Province in northwestern Bulgaria

Coordinates: 43°31′N 23°36′E

Vratsa Province Област Враца
- Province
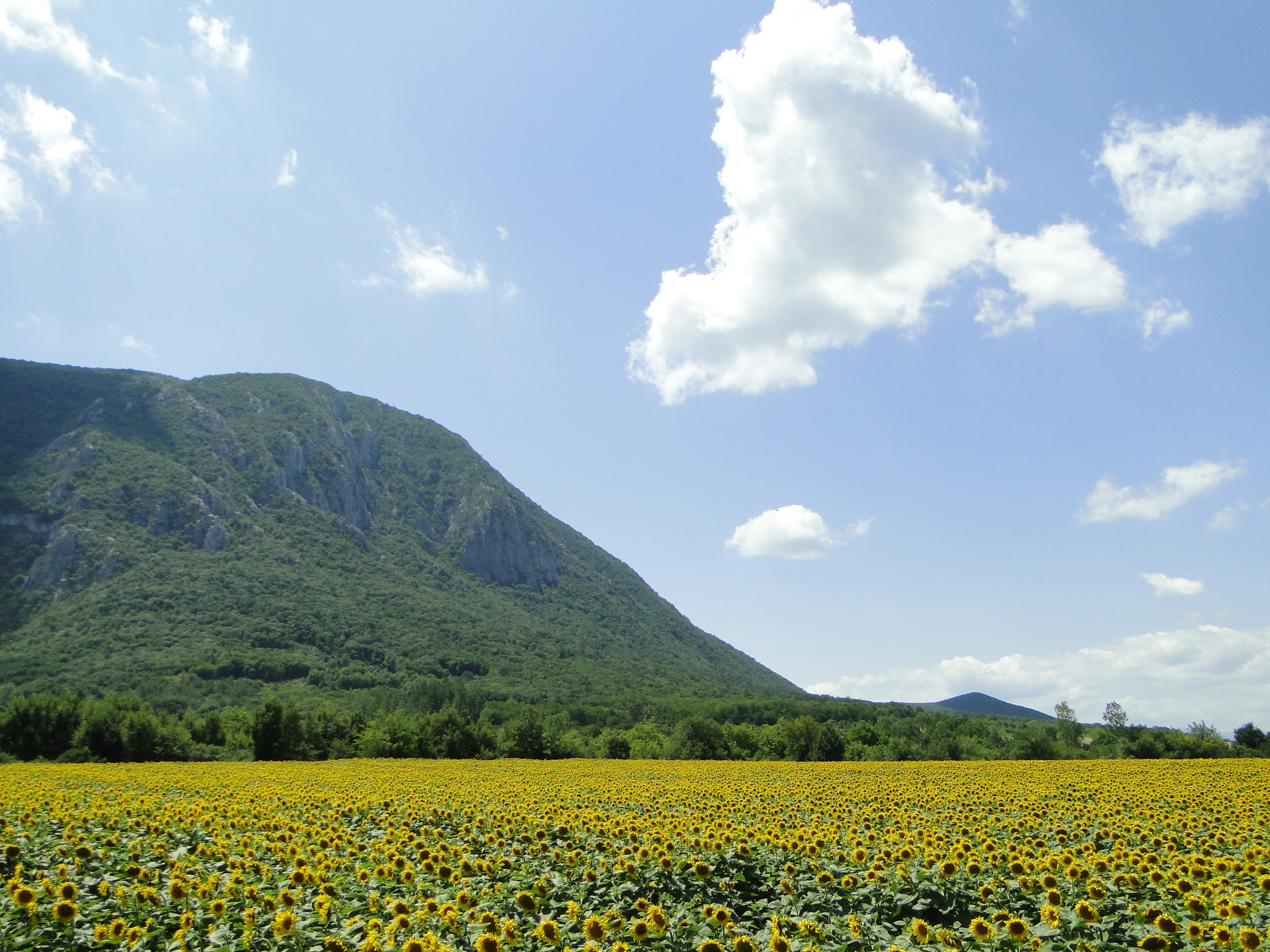
- Vratsa Province

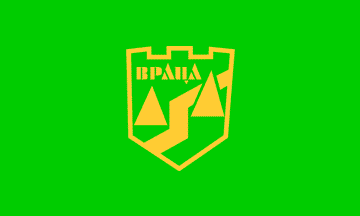
- Flag

- Location of Vratsa Province in Bulgaria
- Country: Bulgaria
- Capital: Vratsa

Area
  - Total: 3,619.7 km^{2} (1,397.6 sq mi)

Population (2022)
  - Total: 148,874
  - Density: 41.129/km^{2} (106.52/sq mi)
- Time zone: UTC+2 (EET)
  - Summer (DST): UTC+3 (EEST)
- License plate: BP
- Website: www.oblast.vratsa.bg

Vratsa Province (Bulgarian: Област Враца Oblast Vraca, former name Vraca okrug) is a Bulgarian province located in the northwestern part of the country, between Danube river in the north and Stara Planina mountain in the south. It is named after its main town: Vratsa. As of 2016, the province had a population of 170 367, on territory of 3,619.7 km^{2} (1,397.6 sq mi).

== Municipalities ==
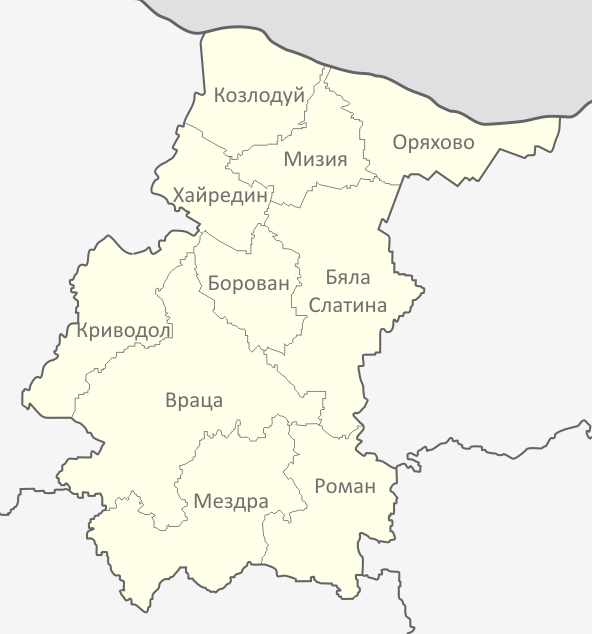
Municipalities of Vratsa Province

The Vratsa Province contains ten municipalities (singular: община, obshtina - plural: общини, obshtini). The following table shows the names of each municipality in English and Cyrillic, the main town (in bold) or village, and the population of each as of 2016.

Municipality	Cyrillic	Pop.	Town/Village	Pop.
Borovan	Борован	5,456	Borovan	2,646
Byala Slatina	Бяла Слатина	22,716	**Byala Slatina**	10,282
Vratsa	Враца	66,347	**Vratsa**	53,860
Kozloduy	Козлодуй	19,858	**Kozloduy**	12,295
Krivodol	Криводол	9,116	**Krivodol**	2,750
Mezdra	Мездра	19,663	**Mezdra**	9,628
Mizia	Мизия	6,611	**Mizia**	2,850
Oryahovo	Оряхово	10,204	**Oryahovo**	4,544
Roman	Роман	5,853	**Roman**	2,581
Hayredin	Хайредин	4,546	Hayredin	1,584

== Demographics ==
Historical population
Year	Pop.	±%
1946	289,811	—
1956	292,555	+0.9%
1965	294,090	+0.5%
1975	275,428	−6.3%
1985	267,403	−2.9%
1992	252,039	−5.7%
2001	225,957	−10.3%
2011	186,848	−17.3%
2021	152,813	−18.2%
Source: pop-stat.mashke.org

The Vratsa province had a population of 243,036 according to a 2001 census, of which 49.1% were male and 50.9% were female.

As of the end of 2009, the population of the province, announced by the Bulgarian National Statistical Institute, numbered 196,829 of which 27.2% are inhabitants aged over 60 years.

=== Ethnic groups ===
Ethnic groups in Vratsa Province (2011 census)
Ethnic group	Percentage
Bulgarians	92.7%
Romani	6.2%
others and indefinable	1.1%

Total population (2011 census): 186 848

Ethnic groups (2011 census): Identified themselves: 163 035 persons:

- Bulgarians: 151 183 (92,73%)
- Romani: 10 082 (6,18%)
- Others and indefinable: 1 770 (1,09%)

A further 23 000 persons in Vratsa Province did not declare their ethnic group at the 2011 census.

=== Religion ===
Religions in Vratsa Province (2001 census)
Religious group	Percentage
Orthodox Christian	94.4%
Muslim	1.7%
Roman Catholic Christian	0.5%
Protestant Christian	0.2%
others and indefinable	3.2%

Religious adherence in the province according to 2001 census:

Census 2001
religious adherence	population	%
Orthodox Christians	229,452	94.41%
Muslims	4,223	1.74%
Roman Catholics	1,116	0.46%
Protestants	394	0.16%
Other	995	0.41%
Religion not mentioned	6,856	2.82%
**total**	**243,036**	100%

== Infrastructure ==
=== Gas, water, electricity and telecommunications ===
The regional road system consists of 1,277 km (793 mi) of the republican road system. Predominating are the 4th class roads. Their maintenance and control are under the responsibilities of the municipalities. The rehabilitation of these roads is a priority of the regional policy. Mezdra is a key railway station connecting the major cities in Bulgaria. The passenger's transport is ensured by 116 buses and 26 trolleys. The telecommunication network consists of 4 regional post stations - Vratsa, Byala Slatina, Mezdra and Kozloduy, and 116 local post offices. They offer universal post services including express mail and international courier services EMS, SKYPAK and DHL. In the town of Vratsa there are branch offices of Mobiltel, Globul and Vivatel. The water supply system was envisaged to be improved and sewerage was mostly built, but there is a program for modernization all over the province, including the smaller villages. The nuclear power plant in Kozloduy, in the northern part of the province, is the major supplier of electricity in Bulgaria.

=== Roads, railroads and airports ===
The administrative capital of the province is Vratsa in the southern parts, about 116 km (72 mi) from Sofia. The distance to the major cities is as follows: Vratsa - Varna 414 km, Vratsa - Plovdiv 217 km; Vratsa - Pleven 108 km; Vratsa - Burgas 416 km. The international road E79 passes through the province. The major European port and ferry complex Oryahovo-Bechet, on the river Danube, is situated in Oryahovo municipality.

== Workforce ==
The economically active population is 48,892, employed as follows: in the services sector - 27,685, in the industry - 19,020, in the agriculture - 2,187. The population has increased since the year 2000, and are mostly in private labour employment. The rate of unemployment is higher than the Bulgarian average, and the aim of the provincial policy is to implement programs to resolve this problem. The labour force distribution in the basic economic sectors is the following - in the industry - 38.9%, in the agriculture - 4.5% and in services - 56.6%. The decrease of the number and relative share of the employees in the public sector is matched by an increase in the private sector. The proportion of workforce in state and private sectors is 44.2% to 55.8%. The higher level of education stipulates a higher employment rate. In the province predominates the number of employees of secondary education. On the labour market, the number of specialists of higher education decreases in favour of those without education. The average salary level for the province is 297 levs.

== Current priority industry sectors ==
The natural peculiarities of Vratsa Province contribute to the development of agriculture, lumber industry and electricity production. Major companies are the Kozloduy Nuclear Power Plant, of national importance; Chimco AD - fertilizer factory, Beloizvorski cement - cement factory and brewery; Ledenika AD - joint stock company; Centromet AD - centrifugal casting; Vratitsa LTD - yarns, raw and finished fabrics, sewing articles; OMK Holding - machining and machinery, tooling equipment, foundry, special production; Hemus-M AD - limestone, slabs, tiles, blocks, columns; Sunnytex AD - production of household linen, weaving etc.; Metizi AD - steel wires, ropes and their products, spare parts; Variana LTD - concrete articles, greyiron cast, metal safes; Enemona Holding - civil engineering.

== Sectors for development ==
The main projects are related to the development of the transport infrastructure, water supply and sewerage, agriculture - vegetables, cattle breeding, silk-worm breeding, mushroom cultivation, development and strengthening of the existing industrial plants, development of alternative forms of tourism - rural, ecotourism, cultural, religious, spaeology, mountaineering, hang gliding etc. The long-term strategy for the regional economy is to promote small and medium enterprises as an alternative way to develop the industry.

== Schools, universities and job training ==
Because of the close distance to the capital Sofia (site of the main universities in Bulgaria), only one local centre of New Bulgarian University, one pedagogical college - branch of the Veliko Tarnovo University and one medical college exists in the province. The vocational schools have their main disciplines mostly in agricultural techniques, mechanics and electrotechnics, chemical technologies, civil engineering and construction, language school and mathematical secondary school. The total number of primary schools in the province is 54, 14 of them situated in the municipality of Vratsa and all state-owned. There is only one private school, Europe Schools for English Language and Management.

== Financial institutions ==
At present, there are 15 branches of Bulgarian banks. The insurance companies have their 12 branches in the province.

== Hospitals ==
The medical services are provided in 6 hospitals - 2 of them in the main city of the province, Vratsa. As a result of the reforms in health care, there are also private medical services available, as well as stomatological services.

== Culture, recreation and resources ==
Three hotels are available within the province - Valdi Palace, Hotel Tourist in the town and Vratsa, and Hotel Istar in the town of Kozloduy. In the surroundings of Vratsa - 12 kilometres inside the mountain there is a modern centre for recreation with facilities such as sauna, fitness suite and others. Within the territory of the province is the Vrachanski Balkan Natural Park that offers excellent opportunities for recreation; there is Vrachanski Karst reserve, the cave Ledenika of international importance, and the Vratsa Gorge near the town of Vratsa.

== See also ==
- Provinces of Bulgaria
- List of villages in Vratsa Province
