= Lom (river) =

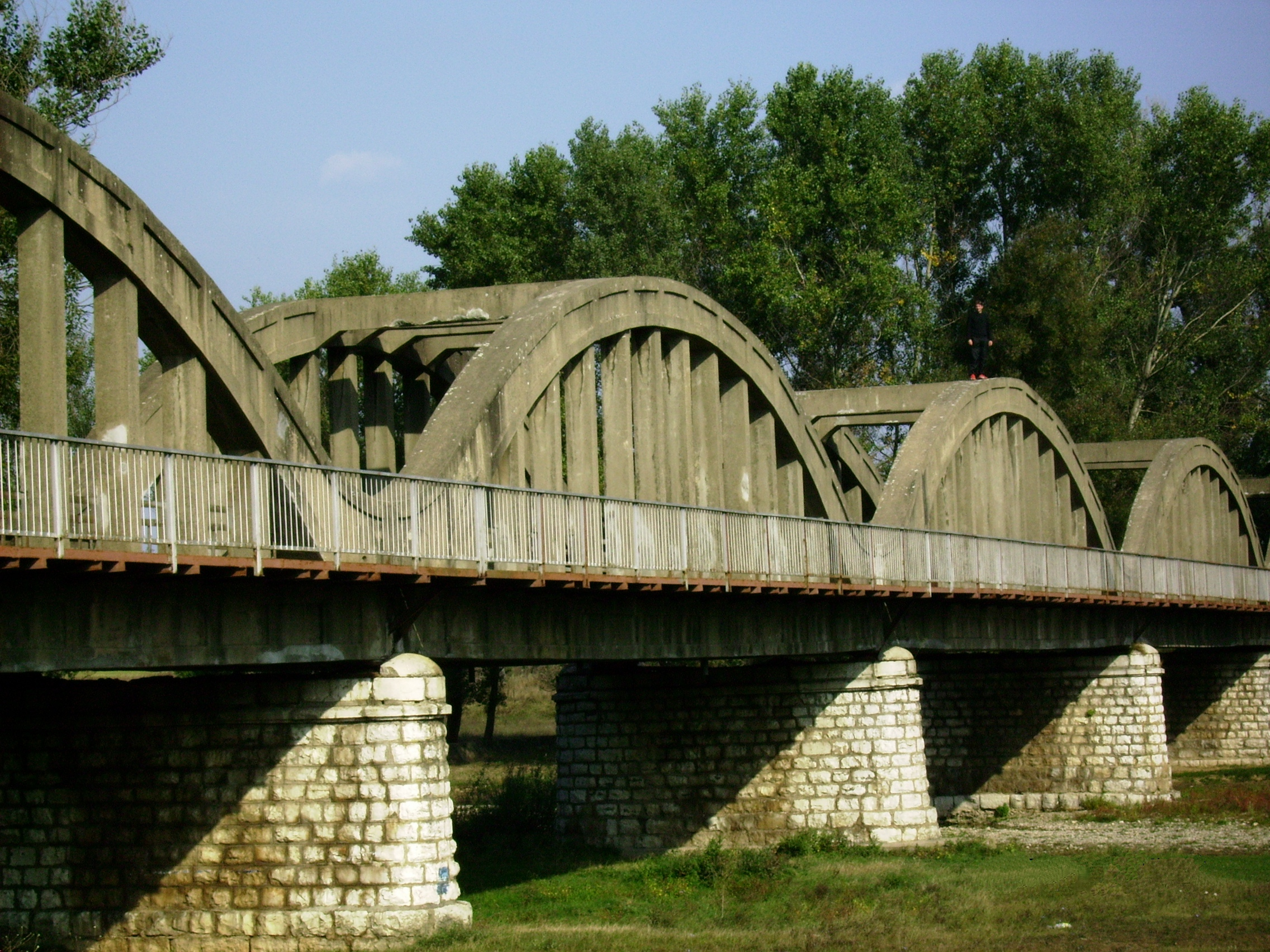
- The Italian-built bridge over the Lom at Kriva Bara

Location
- Country: Bulgaria

Physical characteristics
- Source
  - location: N of Midzhur, Balkan Mountains
  - coordinates: 43°23′42″N 22°40′58.08″E
  - elevation: 2,100 m (6,900 ft)
- Mouth
  - location: Danube
  - coordinates: 43°50′9.96″N 23°14′57.84″E
  - elevation: 28 m (92 ft)
- Length: 93 km (58 mi)
- Basin size: 1,240 km^{2} (480 sq mi)

Basin features
- Progression: Danube→ Black Sea

The Lom (Bulgarian: Лом [ˈɫɔm], Latin: Almus) is a river in the western part of the Danubian Plain of northwestern Bulgaria. A right tributary of the Danube, the river is 93 km long.

== Geography ==
The river takes its source at an altitude of 2,100 m on the northern foothills of Midzhur (2,168 m), the highest in the western Balkan Mountains, situated on the Bulgaria–Serbia border. Until the village of Gorni Lom the river flows in direction north–northeast in a deep valley with steep slopes. The longitudinal gradient in that section is high, averaging at 10%. The river bed is rocky and consists of stones, gravel and sand. The Lom enters the hilly fore-Balkan at the village of Dolni Lom flowing in almost flat terrain, where the gradient of the river is small. The valley is surrounded by low hills, the river banks are low and the bottom is covered with sand. After receiving its tributary the Stakevska reka and bending northeast, the river valley widens further, reaching 100–200 m at Drenovets. Downstream of Ruzhintsi the valley becomes asymmetrical with well-developed terraces on the left bank and steeper slopes on the right. The river bed is mostly covered with gravel. The Lom flows into the Danube at an altitude of 28 m at the homonymous town.

Its drainage basin covers a territory of 1,240 km^{2} and is situated between the basins of the rivers Archar and the Skomlya to the northwest, the Tsibritsa and the Ogosta to the southeast, and — along the main watershed on the ridge of the Balkan Mountain to the southwest — the Nišava and the Timok. The main tributaries and the Stakevska reka (34 km, left) and the Nechinska bara (28 km, ).

The high water is in March–May, due to the snowmelt and the spring rains, and low water is in July–October. The average annual discharge is 4.7 m^{3}/s at Drenovets, 7.39 m^{3}/s at Traykovo and 6.4 m^{3}/s at the mouth.

== Settlements and economy ==
The river flows in Vidin and Montana Provinces. It passes through one town and 18 villages — Gorni Lom, Dolni Lom, Sredogriv, Yanyovets, Ruzhintsi, Drazhintsi, Belo Pole, Roglets, Drenovets, Topolovets and Dinkovo in Vidin Province, and Knyazheva Mahala, Kriva Bara, Dondukovo, Vasilovtsi, Staliyska mahala, Traykovo, Zamfir and the town of Lom in Montana Province. Its waters are utilized for irrigation and small-scale electricity production.

There two roads along the Lom valley, the third class III-102 road Montana–Belogradchik–Dimovo in the section between Gorni Lom and Yanyovets, and the third class III-102 road Lom–Ruzhintsi–Chuprene in the section between Yanyovets and Lom.
