= Nechinska bara =

Location
- Country: Bulgaria

Physical characteristics
- Source
  - location: Shiroka Planina, Pre-Balkan
  - coordinates: 43°30′39.96″N 22°51′15.12″E
  - elevation: 476 m (1,562 ft)
- Mouth
  - location: Lom
  - coordinates: 43°42′12.96″N 23°6′1.08″E
  - elevation: 77 m (253 ft)
- Length: 30 km (19 mi)
- Basin size: 222 km^{2} (86 sq mi)

Basin features
- Progression: Lom→ Danube

The Nechinska bara (Bulgarian: Нечинска бара) is a river in northwestern Bulgaria, a right tributary of the Lom, itself a right tributary of the Danube. Its length is 30 km.

The river takes its source under the name Gyurgichka bara at an altitude of 476 m on the northern slopes of the Shiroka Planina division of the Pre-Balkan range, a system of low-lying mountains and hills between the Balkan Mountains and the Danubian Plain. It flows north in a deep forested valley until the Gyurgich Reservoir. Downstream of the village of Gyurgich its turns northeast. The river takes its main tributary the Karachitsa shortly before the crossing of the first class I-102 road Vidin–Montana. It flows into the Lom at an altitude of 77 m near the village of Dondukovo.

Its drainage basin covers a territory of 222 km^{2}, or 17.9% of the Lom's total.

The Nechinska bara flows in Montana and Vidin Provinces. There are four settlements along its course, the village of Gyurgich in Ruzhintsi Municipality of Vidin Province, as well as the villages of Bukovets and Smirnenski and the town of Brusartsi in Brusartsi Municipality of Montana Province. Its waters are utilised for irrigation.
