= Chuprene Municipality =

Chuprene Municipality Община Чупрене
- Municipality
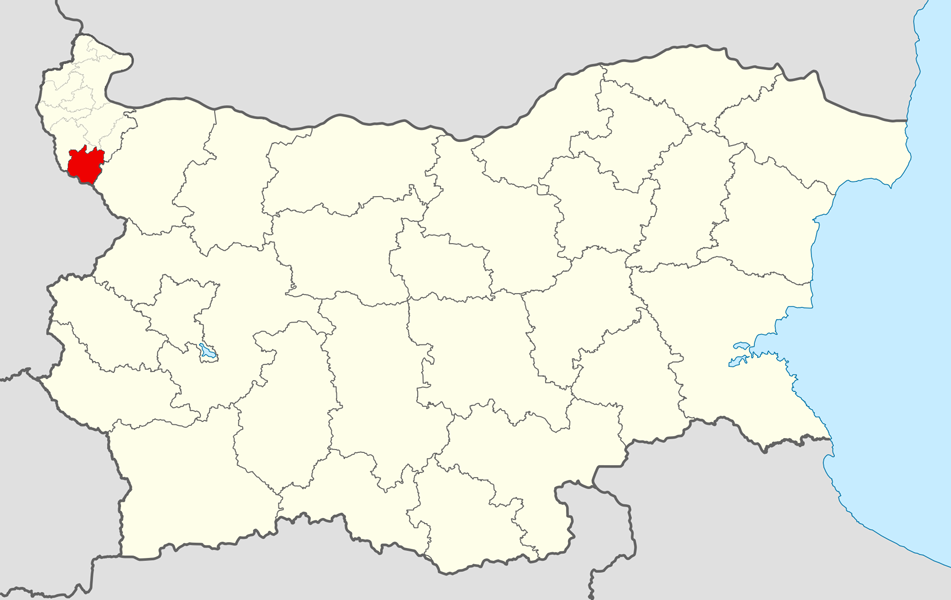
- Chuprene Municipality within Bulgaria and Vidin Province.
- Coordinates: 43°29′N 22°41′E
- Country: Bulgaria
- Province (Oblast): Vidin
- Admin. centre (Obshtinski tsentar): Chuprene

Area
  - Total: 330 km^{2} (130 sq mi)

Population (December 2009)
  - Total: 2,285
  - Density: 6.9/km^{2} (18/sq mi)
- Time zone: UTC+2 (EET)
  - Summer (DST): UTC+3 (EEST)

Chuprene Municipality (Bulgarian: Община Чупрене) is a frontier municipality (obshtina) in Vidin Province, Northwestern Bulgaria, located in the vicinity of the western parts of Stara Planina range in the so-called Fore-Balkan area. It is named after its administrative centre - the village of Chuprene. In the southwest, the municipality borders on Republic of Serbia.

The area embraces a territory of 330 km^{2} (130 sq mi) with a population of 2,285 inhabitants, as of December 2009.

Midzhur peak, 2,168 m (7,113 ft), the highest point of the western Balkan Mountains, is located in the municipality almost on the very border with Serbia.

== Settlements ==
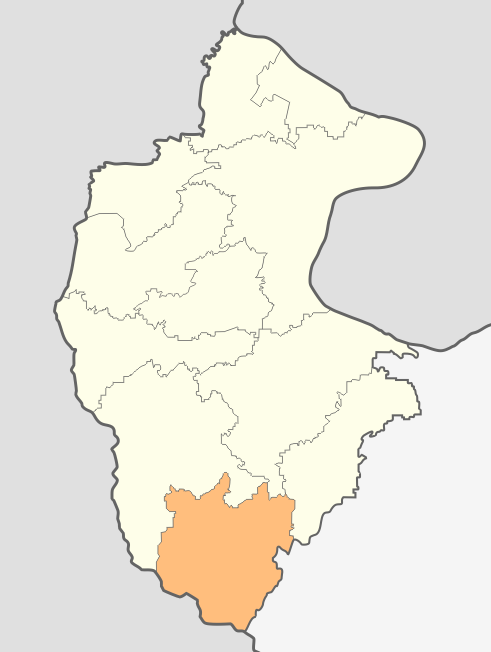
Chuprene Municipality within Vidin Province

Chuprene Municipality includes the following 9 places all of them villages:

Town/Village	Cyrillic	Population (December 2009)
Chuprene	Чупрене	576
Dolni Lom	Долни Лом	229
Gorni Lom	Горни Лом	777
Protopopintsi	Протопопинци	91
Replyana	Репляна	193
Sredogriv	Средогрив	129
Targovishte	Търговище	162
Varbovo	Върбово	128
Total		2,285

== Demography ==
The following table shows the change of the population during the last four decades.

Chuprene Municipality
Year	1975	1985	1992	2001	2005	2007	2009	2011
Population	5,612	4,439	3,778	3,004	2,580	2,399	2,285	2,083
Sources: Census 2001, Census 2011, „pop-stat.mashke.org“,

=== Religion ===
According to the latest Bulgarian census of 2011, the religious composition, among those who answered the optional question on religious identification, was the following:

Religious composition of Chuprene Municipality
Orthodox Christianity	82.5%
Catholicism	0.0%
Protestantism	0.2%
Islam	0.0%
No religion	14.2%
Prefer not to answer, others and indefinable	3.1%

An overwhelming majority of the population of Chuprene Municipality identify themselves as Christians. At the 2011 census, 82.5% of respondents identified as Orthodox Christians belonging to the Bulgarian Orthodox Church.

== See also ==
- Provinces of Bulgaria
- Municipalities of Bulgaria
- List of cities and towns in Bulgaria
