= Vasilovtsi =

Vasilovtsi (Bulgarian: Василовци, also Vasilovci or Wassilowzi) may refer to:

- Vasilovtsi, Montana Province
- Vasilovtsi, Sofia Province
