= Ruzhintsi =

Ruzhintsi Ружинци
- Location of Ruzhintsi
- Coordinates: 43°37′N 22°49′E
- Country: Bulgaria
- Provinces (Oblast): Vidin

Government
  - Mayor: Ventsislav Vankov
- Elevation: 181 m (594 ft)

Population (2008)
  - Total: 953
- Time zone: UTC+2 (EET)
  - Summer (DST): UTC+3 (EEST)
- Postal Code: 3930
- Area code: 09324

Ruzhintsi (Bulgarian: Ружинци, pronounced [ˈruʒint͡si]; also transliterated Ružinci, Ruzhinci, Ruzhintzi, Rujinci, Rujintsi, Rujintzi, etc.) is a village in northwestern Bulgaria, part of Vidin Province. It is the administrative centre of the homonymous Ruzhintsi Municipality, which lies in the southeastern part of Vidin Province. Ruzhintsi is located 54 kilometres from the provincial capital Vidin and 43 kilometres from Montana.

== History ==
The village may have been founded in the 14th century. There are several etymologies suggested, two from Proto-Indo-European *h₁reudʰ-ó- ("red"): from ruzha ("rose") or from the dialectal verb oruzhavam ("burn down"), and one involving the name of Fruzhin, son of Bulgarian tsar Ivan Shishman and organizer of the anti-Ottoman Uprising of Konstantin and Fruzhin in the early 15th century. The village church was built in 1852 together with a monastical school.

== Municipality ==
Ruzhintsi municipality has an area of 232 square kilometres and includes the following 10 places:

- Belo Pole
- Cherno Pole
- Dinkovo
- Drazhintsi
- Drenovets
- Gyurgich
- Pleshivets
- Roglets
- Ruzhintsi
- Topolovets

The municipality is mainly agricultural. The only river that crosses it is the Lom River, but there are several water reservoirs: at Gyurgich, Drazhintsi and Drenovets, with two smaller ones at Gyurgich and Belo Pole. A sight in the area is the Dobri Dol Monastery, founded in the 11th century.
