= Smirnenski =

Smirnenski may refer to:

Places:

- Smirnenski, Montana Province - a village in Brusartsi municipality, Montana Province, Bulgaria
- Smirnenski, Rousse Province - a village in Vetovo municipality, Rousse Province, Bulgaria

Surname:

- Hristo Smirnenski (1898–1923), a Bulgarian poet and writer
