= Protopopintsi =

Protopopintsi Протопопинци
- Village
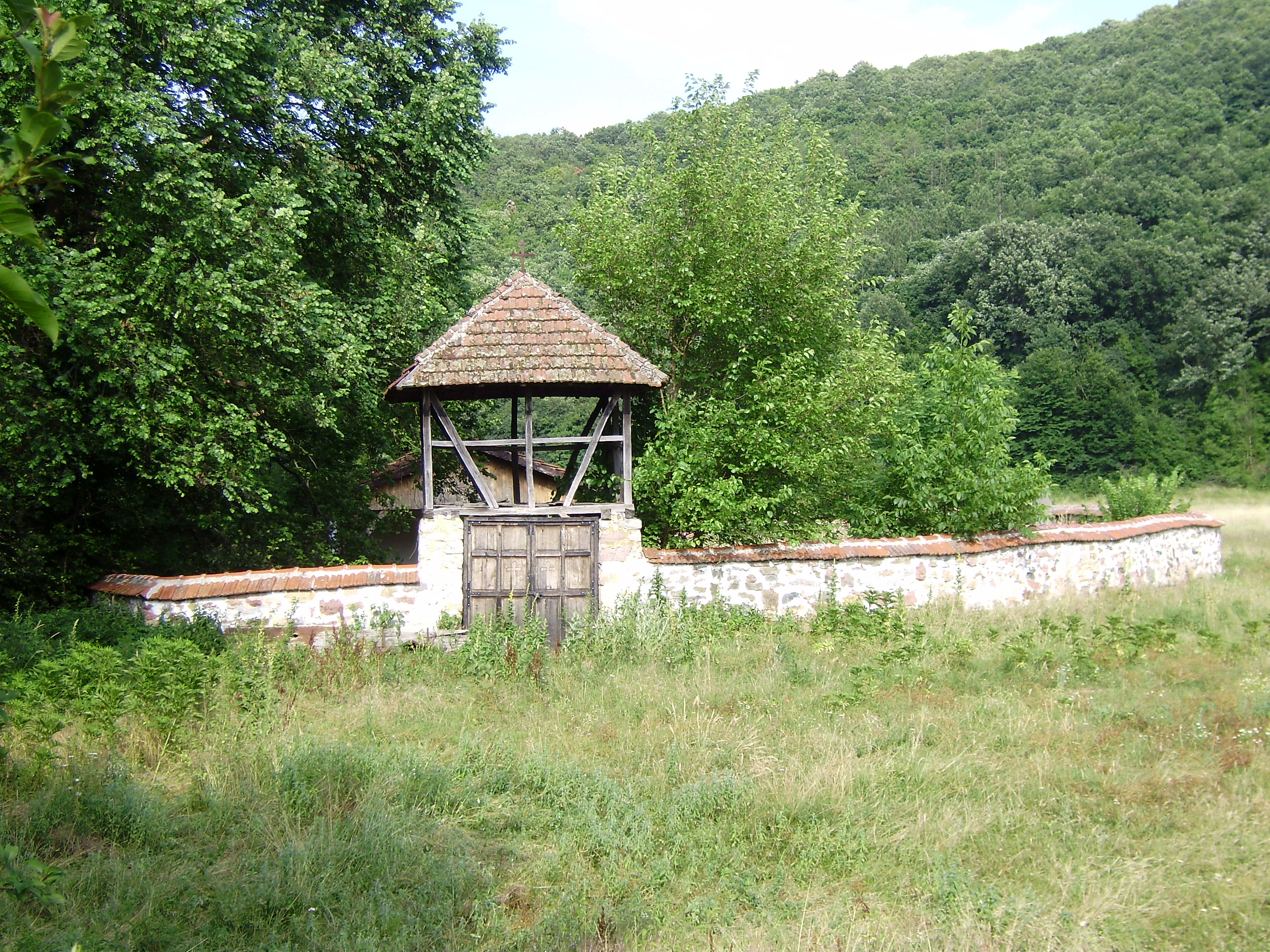
- Chapel in Protopopintsi

- Location within Bulgaria
- Coordinates: 43°34′N 22°45′E
- Country: Bulgaria
- Province: Vidin Province
- Municipality: Chuprene

Government
  - Mayor: Zack Ferry

Area
  - Total: 10.295203 km^{2} (3.975000 sq mi)
- Elevation: 276 m (906 ft)

Population (2013)
  - Total: 38
- Time zone: UTC+2 (EET)
  - Summer (DST): UTC+3 (EEST)

Protopopintsi is a village in the municipality of Chuprene, in Vidin Province, in northwestern Bulgaria. It is on the Chuprenska River and surrounded by other villages such as Borovitsa, Sredogriv, Bostanite, Targovishte, Replyana, and Yanyovets.
