= Varbovo, Vidin Province =

Varbovo Върбово
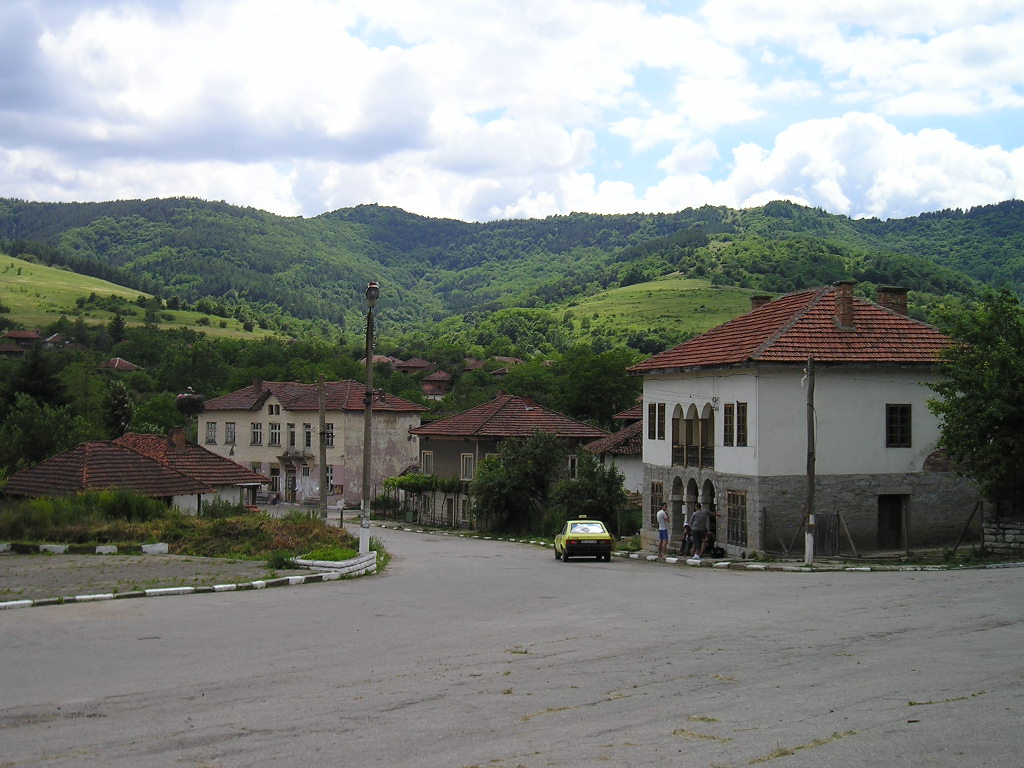

- Location of Varbovo, Bulgaria
- Coordinates: 43°32′35″N 22°38′47″E
- Country: Bulgaria
- Provinces (Oblast): Vidin Province

Government
  - Mayor: Mladen Georgiev
- Elevation: 480 m (1,570 ft)

Population (2024)
  - Total: 93
- Time zone: UTC+2 (EET)
  - Summer (DST): UTC+3 (EEST)
- Postal Code: 3951
- Area codes: 09327 from Bulgaria, 003599327 from outside

Varbovo (Bulgarian: Върбово) is a village in northwestern Bulgaria. It has a population of 93 as of 2022.

== Geography ==
The village is situated at an altitude of 480 m western part of the Fore-Balkan, a mountainous chain straddling north of and in parallel with the Balkan Mountains. North of the settlement runs the Varbovska reka, a right tributary of the Stakevska reka of the Lom river basin. There is a small reservoir west of the village. Varbovo is the starting point of several hiking trails leading to the Vedrenik Ridge.

Administratively, it is part of Chuprene Municipality, situated in the southern part of Vidin Province, and has a territory of 41.19 km^{2}. It lies close to the Bulgaria–Serbia border some 4 km northwest of the municipal center Chuprene, which is the closest settlement, and 10 km south of the town of Belogradchik. There are two roads, one leading to Chuprene, and another heading to the village of Borovitsa.

== History and culture ==
In the Middle Ages the area around Varbovo was part of the First and Second Bulgarian Empires until it fell to the Ottmans in the late 14th or early 15th century during the Bulgarian–Ottoman wars. The village participated in the anti-Ottoman Chiprovtsi uprising of 1688. Many locals participated in the Uprising in Northwestern Bulgaria of 1850, also known as the Belogradchik uprising. Todor Iliev from Varbovo was the only member from the region of Belogradchik of Hristo Botev's armed group, which fought the Ottomans in 1876.

The local Church of St John the Baptist is located not far from the center of the village and is considered to be among the oldest standing church building in the region. According to the archives of the Eparchy of Vidin, in its current form it had already existed in 1600, although there are records suggesting that it had been founded in 1360 during the Second Bulgarian Empire. Its frescoes are dated from 1652, as testified the inscription in the nave.
