= Lom, Bulgaria =

Lom Лом
- Coat of arms

- Location of Lom, Bulgaria
- Coordinates: 43°49′32″N 23°14′15″E
- Country: Bulgaria
- Province (Oblast): Montana

Government
  - Mayor: Tsvetan Petrov

Area
  - Total: 52.203 km^{2} (20.156 sq mi)
- Elevation: 20 m (66 ft)

Population (2021)
  - Total: 18,593
  - Density: 356.17/km^{2} (922.47/sq mi)
- Time zone: UTC+2 (EET)
  - Summer (DST): UTC+3 (EEST)
- Postal Code: 3600
- Area code: 0971
- Website: Official website

Lom (Bulgarian: Лом [ˈɫɔm]) is a town in northwestern Bulgaria, part of Montana Province, situated on the right bank of the Danube, close to the estuary of the Lom River. It is the administrative centre of the eponymous Lom Municipality. The town is 162 km (101 mi) north of Sofia, 56 km (35 mi) southeast of Vidin, 50 km (31 mi) north of Montana, and 42 km (26 mi) west of Kozloduy. It is the second most important Bulgarian port on the Danube after Ruse.

== Geography ==
The town of Lom is located near the mouth of the eponymous river Lom. Its development as a large river port center, second in importance to Bulgaria after Ruse, is determined by the fact that it is the closest port to the capital.

== History ==
=== Antiquity and Middle Ages ===
Lom was founded by the Thracians under the name of Artanes in Antiquity.

The Romans built the fort of Almus (from where the name of the today's city and of the Lom River comes) on the Danubian Limes frontier system along the Danube. The town developed around it.

There are no reports proving that there existed a big settlement in the Middle Ages. It was not until Ottoman rule that it enlarged but for a long time it was under the shadow of the dominant towns of Vidin, Nikopol and Silistra. It is assumed that the Ottoman village was founded in 1695 by Kara Mustafa and Murad Giray, who were defeated at Vienna in 1683 and who came here sailing rafts along the Danube.

=== Ottoman rule and Bulgarian National Revival ===
The name Lom Palanka was mentioned for the first time in 1704. At the time, the name palanka was used for settlements that stood between village and city (grad) in size and importance. In 1798 Lom suffered from brigand raids. With the development of shipping along the Danube after 1830, the importance of the town grew. The road to Sofia contributed to its progress and turned it into a main export port to Vienna. By 1869 there were 120 shops, 148 trade offices, 175 food shops, 34 coffee bars, six hotels and two mills. The town was centred on the old Kale (fortress), which was entered through three kapii (gates), each named after the place that the respective road led to - Vidin, Belogradchik, Sofia. The tradesmen from Lom offered goods at the biggest fairs in the region and beyond. In 1880 there were 7,500 inhabitants in the town.

Lom is proud of its traditions from the period of the Bulgarian National Revival. During the Bulgarian National Revival, the first chitalishte in Bulgaria (1856) was founded in the town, the first women's society in the country was also established in 1858 and one of the first theatre performances took place in the town. Krastyu Pishurka, a noted educator, also worked in Lom.

Until the Second World War it was a major market town. In 1943, the Bulgarian government transported several thousand Jewish captives from Bulgarian-occupied territory in Greece and Yugoslavia to Lom to be embarked on boats bound for Vienna in Nazi Germany, from where they were taken to be exterminated in Treblinka. Lom was the main hub for the first deportations of victims of the Holocaust from the Axis-aligned Balkans. After 1944 the industry developed — sugar factory, can factory, grain industry. It became a port for the northwestern part of Bulgaria.

== Neighbourhoods ==
Neighbourhoods of Lom include:

- Boruna
- Humata
- Kaletata
- Lyulyatsite
- Mladenovo
- Mladost
- Momin brod
- Stadiona
- Zornitsa

== Landmarks ==
- Plazha (Bulgarian: Плажа) - the 500 m. long pebbled beach at the bank of the Danube River, 3 km. from the centre of the city
- Town Museum of History, housed in the building of the old town-hall.
- Preserved foundations of the antique fortress Almus
- Postoyanstvo, the oldest chitalishte (community centre) in Bulgaria
- Building of the former School of Pedagogy
- The Church of Boruna
- Monument of Tseko Voivoda (1807–1881), a participant in the battles for liberation of Serbia and proclaimed by the Serbian government to be a voyvoda (revolutionary leader)

== Religion ==
The majority of the population of Lom is Christian Orthodox. The second biggest religious group is Protestantism-adventists and baptists.

== Climate ==
Climate data for Lom (1961–1990) Elevation: 33m
| Month | Jan | Feb | Mar | Apr | May | Jun | Jul | Aug | Sep | Oct | Nov | Dec | Year |
|---|---|---|---|---|---|---|---|---|---|---|---|---|---|
| Mean daily maximum °C (°F) | 2.0 (35.6) | 4.4 (39.9) | 10.5 (50.9) | 17.6 (63.7) | 22.6 (72.7) | 26.1 (79.0) | 28.4 (83.1) | 27.8 (82.0) | 24.0 (75.2) | 17.0 (62.6) | 9.6 (49.3) | 4.3 (39.7) | 16.2 (61.1) |
| Daily mean °C (°F) | −0.9 (30.4) | 1.3 (34.3) | 6.2 (43.2) | 12.4 (54.3) | 17.4 (63.3) | 21.1 (70.0) | 22.6 (72.7) | 22.0 (71.6) | 18.2 (64.8) | 11.9 (53.4) | 6.1 (43.0) | 1.4 (34.5) | 11.6 (53.0) |
| Mean daily minimum °C (°F) | −3.7 (25.3) | −1.3 (29.7) | 2.1 (35.8) | 7.6 (45.7) | 12.4 (54.3) | 15.6 (60.1) | 17.0 (62.6) | 16.5 (61.7) | 11.3 (52.3) | 7.6 (45.7) | 3.0 (37.4) | 1.2 (34.2) | 7.4 (45.4) |
| Average precipitation mm (inches) | 38.0 (1.50) | 43.0 (1.69) | 45.0 (1.77) | 49.0 (1.93) | 58.0 (2.28) | 67.0 (2.64) | 40.0 (1.57) | 34.0 (1.34) | 34.0 (1.34) | 37.0 (1.46) | 51.0 (2.01) | 47.0 (1.85) | 543 (21.38) |
| Average rainy days | 4 | 5 | 8 | 9 | 8 | 6 | 3 | 4 | 5 | 7 | 8 | 6 | 73 |
| Average relative humidity (%) | 80 | 79 | 74 | 70 | 71 | 72 | 70 | 70 | 73 | 78 | 81 | 82 | 75 |
| Mean monthly sunshine hours | 64 | 78 | 128 | 180 | 232 | 268 | 303 | 283 | 216 | 148 | 86 | 67 | 2,053 |
Source: NOAA

== Notable people ==
=== Born in Lom ===
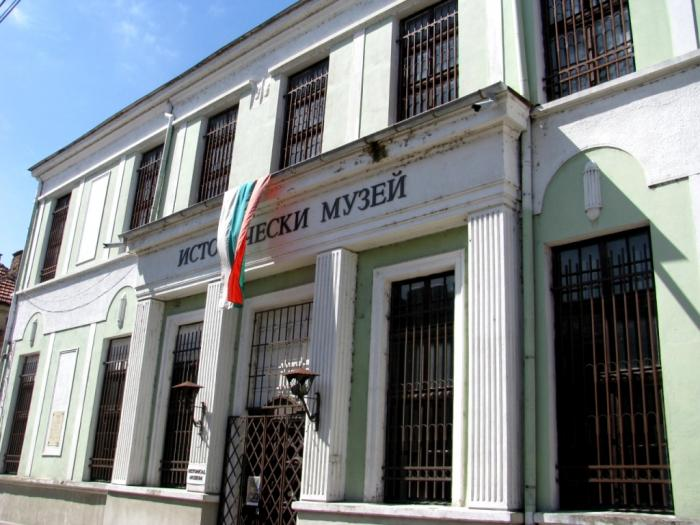
History museum in Lom

- Aleksandar Belev (1898 – 1944), politician
- Alexander Raichev, composer
- Vladimir Shkodrov (1930 – 2010), astronomer
- Mariyan Ognyanov (1988 –), footballer
- Milcho Goranov (1928 – 2008), footballer, bronze medalist
- Mihail Kantardzhiev (1910 – 2002), chess player

=== Others, connected with Lom ===
- Louis-Emil Eyer (1865 – 1916), Swiss, co-founder of the sport movement in Bulgaria, physical education teacher
- Jonas Basanavičius (1851 – 1927), Lithuanian popular figure
- Dimitar Spisarevski (1916 – 1943), fighter pilot in the Second World War

== Honour ==
Lom Peak on Livingston Island in the South Shetland Islands, Antarctica is named after Lom.

== Municipality ==
The municipality of Lom consists of the following 9 villages plus the town of Lom itself, which is the administrative centre of the municipality.

- Dobri dol
- Dolno Linevo
- Kovachitsa
- Lom
- Orsoya
- Slivata
- Staliyska mahala
- Stanevo
- Traykovo
- Zamfir

== Twin towns – sister cities ==
Lom is twinned with:

- Băilești, Romania
- Debar, North Macedonia
- Pantelej (Niš), Serbia
- Moudania, Greece
