= Lom Municipality =

Lom Municipality Община Лом
- Municipality
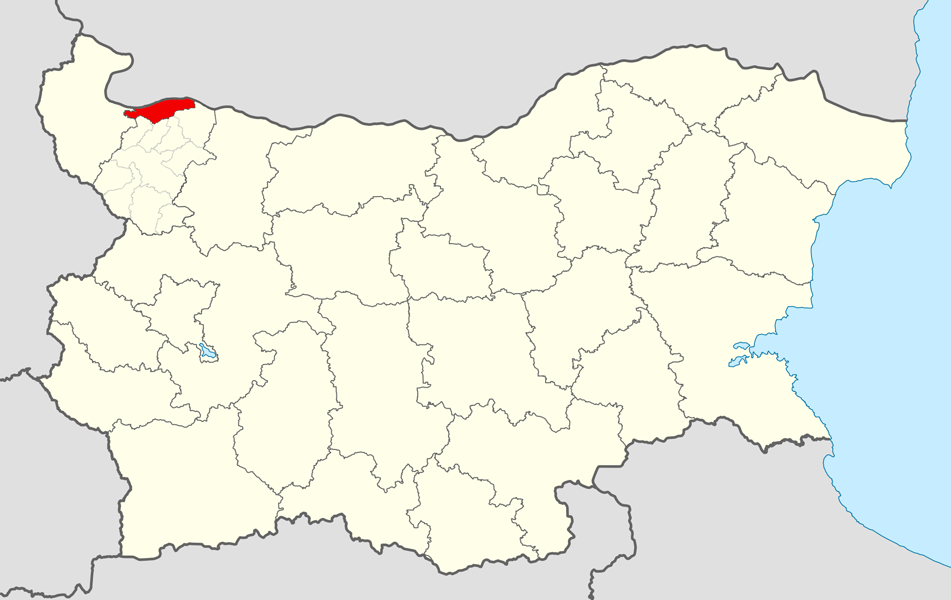
- Lom Municipality within Bulgaria and Montana Province.
- Coordinates: 43°48′N 23°16′E
- Country: Bulgaria
- Province (Oblast): Montana
- Admin. centre (Obshtinski tsentar): Lom

Area
  - Total: 323.89 km^{2} (125.05 sq mi)

Population (Census February 2011)
  - Total: 27,294
  - Density: 84.269/km^{2} (218.26/sq mi)
- Time zone: UTC+2 (EET)
  - Summer (DST): UTC+3 (EEST)

Lom Municipality (Bulgarian: Община Лом) is a frontier municipality (obshtina) in Montana Province, Northwestern Bulgaria, located along the right bank of Danube river in the Danubian Plain. It is named after its administrative centre — the town of Lom which is one of the important Bulgarian river ports. The area borders Romania across the Danube.

The municipality encompasses a territory of 323.89 km^{2} (125.05 sq mi) with a population of 27,294 inhabitants, as of February 2011.

== Settlements ==
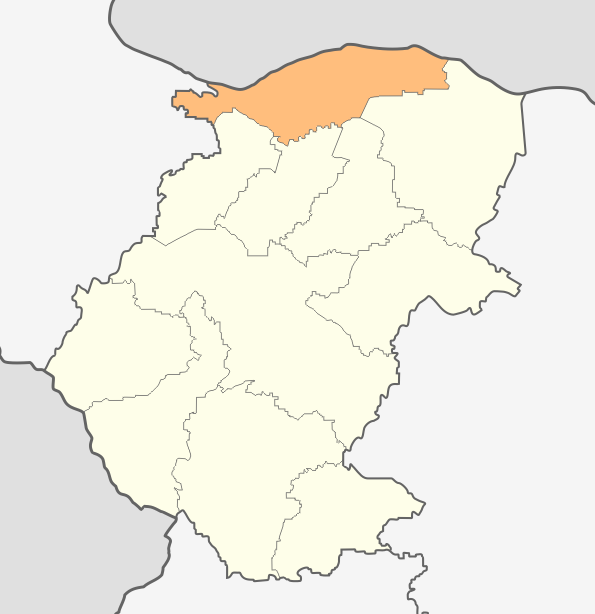
Lom Municipality within Montana Province

Lom Municipality includes the following 10 places (towns are shown in bold):

Town/Village	Cyrillic	Population (December 2009)
**Lom**	**Лом**	24,300
Dobri Dol	Добри дол	334
Dolno Linevo	Долно Линево	266
Kovachitsa	Ковачица	1,255
Orsoya	Орсоя	133
Slivata	Сливата	225
Staliyska Mahala	Сталийска махала	1,369
Stanevo	Станево	364
Traykovo	Трайково	932
Zamfir	Замфир	1,020
Total		30,198

== Demography ==
The following table shows the change of the population during the last four decades.

Lom Municipality
**Year**	1975	1985	1992	**2001**	2005	2007	2009	**2011**
**Population**	43,672	42,950	40,262	35,077	32,135	31,170	30,198	27,294
Sources: Census 2001, Census 2011, „pop-stat.mashke.org“,

=== Religion ===
According to the latest Bulgarian census of 2011, the religious composition, among those who answered the optional question on religious identification, was the following:

Religious composition of Lom Municipality
Orthodox Christianity	56.3%
Catholicism	0.4%
Protestantism	6.1%
Islam	0.1%
No religion	8.0%
Prefer not to answer, others and indefinable	29.1%

== See also ==
- Provinces of Bulgaria
- Municipalities of Bulgaria
- List of cities and towns in Bulgaria
