= 2014 Gorni Lom explosions =

Munitions factory disaster in Bulgaria

- Date: 1 October 2014
- Time: (14:59 GMT) 16:59 local
- Location: Gorni Lom, Bulgaria; 43°29′0″N 22°45′0″E
- Deaths: 15
- Injuries: 3

The 2014 Gorni Lom explosions were a series of explosions that began on the afternoon of October 1, 2014, at 16:59 pm local time at the former Midzhur Ammo Plant in the village of Gorni Lom, in Bulgaria's northwestern Vidin Province. The series of blasts completely destroyed the factory, killing 13 men and 2 women who were inside and injuring three others who were some distance away. As a result of the blast, October 3 was declared a day of national mourning in the country.

== Timeline and background ==
2014 Gorni Lom explosions (Bulgaria)

The main explosion took place at 16:59 pm local time, with a large secondary blast taking place at 21:45 pm. The approximately 15 people who were working inside the factory at the time of the first explosion are presumed to have died instantly, while three female workers in the vicinity of the complex suffered injuries from flying glass and shrapnel. Authorities estimated around 10 tonnes of highly explosive chemicals were stored at the site, in addition to the weapons being dismantled. According to Nikola Nikolov, the head of the interior ministry's civil defense force, the blasts were powerful enough to completely destroy the main buildings in the plant, leaving huge craters the size of football fields behind and sending debris flying up to a kilometer away. The workers were reportedly dismantling old Greek mines at the time of the explosions in Gorni Lom, approximately 145 km northwest of Bulgaria's capital Sofia.

The same plant had received several urgent citations by authorities just two months prior to the explosion, notifying the owners of outdated equipment, improperly stored explosives and a larger amount of munitions at the site than it could safely handle. The same plant suffered two blasts in 2007 and 2010 that injured a total of six people and flattened two separate buildings. In the aftermath of the disaster labor minister Yordan Hristoskov vowed to never allow the factory to reopen, placing the future of around 150 jobs in question and prompting condemnation from local residents.

This was Bulgaria's tenth such incident since 1979 and the second one in just two months, after a blast at a similar plant in Kostenets injured 10 people on August 8. An explosion at another facility near Sliven killed 3 people in 2012, and in 2008 a series of huge blasts at an arms depot near Sofia injured 3, forced the closure of Sofia Airport and registered as a 3.2 tremor on seismographs.

== Response and aftermath ==
In response to the disaster, authorities dispatched Army units equipped with drones and thermal cameras to search for survivors and assess the damage. After a period of 24 hours since the last explosion had passed, investigators were allowed access to the scene and began their work, making the initial trip in a Bulgarian Army Plasan Sand Cat vehicle as a safety precaution. One of the members of that initial team, Valentin Radev, said that "the plant and the people seem to have just vanished" and described the scene as a "moonscape". October 3 was declared an official day of mourning in Bulgaria, with festivities cancelled and all flags flown at half-mast.

The explosion took place just four days before the scheduled parliamentary election, and at least one political party called for its postponement. Most parties canceled planned events and campaign rallies out of respect for the victims and their families. Bulgarian President Rosen Plevneliev blamed the disaster on "arrogant non-observance of the recommendations and the established norms for handling explosives".

In April 2021, Radio Free Europe alleged that Russian agents had been in Bulgaria around the time of the explosion.

== See also ==
- 2008 Chelopechene explosions, series of huge blasts that affected Bulgaria's capital Sofia
- 2014 Bulgarian floods, another disaster that struck the country a few months earlier
- Bomb disposal
- List of industrial disasters
