= Dolno Linevo =

Dolno Linevo Долно Линево
- Location of Dolno Linevo
- Coordinates: 43°50′34″N 23°19′32″E
- Country: Bulgaria
- Province (Oblast): Montana

Government
  - Mayor: Rosen Yosifov
- Elevation: 103 m (338 ft)

Population (2009-03-15)
  - Total: 281
- Time zone: UTC+2 (EET)
  - Summer (DST): UTC+3 (EEST)
- Postal Code: 3605
- Area code: 0971

Dolno Linevo (Bulgarian: Долно Линево) is a village in Northwestern Bulgaria. It is located in Lom Municipality, Montana Province. The village is situated on the right bank of the Danube River.

Linevo Cove in Smith Island, Antarctica is named after the village.

The village is known for its grape production and has attracted the attention of a number of overseas investors who are buying both vineyards and property in the village. Sofia based company Rubin Stanevo Ltd (РУБИН СТАНЕВО ЕООД) is one of the companies currently investing in the village, having purchased established vineyards in Dolno Linevo in 2013.

In 2014 the road from Lom to Dolno Linevo was resurfaced with the aim of making access easier to places of recreation, tourism, and winemaking in the Lom area. The village of Dolno Linevo is a favourite with fisherman as they are able to berth their boats on the bank of The Danube river here.

A 1945 report by an Allied Control Commission in Bulgaria stated that “On 10/8/1944 a British 2 engine plane exploded in the air in the village of Dolnolinevo in the district of Lom". The remains of the 5 British airmen on board were found buried on the spot.

The remains of a fort/tower dating back to the Roman Empire is located within the village and can be found at the co-ordinates 23.325769999999999, 43.843055999999997.

== See also ==
- List of villages in Montana Province
