= Staliyska mahala =

Staliyska mahala Сталийска махала
- Village
- Location of Staliyska mahala
- Coordinates: 43°44′25″N 23°10′06″E
- Country: Bulgaria
- Province (Oblast): Montana
- Municipality: Lom Municipality

Government
  - Mayor: Aleksandar Milanov
- Elevation: 46 m (151 ft)

Population (2009-03-15)
  - Total: 1,352
- Time zone: UTC+2 (EET)
  - Summer (DST): UTC+3 (EEST)
- Postal Code: 3657
- Area code: 097222

Staliyska mahala (Bulgarian: Сталийска махала) is a village in northwestern Bulgaria, with a population of around 1,300. It is located in the Lom Municipality of the Montana Province. It has a train stop on the Brusartsi - Lom railway.

The village includes a protected environmental area.

== See also ==
- List of villages in Montana Province
