= Bostanite =

- Village
- Location within Bulgaria
- Coordinates: 43°34′N 22°41′E
- Country: Bulgaria
- Province: Vidin Province
- Municipality: Chuprene
- Elevation: 333 m (1,093 ft)

Population (2018)
  - Total: 0
- Time zone: UTC+2 (EET)
  - Summer (DST): UTC+3 (EEST)

Bostanite is a former village in the municipality of Chuprene, in Vidin Province, in northwestern Bulgaria.

== Population ==
According to the 2011 census, the village of Bostanite has 0 inhabitants, down from 1 inhabitant during the 2001 census. The last inhabitant died in 2004.
