= Targovishte (village) =

Coordinates: 43.5319°N 22.7031°E

- Village
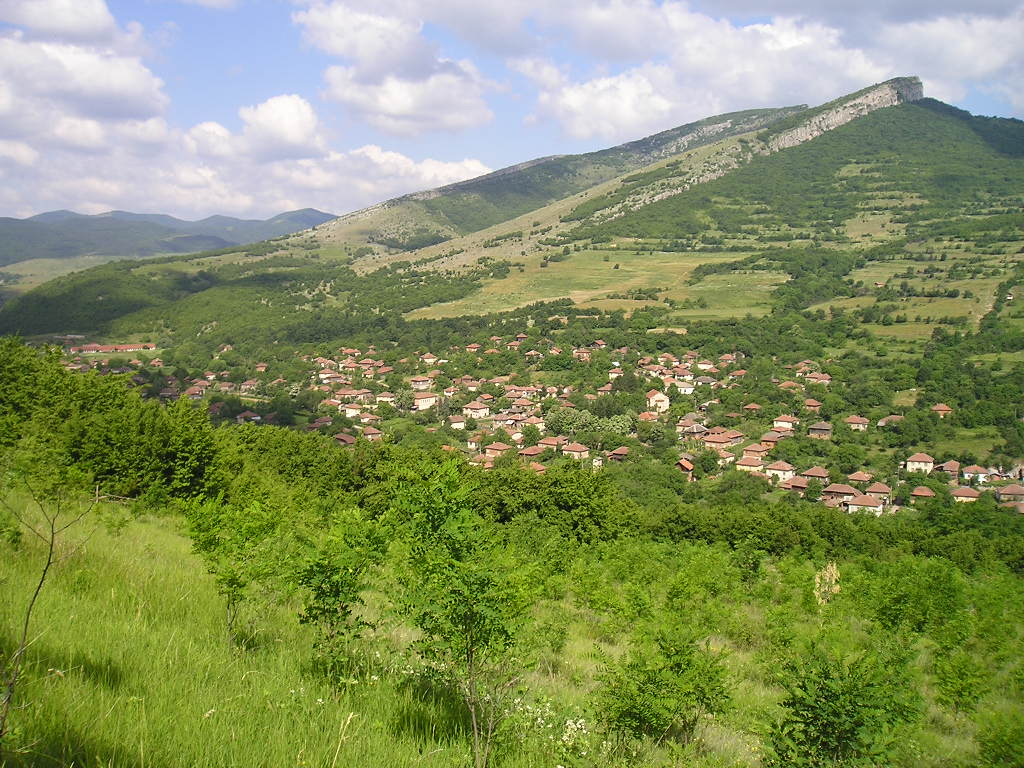
- Interactive map of Targovishte (village)
- Country: Bulgaria
- Province: Vidin Province
- Municipality: Chuprene
- Elevation: 350 m (1,150 ft)
- Time zone: UTC+2 (EET)
  - Summer (DST): UTC+3 (EEST)

Targovishte (village) is a village in the municipality of Chuprene, in Vidin Province, in northwestern Bulgaria.
