= Orsoya =

- Location of Orsoya
- Coordinates: 43°47′N 23°6′E
- Country: Bulgaria
- Provinces (Oblast): Montana
- Elevation: 120 m (390 ft)

Population (2005-09-13)
  - Total: 144
- Time zone: UTC+2 (EET)
  - Summer (DST): UTC+3 (EEST)
- Postal Code: 3665
- Area code: 09728

Orsoya (Bulgarian: Орсоя [orˈsɔjɐ]) is a village near the Danube River in Lom Municipality, Montana Province, northwestern Bulgaria, 14 km. west of Lom.

Orsoya Rocks in the South Shetland Islands off Antarctica are named after the village.

== History ==
A necropolis dating to the Late Bronze Age has been discovered in the vicinity of Orsoya. The remains of the ancient Roman fortified road station of Remetodia have been uncovered within the village's territory. Located 1.7 km south of the Danube River, the site covers an area of approximately 3 decares (0.3 hectares).

== See also ==
- List of villages in Montana Province
