= Chuprene =

Chuprene Чупрене
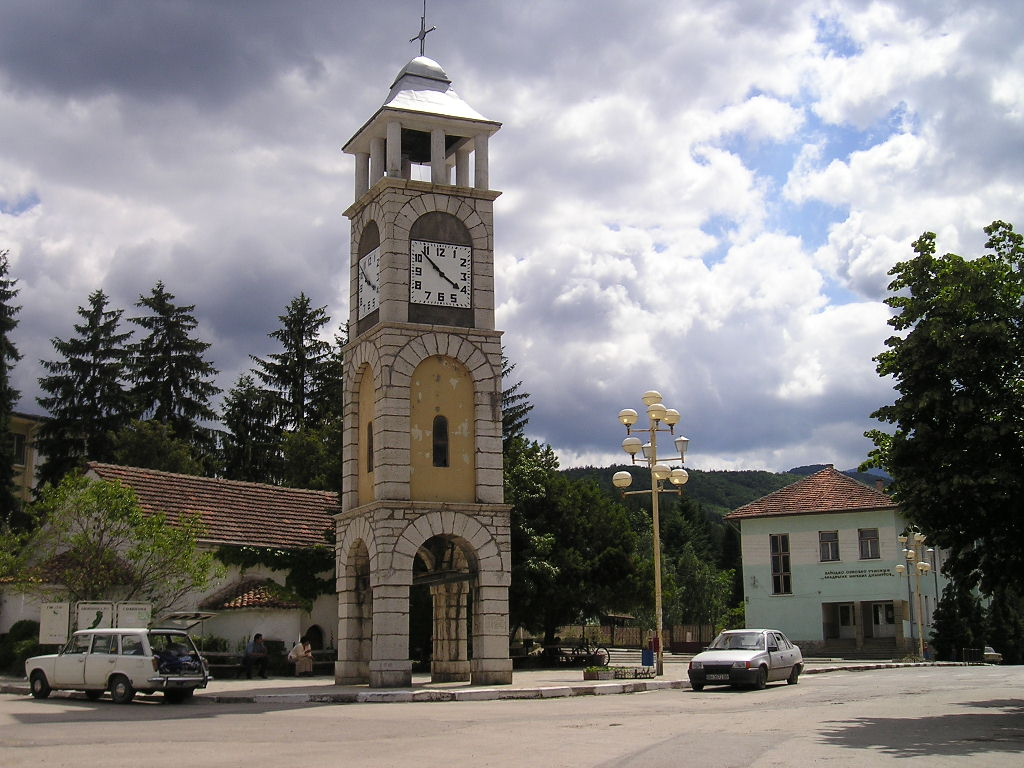
- The central square in Chuprene with the clock tower, the church and the school

- Location of Chuprene
- Coordinates: 43°31′04″N 22°39′54″E
- Country: Bulgaria
- Provinces (Oblast): Vidin

Government
  - Mayor: Vanyo Kostin
- Elevation: 556 m (1,824 ft)

Population (2008)
  - Total: 585
- Time zone: UTC+2 (EET)
  - Summer (DST): UTC+3 (EEST)
- Postal Code: 3950
- Area code: 09327

Chuprene (Bulgarian: Чупрене, pronounced [ˈt͡ʃuprɛnɛ]) is a village in northwestern Bulgaria, part of Vidin Province. It is the administrative centre of the homonymous Chuprene Municipality, which lies in the southern part of Vidin Province. The village is located 20 kilometres from Belogradchik, 70 kilometres from Vidin, and 13-15 kilometres from the Bulgarian-Serbian border.

Chuprene is situated on the Manastirka and Chuprene rivers in the western Balkan Mountains, at the foot of the Sveti Nikola Mountain and close to Midzhur, the highest peak of the western Balkan Mountains at 2,169 metres. The village is part of the copper ore vein from Bor to Chiprovtsi, and may have been settled by German ("Saxon") ore miners in the Middle Ages. The area has been inhabited since the Bronze Age and was part of the Roman Empire in Antiquity, the First Bulgarian Empire and the Second Bulgarian Empire in medieval times. The village itself was first mentioned in an Ottoman register of the Vidin sanjak of 1454–1455. Jérôme-Adolphe Blanqui mentions it as Chupren in the description of his journey from Belogradchik to Niš in 1841. After the Liberation of Bulgaria, Chuprene grew rapidly and reached a peak population of 1,800–2,000.

The entire population is Christian, Bulgarian Orthodoxy being the dominant confession. Chuprene has a church with a bell and clock tower. The Chuprene Biosphere Reserve is located in the surrounding mountains.

== Municipality ==
Chuprene municipality includes the following 9 places:

- Chuprene
- Dolni Lom
- Gorni Lom
- Protopopintsi
- Replyana
- Sredogriv
- Targovishte
- Varbovo

== Trivia ==
Chuprene Glacier on Smith Island, among South Shetland Islands of the British Antarctic Territory, is named after Chuprene.

== Gallery ==
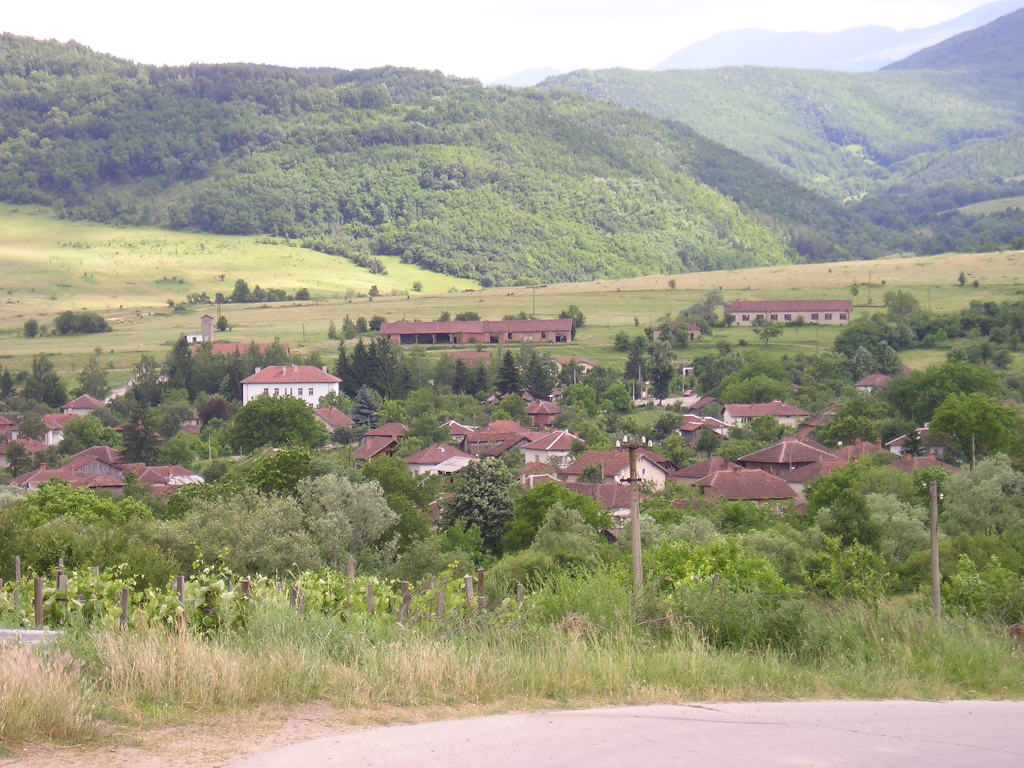
Overview of Chuprene

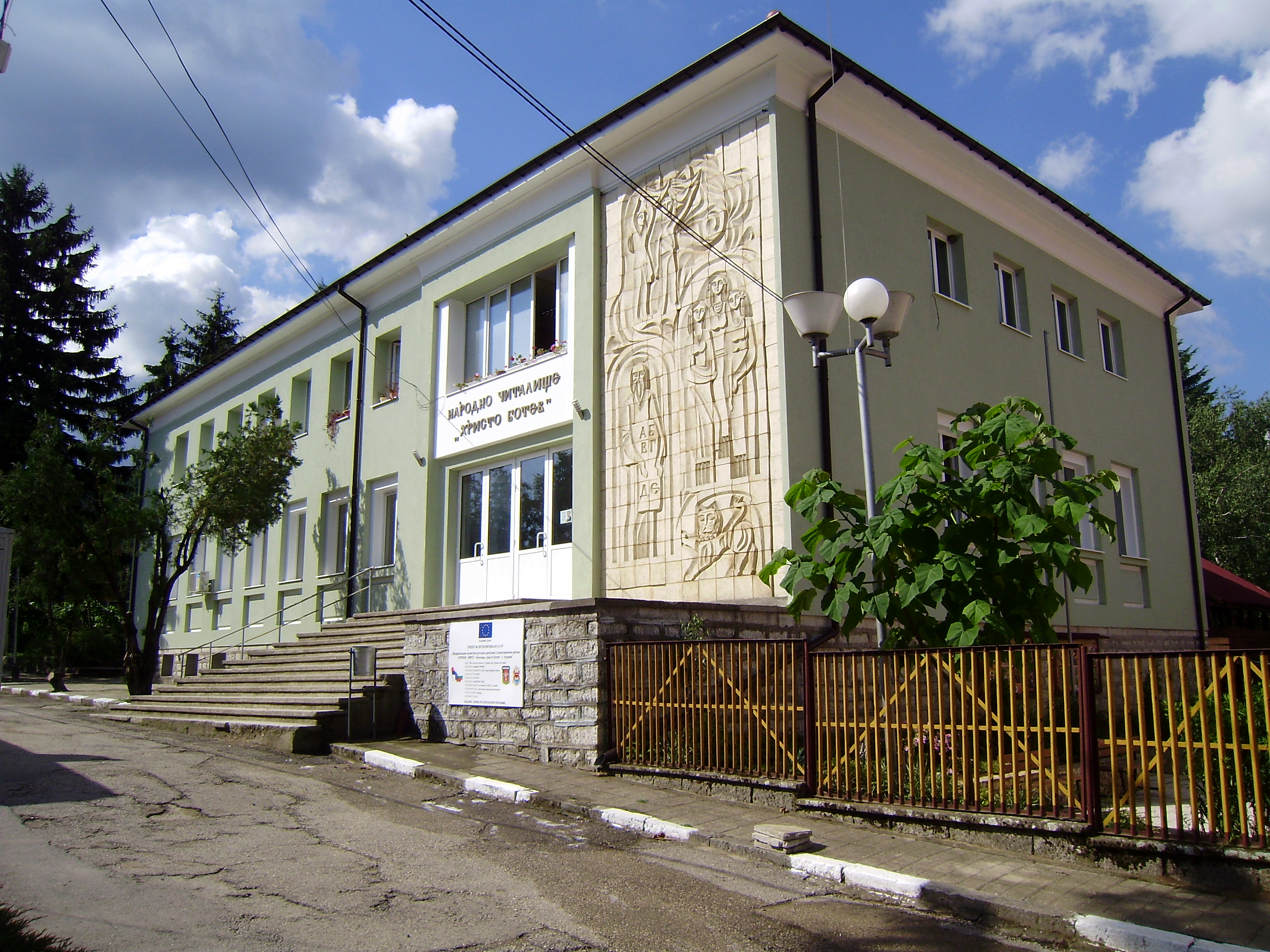
Chitalishte "Hristo Botev" in Chuprene

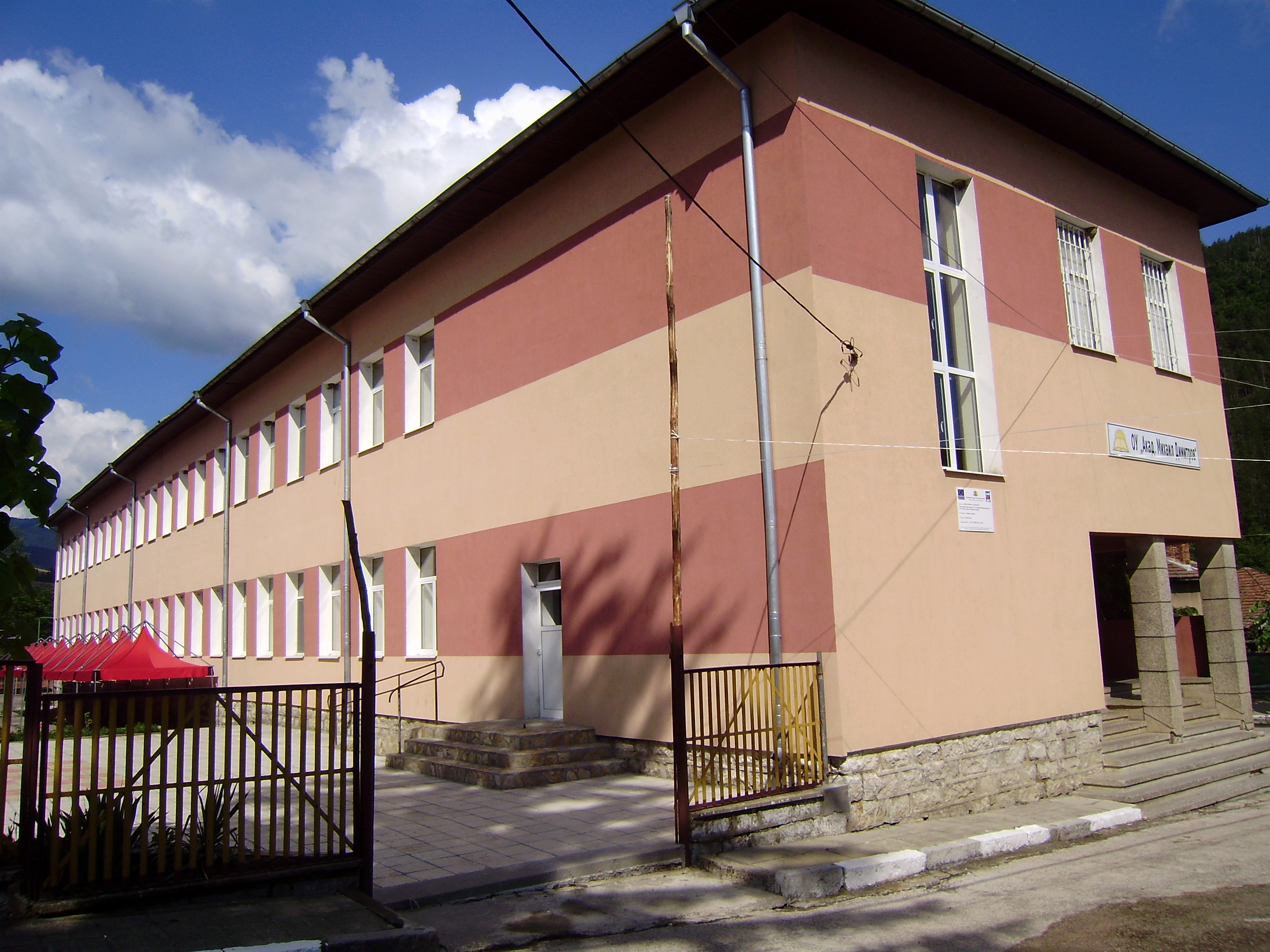
School of Chuprene

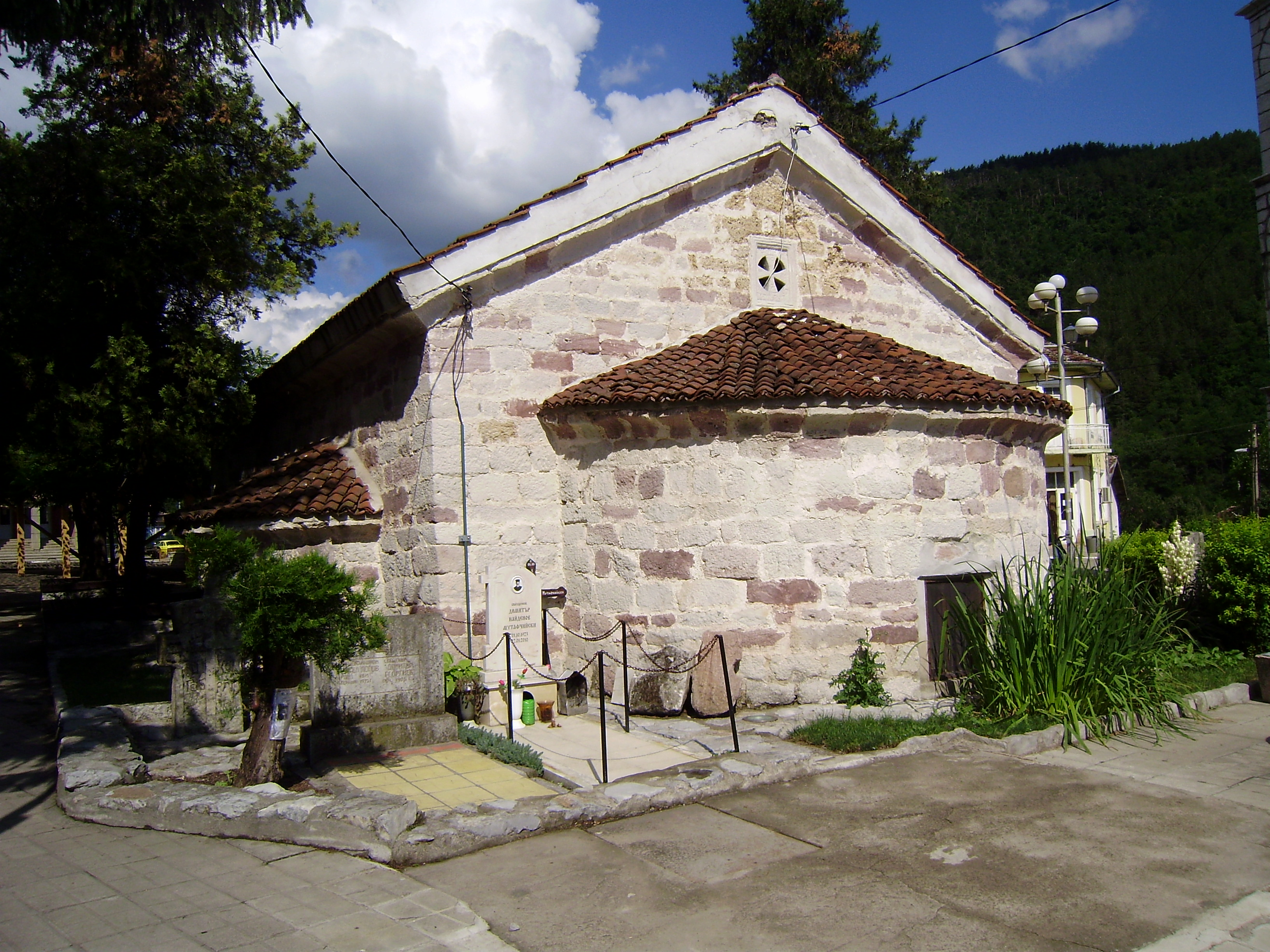
Church of Chuprene

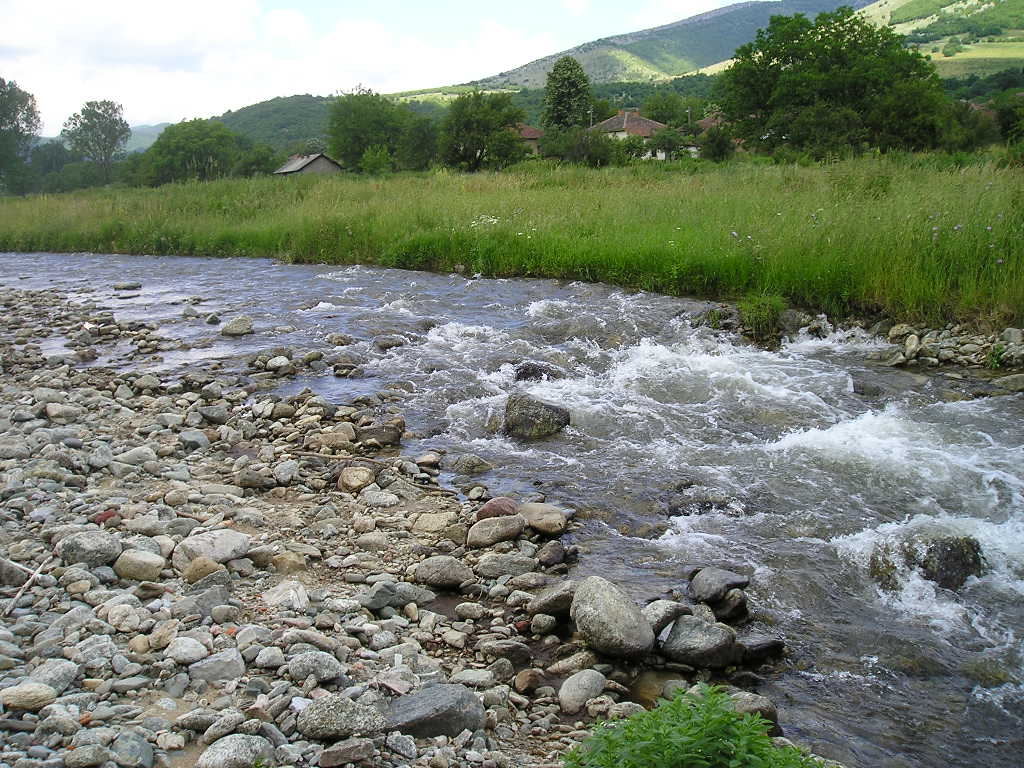
The Chuprene River

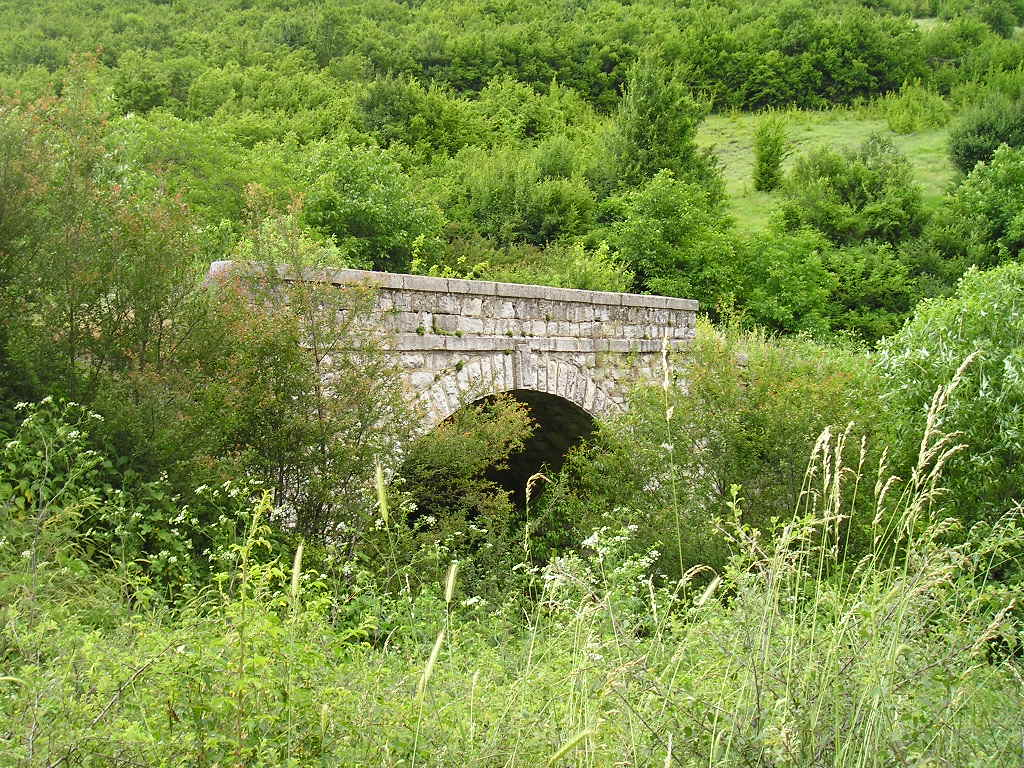
Stone bridge near Varbovo

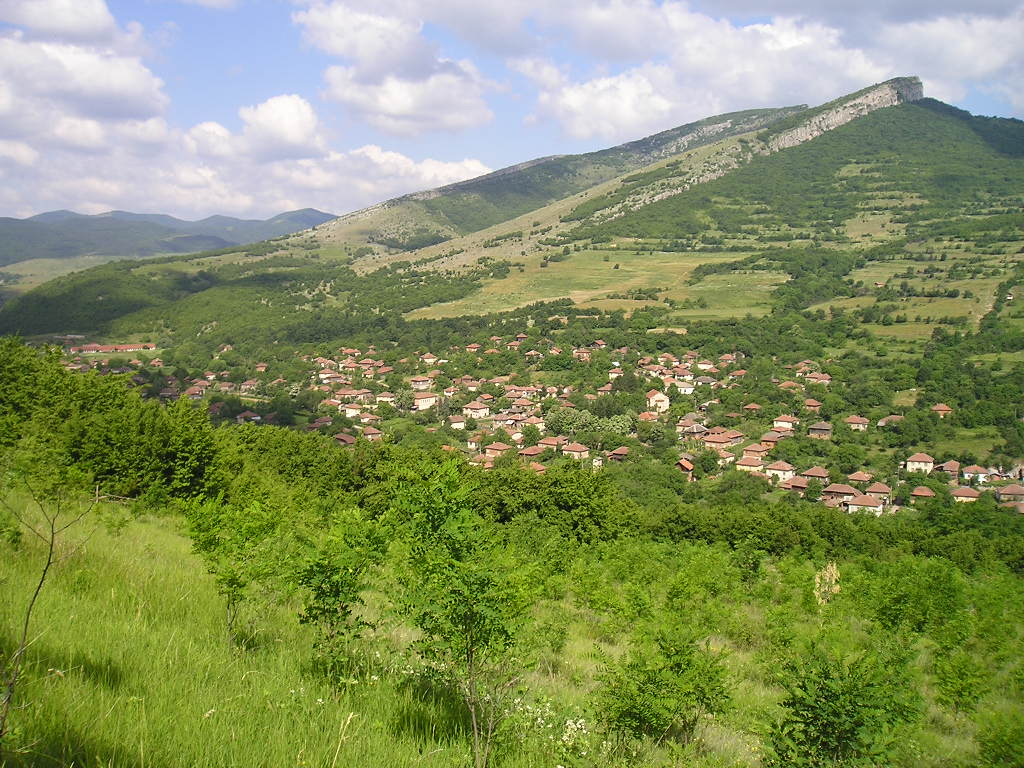
Overview of Targovishte
