= Slivata =

Slivata Сливата
- Location of Slivata
- Coordinates: 43°45′52″N 23°02′14″E
- Country: Bulgaria
- Province (Oblast): Montana

Government
  - Mayor: Angel Dimitrov
- Elevation: 122 m (400 ft)

Population (2009-03-15)
  - Total: 239
- Time zone: UTC+2 (EET)
  - Summer (DST): UTC+3 (EEST)
- Postal Code: 3668
- Area code: 09728

Slivata (Bulgarian: Сливата) is a village in Northwestern Bulgaria. It is located in Lom Municipality, Montana Province.
