= Gorni Lom =

Gorni Lom Горни Лом
- Village
- Location in Bulgaria
- Coordinates: 43.4826°N 22.7421°E
- Country: Bulgaria
- Province: Vidin Province
- Municipality: Chuprene Municipality
- Elevation: 430 m (1,410 ft)

Population (2016)
  - Total: 700
- Time zone: UTC+2 (EET)
  - Summer (DST): UTC+3 (EEST)

Gorni Lom (Bulgarian: Горни Лом) is a village in north-western Bulgaria, Vidin Province. The population of Gorni Lom is 784.

The village is situated in a mountainous region, on the upper stream of the Lom River. It is located in the foot of Midzhur, the highest peak in western Stara Planina. Gorni Lom is a starting point for the tourists who climb Midzhur. Most of the village inhabitants work in a factory producing explosives or in the five small hydropower plants on the river.

== Economy ==
A significant part of the population is employed at the nearby Videx Ammo Plant (Former Midzhur Ammo Plant).

== 2014 explosions ==
On 1 October 2014, in the former Midzhur Ammo Plant owned by Videx AD, a blast killed 15 workers and completely demolished the factory. The explosion happened at 16:59 local time, killing 15 men and two women and injuring three other women. According to authorities, an unspecified "human error" caused the explosion.

Following the incident, 3 October 2014 was declared a Day of National Mourning.

- For more detailed information, see 2014 Gorni Lom explosions

== See also ==
- List of villages in Vidin Province
