= Brusartsi Municipality =

Brusartsi Municipality Община Брусарци
- Municipality
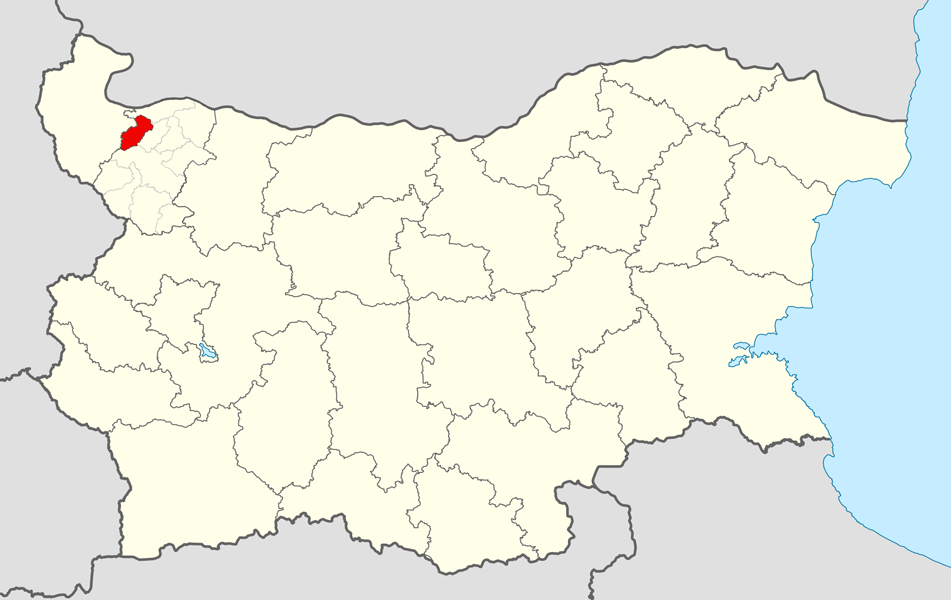
- Brusartsi Municipality within Bulgaria and Montana Province.
- Coordinates: 43°39′N 23°2′E
- Country: Bulgaria
- Province (Oblast): Montana
- Admin. centre (Obshtinski tsentar): Brusartsi

Area
  - Total: 194.55 km^{2} (75.12 sq mi)

Population (Census February 2011)
  - Total: 4,954
  - Density: 25.46/km^{2} (65.95/sq mi)
- Time zone: UTC+2 (EET)
  - Summer (DST): UTC+3 (EEST)

Brusartsi Municipality (Bulgarian: Община Брусарци) is a small municipality (obshtina) in Montana Province, Northwestern Bulgaria, located in the Danubian Plain about 6 km south of Danube river. It is named after its administrative centre - the town of Brusartsi.

The municipality embraces a territory of 194.55 km^{2} with a population of 4,954 inhabitants, as of February 2011.

The area contains the Smirnenski Reservoir.

== Settlements ==
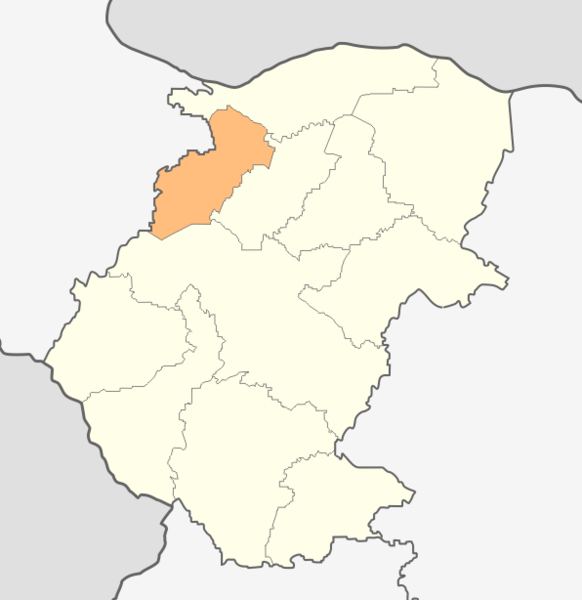
Brusartsi Municipality within Montana Province

Brusartsi Municipality includes the following 10 places (towns are shown in bold):

Town/Village	Cyrillic	Population (December 2009)
**Brusartsi**	**Брусарци**	1,302
Bukovets	Буковец	199
Dondukovo	Дондуково	416
Dabova Mahala	Дъбова Махала	112
Kiselevo	Киселево	242
Knyazheva Mahala	Княжева Махала	133
Kriva Bara	Крива бара	1,132
Odorovtsi	Одоровци	33
Smirnenski	Смирненски	563
Vasilovtsi	Василовци	1,337
Total		5,469

== Demography ==
The following table shows the change of the population during the last four decades.

Brusartsi Municipality
**Year**	1975	1985	1992	**2001**	2005	2007	2009	**2011**
**Population**	10,818	9,056	8,073	6,826	6,090	5,769	5,469	4,954
Sources: Census 2001, Census 2011, „pop-stat.mashke.org“,

=== Religion ===
According to the latest Bulgarian census of 2011, the religious composition, among those who answered the optional question on religious identification, was the following:

Religious composition of Brusartsi Municipality
Orthodox Christianity	65.5%
Catholicism	0.3%
Protestantism	0.5%
Islam	0.1%
No religion	26.5%
Prefer not to answer, others and indefinable	6.1%

== See also ==
- Provinces of Bulgaria
- Municipalities of Bulgaria
- List of cities and towns in Bulgaria
