= Midžor =

Mountain peak on the border between Bulgaria and Serbia

Midzhur/Midžor
- Midzhur Миджур (in Bulgarian) • Midžor Миџор (in Serbian) •
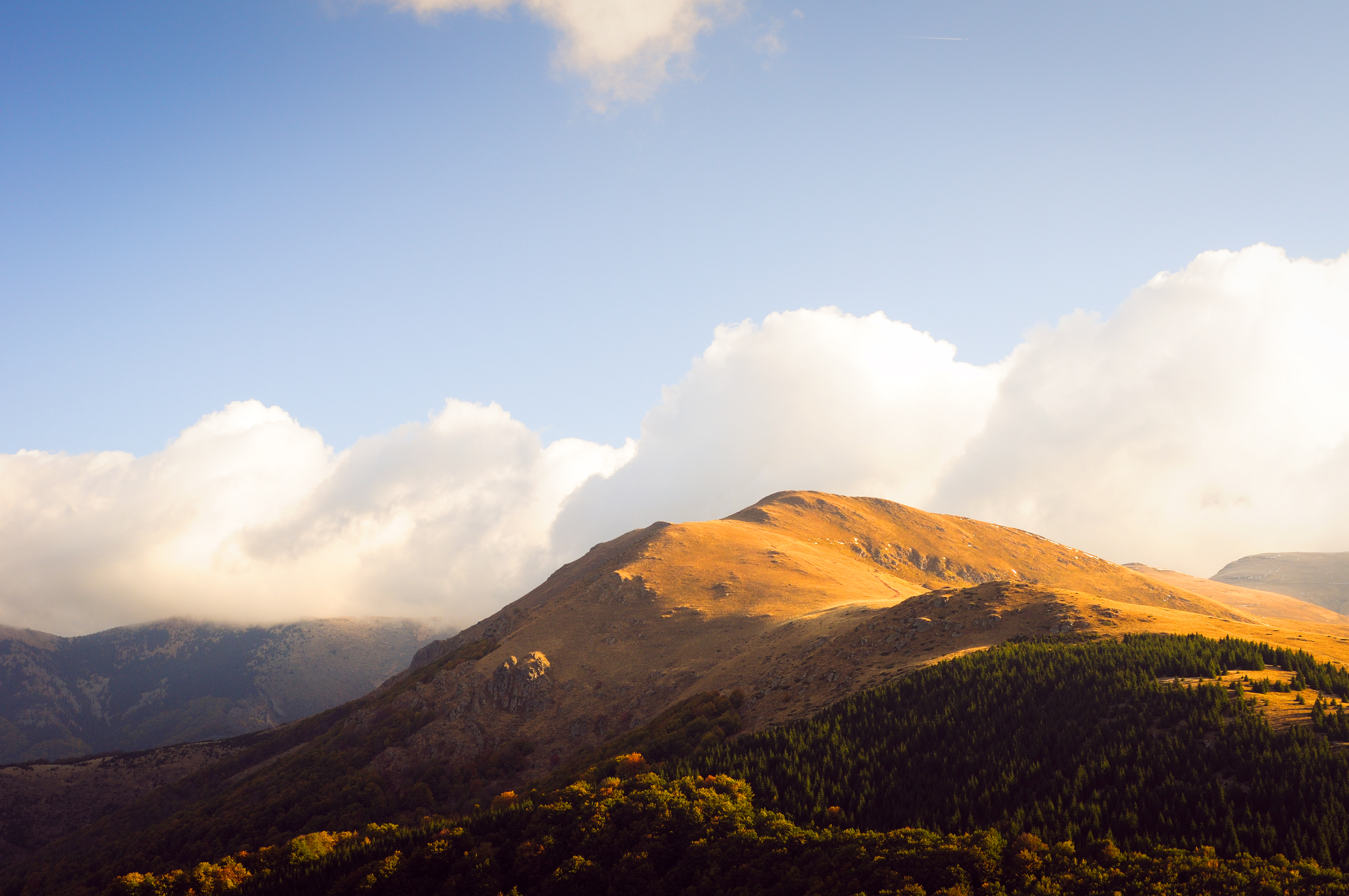

Highest point
- Elevation: 2,169 m (7,116 ft)
- Prominence: 1,478 m (4,849 ft)
- Listing: Ribu
- Coordinates: 43°23′38″N 22°40′54″E

Naming
- Language of name: Bulgarian, Serbian

Geography
- Location within Bulgaria Location within Serbia
- Location: Bulgaria, Serbia
- Parent range: Balkan Mountains

Midžor (Serbian Cyrillic: Миџор, pronounced [mîdʒɔr]) or Midzhur (Bulgarian: Миджур, pronounced [miˈd͡ʒur]) is a peak in the Balkan Mountains, situated on the border between Bulgaria and Serbia. At 2,169 metres (7,116 ft), it is the highest peak of the Western Balkan Mountains, as well as the highest in Serbia. (Note: Including Kosovo, the highest peak of Serbia is Velika Rudoka of the Šar mountains range at 2,660 metres (8,727 ft))

== Bulgaria ==
In Bulgaria, the peak is known as Midzhur.

Since the early 1990s, it has been accessible to tourists from both sides of the border; previously, access was forbidden due to the peak being in the border area. Due to those restrictions, the nature around the peak has been preserved untouched. On the Bulgarian side, the peak is reachable from the villages of Chuprene and Gorni Lom in Vidin Province.

=== Chuprene ===
From Chuprene there are two possibilities for climbing. There is a 17 km dirt road following the river Chuprenska to the Gorski Ray refuge (1,450 m) or a 9 km foot track following the river Manastirska.

From the refuge there is a marked track which passes through the Chuprene Biosphere Reserve and leads to the main summit on a saddle between the peaks Replyanska Tsarkva (1,969 m) and Ostra Chuka (1967 m). To the south east through the peaks Ostra Chuka and Oba (2,033 m) the track reaches a saddle from where the Lom River and the Timok flow out at border stone 336. From there, the peak can be climbed from the north-western slope.

=== Gorni Lom ===
At 7 km from the village of Gorni Lom is located the Gorni Lom refuge (840 m). There is also another refuge upstream called Mudzhur. There are steep tracks from there leading to the saddle between Oba and the peak at border stone 336 from where both tracks from the two villages merge.

=== Economy ===
The source of the Lom River is at the foot of the peak. A cascade of small hydroelectric power plants is in operation on the river near the peak and four more are under construction. Chuprene biosphere reserve, which is under the protection of UNESCO, is situated to the west of the peak. It is one of the last sanctuaries in Bulgaria where the Capercaillie nests.

== Serbia ==
In Serbia the peak is known as Midžor.

The extreme peak of the western mountain is north of the village of Topli Dol, located in the centre of Serbian Stara Planina, between Tri Čuke (1936 m) on the SE side and Babin Zub (1758 m) on the SW side. The massif of the Midžor peak is substantial. Its western, eastern, and southern slopes are grassy and not so steep, while its northern side is rocky and very steep. This side is also the most attractive and very popular among rock climbers.

There is a hotel called "Babin Zub" on the slopes. There are no fees or permits needed to enter the Serbian Stara Planina.

== Gallery ==
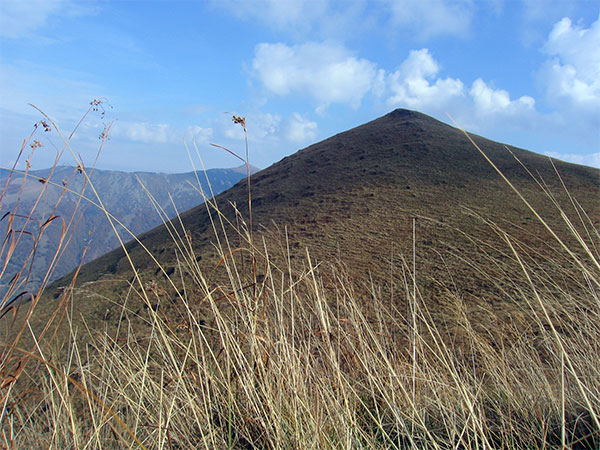
Peak

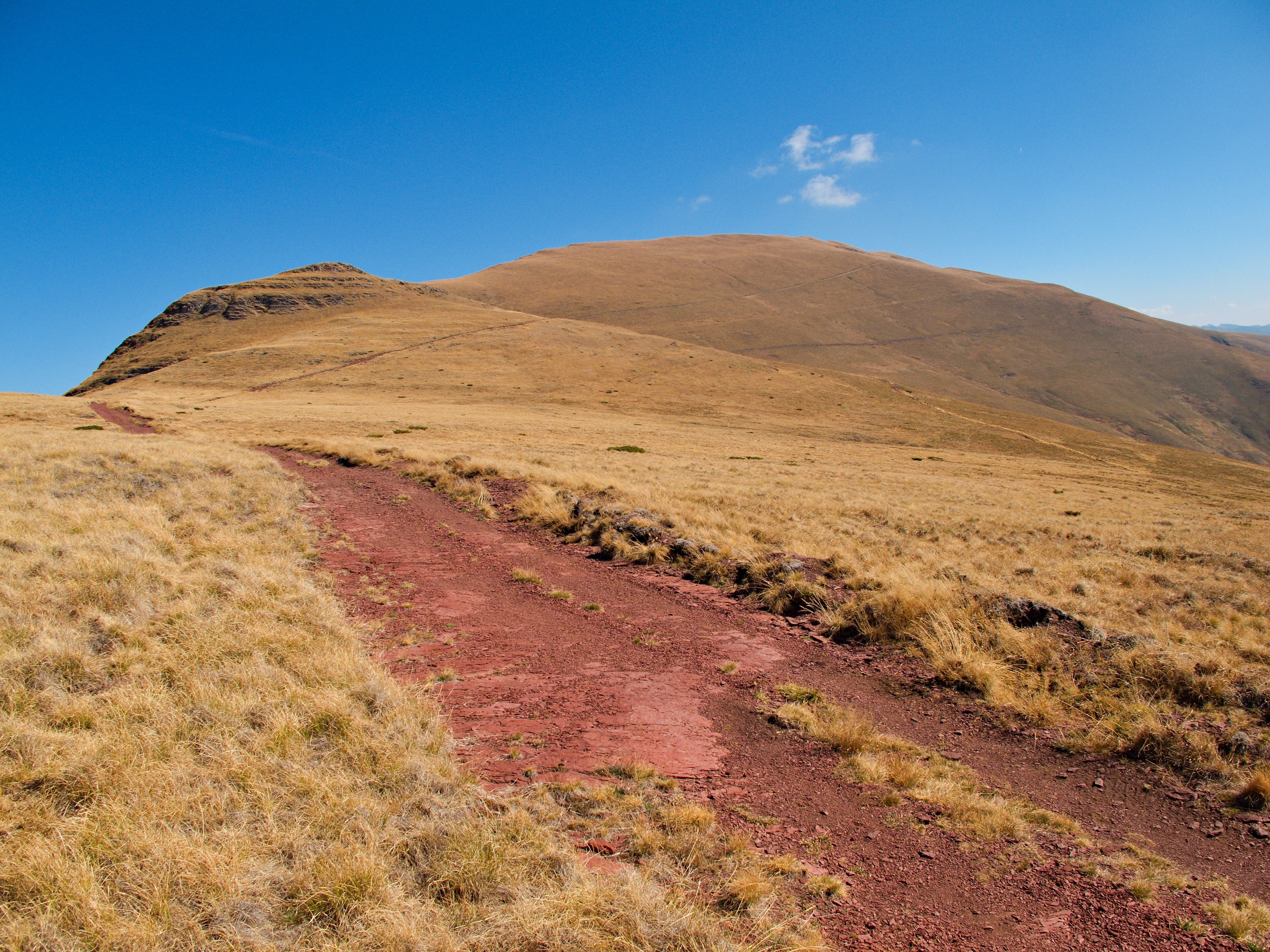
Trail to the summit

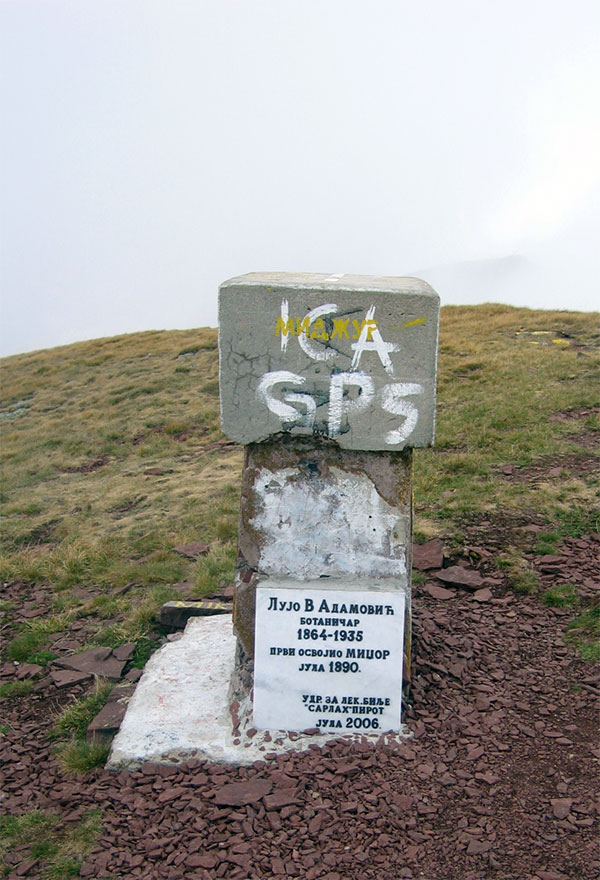
Border stone

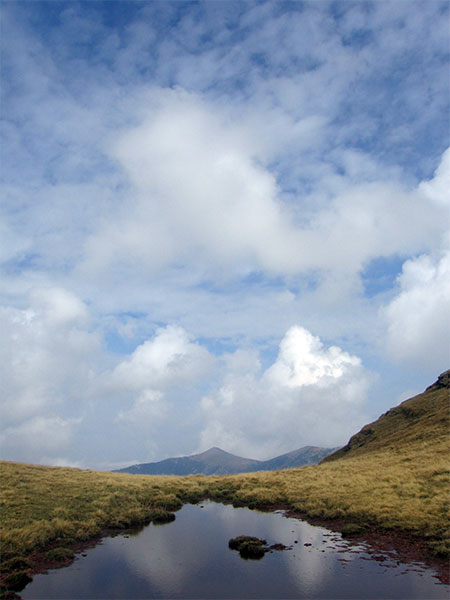
Sky and water

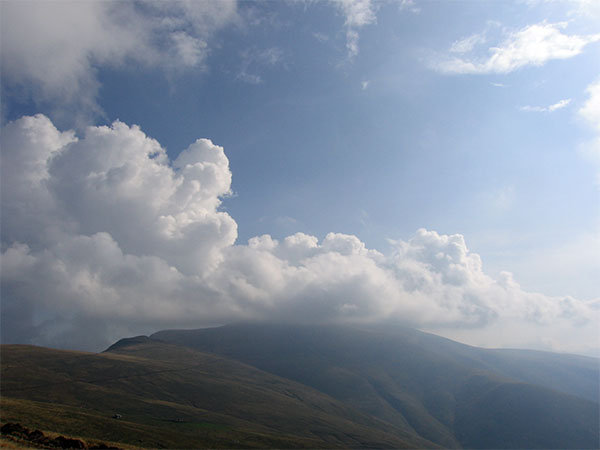
Clouds

== See also ==
- Midzhur Peak in Antarctica, named after Midzhur mountain

== Footnotes ==
Notes
