= Vasilovtsi, Montana Province =

Village in Montana Province, Bulgaria

Vasilovtsi Василовци
- Village
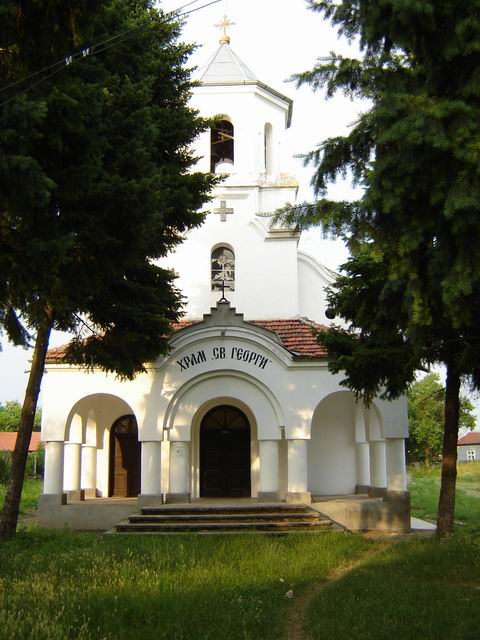
- Saint George's church, Vasilovtsi

- Location in Bulgaria
- Coordinates: 43°43′N 23°08′E
- Country: Bulgaria
- Province: Montana
- Municipality: Brusartsi

Vasilovtsi (Bulgarian: Василовци, also transliterated Vasilovci or Wassilowzi) is a village in northwestern Bulgaria, located in the Brusartsi Municipality of the Montana Province. It is situated on the bank of the Lom River.
