= Ruzhintsi Municipality =

Ruzhintsi Municipality Община Ружинци
- Municipality
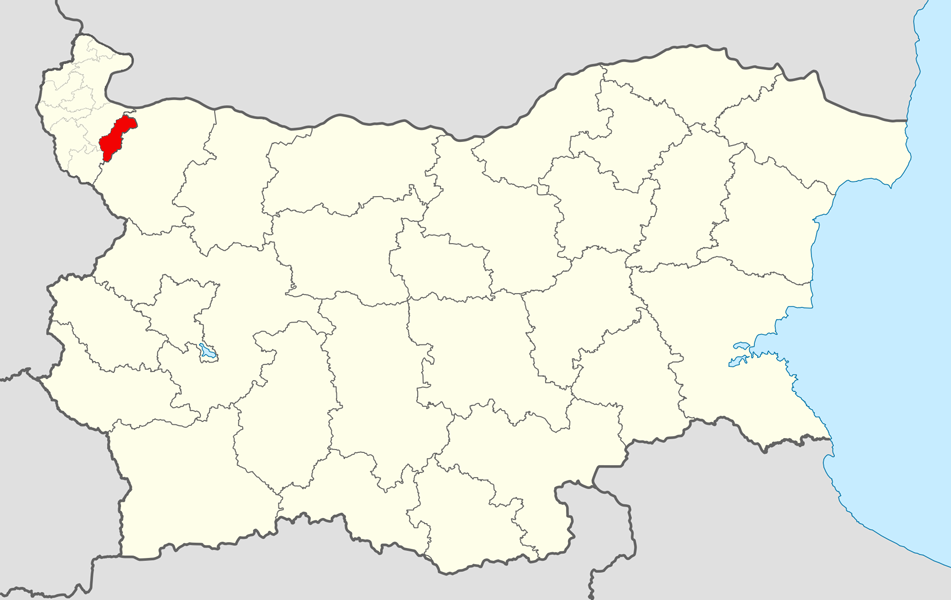
- Ruzhintsi Municipality within Bulgaria and Vidin Province.
- Coordinates: 43°36′N 22°52′E
- Country: Bulgaria
- Province (Oblast): Vidin
- Admin. centre (Obshtinski tsentar): Ruzhintsi

Area
  - Total: 232 km^{2} (90 sq mi)

Population (December 2009)
  - Total: 4,890
  - Density: 21.1/km^{2} (54.6/sq mi)
- Time zone: UTC+2 (EET)
  - Summer (DST): UTC+3 (EEST)

Ruzhintsi Municipality (Bulgarian: Община Ружинци) is a municipality (obshtina) in Vidin Province, Northwestern Bulgaria, located in the Danubian Plain about 8 km south of Danube river. It is named after its administrative centre - the village of Ruzhintsi.

The municipality embraces a territory of 232 km^{2} (90 sq mi) with a population of 4,890 inhabitants, as of December 2009.

The main road E79 crosses the southern parts of the area, connecting the province centre of Vidin with the city of Montana and respectively with the western operating part of the Hemus motorway.

== Settlements ==
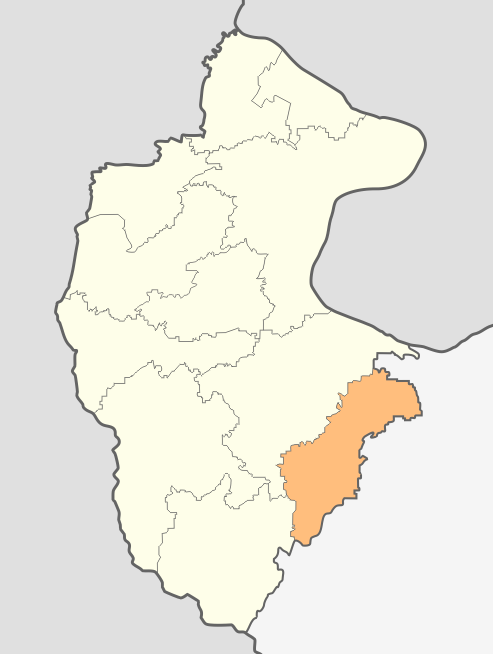
Ruzhintsi Municipality within Vidin Province

Ruzhintsi Municipality includes the following 10 places all of them villages:

Town/Village	Cyrillic	Population (December 2009)
Ruzhintsi	Ружинци	915
Belo Pole	Бело поле	929
Cherno Pole	Черно поле	283
Dinkovo	Динково	158
Drazhintsi	Дражинци	219
Drenovets	Дреновец	1,517
Gyurgich	Гюргич	278
Pleshivets	Плешивец	247
Roglets	Роглец	27
Topolovets	Тополовец	317
Total		4,890

== Demography ==
The following table shows the change of the population during the last four decades.

Ruzhintsi Municipality
Year	1975	1985	1992	2001	2005	2007	2009	2011
Population	9,722	7,740	7,101	6,061	5,423	5,166	4,890	4,374
Sources: Census 2001, Census 2011, „pop-stat.mashke.org“,

=== Religion ===
According to the latest Bulgarian census of 2011, the religious composition, among those who answered the optional question on religious identification, was the following:

Religious composition of Ruzhintsi Municipality
Orthodox Christianity	82.8%
Catholicism	0.4%
Protestantism	0.6%
Islam	0.1%
No religion	9.5%
Prefer not to answer, others and indefinable	6.6%

An overwhelming majority of the population of Ruzhintsi Municipality identify themselves as Christians. At the 2011 census, 82.8% of respondents identified as Orthodox Christians belonging to the Bulgarian Orthodox Church.

== See also ==
- Provinces of Bulgaria
- Municipalities of Bulgaria
- List of cities and towns in Bulgaria
