= Vasilovtsi, Sofia Province =

Coordinates: 42°56′N 23°04′E

Vasilovtsi (Bulgarian: Василовци, also transliterated Vasilovci, Vasilevtsi or Wassilowzi) is a village in western Bulgaria, located in the Dragoman Municipality of the Sofia Province.
