= Kriva bara, Montana Province =

Kriva bara Крива бара
- Village
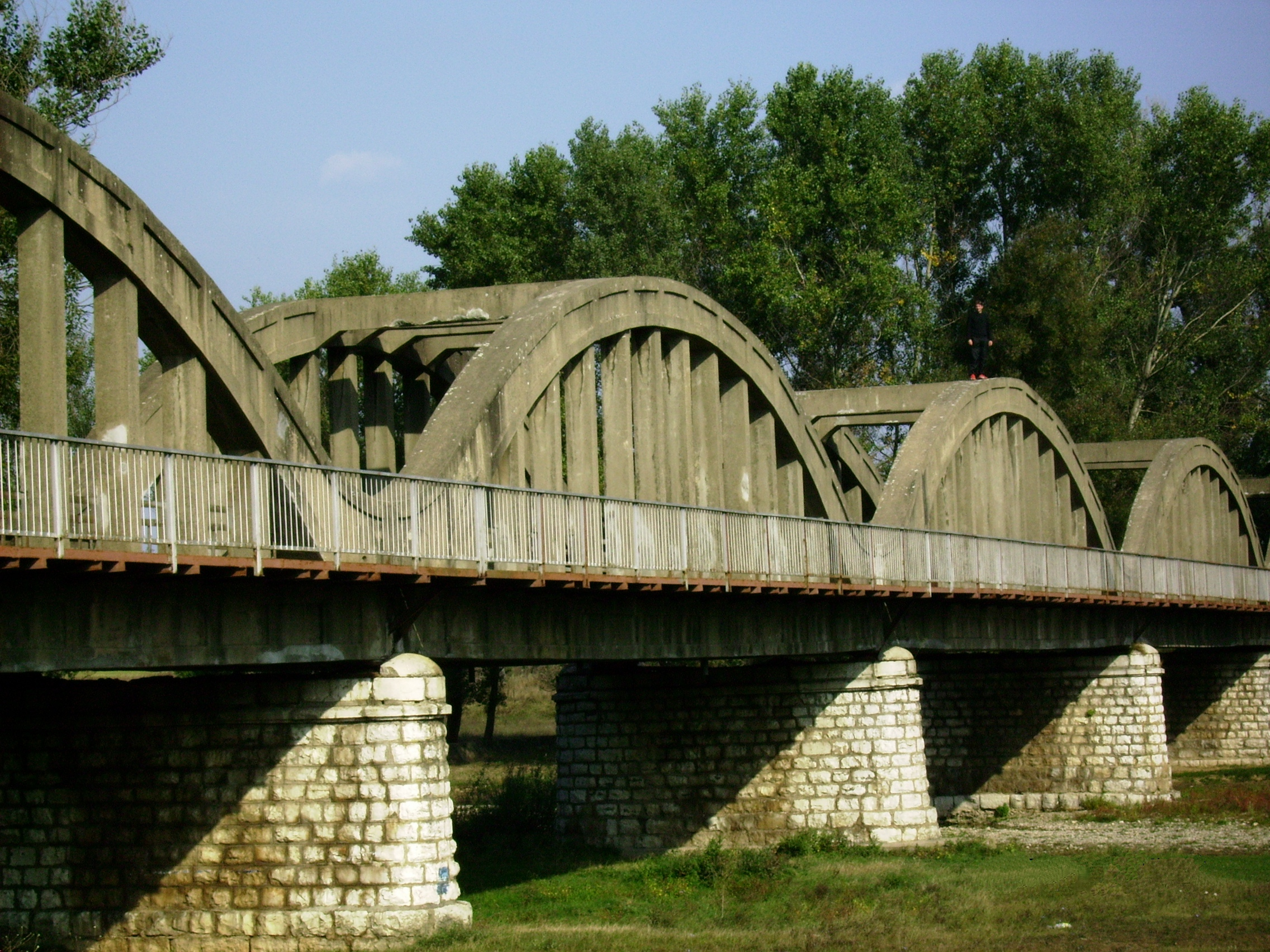
- The Italian-built bridge over the Lom at Kriva bara

- Location in Bulgaria
- Coordinates: 43°41′0″N 23°05′0″E
- Country: Bulgaria
- Province: Montana
- Municipality: Brusartsi

Government
  - Mayor: Peter Spasov (GERB)

Area
  - Total: 26,818 km^{2} (10,354 sq mi)
- Elevation: 68 m (223 ft)

Population (2015)
  - Total: 1,079
- Postal code: 3669
- Area code: 09783
- Vehicle registration: М

Kriva bara (Bulgarian: Крива бара) is a village in northwestern Bulgaria. It is located in the Brusartsi Municipality of the Montana Province.

A village of the same name also exists in the Kozloduy municipality of the Vratsa Province in Bulgaria.
