= Bukovets, Montana Province =

Bukovets Буковец
- Village
- Location within Bulgaria
- Coordinates: 43°35′52″N 022°58′15″E
- Country: Bulgaria
- Oblast: Montana
- Opština: Brusartsi

Government
  - Mayor: Natasha Mladenova (GERB)

Area
  - Total: 26.732 km^{2} (10.321 sq mi)
- Elevation: 197 m (646 ft)

Population (2024)
  - Total: 124
  - Density: 4.64/km^{2} (12.0/sq mi)
- Postal code: 3678
- Area code: 09782
- Vehicle registration: M

Bukovets (Bulgarian: Буковец) is a village (село) in northwestern Bulgaria, located in the Brusartsi Municipality (община Брусарци) of the Montana Province (Област Монтана).

== Gallery ==
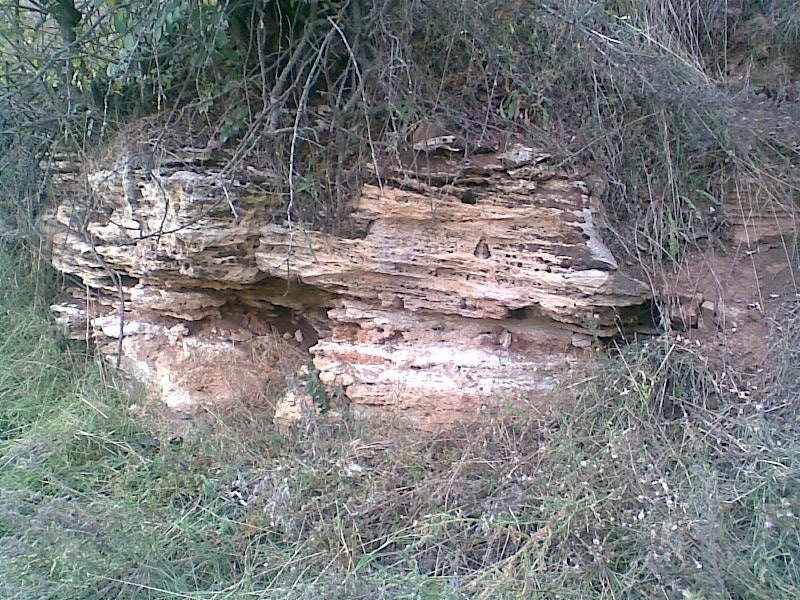

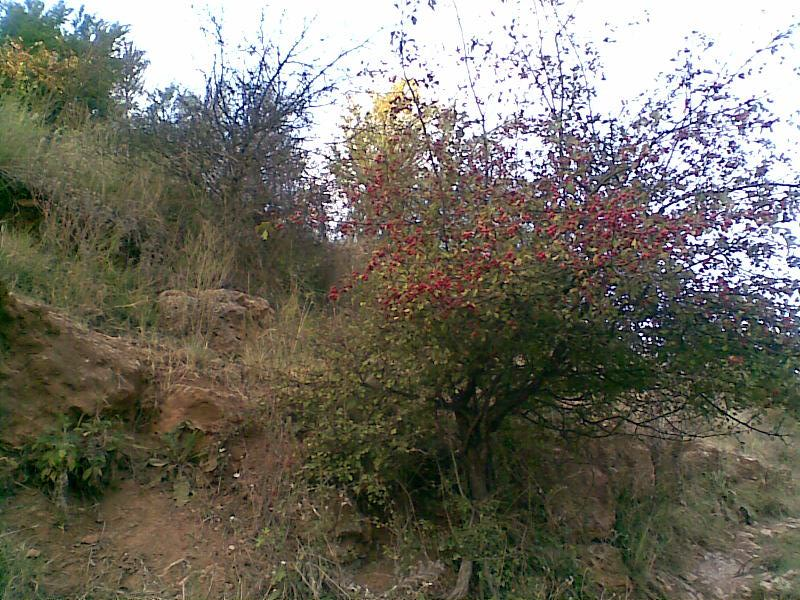

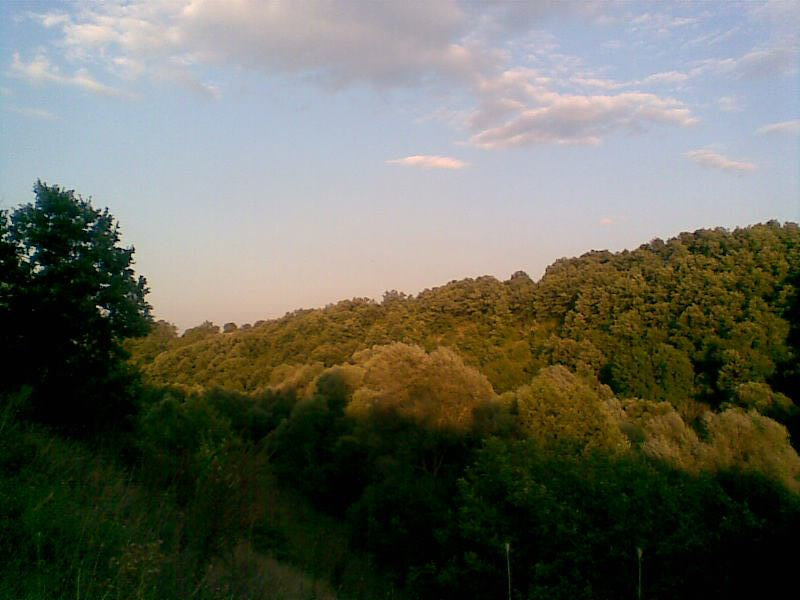

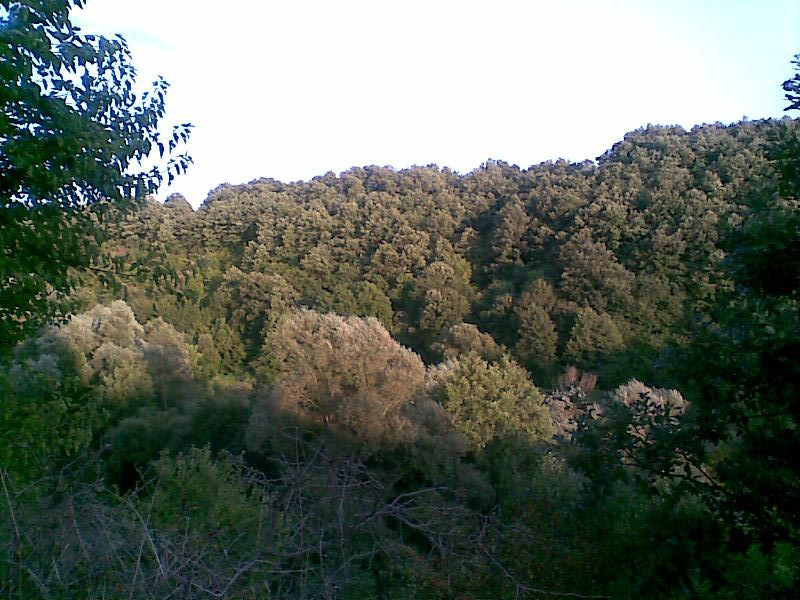

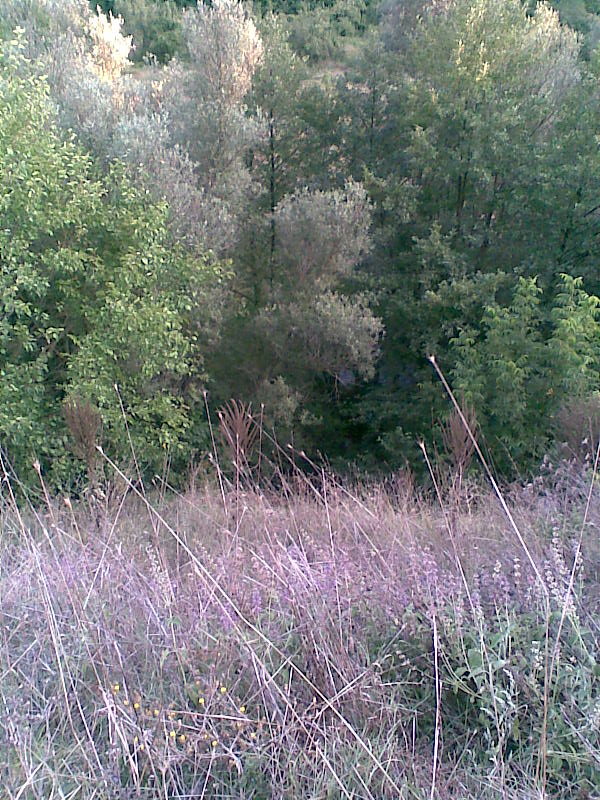

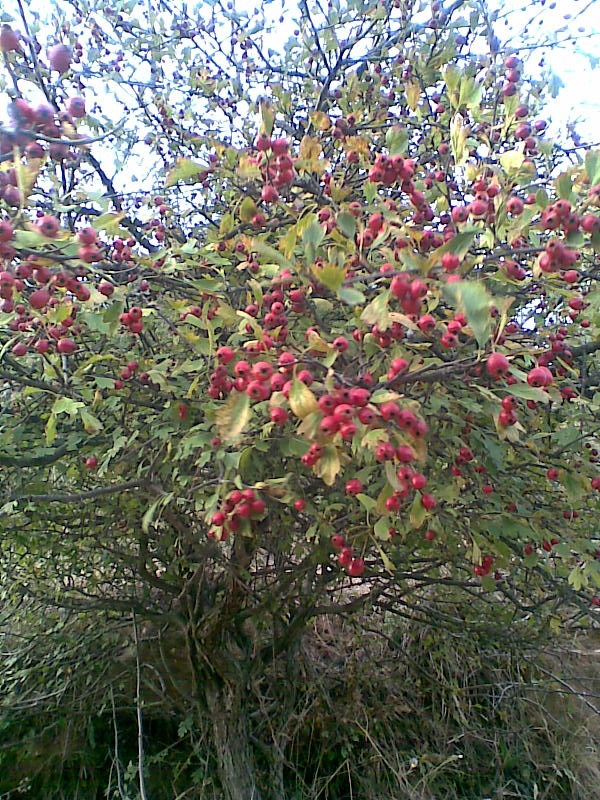

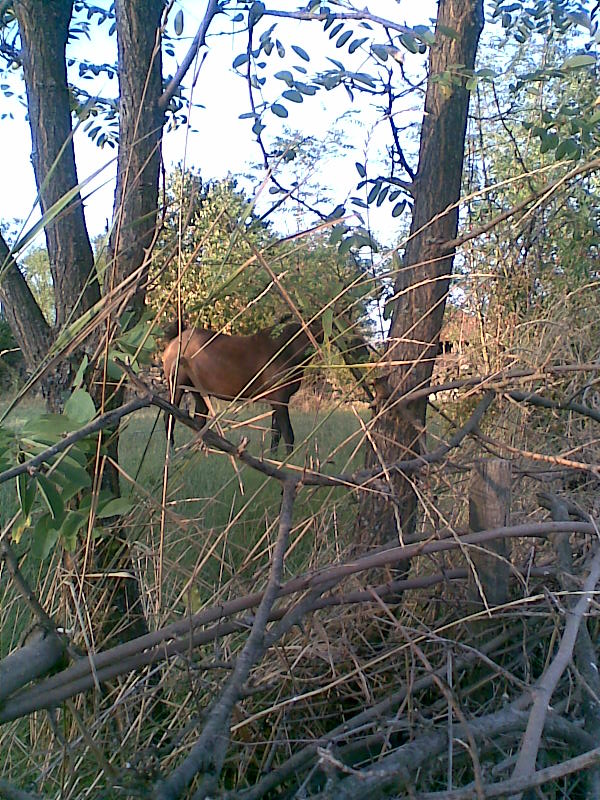

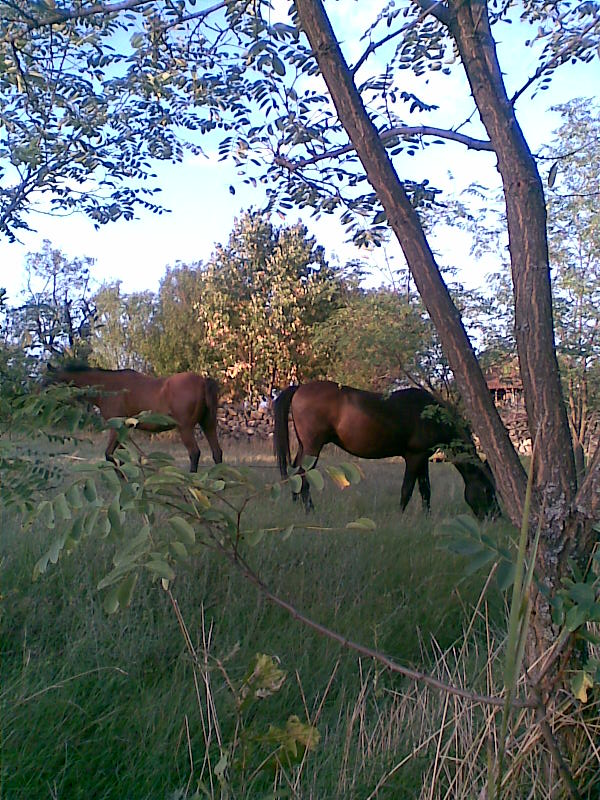

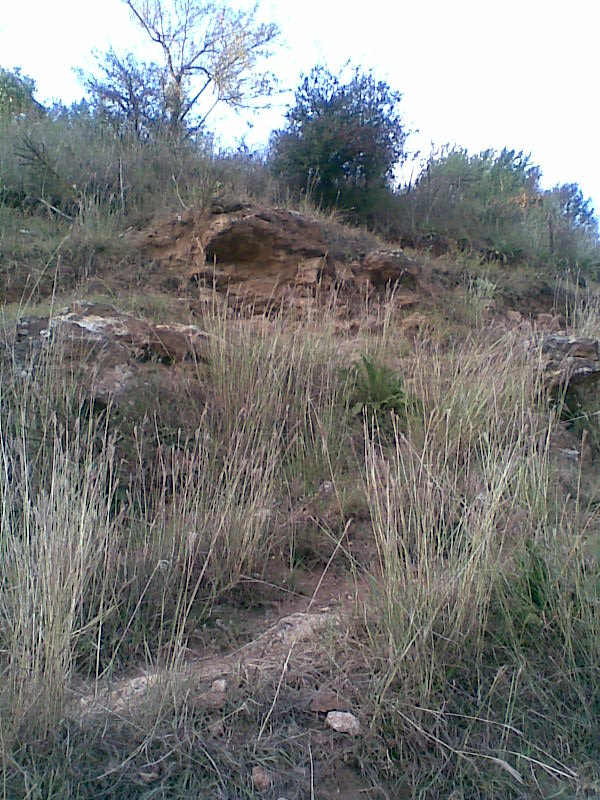

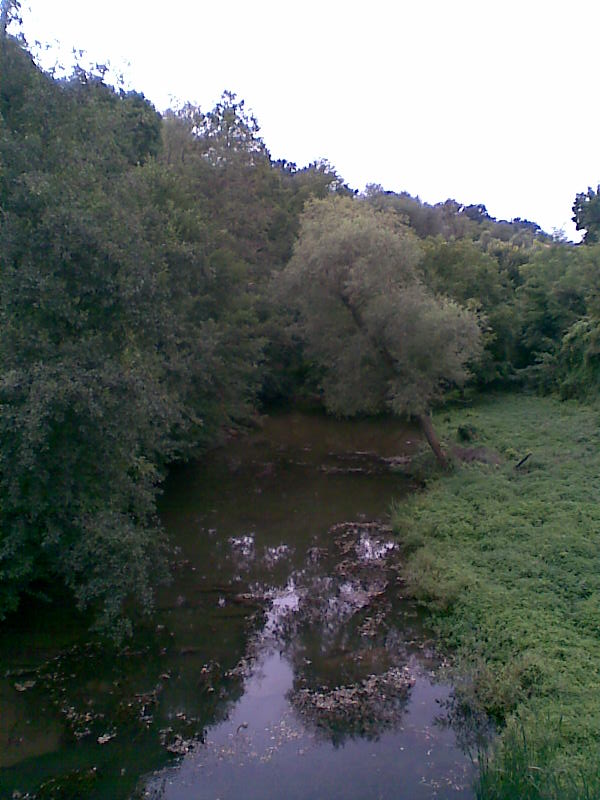

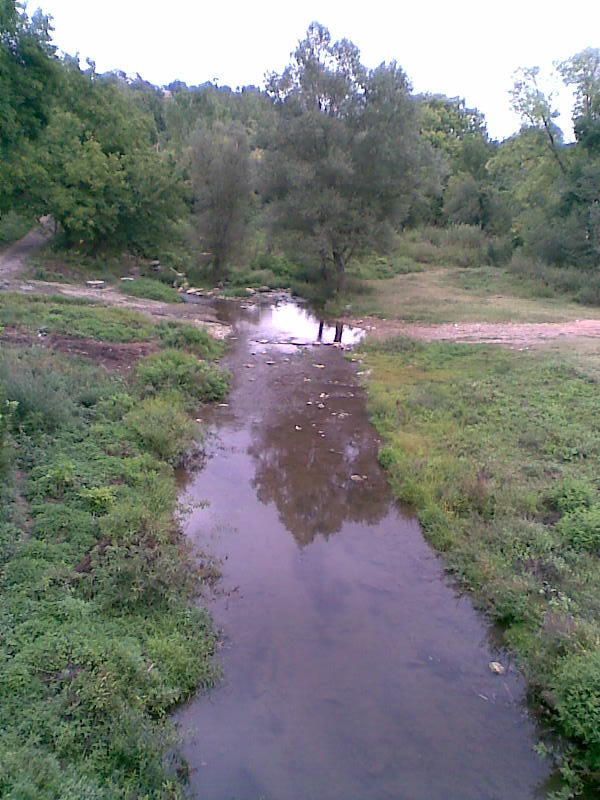

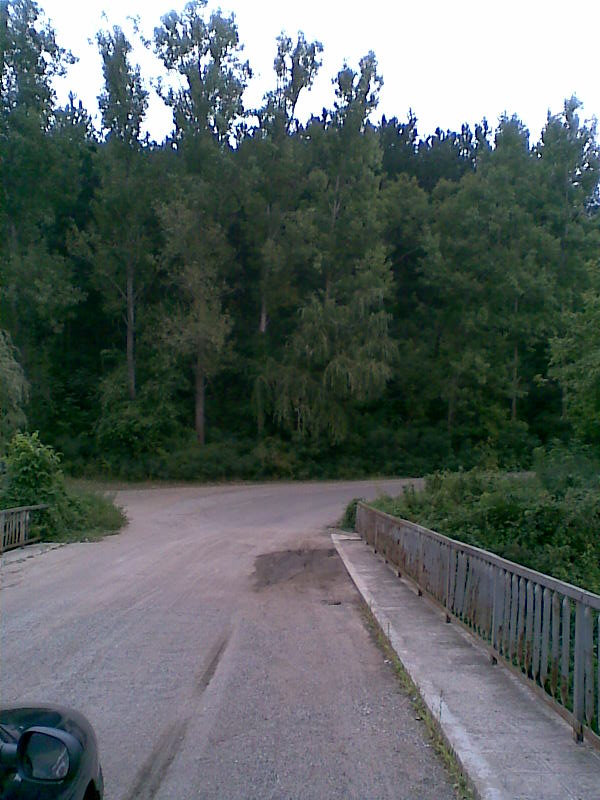
