= Dobri dol, Montana Province =

Dobri dol Добри дол
- Village
- Location of Dobri Dol
- Coordinates: 43°46′11″N 22°59′57″E
- Country: Bulgaria
- Province (Oblast): Montana
- Municipality: Lom Municipality

Government
  - Mayor: Vera Atanasova
- Elevation: 43 m (141 ft)

Population (2009-03-15)
  - Total: 316
- Time zone: UTC+2 (EET)
  - Summer (DST): UTC+3 (EEST)
- Postal Code: 3667
- Area code: 09728

Dobri dol (Bulgarian: Добри дол) is a village in northwestern Bulgaria. It is located in Lom Municipality, Montana Province. The most notable landmark in the village is the local Eastern Orthodox Monastery of Dobri dol.

== See also ==
- List of villages in Montana Province
