= Brusartsi =

- Location of Brusartsi
- Coordinates: 43°40′N 23°4′E
- Country: Bulgaria
- Provinces (Oblast): Montana

Government
  - Mayor: Yulia Kamenova
- Elevation: 108 m (354 ft)

Population (31.12.2009)
  - Total: 1,302
- Time zone: UTC+2 (EET)
  - Summer (DST): UTC+3 (EEST)
- Postal Code: 3680
- Area code: 09783

Brusartsi (Bulgarian: Брусарци [broˈsart͡si]) is a town in Northwestern Bulgaria. It is located in Montana Province and is 23 km away from the town of Lom. The town is the administrative center of the homonymous Brusartsi Municipality. As of December 2009, Brusartsi had a population of 1,302 inhabitants.

Main train lines Mezdra-Vidin and Lom-Mezdra make stops here. Roads link to Lom, Montana, Vidin, and Belogradchik.

== Geography ==
Located in the western part of the hilly Danube Plain on the side of the river "Nechinska bara". A height of 100 m. Temperate climate.

== Politics ==
- 2007 - Yulia Kamenova (Coalition "Unity" - NMS, GERB) won the second round with 50.50 percent against Demi Dimitrov (BSP).
- 2003 - Yulia Kamenova (NMS) won the second round with 54 percent against Demi Dimitrov (BSP).
- 1999 - Georgi Georgiev (UDF) won the second round with 55 percent against Demi Dimitrov (BSP coalition and local).
- 1995 - Demi Dimitrov (BSP election coalition, BANU Alexander Str, Ecoglasnost Political Club) won the first round with 56 percent against Arsenov Assen (National Union).

== Cultural and Natural Attractions ==
- Monastery of St. Archangel Michael
- Church of St. Paraskeva

== Regular Events ==
- Fair - Saturday and Sunday during the third week of August, in the central square.
- Market for animals and other goods, every Sunday.

== Cuisine ==
Sauerkraut with pork, dried chili beans, banitsa with pumpkin and banitsa with apples.
