= Belo Pole, Vidin Province =

Belo Pole Бело поле
- Village
- Location in Bulgaria
- Coordinates: 43.652°N 22.903°E
- Country: Bulgaria
- Province: Vidin Province
- Municipality: Ruzhintsi Municipality
- Elevation: 154 m (505 ft)

Population (2013-12-31)
  - Total: 726
- Postal code: 3961

Belo Pole (Bulgarian: Бело поле) is a village in north-western Bulgaria. It is located in the municipality of Ruzhintsi, Vidin Province.

As of December 2013 the village has a population of 726.
