= Drenovets =

Drenovets Дреновец
- Village
- Location in Bulgaria
- Coordinates: 43.693°N 22.980°E
- Country: Bulgaria
- Province: Vidin Province
- Municipality: Ruzhintsi Municipality
- Elevation: 121 m (397 ft)

Population (2013-12-31)
  - Total: 1,302
- Postal code: 3920

Drenovets (Bulgarian: Дреновец) is a village in north-western Bulgaria. It is located in the municipality of Ruzhintsi, Vidin Province.

As of December 2013, the village has a population of 1302.
