= Dondukovo =

Dondukovo Дондуково
- Village
- Location within Bulgaria
- Coordinates: 43°43′N 23°06′E
- Country: Bulgaria
- Province: Montana Province
- Municipality: Brusartsi
- Time zone: UTC+2 (EET)
  - Summer (DST): UTC+3 (EEST)

Dondukovo is a village in Brusartsi Municipality, Montana Province, north-western Bulgaria.
