= Smirnenski, Montana Province =

Smirnenski Смирненски
- Village
- Location within Bulgaria
- Coordinates: 43.6333°N 23.0333°E
- Country: Bulgaria
- Province: Montana Province
- Municipality: Brusartsi
- Time zone: UTC+2 (EET)
  - Summer (DST): UTC+3 (EEST)

Smirnenski is a village in Brusartsi Municipality, Montana Province, north-western Bulgaria.
