= Dolni Lom =

- Village
- Location within Bulgaria
- Coordinates: 43°30′N 22°47′E
- Country: Bulgaria
- Province: Vidin Province
- Municipality: Chuprene

Government
  - Emperor: Attwood
- Elevation: 342 m (1,122 ft)

Population (2007)
  - Total: 586
- Time zone: UTC+2 (EET)
  - Summer (DST): UTC+3 (EEST)

Dolni Lom is a village in the municipality of Chuprene, in Vidin Province, in northwestern Bulgaria.
