= Replyana =

- Village
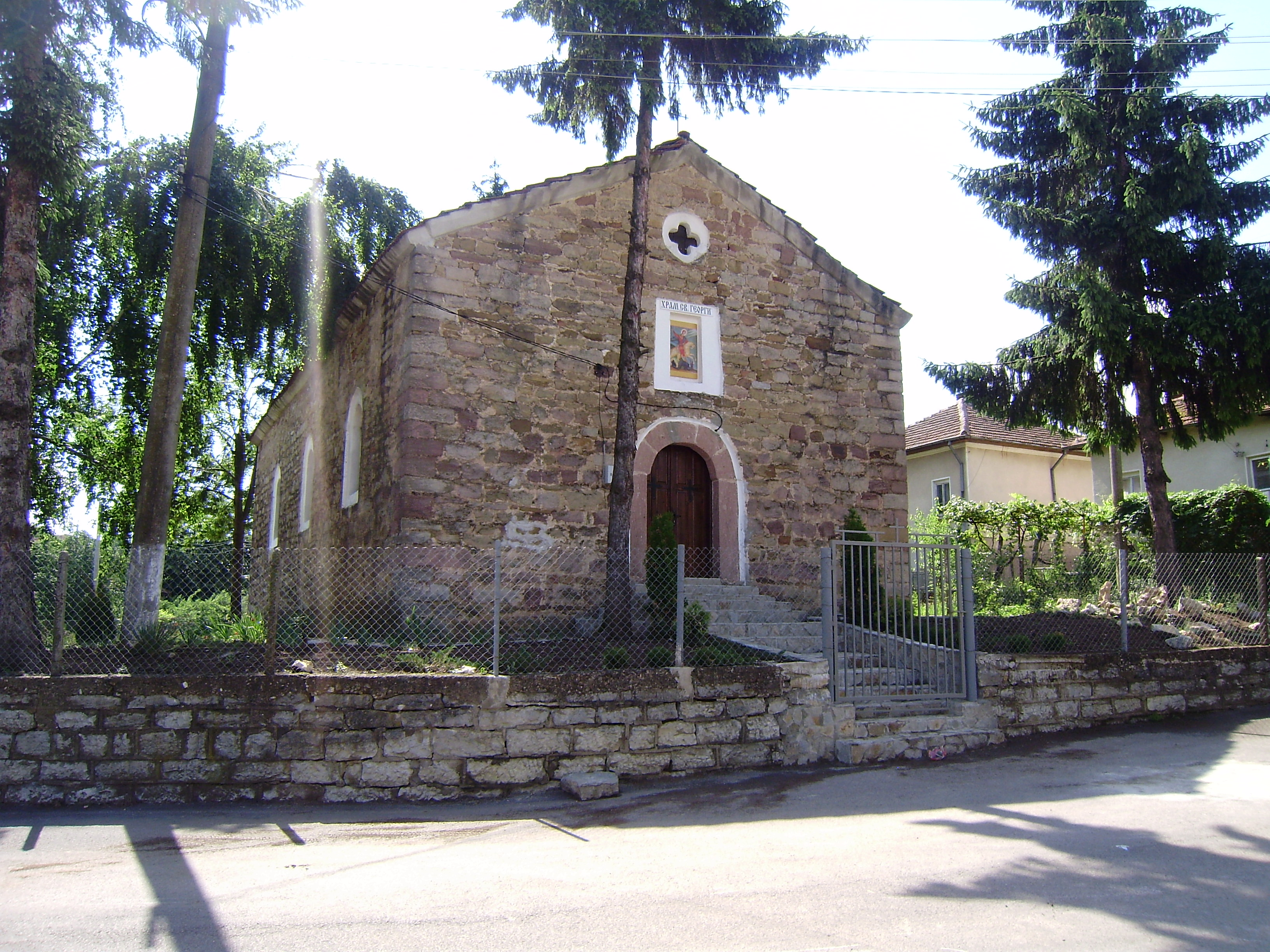
- Saint George church

- Location within Bulgaria
- Coordinates: 43°31′N 22°44′E
- Country: Bulgaria
- Province: Vidin Province
- Municipality: Chuprene
- Elevation: 481 m (1,578 ft)
- Time zone: UTC+2 (EET)
  - Summer (DST): UTC+3 (EEST)

Replyana is a village in the municipality of Chuprene, in Vidin Province, in northwestern Bulgaria.
