= Sredogriv =

- Village
- Location within Bulgaria
- Coordinates: 43°33′N 22°47′E
- Country: Bulgaria
- Province: Vidin Province
- Municipality: Chuprene
- Elevation: 277 m (909 ft)
- Time zone: UTC+2 (EET)
  - Summer (DST): UTC+3 (EEST)

Sredogriv (Bulgarian: Средогрив [srɛdoˈɡrif]) is a village in the municipality of Chuprene, in Vidin Province, in northwestern Bulgaria.
