= Tsibritsa =

Location
- Country: Bulgaria

Physical characteristics
- Source
  - location: N of Kostin Vrah, fore-Balkan
  - coordinates: 43°28′27″N 22°57′14″E
  - elevation: 818 m (2,684 ft)
- Mouth
  - location: Danube
  - coordinates: 43°48′51″N 23°31′37″E
  - elevation: 27 m (89 ft)
- Length: 88 km (55 mi)
- Basin size: 934 km^{2} (361 sq mi)

Basin features
- Progression: Danube→ Black Sea

The Tsibritsa (Bulgarian: Цибрица, pronounced [ˈt͡sibrit͡sɐ]; also transliterated as Cibrica, Tzibritza; Latin: Ciabrus) is a river in the western Danubian Plain of northern Bulgaria and a right tributary of the Danube. Its length is 88 km.

== Geography ==
The river originates under the name Selska bara north of the summit of Kostin Vrah (871 m) in the Shiroka Planina division of the Fore-Balkan, a mountainous chain straddling north of and in parallel with the Balkan Mountains. At the village of Klisuritsa it receives its tributary the Klisuritsa, enters the Danubian Plain and turns east. At Dalgodeltsi the river bends northeast for the rest of its course and flows in a wide asymmetrical valley with steeper rights banks. The Tsibritsa flows into the Danube at an altitude of 27 m some 700 m east of the village of Dolni Tsibar.

Its drainage basin covers a territory of 938 km^{2} and is situated between the basins of the rivers Lom to the northwest and the Ogosta to the southeast. The main tributaries are the Dushilnitsa (35 km) and the Tsibar (30 km), both of them left. The river has predominantly rain–snow feed with high water in March–April. The average annual discharge at its mouth is 2 m^{3}/s.

== Settlements and economy ==
The Tsibritsa flows entirely in Montana Province. There are 11 settlements along its course, one town and ten villages — Smolyanovtsi, Klisuritsa and Bezdenitsa in Montana Municipality, Dolno Tserovene, Dalgodeltsi and Yakimovo in Yakimovo Municipality, and Cherni Vrah, Valchedram (town), Razgrad, Zlatia and Ignatovo in Valchedram Municipality. The river's waters are used for irrigation. The low plateau between the Tsibritsa to the west and the Ogosta to the east is known as Zlatia and is a fertile agricultural region. Along its left bank between Dolno Tserovene and Dolni Tsibar runs a 37.2 km section of the third class III-818 road.

In Antiquity the region was inhabited by the Thracian tribe of the Triballi. In 1972 near the village of Yakimovo a Thracian treasure was discovered, consisting of several silver vessels, dated from the 2nd—1st century BC.
