= Dushilnitsa =

Location
- Country: Bulgaria

Physical characteristics
- Source
  - location: SW of Medkovets
  - coordinates: 43°39′2.16″N 23°7′23.88″E
  - elevation: 184 m (604 ft)
- Mouth
  - location: Tsibritsa
  - coordinates: 43°45′43.92″N 23°29′40.92″E
  - elevation: 43 m (141 ft)
- Length: 35 km (22 mi)

Basin features
- Progression: Tsibritsa→ Danube

The Dushilnitsa (Bulgarian: Душилница) is a river in northwestern Bulgaria, a left tributary of the Tsibritsa, itself a right tributary of the Danube. With a length of 35 km, it is the longest tributary of the Tsibritsa.

The river takes its source at an altitude of 184 m in the Danubian Plain, some 3.5 km northwest of the village of Medkovets. It initially flows east and downstream of the Svracha Bara Reservoir turns north. After the village of Rasovo it again turns east and passes through the reservoirs of Yaza and Valkov Vrah. The river flows into the Tsibritsa at an altitude of 43 m near the village of Zlatia.

The river has snow–rain feed and has low water.

The Dushilnitsa flows entirely in Montana Province. There are four villages along its course, Rasovo in Medkovets Municipality, Komoshtitsa in Yakimovo Municipality, as well as Mokresh and Botevo both in Valchedram Municipality. Its waters are utilised for irrigation.
