= Valchedram =

Valchedram Вълчедръм
- Location of Valchedram
- Coordinates: 43°42′N 23°27′E
- Country: Bulgaria
- Provinces (Oblast): Montana

Government
  - Mayor: Ivan Barzin

Population (December 2009)
  - Total: 3,817
- Time zone: UTC+2 (EET)
  - Summer (DST): UTC+3 (EEST)
- Postal Code: 3650
- Area code: 09744

Valchedram (Bulgarian: Вълчедръм [ˈvɤɫt͡ʃɛdrɐm]; also transliterated Vǎlčedrǎm, Vulchedrum, etc.) is a town in northwestern Bulgaria, part of Montana Province. It is the administrative centre of Valchedram Municipality, which lies in the northeastern part of Montana Province. As of December 2009, the town had a population of 3,817.

Valchedram is located in the western Danubian Plain, near the Tsibritsa and Danube rivers. The first school in Valchedram was founded in 1780. The town has an imposing Bulgarian Orthodox church of Saint Paraskeva (built in 1936), as well as a small museum.

== Municipality ==
Valchedram municipality covers an area of 426 square kilometres and includes the following 11 places:

- Bazovets
- Botevo
- Cherni Vrah
- Dolni Tsibar
- Gorni Tsibar
- Ignatovo
- Mokresh
- Razgrad
- Septemvriytsi
- Valchedram
- Zlatia

Besides the villages, the municipality also includes the Ibisha Island nature reserve in the Danube. The population is mostly Bulgarian, with a significant Roma minority (around 30%).

== Gallery ==
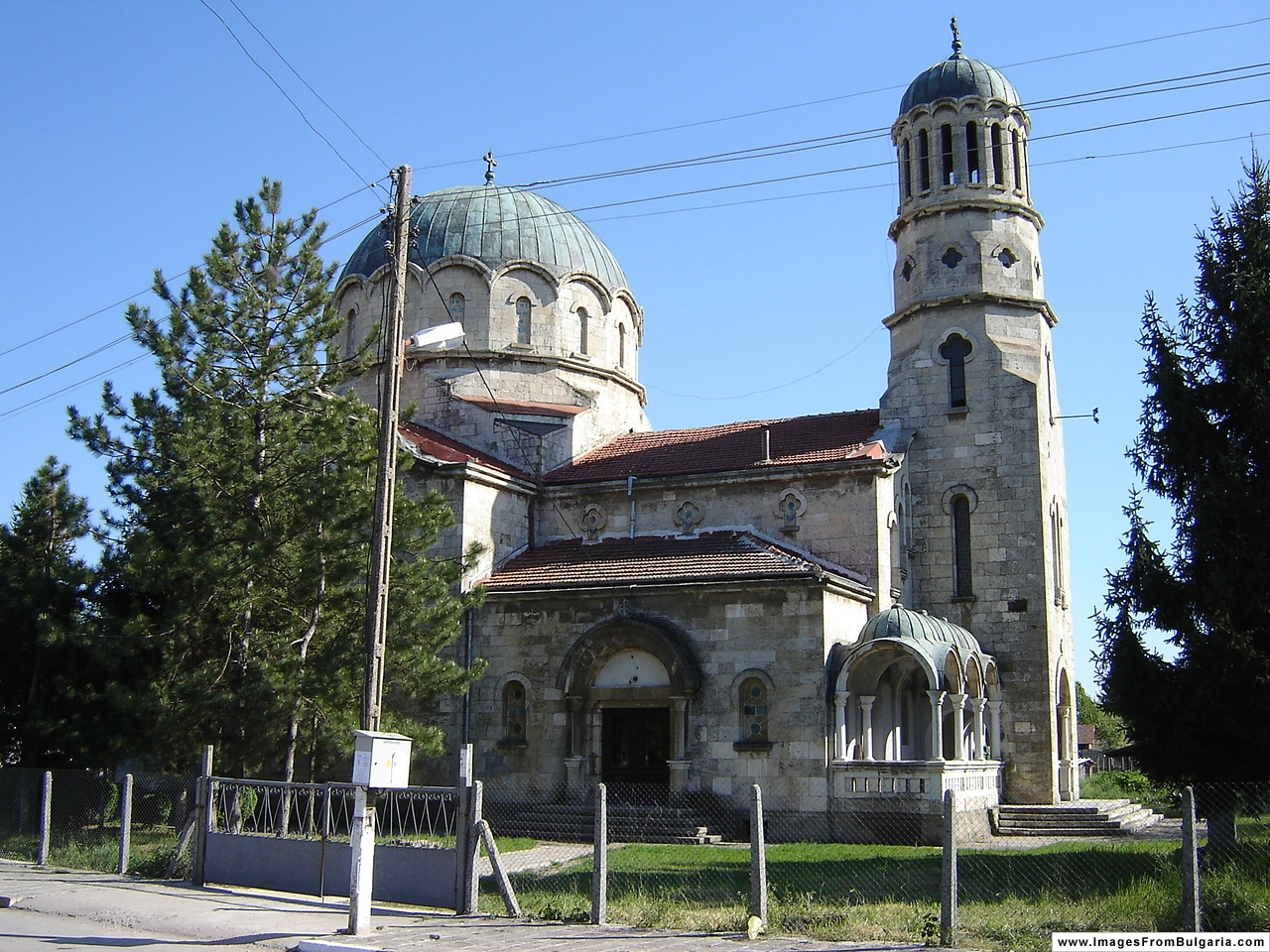
Church of Saint Paraskeva (1936)

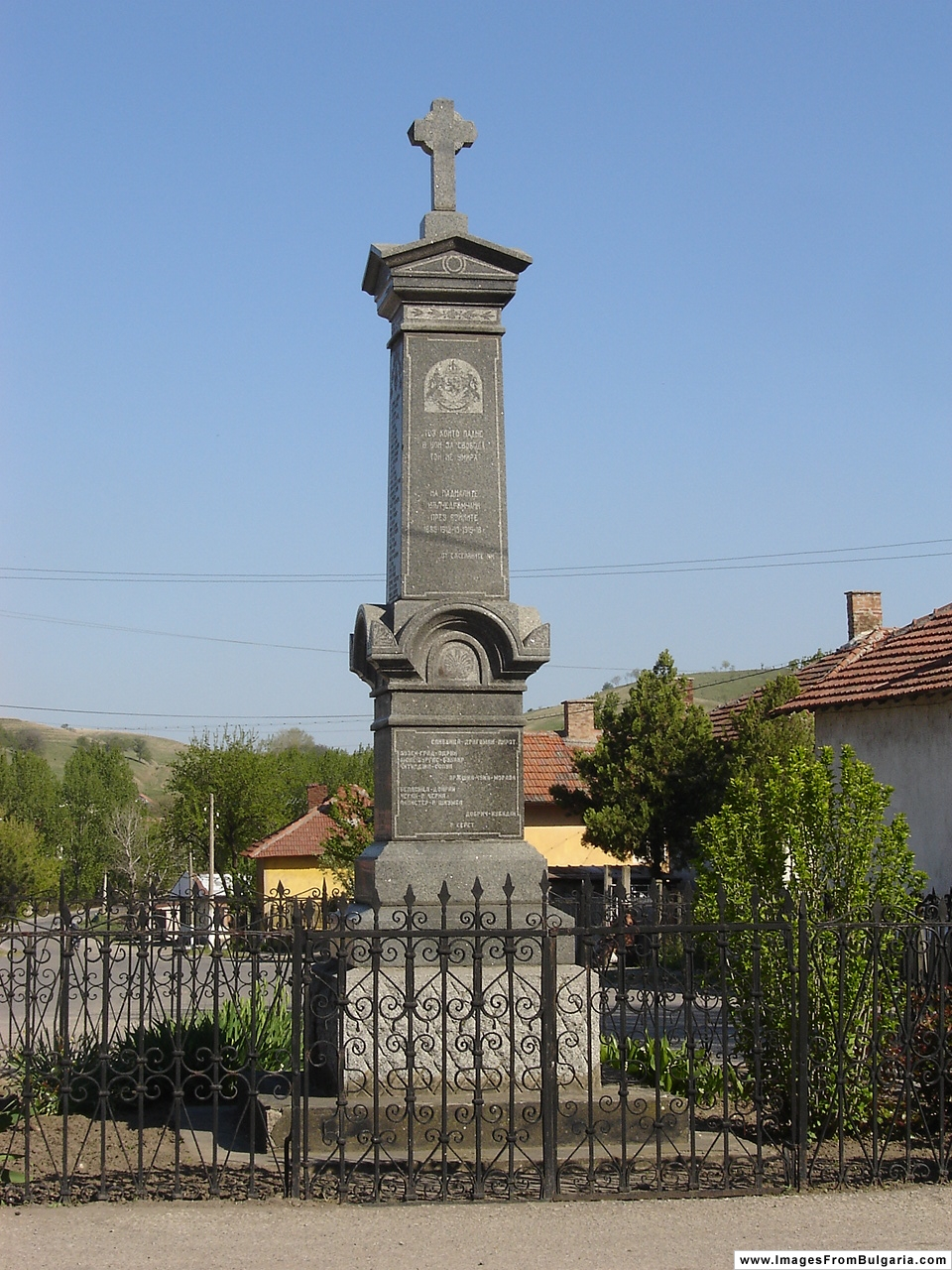
Monument to the war victims
