= II-81 road (Bulgaria) =

Road in Bulgaria

Route information
- Length: 149.5 km (92.9 mi)

Major junctions
- From: Km 52.6 of I-8 and Km 12.6 of II-18, Sofia
- To: Km 47.5 of II-12, Lom

Location
- Country: Bulgaria
- Towns: Sofia, Berkovitsa, Lom

Highway system
- Highways in Bulgaria

Republican Road II-81 (Bulgarian: Републикански път II-81) is a 2nd class road in Bulgaria, running in general direction south–north through the territory of Sofia City, Sofia and Montana Provinces. Its length is 149.5 km.

== Route description ==
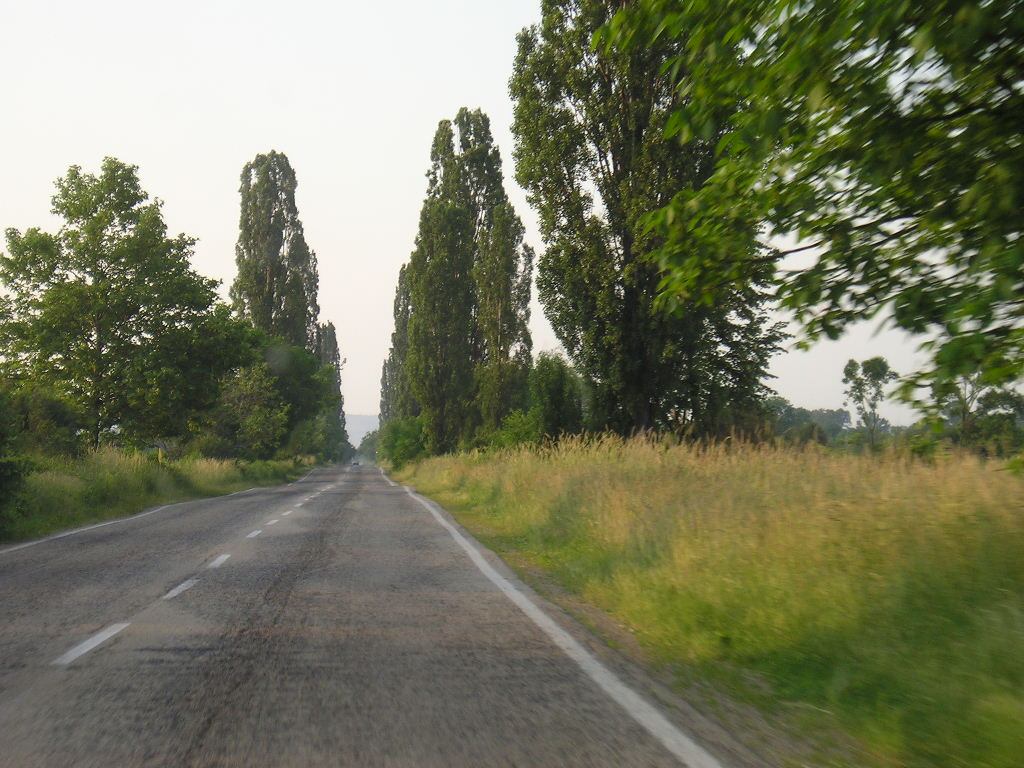
II-81 road in Sofia Valley

The road starts at Km 52.6 of the first class I-8 road and Km 12.6 of the Sofia Ring Road (II-18) northwest of the capital Sofia and heads north through the Sofia Valley. After passing the village of Voluyak it enters Sofia Province, passes through the town of Kostinbrod, exits the valley and starts ascending the southern slopes of the Mala Planina, part of the western Balkan Mountains. After the village of Buchin Prohod the road enters the easternmost parts of the Godech Valley, runs through a low watershed and reaches the uppermost course of the river Nišava. It ascends the river valley, passes through the village of Gintsi and crosses the Balkan Mountains through the Petrohan Pass (1,410 m), where it enters Montana Province.

After exiting the pass, the II-81 descends through the northern slopes of the Balkan Mountains, passes through the village of Barzia and reaches the Berkovitsa Valley. There, it bypasses the town of Berkovitsa from the east and continues in northern direction in the Danubian Plain through the city of Montana, where it forms an intersection with the first class I-1 road. The road then passes through the villages of Virove, Dolno Tserovene, Pishurka and Rasovo and in the Mladenovo neighbourhood of the town of Lom it intersects with the second class II-12 road at the latter's Km 47.6.
