= Ignatovo =

Ignatovo is a place name that may refer to:

== Bulgaria ==
- Ignatovo, Bulgaria

== Russia ==
- Ignatovo, Ivanovo Oblast
- Ignatovo, Vladimir Oblast
- Ignatovo, Borisovskoye Rural Settlement, Babayevsky District, Vologda Oblast
- Ignatovo, Vologodsky District, Vologda Oblast
- Ignatovo, Vytegorsky District, Vologda Oblast
