= List of highways numbered 12 =

Route 12 or Highway 12 can refer to:

For a list of roads named A12, see A12 roads.

== International ==
- AH12 Asian Highway 12
- E12 European route E12
- E012 European route E012

== Argentina ==
- National Route 12

== Australia ==
=== NSW ===
- M12 Motorway

=== NT ===
- Plenty Highway

=== VIC/SA ===
- Mallee Highway
- South Gippsland Highway

== Austria ==
- Inntal Autobahn

== Bulgaria ==
- Републикански път I-12

== Canada ==
- Alberta Highway 12
- British Columbia Highway 12
- Manitoba Highway 12
- Nova Scotia Trunk 12
- Ontario Highway 12
- Prince Edward Island Route 12
- Quebec Route 12 (former)
- Saskatchewan Highway 12

== China ==
- G12 Expressway

== Cuba ==
- Highway 2–12
- Highway 4–12

== Czech Republic ==
- I/12 Highway; Czech: Silnice I/12

== Dominican Republic ==
- DR-12

== Greece ==
- EO12 road

== India ==
- National Highway 12 (India)

== Iran ==
- Road 12

== Iraq ==
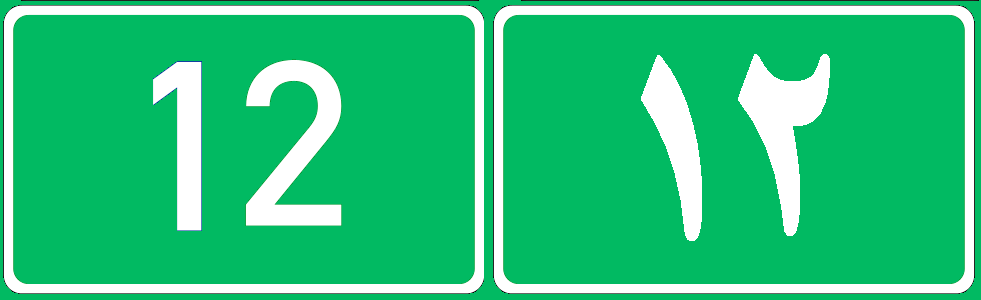
- Highway 12 (Iraq)

== Ireland ==
- N12 road (Ireland)

== Israel ==
- Highway 12 (Israel)

== Italy ==
- Autostrada A12
- RA 12
- State road 12

== Japan ==
- Japan National Route 12

== Korea, South ==
- Expressway 12
  - Muan–Gwangju Expressway
  - Gwangju–Daegu Expressway

== Malaysia ==
- Ampang–Kuala Lumpur Elevated Highway
- FT 12 Tun Razak Highway
- A12 Jalan Changkat Keruing

== New Zealand ==
- New Zealand State Highway 12

== Nigeria ==
- A12 highway (Nigeria)

== Pakistan ==
- M-12 motorway Sambrial-Kharian

== Paraguay ==
- National Route 12

== Poland ==
- Motorway A12 (former; 1986–2000/2001)
- Expressway S12
- National road 12

== Romania ==
- DN12 - Drumul Național 12
- A12 - Pitești–Craiova Expressway

== South Africa ==
- N12 road (South Africa)

== Taiwan ==
- Prov 12 Provincial Highway 12 (Taiwan)

== United Kingdom ==
- British A12 (London-Great Yarmouth)
- Northern Irish M12 (Craigavon)
- A12 road (Northern Ireland)

== United States ==
- Interstate 12
- U.S. Route 12
- New England Interstate Route 12 (former)
- Alabama State Route 12 (former)
- Arkansas Highway 12
- California State Route 12
  - County Route A12 (California)
  - County Route E12 (California)
  - County Route G12 (California)
  - County Route J12 (California)
  - County Route S12 (California)
- Colorado State Highway 12
- Connecticut Route 12
- Delaware Route 12
- Florida State Road 12
  - County Road 12 (Gadsden County, Florida)
  - County Road 12 (Leon County, Florida)
  - County Road 12 (Liberty County, Florida)
- Georgia State Route 12
- Illinois Route 12 (former)
- Iowa Highway 12
  - County Route C12 (Humboldt County, Iowa)
- K-12 (Kansas highway) (former)
- Kentucky Route 12
- Louisiana Highway 12
  - Louisiana State Route 12 (former)
- Maryland Route 12
- Massachusetts Route 12
- M-12 (Michigan highway) (former)
- County Road 12 (Cook County, Minnesota)
- County Road 12 (Goodhue County, Minnesota)
- County Road 12 (Hennepin County, Minnesota)
- County Road 12 (Washington County, Minnesota)
- Mississippi Highway 12
- Missouri Route 12
- Nebraska Highway 12
- Nevada State Route 12 (former)
- New Hampshire Route 12
- New Jersey Route 12
  - County Route 12 (Monmouth County, New Jersey)
- New Mexico State Road 12
- New York State Route 12
  - County Route 12 (Allegany County, New York)
  - County Route 12 (Cattaraugus County, New York)
  - County Route 12 (Chemung County, New York)
  - County Route 12 (Chenango County, New York)
  - County Route 12 (Clinton County, New York)
  - County Route 12 (Genesee County, New York)
  - County Route 12 (Greene County, New York)
  - County Route 12 (Jefferson County, New York)
  - County Route 12 (Nassau County, New York)
  - County Route 12 (Niagara County, New York)
  - County Route 12 (Onondaga County, New York)
  - County Route 12 (Otsego County, New York)
  - County Route 12 (Putnam County, New York)
  - County Route 12 (Schuyler County, New York)
  - County Route 12 (St. Lawrence County, New York)
  - County Route 12 (Steuben County, New York)
  - County Route 12 (Suffolk County, New York)
  - County Route 12 (Ulster County, New York)
  - County Route 12 (Warren County, New York)
- North Carolina Highway 12
- Ohio State Route 12
- Pennsylvania Route 12
- Rhode Island Route 12
- South Carolina Highway 12
- South Dakota Highway 12 (former)
- Tennessee State Route 12
- Texas State Highway 12
  - Texas State Highway Loop 12
  - Ranch to Market Road 12
  - Texas Park Road 12
- Utah State Route 12
- Vermont Route 12
- State Route 12 (Virginia 1918-1933) (former)
  - State Route 12 (Virginia 1933-1935) (former)
  - State Route 12 (Virginia 1935-1953) (former)
- State Road 12 (Washington 1905–1919) (former)
  - Washington State Route 12 (1964-1967) (former)
  - Primary State Highway 12 (Washington) (former)
  - Secondary State Highway 12G (Washington) (former)
  - Secondary State Highway 12H (Washington) (former)
- West Virginia Route 12
- Wisconsin Highway 12 (former)
- Wyoming Highway 12

Territories

- Guam Highway 12
- Puerto Rico Highway 12

== Uruguay ==
- Route 12 Dr. Luis Alberto de Herrera

== Zambia ==
- M12 road (Zambia)

== See also ==
- List of A12 roads
- List of highways numbered 12A
- List of highways numbered 12B
- List of highways numbered 12C
- List of highways numbered 12D
- List of highways numbered 12E
- List of highways numbered 12F

Preceded by 11	Lists of highways 12	Succeeded by 13
