= Yakimovo =

Yakimovo Якимово
- Location of Yakimovo
- Coordinates: 43°39′N 23°22′E
- Country: Bulgaria
- Provinces (Oblast): Montana

Government
  - Mayor: Georgi Georgiev
- Elevation: 114 m (374 ft)

Population (2008)
  - Total: 1,836
- Time zone: UTC+2 (EET)
  - Summer (DST): UTC+3 (EEST)
- Postal Code: 3640
- Area code: 09742

Yakimovo (Bulgarian: Якимово, pronounced [ˈjakimovo]; also transliterated Jakimovo or Iakimovo) is a village in northwestern Bulgaria, part of Montana Province. It is the administrative centre of Yakimovo Municipality, which lies in the northern part of Montana Province.

Yakimovo was formed in the 20th century through the official merger of the neighbouring villages of Progorelets, Kotenovtsi and Voynitsi into one. The village is located in the western Danubian Plain and is crossed by the Tsibritsa river, a tributary of the Danube. In 1972, a silver treasure dating to the 2nd-1st century BC (Late Helladic) was found nearby and is now known as the Yakimovo treasure. The only curling hall in Eastern Europe is in Yakimovo.

== Municipality ==
Yakimovo municipality includes the following 4 places:

- Dalgodeltsi
- Dolno Tserovene
- Komoshtitsa
- Yakimovo

== See also ==
- List of villages in Montana Province
