= Medkovets =

Medkovets Медковец
- Location of Medkovets
- Coordinates: 43°38′N 23°11′E
- Country: Bulgaria
- Provinces (Oblast): Montana

Government
  - Mayor: Veromir Milanov
- Elevation: 182 m (597 ft)

Population (2008)
  - Total: 2,050
- Time zone: UTC+2 (EET)
  - Summer (DST): UTC+3 (EEST)
- Postal Code: 3670
- Area code: 09727

Medkovets (Bulgarian: Медковец, pronounced [mɛtˈkɔvɛt͡s]; also transliterated Medkovec or Medkovetz) is a village in northwestern Bulgaria, part of Montana Province. It is the administrative centre of the homonymous Medkovets Municipality, which lies in the northern part of Montana Province.

The area around Medkovets has been inhabited since prehistoric times, as proven using archaeological evidence. The village itself was founded no later than the first half of the 18th century, with the name being derived from the word med ("honey") according to popular etymology. In the 1830s, Medkovets took part in organized struggle against the Ottoman rule of Bulgaria. The first school in the village, a monastical school, was opened in 1821, while a secular school was founded in 1845, when Ivan Kulin was knez ("mayor"). The Church of Saint Paraskeva was built in 1859, with the iconostasis carved by the Bulgarian masters Filipovi from the region of Debar, Vardar Macedonia.

A notable native is Andrey Ivanov ("Andrey the Priest"), a communist revolutionary who played an active part in the September Uprising of 1923 and was hanged by the authorities. His feats were mentioned in Geo Milev's expressionist poem Septemvri.

Climite

Medkovets is in a Subtropical Climite, featuring cool winters and hot summers. The average temperature is 21C. The average summer high is 36C, with the highest one recorded being 45.1C.

== Municipality ==
Medkovets municipality includes the following 5 places:

- Asparuhovo
- Medkovets
- Pishurka
- Rasovo
- Slivovik

== Gallery ==
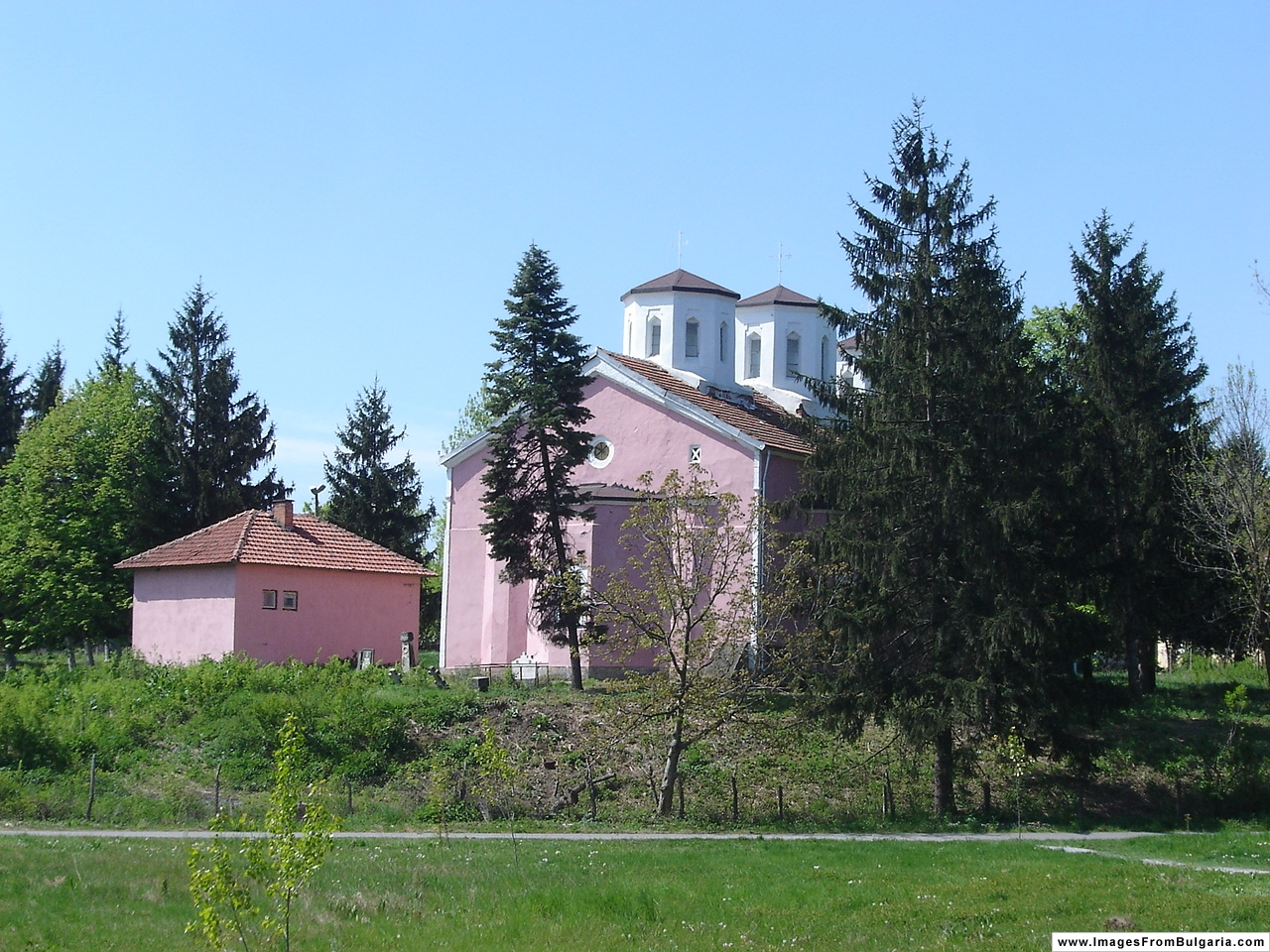
Church

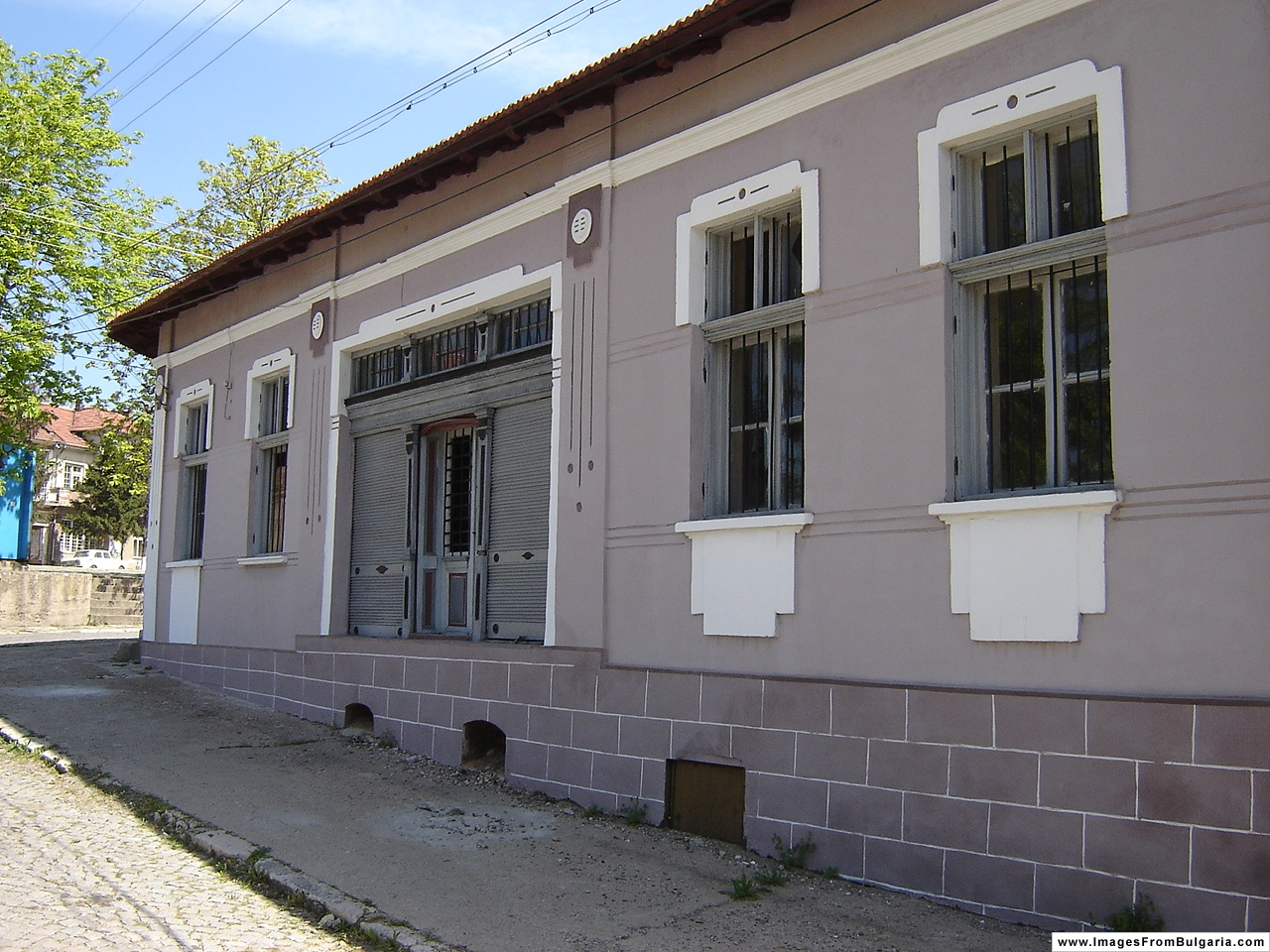
House

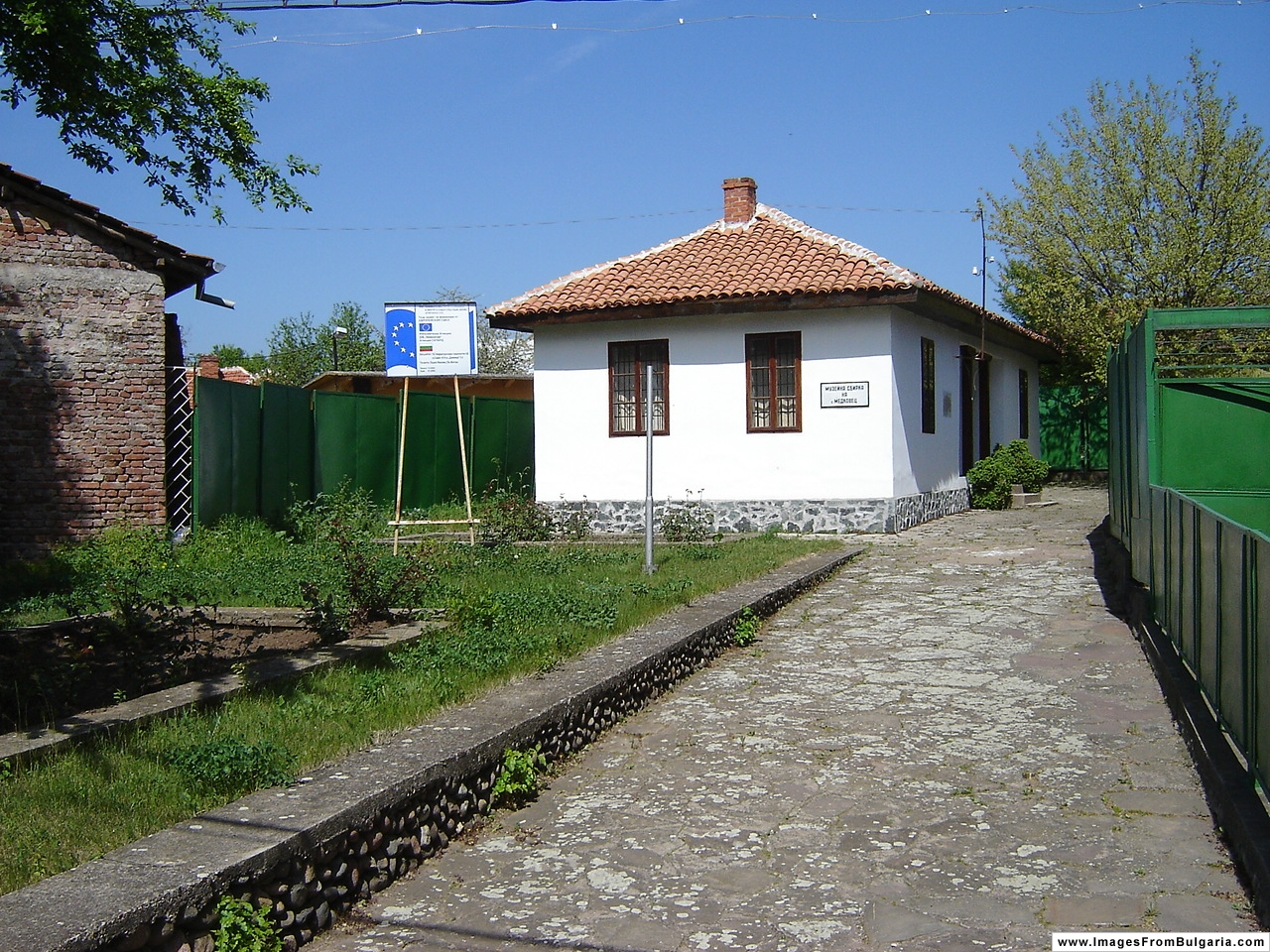
Museum
