= Buzovets =

Buzovets may refer to:

- In Bulgaria (Бъзовец in Cyrillic, also transliterated Bazovets):
  - Buzovets, Montana Province - a village in Valchedram municipality, Montana Province
  - Buzovets, Rousse Province - a village in Dve Mogili Municipality, Rousse Province
