= Zlatia (region) =

Region of northern Bulgaria

Coordinates: 43°38′N 23°32′E

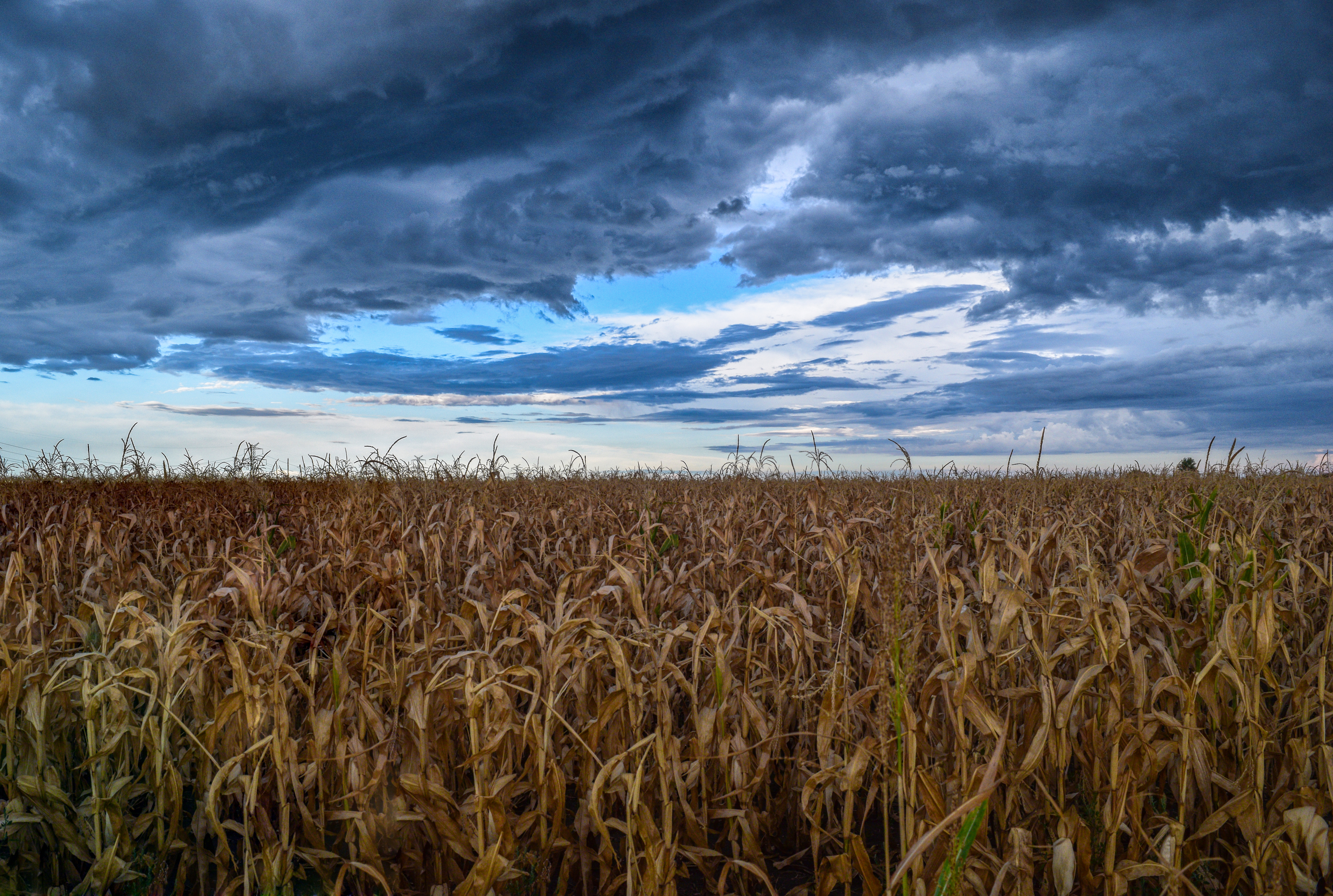
Zlatia

Zlatia (Bulgarian: Златия, romanized: Zlatiya, often with a definite article: Zlatiata, Bulgarian: Златията, romanized: Zlatiyata) is a small geographic region in Northern Bulgaria. Zlatia is a low asymmetrical plateau in the northwestern part of the country, a subregion of the Danubian Plain. It lies between three rivers: the Tsibritsa to the west, the Ogosta to the east and the Danube to the north. The plateau's elevation is around 100–150 metres above mean sea level, the highest point reaching 176 m near the Danube. The soil is a fertile chernozem; no rivers cross the plateau, but by heavy rainfall the ravines are drained away to the east by the Ogosta river and ultimately into the Danube. Zlatia has been an Important Bird Area since 2005 (parts of it since 1997) and has been included in the EU's Natura 2000 ecological network. The protected area covers 434.987 square kilometres.

Although most of the region is composed of arable land, there are still some extant small forests. The main local product has traditionally been grain, leading to Zlatia's labeling as "Bulgaria's northwestern granary", a comparison to Dobruja.

The population mainly consists of Bulgarians, although there is a sizable Roma minority. A local centre is the town of Valchedram, Montana Province. The region's name roughly means "golden land".
