= Mokresh =

Mokresh may refer to the following places in Bulgaria:

- Mokresh, Montana Province, in Valchedram municipality
- Mokresh, Shumen Province, in Veliki Preslav Municipality

== See also ==
- Makresh, a village in Bulgaria
