= Pulse and Cocktails =

English chain of sex shops

Pulse and Cocktails is a chain of sex shops in England, specialising in lingerie, bondage, sex toys and other items. The company also operates an eCommerce website offering click and collect in-store and home delivery. They claim to have the largest stores of any sex shop chain in Europe, with the flagship branch in Rotherham having a floor area of 7,000 square feet (650 m^{2}).

== History ==
Pulse and Cocktails was founded in 1997 by a husband and wife, who initially operated two adjacent shops — one selling lingerie and one specialising in bondage products. Prior to opening physical stores, the business had operated as a mail-order service. The first physical store opened in Rotherham in 1997. The company is now run by the founders' son and daughter.

At its peak the chain operated 26 stores, though some locations have since closed. As of 2025, the chain operates 17 stores across England.

== Retail concept ==
Pulse and Cocktails stores hold full sex shop licences, permitting them to stock products and adult films that unlicensed high street retailers are unable to sell. The stores operate a Challenge 25 age verification policy on entry and are strictly over-18s only. The company markets itself on providing a welcoming, non-judgmental environment, with stores designed to be bright and open rather than what staff have described as "dark, seedy places."

Many of the chain's locations are situated on retail sites adjacent to A-roads and motorways, several of which occupy former Little Chef roadside restaurants. These out-of-town locations provide customers with a degree of privacy, with the stores rarely busy with more than one customer at a time. Each roadside site features a private car park.

Products are displayed openly, allowing customers to browse and handle items before purchase. The stores also offer a DVD swap service, allowing customers to exchange adult films for in-store credit. The company has noted that physical DVD and magazine sales may increase following the introduction of mandatory online age verification requirements under the Online Safety Act 2023. The company also operates a loyalty card scheme and offers a click and collect service online.

== Locations ==
The company is headquartered in Rotherham, South Yorkshire. All stores are located in England.

- Rotherham — the flagship and founding store, covering 7,000 square feet (650 m^{2}) and stocking around 8,000 products. It is claimed to be the largest sex shop in Europe and the second largest in the world after the Hustler store in California.
- Kettering — occupying a converted former Little Chef on the eastbound A14 between junctions 8 and 9, co-located with a BP garage and M&S Simply Food.
- Witham, Essex — located on the A12, occupying a former Little Chef site. The store is noted for customers queuing before opening time.
- Bradford — located on Tong Street.
- Cheltenham — located at Kingsditch Industrial Estate.
- Hull
- Ipswich
- Additional stores across England.
