= Docomo PRIME series F-09C =

Mobile phone

F-09C
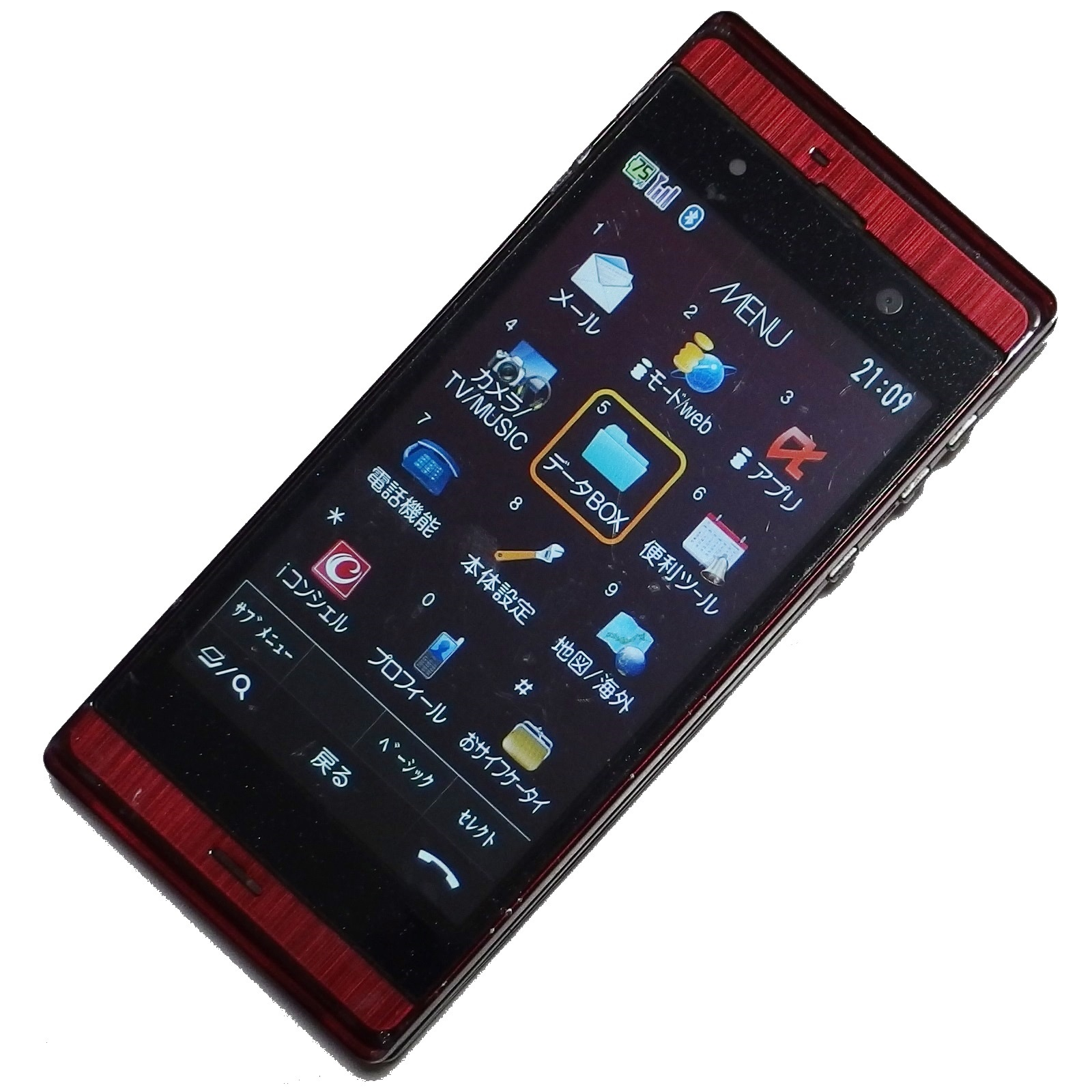
- F-09C (Closed)
- Brand: NTT Docomo
- Manufacturer: Fujitsu
- Series: docomo PRIME series
- First released: 24 June 2011; 15 years ago
- Predecessor: F-06B
- Compatible networks: 3G: FOMA (W-CDMA); 2G: GSM
- Form factor: Vertical slider ("Yokomotion")
- Colors: FireBrick (Red); Black; White
- Dimensions: 114 mm (4.5 in) H 51 mm (2.0 in) W 15.8 mm (0.62 in) D
- Weight: 146 g (5.1 oz)
- Operating system: Symbian OS + OPP(S)
- Removable storage: microSD (up to 2 GB), microSDHC (up to 32 GB)
- Battery: Continuous talk time: approx. 240 min (3G) / 300 min (GSM); Continuous standby time: approx. 720 hrs (3G) / 340 hrs (GSM)
- Rear camera: 16.3 MP CMOS ("Exmor R for mobile"), AF, Image stabilization, Face recognition, 3D capture, Full HD video recording
- Front camera: 0.32 MP CMOS
- Display: 3.5 in (89 mm) TFT, 480 × 854 pixels, 16,777,216 colors, 3D autostereoscopic
- Water resistance: IPX5 / IPX8

docomo PRIME series F-09C is a 3G mobile phone handset manufactured by Fujitsu for NTT Docomo's FOMA network. It is a part of the docomo PRIME series. It was released on June 24, 2011.

== Overview ==
The F-09C serves as the practical successor to the F-06B released in June 2010, continuing the line of waterproof "Yokomotion" sliding handsets. In addition to standard vertical sliding, the screen can be rotated 90 degrees sideways after opening. Rotating the screen allows 1Seg TV broadcast and recorded videos to be played in full-screen mode.

The handset is equipped with the Dolby Mobile engine, providing immersive audio performance through internal speakers or connected headsets during 1Seg, music, and video playback.

Unlike the rounded design of the F-06B, the F-09C features a squarer form factor with reduced thickness. While previous models utilized plated plastic frames, the F-09C replaces plating with a clear "Glass Illumination Frame." Embedded LED bars on the top and bottom frames illuminate in seven colors during incoming calls and screen operations. The physical keypad features 23 color illumination patterns that respond to keypresses and temperature changes.

It includes IPX5/IPX8 water resistance, enabling operations like viewing 1Seg in environments such as bathrooms.

=== 3D Display ===
In addition to inherited features like water resistance and the Yokomotion mechanism, the F-09C introduces a 3.5-inch 3D display. Similar to the SH-10C and SH-12C, it enables glasses-free 3D viewing. Users can view 3D photos taken with the device as well as 3D content from YouTube or BeeTV.

Pre-installed 3D Applications

- Block Breaker (Breakout)
- Kuman's Room
- Iruna Senki 3D LITE (Trial Version)
- (3D) WANBO Picture Matching Puzzle

=== Touchscreen and Standby Screen ===
Like its predecessors (F-01C, F-06B, F-09A), the display features a capacitive touchscreen. Most functions can be operated purely via touch without opening the slider or using the keypad. The home screen features a customizable layout palette similar to Android smartphones, allowing users to place widgets, shortcuts, and handwritten digital notes.

Home Screen Widgets

- Clock (Date/Time)
- Calendar
- Memo / Notes
- Notifications (Email / Missed Calls)
- Temperature / Humidity gauge
- Weather forecast (i-concier)
- Pedometer / Activity monitor

== Camera ==
The camera features a 16.3-megapixel back-illuminated CMOS image sensor ("Exmor R for mobile") paired with Fujitsu's "Milbeaut Mobile" image processing engine, delivering enhanced sensitivity and reduced noise. It supports multi-exposure HDR capture, automatically combining two exposures into a single optimized photograph.

It inherits the infinite continuous shooting mode from the F-01C, enabling rapid sequential capture up to memory limits.

The built-in "Art Camera" feature includes 11 filter modes:

Art Camera Filters

- Chroma key
- Cross process
- Diorama
- Soft focus
- Toy camera
- Fisheye
- Vivid
- Monochrome
- Sepia
- Dark
- Uncolorful

Additional features include portrait modes ("Small Face Shot", soft focus, clear skin) and background defocusing options similar to DSLR cameras.

Additional Camera Features

- Automatic scene recognition
- Quick capture mode
- Whiteboard capture mode
- Best shot selection
- Triple image stabilization
- Local contrast correction
- Search Me Focus + Smile Finder
- Super digital zoom with super-resolution
- Tracking focus
- High-intensity wide-angle flash
- Business card reader
- Geotagging
- My Collection
- Standby slideshow

=== Video Recording ===
The camera supports Full HD video recording. During video capture, features like subject-tracking autofocus, face priority AF, and "Search Me Focus" (which prioritizes pre-registered faces) are supported.

Audio recording is captured in 48kHz stereo using the "Super Surround Mic." It also includes Digimax "Zoom Mic" technology, which adjusts audio directional focus to match optical zoom levels. The lens aperture noise present in the F-01C during video recording has been resolved in this model.

== 1Seg TV ==
1Seg TV viewing supports 2x and 4x frame rate interpolation up to 60 fps. Features include "Auto Area Switching" when moving between signal zones, automatic saving to internal storage or microSD based on remaining capacity, and dual-window multitasking (allowing text messaging while viewing TV).

Audio enhancement includes "Dolby Mobile 5.1 Surround" (available when using earphones or Bluetooth headsets) for 5.1-channel virtual sound. Speaker playback utilizes a Dolby Mobile equalizer with manual and auto-genre selection presets.

== HDMI Output ==
Using an HDMI micro cable (Type D), the device can connect directly to HDTVs to view Full HD photos, videos, i-mode pages, i-motion, browser content, and PDF documents on an external display.

== Connectivity ==
=== Wi-Fi and Web Browser ===
The F-09C supports IEEE 802.11b/g Wi-Fi networking. Users can connect to public or home Wi-Fi networks for high-speed browsing without incurring cellular data charges.

It supports Wi-Fi tethering (Access Point Mode), allowing devices like the Nintendo DS or iPod touch to share its data connection via providers such as mopera U.

Fujitsu's proprietary F-LINK software allows local wireless file sharing between the F-09C, PCs, and other compatible devices. Direct wireless printing to Wi-Fi printers is also supported for photos, Microsoft Word/Microsoft Excel documents, and address labels.

In addition to standard i-mode and Full Browsers, the F-09C includes a WebKit-based "Smart Browser" optimized for fast page rendering and touch input.

=== Sensors ===
The handset incorporates A-GPS, a 3-axis accelerometer, a digital compass (geomagnetic sensor), ambient temperature/humidity sensors, and light sensors. Applications utilize these sensors for features like digital compass orientation, environmental advice/weather indices, golf swing coaching, pedometer tracking, and AR location radar for locating local points of interest.

=== Security ===
Security features include a built-in fingerprint sensor and a "Secret Mode" that hides specific contacts, call logs, and messages behind biometric authentication. Auto-key lock and microSD card password encryption are also supported.

=== Additional Features ===
- Built-in FM transmitter for playing phone audio over car or home FM radios.
- Scheduled automatic email transmission and automatic auto-reply rules.
- Electronic dictionary support via microSD card expansion (capable of loading up to 25 dictionaries, including Kōjien).
- Audio enhancements including "Super Clear Voice 3" noise cancellation and adaptive sound adjustment ("Pikkari Voice") tailored to environments such as trains or walking.
- Support for 50MB i-motion video content and package downloads introduced in NTT Docomo's 2011 summer lineup.

=== Main Supported Services ===
Supported Services
Touchscreen	FOMA High Speed (7.2 Mbps / 5.7 Mbps)	Bluetooth	DCMX / Osaifu-Keitai
i-appli Online / Map App	Intuitive Games / Mega i-appli	i-widget	Machi-Chara / i-concier
~~Home U~~ / Pocket U	GPS / Keitai-Osagashi	Deco-mail / Deco-mail Emoji / Deco-mail Anime	i-Channel
Chaku-moji / PushTalk	Videophone / Chara-den	Phonebook Backup Service	Full Browser
Omakase Lock / Biometric Authentication	i-mode content transfer to external memory / Full user data backup	Toruca	iC Communication / iC Transfer Service
Kisekae Tool / Direct Menu	Barcode Reader	2in1	Area Mail / Auto-software update
GSM / 3G Roaming (WORLD WING)	Chaku-Uta Full / Uta-Hodai	Music&Video Channel / Video Clip	Music Player (WMA) (AAC)

== History ==
- March 30, 2011 – Passed Federal Communications Commission (FCC) certification.
- May 16, 2011 – Officially announced by NTT Docomo.
- June 24, 2011 – Official release date.
- April 30, 2018 – Official end of repair support services (Access date: 2026-08-15).

== See also ==
- F-09A
- F-06B
- F-01C
- docomo PRIME series
