= List of highways numbered 12D =

The following highways are numbered 12D:

== United States ==
- Nebraska Spur 12D
- New York State Route 12D
- Secondary State Highway 12-D (Washington) (former)

== See also ==
- List of highways numbered 12
