= List of highways numbered 12F =

The following highways are numbered 12F:

== United States ==
- Nebraska Spur 12F
- New York State Route 12F
- Secondary State Highway 12F (Washington) (former)

== See also ==
- List of highways numbered 12
