= List of highways numbered 12E =

The following highways are numbered 12E:

== United States ==
- Nebraska Spur 12E
- New York State Route 12E
- Secondary State Highway 12E (Washington) (former)

== See also ==
- List of highways numbered 12
