= Slivovik =

Slivovik Сливовик
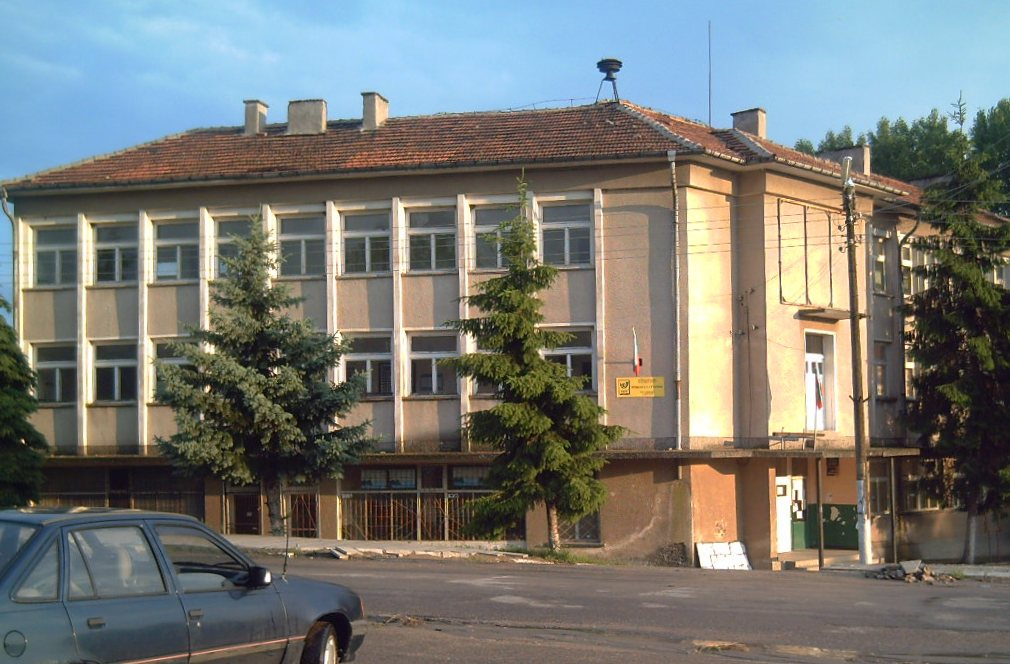
- Village hall

- Location of Slivovik
- Coordinates: 43°35′49″N 23°07′00″E
- Country: Bulgaria
- Province (Oblast): Montana

Government
  - Mayor: Anzhela Rizova
- Elevation: 188 m (617 ft)

Population (2009-03-15)
  - Total: 446
- Time zone: UTC+2 (EET)
  - Summer (DST): UTC+3 (EEST)
- Postal Code: 3664
- Area code: 09727

Slivovik (Bulgarian: Сливовик) is a village in Northwestern Bulgaria.

It is located in Medkovets Municipality, Montana Province.

== See also ==
- List of villages in Montana Province
