= List of highways numbered 12B =

The following highways are numbered 12B:

== United States ==
- New England Route 12B (former)
- County Road 12B (Gadsden County, Florida)
- Missouri Route 12B (former)
- Nebraska Spur 12B
- New York State Route 12B
  - County Route 12B (Cayuga County, New York)
- Secondary State Highway 12-B (Washington) (former)
