= List of A12 roads =

This is a list of roads designated A12. Entries are sorted in alphabetical order by country.

- A012 road (Argentina), a road around the city of Rosario
- A12 motorway (Austria), a road connecting Kufstein and the German Autobahn A 93 to Landeck
- A12 road (Belgium), a road from the border with the Netherlands near Zandvliet to Brussels via Antwerp
- A12 motorway (France), a road connecting Bailly and Bois-d'Arcy, Yvelines
- A 12 motorway (Germany), a road connecting Berlin and the Polish border
- A12 motorway (Italy), a road connecting Genoa and Rome
- A12 road (Latvia), a road connecting Jēkabpils and the Russian border
- A12 highway (Lithuania), a road connecting Ryga and Kaliningrad
- A12 road (Malaysia), a road in Perak connecting
- A12 motorway (Netherlands), a road connecting The Hague with the German border
- A12 road (People's Republic of China) may refer to:
  - A12 expressway (Shanghai), a road connecting Wenshui Road - Jiading and Taicang
- A12 motorway (Poland), former (1986–2000) designation of partially existing motorway A18
- A-12 motorway (Spain), a road connecting Pamplona and Burgos
- A 12 road (Sri Lanka), a road connecting Puttalam and Trincomalee
- A12 motorway (Switzerland), a road connecting Bern and Vevey
- A12 road (United Kingdom) may refer to:
  - A12 road (England), a road connecting London to Lowestoft, Suffolk
  - A12 road (Isle of Man), a road connecting Derbyhaven and Castletown
  - A12 road (Northern Ireland), a road connecting the M1 to the M2 and M3 motorways
- A12 road (United States of America) may refer to:
  - A12 road (California), a road connecting Old 99 Highway and US 97 near Weed

== See also ==
- list of highways numbered 12
