= Ignatovo, Ivanovo Oblast =

Ignatovo Игнатово
- Village
- Location within Ivanovo Oblast Location within Russia
- Coordinates: 56°57′N 40°57′E
- Country: Russia
- Region: Ivanovo Oblast
- District: Ivanovsky District
- Time zone: UTC+3:00

Ignatovo (Russian: Игнатово) is a rural locality (a village) in Ivanovsky District, Ivanovo Oblast, Russia. Population: 610 (2010 census);

== Geography ==
This rural locality is located 4 km from Ivanovo (the district's administrative centre and capital of Ivanovo Oblast) and 242 km from Moscow. Kolyanovo is the nearest rural locality.
