= Gorni Tsibar =

Gorni Tsibar Горни Цибър
- Village
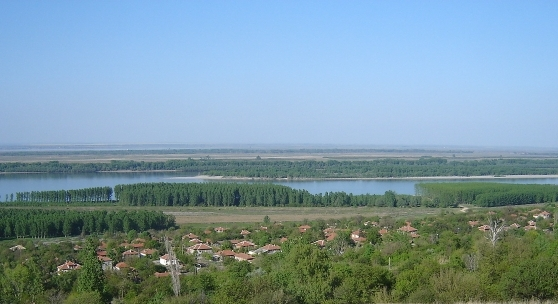
- Aerial view of the village

- Location within Bulgaria
- Coordinates: 43.8000°N 23.5333°E
- Country: Bulgaria
- Province: Montana Province
- Municipality: Valchedram
- Time zone: UTC+2 (EET)
  - Summer (DST): UTC+3 (EEST)

Gorni Tsibar is a village in Valchedram Municipality, Montana Province, northwestern Bulgaria.
