= Medkovets Municipality =

Medkovets Municipality Община Медковец
- Municipality
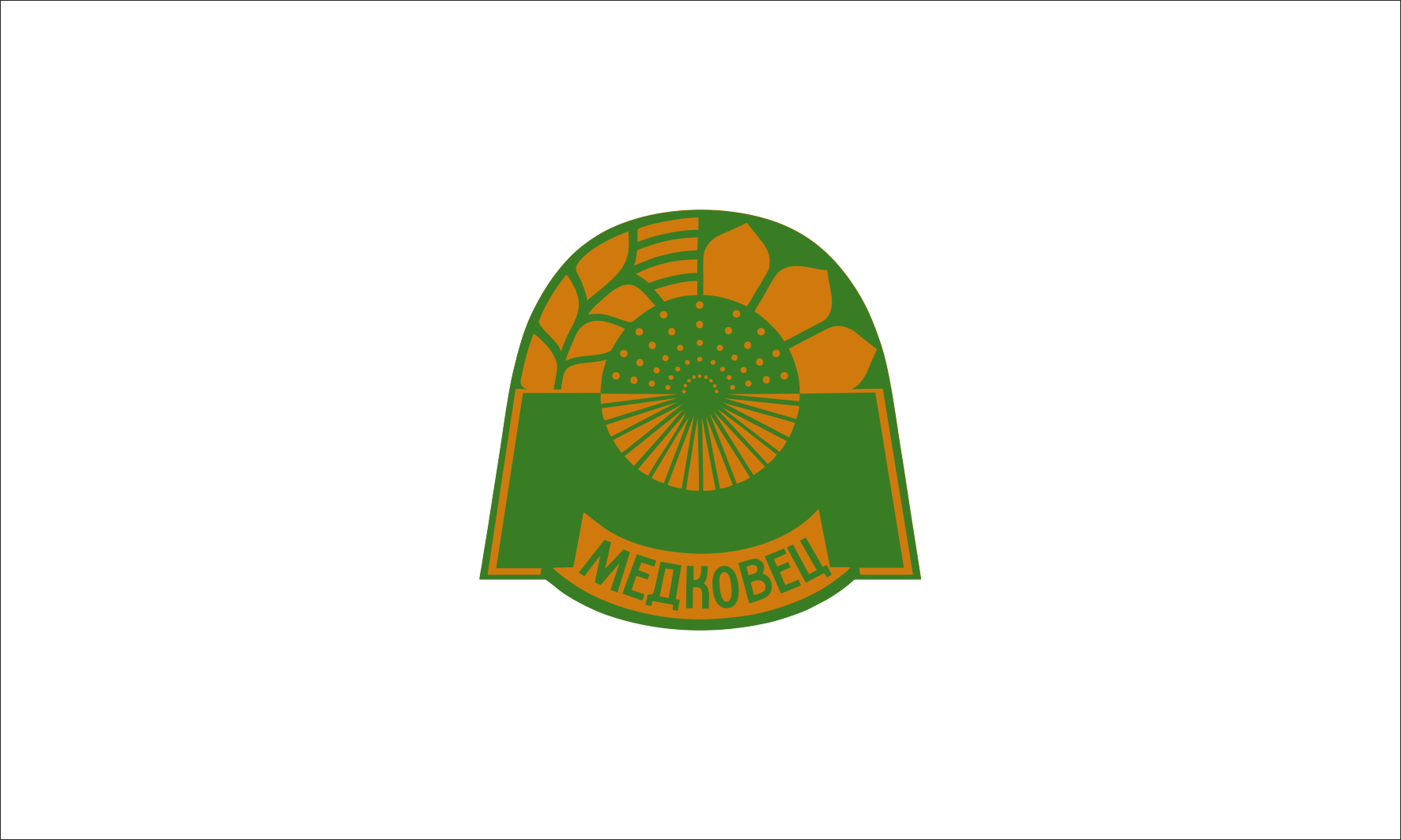
- Flag Coat of arms

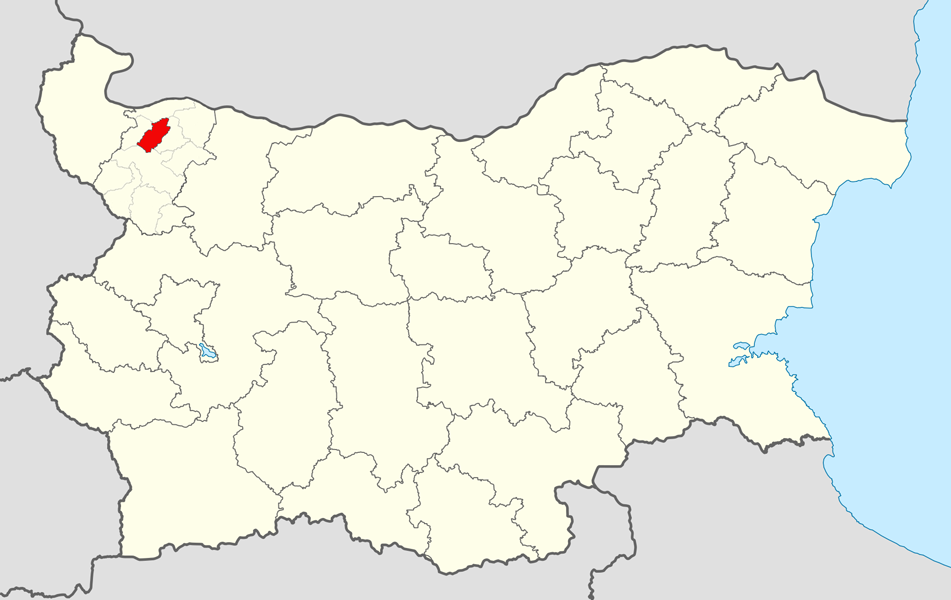
- Medkovets Municipality within Bulgaria and Montana Province.
- Coordinates: 43°37′N 23°10′E
- Country: Bulgaria
- Province (Oblast): Montana
- Admin. centre (Obshtinski tsentar): Medkovets

Area
  - Total: 188 km^{2} (73 sq mi)

Population (Census February 2011)
  - Total: 3,939
  - Density: 21.0/km^{2} (54.3/sq mi)
- Time zone: UTC+2 (EET)
  - Summer (DST): UTC+3 (EEST)

Medkovets Municipality (Bulgarian: Община Медковец) is a small municipality (obshtina) in Montana Province, Northwestern Bulgaria, located in the area of the Danubian Plain. It is named after its administrative centre - the village of Medkovets.

The municipality embraces a territory of 188 km^{2} (73 sq mi) with a population of 3,939 inhabitants, as of February 2011.

== Settlements ==
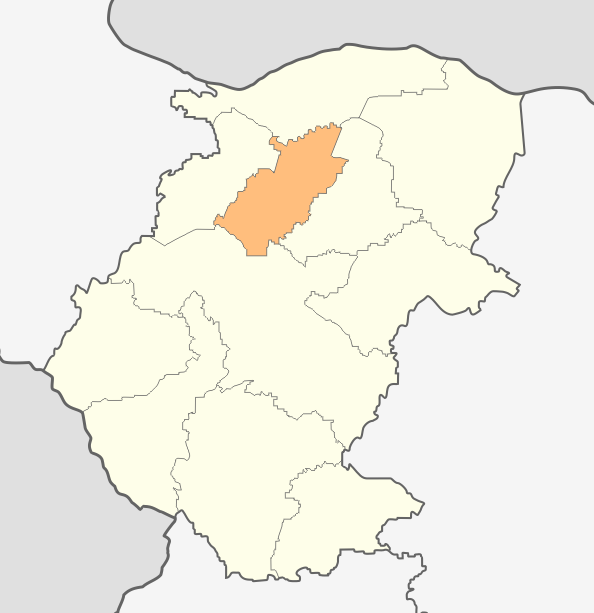
Medkovets Municipality within Montana Province

Medkovets Municipality includes the following 5 places all of them villages:

| Town/Village | Cyrillic | Population (December 2009) |
|---|---|---|
| Medkovets | Медковец | 1,850 |
| Asparuhovo | Аспарухово | 556 |
| Pishurka | Пишурка | 124 |
| Rasovo | Расово | 1,297 |
| Slivovik | Сливовик | 483 |
| Total | | 4,310 |

== Demography ==
The following table shows the change of the population during the last four decades.

Medkovets Municipality
| Year | 1975 | 1985 | 1992 | 2001 | 2005 | 2007 | 2009 | 2011 |
| Population | 9,463 | 7,640 | 6,849 | 5,661 | 4,856 | 4,571 | 4,310 | 3,939 |
Sources: Census 2001, Census 2011, „pop-stat.mashke.org“,

=== Religion ===
According to the latest Bulgarian census of 2011, the religious composition, among those who answered the optional question on religious identification, was the following:

Religious composition of Medkovets Municipality
| Orthodox Christianity | 73.9% |
| Catholicism | 0.2% |
| Protestantism | 0.4% |
| Islam | 0.0% |
| No religion | 16.4% |
| Prefer not to answer, others and indefinable | 9.1% |

== See also ==
- Provinces of Bulgaria
- Municipalities of Bulgaria
- List of cities and towns in Bulgaria
