= Ignatovo, Vytegorsky District, Vologda Oblast =

Ignatovo Игнатово
- Village
- Location within Vologda Oblast Location within Russia
- Coordinates: 60°47′N 37°45′E
- Country: Russia
- Region: Vologda Oblast
- District: Vytegorsky District
- Time zone: UTC+3:00

Ignatovo (Russian: Игнатово) is a rural locality (a village) in Kemskoye Rural Settlement, Vytegorsky District, Vologda Oblast, Russia. The population was 19 as of 2002.

== Geography ==
Ignatovo is located 92 km southeast of Vytegra (the district's administrative centre) by road. Artyunino is the nearest rural locality.
