= Asparuhovo, Montana Province =

Asparuhovo Аспарухово
- Location of Asparuhovo
- Coordinates: 43°42′10″N 23°12′52″E
- Country: Bulgaria
- Province (Oblast): Montana

Government
  - Mayor: Veselin Vasilev
- Elevation: 130 m (430 ft)

Population (2009-03-15)
  - Total: 540
- Time zone: UTC+2 (EET)
  - Summer (DST): UTC+3 (EEST)
- Postal Code: 3661
- Area code: 09719

Asparuhovo (Bulgarian: Аспарухово) is a village in Northwestern Bulgaria. It is located in Medkovets Municipality, Montana Province.

== See also ==
- List of villages in Montana Province
