= Ignatovo, Vladimir Oblast =

Ignatovo Игнатово
- Village
- Location within Vladimir Oblast Location within Russia
- Coordinates: 56°09′N 39°12′E
- Country: Russia
- Region: Vladimir Oblast
- District: Kirzhachsky District
- Time zone: UTC+3:00

Ignatovo (Russian: Игнатово) is a rural locality (a village) in Kiprevskoye Rural Settlement, Kirzhachsky District, Vladimir Oblast, Russia. The population was 4 as of 2010. There is 1 street.

== Geography ==
Ignatovo is located 30 km east of Kirzhach (the district's administrative centre) by road. Fetinovo is the nearest rural locality.
