= Razgrad (village) =

Coordinates: 43°45′N 023°30′E

Razgrad Разград
- Village
- Interactive map of Razgrad
- Country: Bulgaria
- Province: Montana Province
- Municipality: Valchedram
- Elevation: 100 m (330 ft)

Population (2015)
  - Total: 718
- Time zone: UTC+2 (EET)
  - Summer (DST): UTC+3 (EEST)

Razgrad is a village in Valchedram Municipality, Montana Province, northwestern Bulgaria.
