= List of highways numbered 12C =

The following highways are numbered 12C:

== United States ==
- Nebraska Spur 12C
- New York State Route 12C (former)
  - County Route 12C (Chenango County, New York)
- Secondary State Highway 12-C (Washington) (former)
