= Komoshtitsa =

Komoshtitsa Комощица
- Location of Komoshtitsa
- Coordinates: 43°43′01″N 23°18′52″E
- Country: Bulgaria
- Province (Oblast): Montana

Government
  - Mayor: Rosen Iliev
- Elevation: 127 m (417 ft)

Population (2009-03-15)
  - Total: 1,035
- Time zone: UTC+2 (EET)
  - Summer (DST): UTC+3 (EEST)
- Postal Code: 3648
- Area code: 09725

Komoshtitsa (Bulgarian: Комощица) is a village in Northwestern Bulgaria. It is located in Yakimovo Municipality, Montana Province. It is one of the poorest areas of the European Union.

== See also ==
- List of villages in Montana Province
