= Dalgodeltsi =

Dalgodeltsi Дългоделци
- Village
- Location of Dalgodeltsi
- Coordinates: 43°36′20″N 23°16′47″E
- Country: Bulgaria
- Province (Oblast): Montana
- Municipality: Yakimovo

Government
  - Mayor: Stanislav Ivanov
- Elevation: 116 m (381 ft)

Population (2009-03-15)
  - Total: 927
- Time zone: UTC+2 (EET)
  - Summer (DST): UTC+3 (EEST)
- Postal Code: 3638
- Area code: 09748

Dalgodeltsi (Bulgarian: Дългоделци, also transliterated as Dulgodeltsi, or Dŭlgodeltsi) is a village (село) in northwestern Bulgaria, located in the Yakimovo Municipality of the Montana Province.

== See also ==
- List of villages in Montana Province
