= Bazovets, Montana Province =

Bazovets Бъзовец
- Village
- Location within Bulgaria
- Coordinates: 43.6333°N 23.5500°E
- Country: Bulgaria
- Province: Montana Province
- Municipality: Valchedram
- Time zone: UTC+2 (EET)
  - Summer (DST): UTC+3 (EEST)

Bazovets is a village in Valchedram Municipality, Montana Province, northwestern Bulgaria.
