= II-12 road (Bulgaria) =

Road in Bulgaria

Republic Road I-12
- Републикански път I-12

Route information
- Length: 27.4 km (17.0 mi)

Major junctions
- From: Km 6 of I-1, Vidin
- To: Bregovo at the Bulgaria–Serbia border; Road 33 in Serbia

Location
- Country: Bulgaria
- Towns: Vidin, Bregovo

Highway system
- Highways in Bulgaria

Republican Road II-12 (Bulgarian: Републикански път II-12) is a short second-class road in the extreme north-west of Bulgaria, running entirely in Vidin Province. Its length is 27.4 km.

== Route description ==
The road starts at Km 6 of the first class I-1 road at the ring road of the city of Vidin northwest of the city center and runs in direction southeast–northwest throughout its entire route in the Danubian Plain. It passes through the village of Inovo, crosses the river Deleynska reka and following the western foothills of the Vinarovo Heights it reaches the village of Gamzovo. The road then crosses the Bregovo–Novo Selo Plain, runs through the town of Bregovo and reaches the Bulgaria–Serbia border at the river Timok, where it continues as Road 33 of the Serbian road network.
