= Cherni Vrah, Montana Province =

Coordinates: 43.6517°N 23.4131°E

Cherni Vrah Черни връх
- Village
- Interactive map of Cherni Vrah
- Country: Bulgaria
- Province: Montana Province
- Municipality: Valchedram
- Time zone: UTC+2 (EET)
  - Summer (DST): UTC+3 (EEST)

Cherni Vrah is a village in Valchedram Municipality, Montana Province, northwestern Bulgaria.
