= Yakimovo Municipality =

Yakimovo Municipality Община Якимово
- Municipality
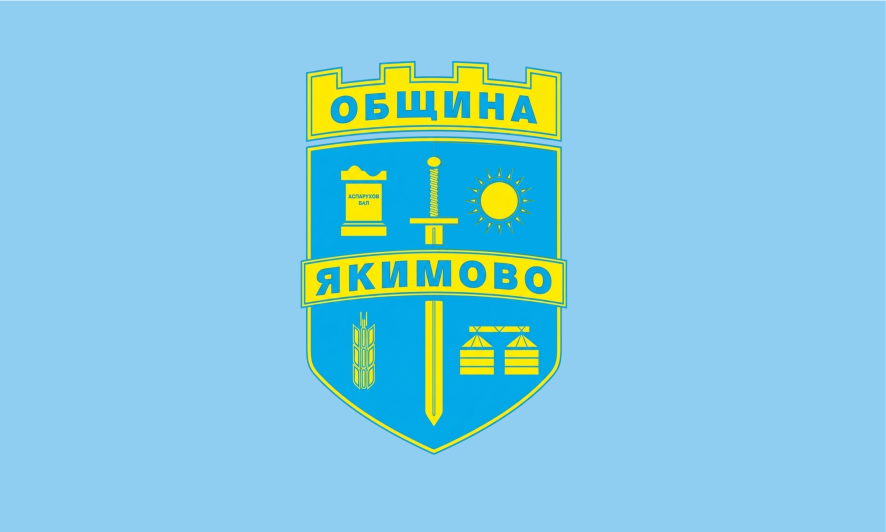
- Flag

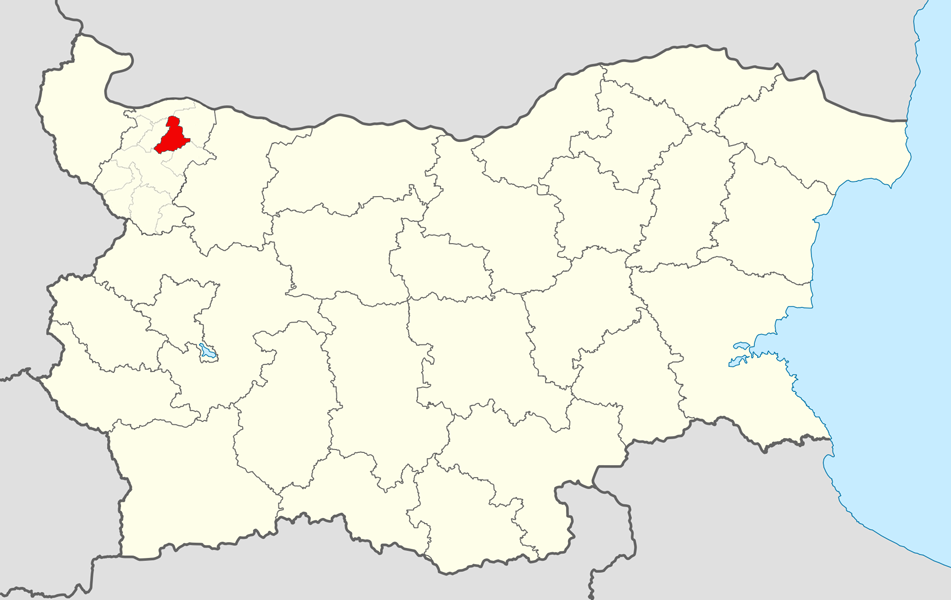
- Yakimovo Municipality within Bulgaria and Montana Province.
- Coordinates: 43°38′N 23°20′E
- Country: Bulgaria
- Province (Oblast): Montana
- Admin. centre (Obshtinski tsentar): Yakimovo

Area
  - Total: 221.96 km^{2} (85.70 sq mi)

Population (Census February 2011)
  - Total: 4,252
  - Density: 19.16/km^{2} (49.62/sq mi)
- Time zone: UTC+2 (EET)
  - Summer (DST): UTC+3 (EEST)

Yakimovo Municipality (Bulgarian: Община Якимово) is a small municipality (obshtina) in Montana Province, Northwestern Bulgaria, located in the area of the Danubian Plain. It is named after its administrative centre - the village of Yakimovo.

The municipality embraces a territory of 221.96 km^{2} (85.70 sq mi) with a population of 4,252 inhabitants, as of February 2011.

== Settlements ==
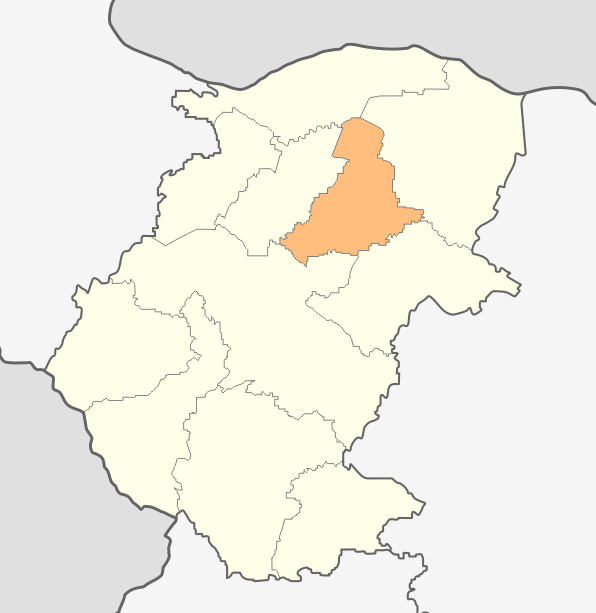
Yakimovo Municipality within Montana Province

Yakimovo Municipality includes the following 4 places all of them villages:

Town/Village	Cyrillic	Population (December 2009)
Yakimovo	Якимово	1,698
Dalgodeltsi	Дългоделци	931
Dolno Tserovene	Долно Церовене	854
Komoshtitsa	Комощица	1,052
Total		4,535

== Demography ==
The following table shows the change of the population during the last four decades.

Yakimovo Municipality
Year	1975	1985	1992	2001	2005	2007	2009	2011
Population	10,552	8,030	7,099	5,885	5,105	4,793	4,535	4,252
Sources: Census 2001, Census 2011, „pop-stat.mashke.org“,

=== Religion ===
According to the latest Bulgarian census of 2011, the religious composition, among those who answered the optional question on religious identification, was the following:

Religious composition of Yakimovo Municipality
Orthodox Christianity	84.4%
Catholicism	0.3%
Protestantism	1.1%
Islam	0.0%
No religion	6.7%
Prefer not to answer, others and indefinable	7.5%

== See also ==
- Provinces of Bulgaria
- Municipalities of Bulgaria
- List of cities and towns in Bulgaria
