= Botevo, Montana Province =

Botevo, Montana Province Ботево
- Location of Botevo
- Coordinates: 43°45′0″N 23°27′56″E
- Country: Bulgaria
- Provinces (Oblast): Montana

Government
  - Mayor: Ivan Barzin

Population (2015)
  - Total: 62
- Time zone: UTC+2 (EET)
  - Summer (DST): UTC+3 (EEST)
- Postal Code: 3634
- Area code: 09746
- License plate: B

Botevo (Bulgarian: Ботево) is a village in Valchedram Municipality, Northwestern Bulgaria.
