= Valchedram Municipality =

Valchedram Municipality Община Вълчедръм
- Municipality
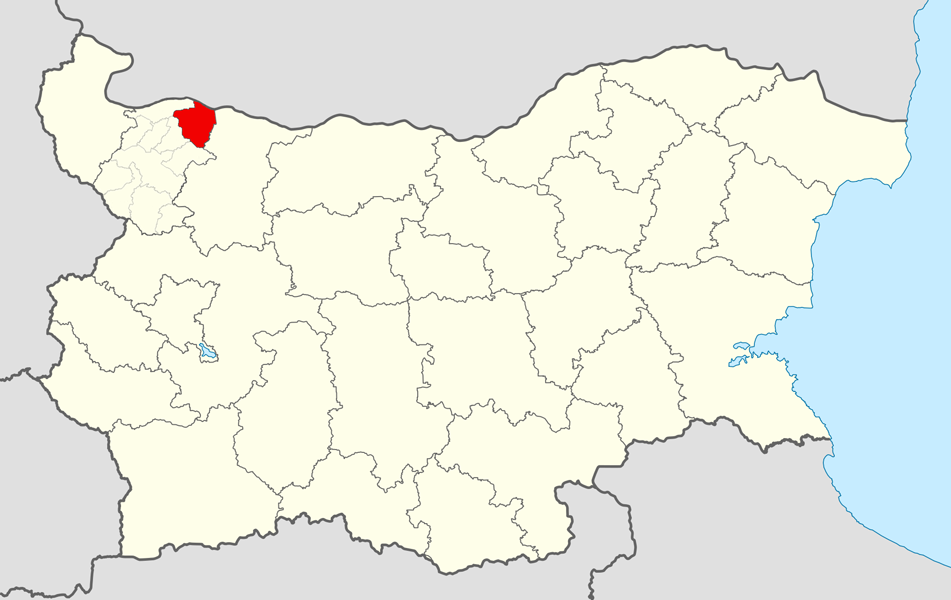
- Valchedram Municipality within Bulgaria and Montana Province.
- Coordinates: 43°43′N 23°30′E
- Country: Bulgaria
- Province (Oblast): Vidin
- Admin. centre (Obshtinski tsentar): Valchedram

Area
  - Total: 429 km^{2} (166 sq mi)

Population (Census February 2011)
  - Total: 9,771
  - Density: 22.8/km^{2} (59.0/sq mi)
- Time zone: UTC+2 (EET)
  - Summer (DST): UTC+3 (EEST)

Valchedram Municipality (Bulgarian: Община Вълчедръм) is a frontier municipality (obshtina) in Montana Province, Northwestern Bulgaria, located along the right bank of Danube river in the Danubian Plain. It is named after its administrative centre - the town of Valchedram. The area borders on Romania beyond the Danube to the north.

The municipality embraces a territory of 429 km^{2} (166 sq mi) with a population of 9,771 inhabitants, as of February 2011.

== Settlements ==
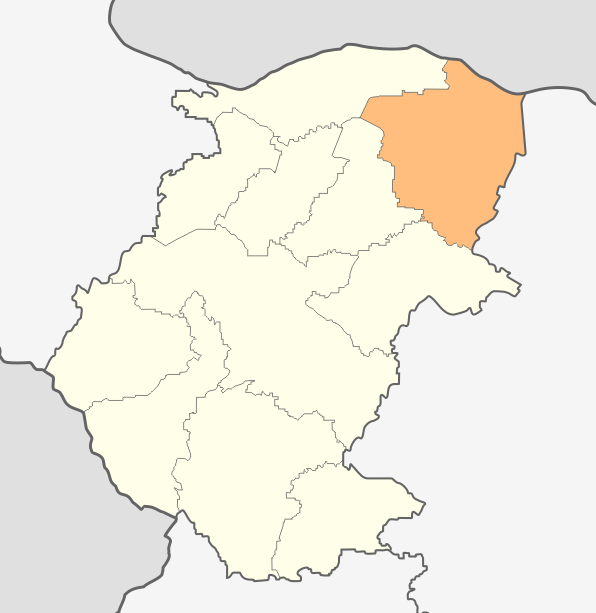
Valchedram Municipality within Montana Province

Valchedram Municipality includes the following 11 places (towns are shown in bold):

Town/Village	Cyrillic	Population (December 2009)
**Valchedram**	**Вълчедръм**	3,817
Botevo	Ботево	77
Bazovets	Бъзовец	161
Cherni Vrah	Черни връх	534
Dolni Tsibar	Долни Цибър	1,544
Gorni Tsibar	Горни Цибър	205
Ignatovo	Игнатово	295
Mokresh	Мокреш	889
Razgrad	Разград	839
Septemvriytsi	Септемврийци	1,151
Zlatia	Златия	886
Total		10,398

== Demography ==
The following table shows the change of the population during the last four decades. Since 1992 Valchedram Municipality has comprised the former municipality of Zlatiya and the numbers in the table reflect this unification.

Valchedram Municipality
**Year**	1975	1985	1992	**2001**	2005	2007	2009	**2011**
**Population**	13,538	11,394	15,852	13,146	11,645	10,986	10,398	9,771
Sources: Census 2001, Census 2011, „pop-stat.mashke.org“,

=== Religion ===
According to the latest Bulgarian census of 2011, the religious composition, among those who answered the optional question on religious identification, was the following:

Religious composition of Valchedram Municipality
Orthodox Christianity	67.0%
Catholicism	0.4%
Protestantism	0.4%
Islam	0.0%
No religion	13.3%
Prefer not to answer, others and indefinable	18.9%

== See also ==
- Provinces of Bulgaria
- Municipalities of Bulgaria
- List of cities and towns in Bulgaria
