= Dolni Tsibar =

Dolni Tsibar Долни Цибър
- Village
- Location within Bulgaria
- Coordinates: 43.8167°N 23.5167°E
- Country: Bulgaria
- Province: Montana Province
- Municipality: Valchedram

Population (February 2011)
  - Total: ▲1,586
- Time zone: UTC+2 (EET)
  - Summer (DST): UTC+3 (EEST)

Dolni Tsibar is a village in Valchedram Municipality, Montana Province, northwestern Bulgaria.

It is the site of the Roman fort of Cebrus on the Danubian Limes frontier system along the Danube.

Most people are Romani and belong to the Bulgarian Orthodox Church. The village Dolni Tsibar is one of the few places with a constant population increase over the years, mainly due to its high birth rate. Dolni Tsibar has a median age of 30 years old: children under 15 years old constitute around 25% of the population, while elderly (65+) constitute less than 7%.
