= Pishurka =

Pishurka Пишурка
- Location of Pishurka
- Coordinates: 43°39′06″N 23°15′17″E
- Country: Bulgaria
- Province (Oblast): Montana

Government
  - Mayor: Ventsislav Kutkudeyski
- Elevation: 144 m (472 ft)

Population (2009-03-15)
  - Total: 121
- Time zone: UTC+2 (EET)
  - Summer (DST): UTC+3 (EEST)
- Postal Code: 3662
- Area code: 09729

Pishurka (Bulgarian: Пишурка) is a village in Northwestern Bulgaria with a total population of 121(2009 census).It is located in Medkovets Municipality, Montana Province.

== See also ==
- List of villages in Montana Province
