= Ignatovo, Bulgaria =

Ignatovo Игнатово
- Village
- Location within Bulgaria
- Coordinates: 43.7833°N 23.4833°E
- Country: Bulgaria
- Province: Montana Province
- Municipality: Valchedram
- Time zone: UTC+2 (EET)
  - Summer (DST): UTC+3 (EEST)

Ignatovo is a village in Valchedram Municipality, Montana Province, northwestern Bulgaria.
