= Dolno Tserovene =

Dolno Tserovene Долно Церовене
- Location of Dolno Tserovene
- Coordinates: 43°35′24″N 23°14′43″E
- Country: Bulgaria
- Province (Oblast): Montana

Government
  - Mayor: Stanislav Ivanov
- Elevation: 139 m (456 ft)

Population (2009-03-15)
  - Total: 858
- Time zone: UTC+2 (EET)
  - Summer (DST): UTC+3 (EEST)
- Postal Code: 3639
- Area code: 09721

Dolno Tserovene (Bulgarian: Долно Церовене) is a village in Northwestern Bulgaria. It is located in Yakimovo Municipality, Montana Province.

== See also ==
- List of villages in Montana Province
