= Mokresh, Montana Province =

Mokresh Мокреш
- Village
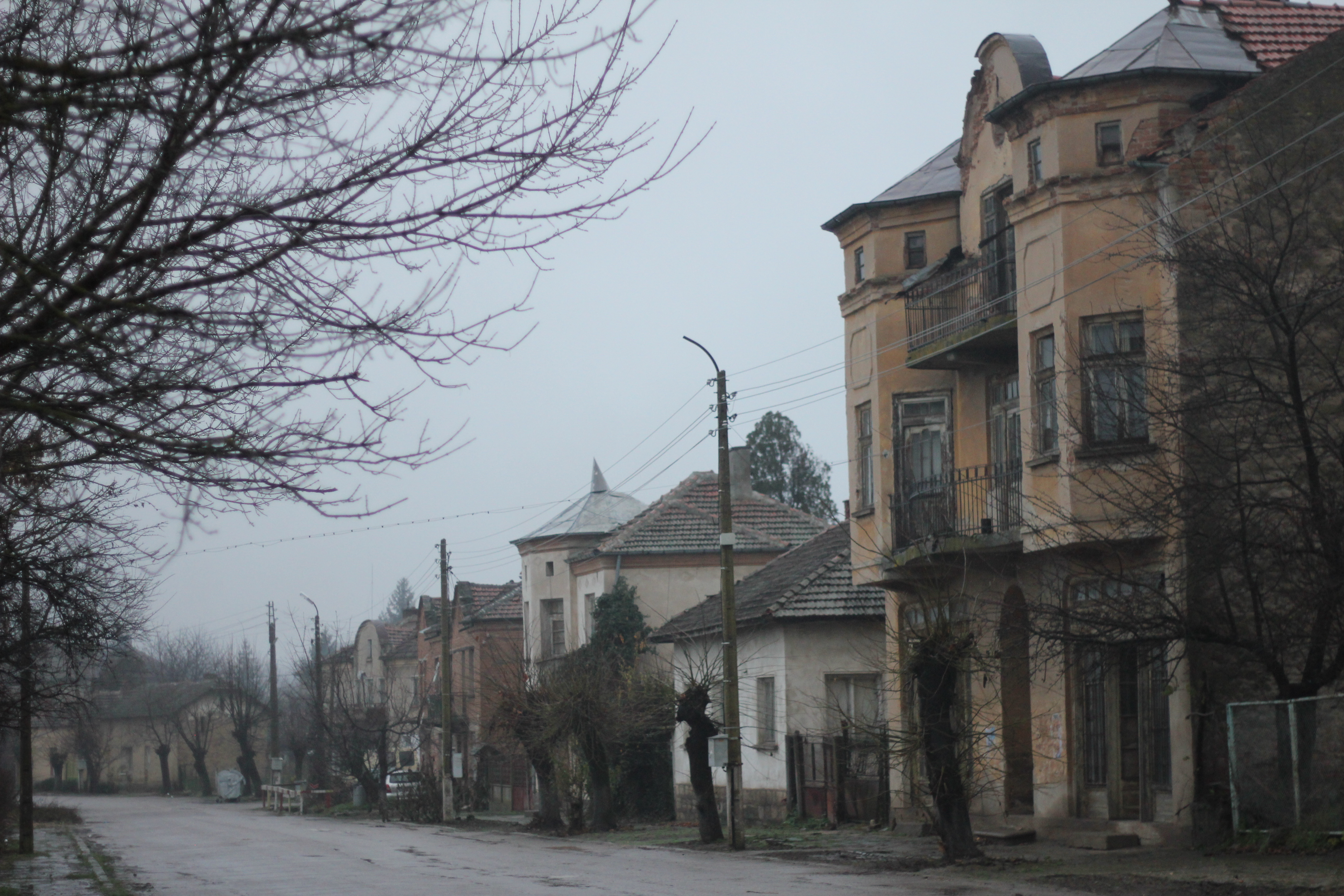
- Mokresh main street

- Location of Mokresh
- Coordinates: 43°45′01″N 23°23′49″E
- Country: Bulgaria
- Province (Oblast): Montana
- Municipality: Valchedram

Government
  - Mayor: Ognian Efremov

Area
  - Total: 66.7 km^{2} (25.8 sq mi)
- Elevation: 77 m (253 ft)

Population (2009-03-15)
  - Total: 866
  - Density: 13.0/km^{2} (33.6/sq mi)
- Time zone: UTC+2 (EET)
  - Summer (DST): UTC+3 (EEST)
- Postal Code: 3647
- Area code: 09747
- License Plate: M

Mokresh (Bulgarian: Мокреш) is a village in northwestern Bulgaria, located in the Valchedram Municipality of the Montana Province.

The village is situated in a small valley, 7 kilometres (4.3 mi) from Valchedram, 19 kilometres (12 mi) from Lom, and 50 kilometres (31 mi) from Montana.

== Roman Empire ==
The hills of Mokresh, from where the fertile plains start, have been once inhabited by the Thracian Moesi and by the Romans. There are still traces from a Roman residence in the park “Žir”, as well as an old Roman cemetery nearby. The most famous artifact (nowadays in Sofia Archeological Museum) is the marble gravestone of a Roman soldier. But excavations and research have not been carried out so far. Only the treasure-hunters know what the ancient sites contain.

== Small Paris ==
Once upon a time, people used to call Mokresh a European village—because many of the natives studied in the cities and abroad, and there were many fashionably clothed men and women. The young village residents used to regularly go to the port in Lom to watch the passengers on the steamboats from Europe. They imitated the design of the clothes and the manner of speaking. The more affluent landowners from Mokresh started building their houses in a European style of architecture. That’s why, the locals named Mokresh the “Small Paris”. That was in the first half of the 20th century.

== Pop Puncho ==
The most famous citizen is Pope Puncho. He made one of the first copies of the Old Bulgarian History by Paisius of Hilendar in the 19th century. Mokresh has its place in the National Revival history mainly through the activity of Pop Puncho Kuzdin, a remarkable person for his time. Born in the village, the priest made one of the first copies of the “Istoria slaviyanobulgarska” by Paisii Hilendarski. This copy was later included in the Bulgarian homilies from 1796. There are stories about Saint John of Rila, parables about Adam and Eve, the Birth of Christ, a short novel about the Russian tsar Peter the Great, all narrated simply and with love for Bulgaria. In his book he painted images of the Virgin and the Saints, as well a self-portrait. In the day, Puncho the priest taught the Mokresh children in the monastery school founded by him, and at night he was writing his homilies. Nowadays, this collection of 400 pages is preserved in the National library of Sofia. The digital edition of this book has been included in the European digital library.

== See also ==
- List of villages in Montana Province
