= Zlatia, Montana Province =

Zlatia Златия
- Village
- Location within Bulgaria
- Coordinates: 43.7792°N 23.5028°E
- Country: Bulgaria
- Province: Montana Province
- Municipality: Valchedram
- Time zone: UTC+2 (EET)
  - Summer (DST): UTC+3 (EEST)

Zlatia is a village in Valchedram Municipality, Montana Province, northwestern Bulgaria.

== Honours ==
Zlatiya Glacier on Brabant Island, Antarctica is named after the village.
