= Rasovo, Montana Province =

Rasovo Расово
- Location of Rasovo
- Coordinates: 43°42′N 23°14′E
- Country: Bulgaria
- Province (Oblast): Montana

Government
  - Mayor: Stefan Kopashev
- Elevation: 133 m (436 ft)

Population (2011)
  - Total: 1,105
- Time zone: UTC+2 (EET)
  - Summer (DST): UTC+3 (EEST)
- Postal Code: 3660
- Area code: 09729

Rasovo (Bulgarian: Расово) is a village in Northwestern Bulgaria. It is located in Medkovets Municipality, Montana Province.

== See also ==
- List of villages in Montana Province
