= Stakevska reka =

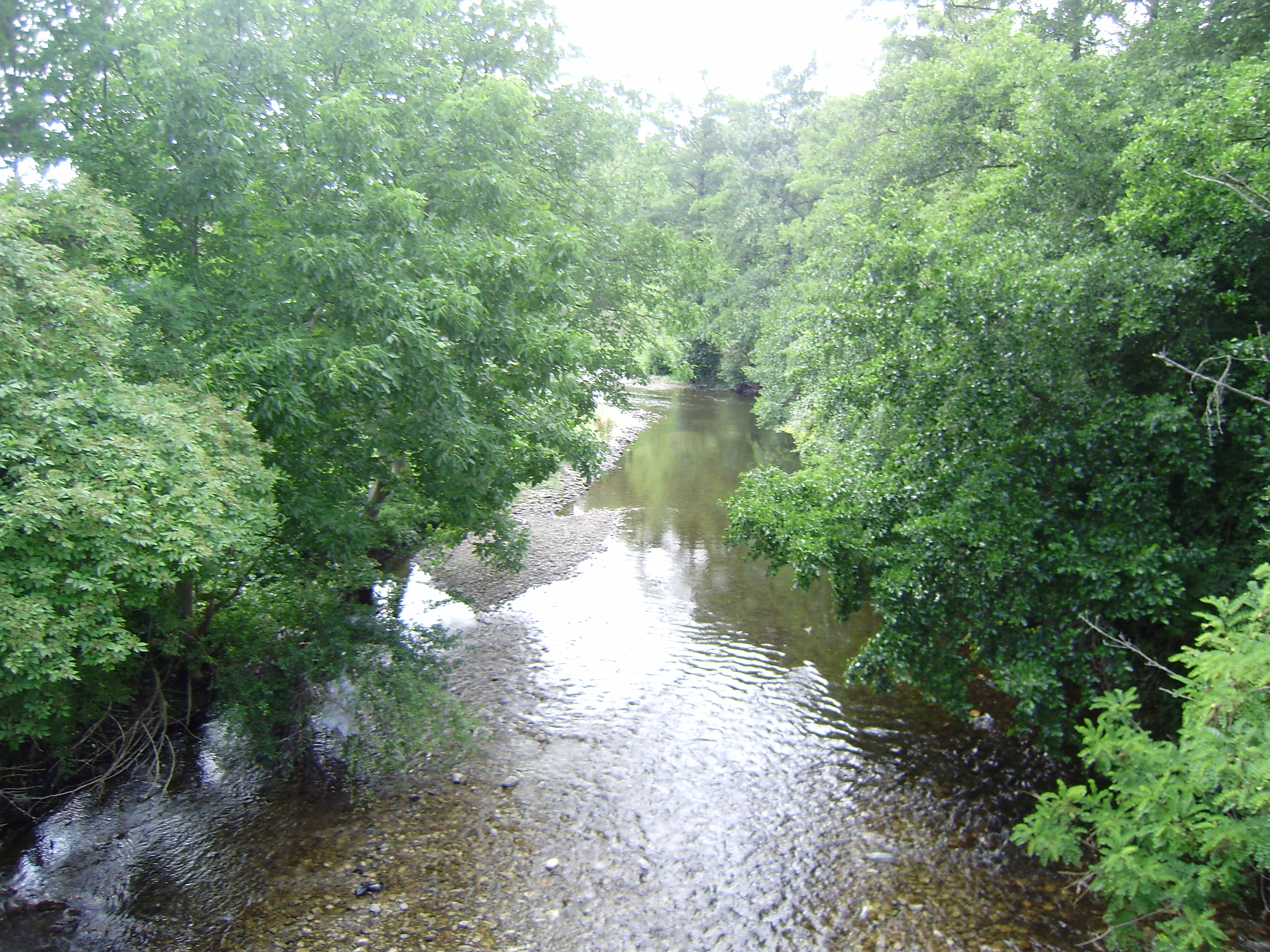

Location
- Country: Bulgaria

Physical characteristics
- Source
  - location: Balkan Mountains
  - coordinates: 43°28′15.96″N 22°34′9.12″E
  - elevation: 1,300 m (4,300 ft)
- Mouth
  - location: Lom
  - coordinates: 43°35′26.16″N 22°46′48″E
  - elevation: 218 m (715 ft)
- Length: 34 km (21 mi)
- Basin size: 328 km^{2} (127 sq mi)

Basin features
- Progression: Lom→ Danube

The Stakevska reka (Bulgarian: Стакевска река) is a river in northwestern Bulgaria, a left tributary of the Lom, itself a right tributary of the Danube. Its length is 34 km.

== Geography ==
The river takes its source under the name Zheleznata reka at an altitude of 1,300 m about a kilometer northwest of the summit of Haydushki Kamak (1,721 m), the highest peak in the Sveti Nikola section of the northwestern part of the Balkan Mountains. It flows north in a deep forested valley until the village of Stakevtsi and after the junction of the road to the village of Krachimir, the river turns east and crosses the Vedernik ridge. After the junction to Belogradchik, it turns southeast and then east, flowing in a wide valley. Some 1.2 km before its mouth it is joined by its largest tributary, the Chuprenska reka. The river flows into the Lom at an altitude of 218 m at the village of Yanyovets.

Its drainage basin covers a territory of 328 km^{2}, or 26.5% of the Lom's total. The river has predominantly snow–rain feed. The average annual discharge at the village of Borovitsa is 2 m^{3}/s.

== Settlements and tourism ==
The Stakevska reka flows entirely in Vidin Province. There are three villages along its course, Stakevtsi, Chiflik and Borovitsa, all of them in Belogradchik Municipality. For 10.2 km upstream from its mouth, its left bank is followed by a stretch of the third class III-102 road Dimovo–Belogradchik–Montana. Just north of the river at Chiflik span the Belogradchik Rocks, a system of sandstone and conglomerate rock formations, a major tourist attraction and a contender in the New 7 Wonders of the World campaign of 2007. A waterfall along the Stakevska reka at the Belata Voda locality has been declared a natural landmark in 1976.
