= Aleksandar Lilov =

Bulgarian politician and philosopher (1933–2013)

Aleksandar Lilov Александър Лилов
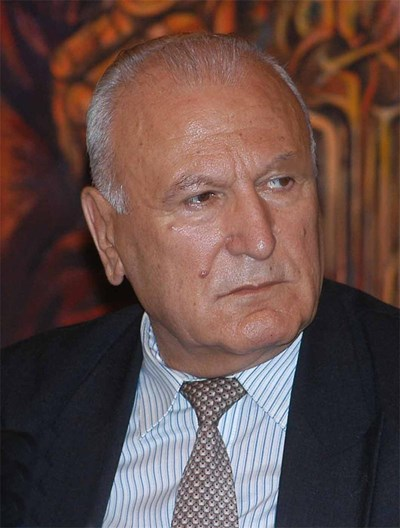

Chairman of the Bulgarian Socialist Party
- In office 3 April 1990 – 17 December 1991
- Preceded by: Himself as Chairman of the BCP
- Succeeded by: Zhan Videnov

Chairman of the Bulgarian Communist Party
- In office 2 February 1990 – 3 April 1990
- Preceded by: Petar Mladenov (as General Secretary)
- Succeeded by: Himself as Chairman of the BSP

Personal details
- Born: Aleksandar Vasilev Lilov; Александър Василев Лилов; 31 August 1933 Granichak, Kingdom of Bulgaria
- Died: 20 July 2013 (aged 79) Sofia, Bulgaria
- Party: Bulgarian Socialist Party (1990–2013)
- Other political affiliations: Bulgarian Communist Party (until 1990)
- Education: Sofia University (Philosophy)

Aleksandar Vasilev Lilov (Bulgarian: Александър Василев Лилов; 31 August 1933 – 20 July 2013) was a Bulgarian politician and philosopher. At his career's height during the People's Republic of Bulgaria, he was described as the second most powerful man of the regime; however, he fell out of favor in 1983 and lost his power. He made a strong political comeback during the democratic transition and was elected chairman of the Bulgarian Communist Party. He led the party to transform and adapt to the post-Communist era. A party referendum supported his proposal to change the name to the Bulgarian Socialist Party.

After winning the 1990 Bulgarian Constitutional Assembly election, he did not become prime minister himself, and he eventually supported a multi-party government led by Dimitar Iliev Popov. After losing the 1991 parliamentary elections he stepped down as party leader. In 2001, he retired as MP after having served for 39 years.

== Biography ==
Aleksandar Lilov was born on 31 August 1933 in the village of Granichak, northwestern Vidin Province. He graduated Bulgarian Studies (philosophy) at Sofia University in 1962 and graduated doctoral studies in communist Social Science at the Academy of Public Sciences in Moscow. In 1975 he became an associate at the institution of art at the Bulgarian Academy of Sciences. Six years later, he defended a doctoral thesis in 1981. He died on 20 July 2013 at the age of 79.

== Political career ==
Lilov joined the Dimitrov Young Communist League in Vidin and rose to the ranks of its central committee in 1963. Six years later he joined the central Party organ and in 1971 he became a prominent member of the Communist Party. Lilov was a member of the Politburo of the Central Committee of the Bulgarian Communist Party from July 1974 to September 1983 and was also a secretary of the Central Committee of the Party from July 1972 to September 28, 1983. He was also a member of the State Council of Bulgaria from 1976 to 1983. By the end of the 1970s he was viewed as the second most powerful member of the party. After the death of Lyudmila Zhivkova (General Secretary Todor Zhivkov's daughter) in 1981, Lilov's power began to wane. In 1983 he was removed from the Politburo after criticizing the General Secretary for his economic mismanagement and apparent lack of interest in current issues.

After fading from the public view for six years, Lilov returned from Great-Britain - where he was when Zhivkov was forced to resign on November 10, 1989 - and was welcomed back among the leaders of the BCP. There he denounced the Revival Process (started by Zhivkov and internationally condemned) and allowed Bulgarian Muslims to reinstate their former names.

During the 14th emergency congress of the Bulgarian Communist Party (held in January - February 1990), the post of general secretary was abolished, and Lilov was elected to the new post of chairman. Under his leadership the party was dissolved and reorganized into the Bulgarian Socialist Party on April 3 following a party referendum. This transition brought about revolutionary change to the party's ideology from Marxism–Leninism to democratic socialism. Change was also brought to the way the party was run in order to dismantle the one-party apparatus in the country towards a multi-party system like in the former Western Bloc's liberal democracy. In September, he was reelected as party chairman by a margin of 2 to 1 against the hopes of the liberals in the party who sought to remove the remains of the former Communist regime. He remained the party's leader until the end of 1991.

He led the Socialists through the first democratic elections in 1990, elected to adopt a new constitution, where his party won a majority of the seats (211 out of 400) and 47.15% of the votes. He did not become Prime Minister himself, instead continuing his support for the socialist government in place led by Andrey Lukanov. This came to an end when mass demonstrations and a general strike led to the formation of a government under the non-partisan judge Dimitar Popov in which the BSP participated alongside the UDF, BANU and independent experts.

His second election campaign in 1991 ended with defeat after his electoral alliance won only 33.1% of the votes and 106 seats (out of 240); finishing behind the Union of Democratic Forces who won 34.4% of the votes and 110 seats. Later that year he stepped down and as chairman of the party and was succeeded by Zhan Videnov. Lilov remained a Member of Parliament until 2001, a seat he held for 39 years (1962–2001). In 2001 he was the longest serving member of parliament.
