= Chuprenska reka =

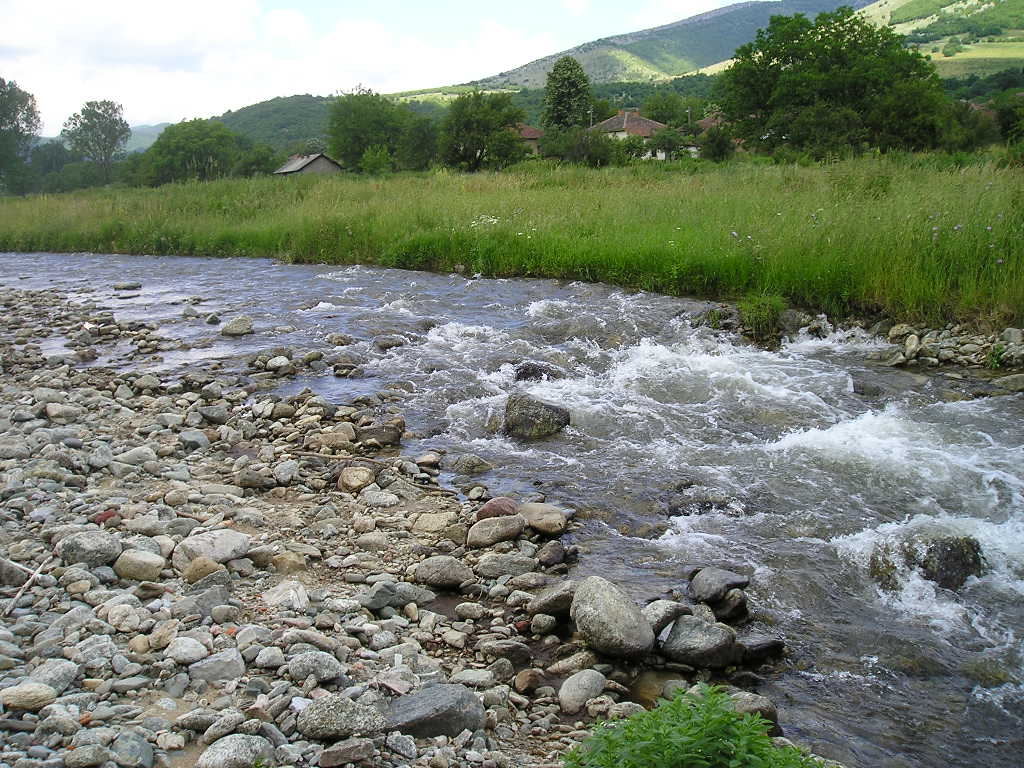

Location
- Country: Bulgaria

Physical characteristics
- Source
  - location: Balkan Mountains
  - coordinates: 43°26′3.84″N 22°37′31.08″E
  - elevation: 1,480 m (4,860 ft)
- Mouth
  - location: Stakevska reka
  - coordinates: 43°35′11.04″N 22°46′5.88″E
  - elevation: 230 m (750 ft)
- Length: 27 km (17 mi)
- Basin size: 120 km^{2} (46 sq mi)

Basin features
- Progression: Stakevska reka→ Lom→ Danube

The Chuprenska reka (Bulgarian: Чупренска река) is a river in northwestern Bulgaria, a right tributary of the Stakevska reka, itself a left tributary of the Lom of the Danube drainage. Its length is 27 km.

The river takes its source under the name Golema reka at an altitude of 1,480 m north of the summit of Ostra Chuka in the Chiprovska Planina section of the northwestern part of the Balkan Mountains. It flows in general direction northeast. Its valley is deep and forested until the village of Chuprene. After the village of Targovishte, the river crosses the Vedernik ridge. It flows into the Stakevska reka at an altitude of 230 m some 1.2 km from the latter's confluence with the Lom.

Its drainage basin covers a territory of 120 km^{2}, or 36.6% of the Lom's total. The river has predominantly rain feed with high water in April and low water in July–August. It almost dries out in summer and in spring the river may overflow during intense rains and snowmelt.

The Chuprenska reka flows entirely in Vidin Province. There are three villages along its course, Chuprene, Targovishte and Protopopintsi, all of them in Chuprene Municipality. A 21.7 km stretch of the third class III-114 road Lom–Ruzhintsi–Sveti Nikola Pass follows most of its valley. Its waters are utilised for irrigation in the lower course. Its upper course falls within the boundaries of the Chuprene Reserve.
