= Granitovo, Vidin Province =

Granitovo Гранитово
- Village
- Location within Bulgaria
- Coordinates: 43°40′42″N 22°41′29″E
- Country: Bulgaria
- Province: Vidin Province
- Municipality: Belogradchik

Government
  - Mayor: Boris Nikolov

Area
  - Total: 22.82 km^{2} (8.81 sq mi)

Population (31-12-2013)
  - Total: 53
- Bulgaria Guide
- Time zone: UTC+2 (EET)
  - Summer (DST): UTC+3 (EEST)
- Postal Code: 3914

Granitovo (Bulgarian: Гранитово) is a village in Vidin Province in northwestern Bulgaria. It is located in the municipality of Belogradchik.

Its population in 2010 was 61.

== Points of interest ==
- Tsankino Vrelo cave

== Sources ==
- Michev Nicholas & Peter Koledarov. "Dictionary of settlements and settlement names in Bulgaria 1878-1987", Sofia, 1989.
