= Granichak (village) =

Granichak Граничак
- Village
- Location within Bulgaria
- Coordinates: 43°38′34″N 22°35′16″E
- Country: Bulgaria
- Province: Vidin Province
- Municipality: Belogradchik

Government
  - Mayor: Boris Nikolov

Area
  - Total: 9.426 km^{2} (3.639 sq mi)

Population (31-12-2013)
  - Total: 10
- Bulgaria Guide
- Time zone: UTC+2 (EET)
  - Summer (DST): UTC+3 (EEST)

Granichak (Bulgarian: Граничак) is a village in Vidin Province in northwestern Bulgaria. It is located in the municipality of Belogradchik.

== Points of interest ==
- Anishte, a Roman road station, is located two kilometers east of Granichak. It dates back to the 2nd and 3rd century. Eighty hectares have been protected around it. Lamps, ceramics, belt buckles and coins have been found there.
- Vedernik, a mountain of 1,125 meters in elevation.

== Sources ==
- Michev Nicholas & Peter Koledarov. "Dictionary of settlements and settlement names in Bulgaria 1878-1987", Sofia, 1989.
