= Dabravka =

Dabravka Дъбравка
- Village
- Location within Bulgaria
- Coordinates: 43°38′15″N 22°37′20″E
- Country: Bulgaria
- Province: Vidin Province
- Municipality: Belogradchik

Government
  - Mayor: Boris Nikolov

Area
  - Total: 16.92 km^{2} (6.53 sq mi)

Population (31-12-2013)
  - Total: 50
- Bulgaria Guide
- Time zone: UTC+2 (EET)
  - Summer (DST): UTC+3 (EEST)
- Postal Code: 3916

Dabravka (Bulgarian: Дъбравка [dɐˈbrafkɐ]) is a village in Vidin Province in northwestern Bulgaria. It is located in the municipality of Belogradchik. In the local dialect it is pronounced "Dabrava".

== Sources ==
- Michev Nicholas & Peter Koledarov. "Dictionary of settlements and settlement names in Bulgaria 1878-1987", Sofia, 1989.
