= Belogradchik Municipality =

Belogradchik Municipality Община Белоградчик
- Municipality
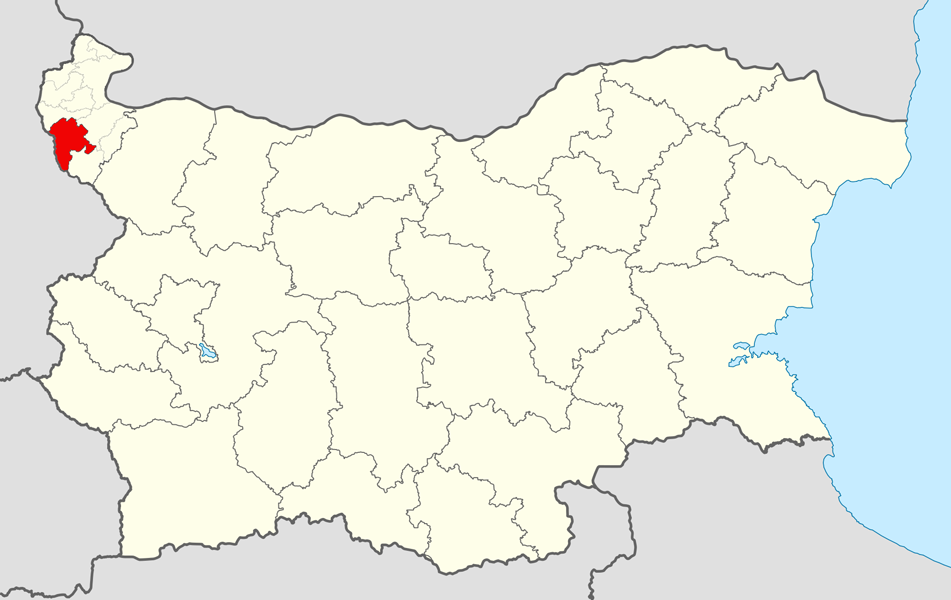
- Belogradchik Municipality within Bulgaria and Vidin Province.
- Coordinates: 43°39′N 22°35′E
- Country: Bulgaria
- Province (Oblast): Vidin
- Admin. centre (Obshtinski tsentar): Belogradchik

Area
  - Total: 411 km^{2} (159 sq mi)

Population (December 2009)
  - Total: 7,045
  - Density: 17.1/km^{2} (44.4/sq mi)
- Time zone: UTC+2 (EET)
  - Summer (DST): UTC+3 (EEST)

Belogradchik Municipality (Bulgarian: Община Белоградчик) is a municipality (obshtina) in Vidin Province, Northwestern Bulgaria, located in the western parts of the so-called Fore-Balkan area. It is named after its administrative centre - the town of Belogradchik. To the west and southwest, the municipality borders on Republic of Serbia.

The area embraces a territory of 411 km^{2} (159 sq mi) with a population of 7,045 inhabitants, as of December 2009.

The municipality is best known with the Belogradchik Rocks, impressive rock formations located just south of the main town as well as the medieval Belogradchik Fortress situated in the same rocky area. Another place of interest is the Magura Cave, with its beautiful prehistoric cave paintings.

== Settlements ==
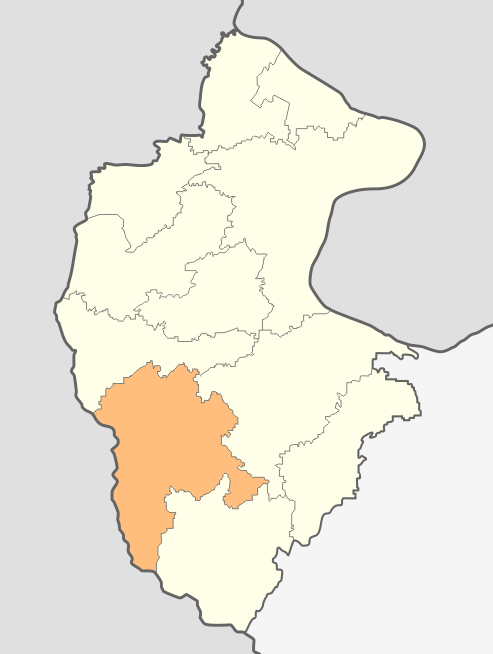
Belogradchik Municipality within Vidin Province

Belogradchik Municipality includes the following 18 places (towns are shown in bold):

Town/Village	Cyrillic	Population (December 2009)
**Belogradchik**	**Белоградчик**	5,334
Borovitsa	Боровица	195
Chiflik	Чифлик	128
Dabravka	Дъбравка	77
Granitovo	Гранитово	66
Granichak	Граничак	19
Krachimir	Крачимир	26
Oshane	Ошане	71
Prauzhda	Праужда	74
Prolaznitsa	Пролазница	18
Rabisha	Рабиша	312
Rayanovtsi	Раяновци	144
Salash	Салаш	217
Slivovnik	Сливовник	26
Stakevtsi	Стакевци	233
Struindol	Струиндол	23
Veshtitsa	Вещица	53
Varba	Върба	29
Total		7,045

== Demography ==
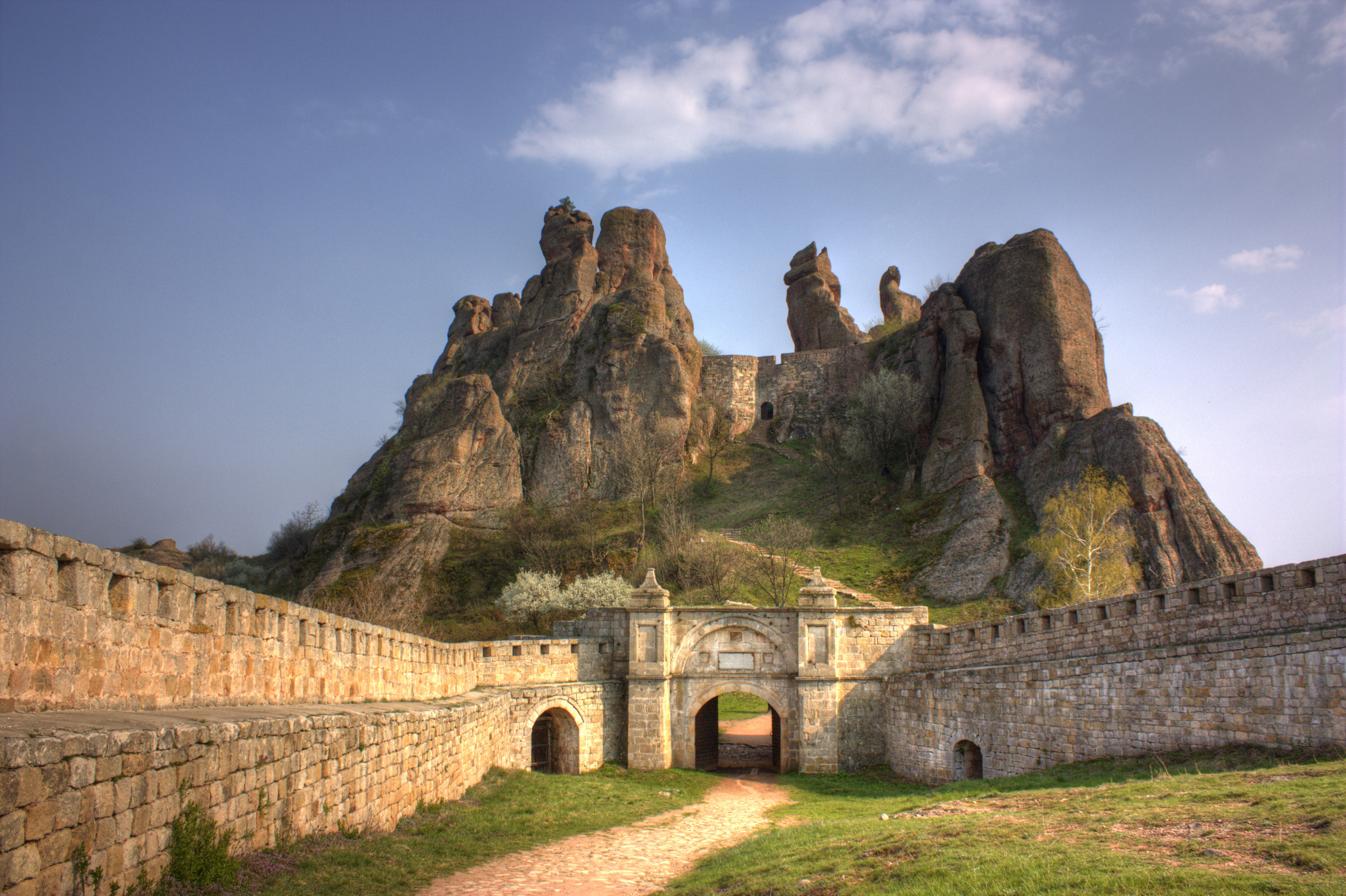
The Belogradchik Fortress

The following table shows the change of the population during the last four decades.

Belogradchik Municipality
**Year**	1975	1985	1992	**2001**	2005	2007	2009	**2011**
**Population**	12,255	11,048	9,896	8,217	7,553	7,270	7,045	6,602
Sources: Census 2001, Census 2011, „pop-stat.mashke.org“,

=== Religion ===
According to the latest Bulgarian census of 2011, the religious composition, among those who answered the optional question on religious identification, was the following:

Religious composition of Belogradchik Municipality
Orthodox Christianity	71.7%
Catholicism	0.3%
Protestantism	0.6%
Islam	0.1%
No religion	19.2%
Prefer not to answer, others and indefinable	8.1%

An overwhelming majority of the population of Belogradchik Municipality identify themselves as Christians. At the 2011 census, 71.7% of respondents identified as Orthodox Christians belonging to the Bulgarian Orthodox Church.

== See also ==
- Provinces of Bulgaria
- Municipalities of Bulgaria
- List of cities and towns in Bulgaria
