= Prauzhda =

Prauzhda Праужда
- Village
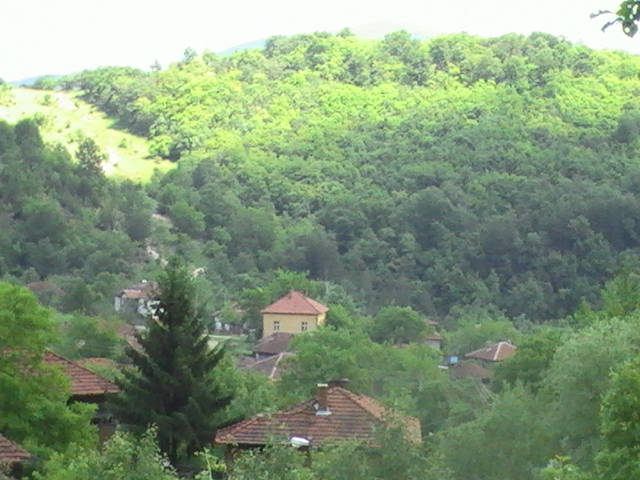

- Location within Bulgaria
- Coordinates: 43°36′15″N 22°36′0″E
- Country: Bulgaria
- Province: Vidin Province
- Municipality: Belogradchik

Government
  - Mayor: Boris Nikolov

Area
  - Total: 23.892 km^{2} (9.225 sq mi)
- Elevation: 593 m (1,946 ft)

Population (31-12-2013)
  - Total: 54
- Bulgaria Guide
- Time zone: UTC+2 (EET)
  - Summer (DST): UTC+3 (EEST)
- Postal Code: 3917

Prauzhda (Bulgarian: Праужда) is a village in Vidin Province in northwestern Bulgaria. It is located in the municipality of Belogradchik. It is populated by Torlaks. Its population has decreased substantially since 1990, and many of the remaining inhabitants are over seventy years of age. The economic base of the village in farming and viticulture has declined in recent years.
