= Chiflik, Vidin Province =

Chiflik Чифлик
- Village
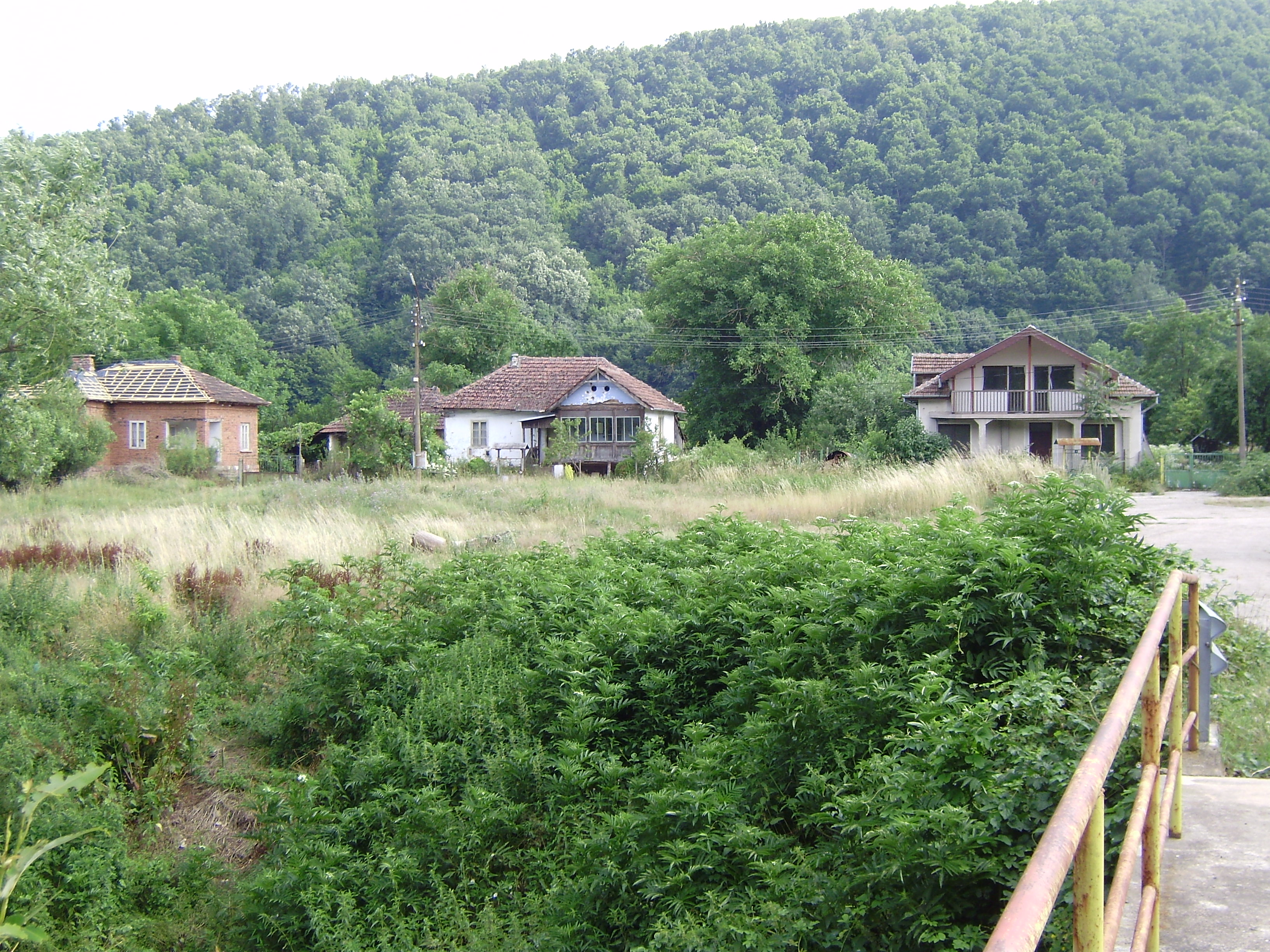

- Location within Bulgaria
- Coordinates: 43°36′0″N 22°39′42″E
- Country: Bulgaria
- Province: Vidin Province
- Municipality: Belogradchik

Government
  - Mayor: Boris Nikolov

Area
  - Total: 9.355 km^{2} (3.612 sq mi)

Population (31-12-2013)
  - Total: 91
- Bulgaria Guide
- Time zone: UTC+2 (EET)
  - Summer (DST): UTC+3 (EEST)
- Postal Code: 3912

Chiflik (Bulgarian: Чифлик) is a village in Vidin Province in northwestern Bulgaria. It is located in the municipality of Belogradchik. On Dec 23, 1961, the upper and lower villages of Chiflik merged to form the present village.

== Geography ==
The village of Chiflik is located in the Western Fore-Balkans, about 4 km southwest of the town of Belogradchik and the same distance east of the village of Praujda . It is located in the eastern foothills of the central part of the Vedernik mountain ridge, in the valley of the Stakevska River flowing from west to east . The altitude of the square in the center of the village is about 344 m.

The Belogradchik Rocks surround the village from north to east for about 2–3 km.

== History ==
The village of Chiflik was established in 1961 by the merger of the villages of Gorni Chiflik and Dolni Chiflik, Belogradchik Municipality, Vidin District.
