= Struindol =

Struindol Струиндол
- Village
- Location within Bulgaria
- Coordinates: 43°40′22″N 22°34′41″E
- Country: Bulgaria
- Province: Vidin Province
- Municipality: Belogradchik

Government
  - Mayor: Boris Nikolov

Area
  - Total: 9.973 km^{2} (3.851 sq mi)
- Elevation: 388 m (1,273 ft)

Population (31-12-2013)
  - Total: 26
- Bulgaria Guide
- Time zone: UTC+2 (EET)
  - Summer (DST): UTC+3 (EEST)
- Postal Code: 3919

Struindol (Bulgarian: Струиндол) is a village in Vidin Province in northwest Bulgaria. It is located in the municipality of Belogradchik.

== Population ==
As of 2011, the village of Struindol has 27 inhabitants, down from its peak of 387 people in 1934. Its population is nearly evenly split among ethnic Bulgarians (52%) and ethnic Romani people (48%). Most inhabitants identify themselves as Christians, belonging to the Bulgarian Orthodox Church.
