= Slivovnik =

Slivovnik Сливовник
- Village
- Location within Bulgaria
- Coordinates: 43°40′39″N 22°38′38″E
- Country: Bulgaria
- Province: Vidin Province
- Municipality: Belogradchik

Government
  - Mayor: Boris Nikolov

Area
  - Total: 6.546 km^{2} (2.527 sq mi)
- Elevation: 321 m (1,053 ft)

Population (31-12-2013)
  - Total: 14
- Bulgaria Guide
- Time zone: UTC+2 (EET)
  - Summer (DST): UTC+3 (EEST)
- Postal Code: 3915

Slivovnik (Bulgarian: Сливовник) is a village in Vidin Province in northwestern Bulgaria. It is located in the municipality of Belogradchik.

== Population ==
As of 2011, the village of Slivovnik has 18 inhabitants, down from its peak of 267 people shortly after the Second World War. The village is exclusively inhabited by ethnic Bulgarians (100%). Most inhabitants identify themselves as Christians, belonging to the Bulgarian Orthodox Church.
