= Oshane =

Oshane Ошане
- Village
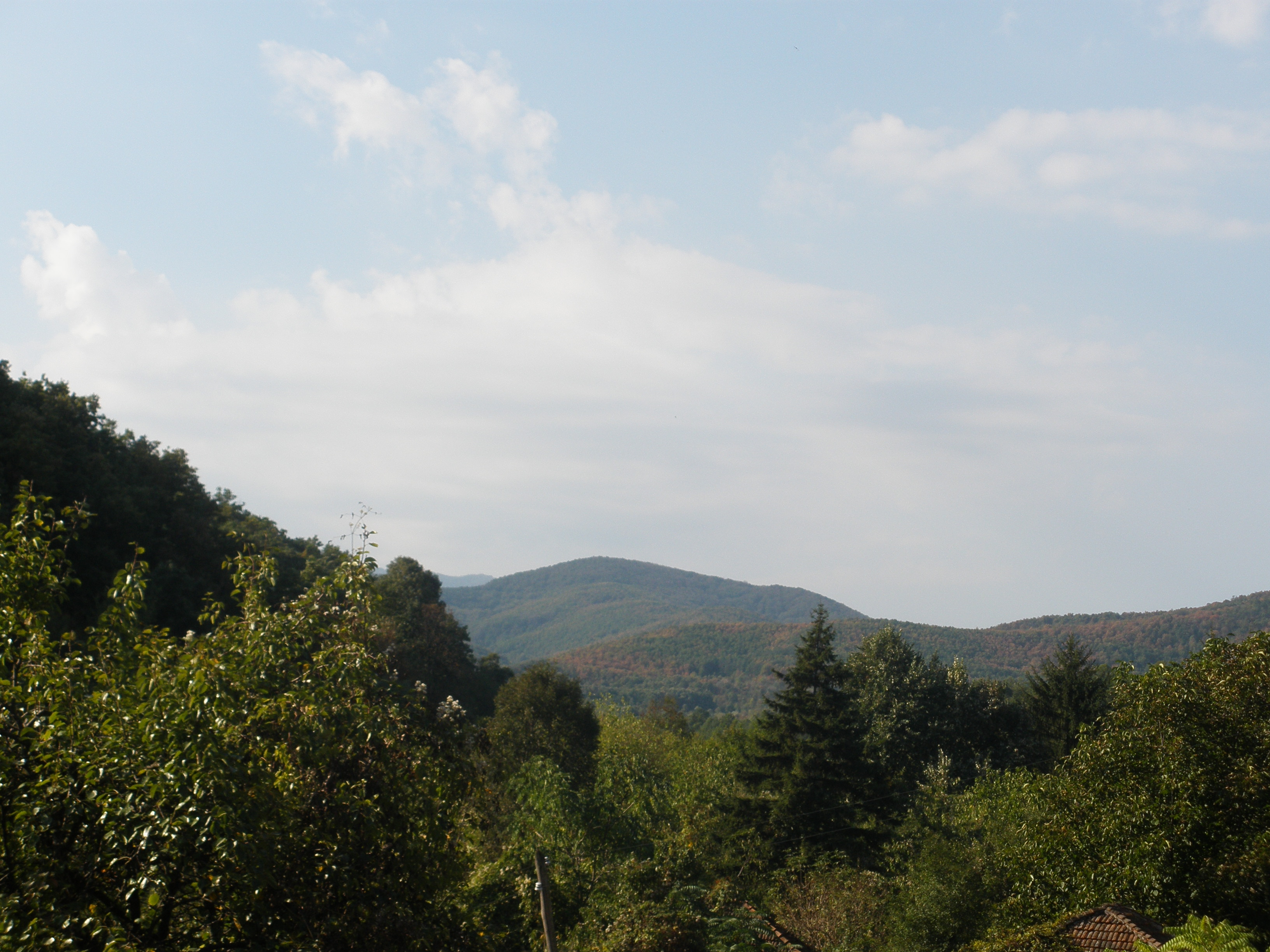
- The Balkan Mountains seen from Oshane

- Location within Bulgaria
- Coordinates: 43°41′21″N 22°33′0″E
- Country: Bulgaria
- Province: Vidin Province
- Municipality: Belogradchik

Government
  - Mayor: Boris Nikolov

Area
  - Total: 19.215 km^{2} (7.419 sq mi)
- Elevation: 391 m (1,283 ft)

Population (31-12-2013)
  - Total: 68
- Bulgaria Guide
- Time zone: UTC+2 (EET)
  - Summer (DST): UTC+3 (EEST)
- Postal Code: 3937

Oshane (Bulgarian: Ошане) is a village in Vidin Province in northwestern Bulgaria. It is located in the municipality of Belogradchik. It is located near a lake and a river runs through it. At five kilometers is the Magura Cave.

== Honours ==
Oshane Glacier on Brabant Island, Antarctica is named after the village.
