= Krachimir =

Krachimir Крачимир
- Village
- Location within Bulgaria
- Coordinates: 43°35′0″N 22°35′16″E
- Country: Bulgaria
- Province: Vidin Province
- Municipality: Belogradchik

Government
  - Mayor: Boris Nikolov

Area
  - Total: 25.811 km^{2} (9.966 sq mi)
- Elevation: 473 m (1,552 ft)

Population (31-12-2013)
  - Total: 18
- Bulgaria Guide
- Time zone: UTC+2 (EET)
  - Summer (DST): UTC+3 (EEST)
- Postal Code: 3964

Krachimir (Bulgarian: Крачимир) is a village in Vidin Province in northwestern Bulgaria. It is located in the municipality of Belogradchik.

== Sources ==
- Michev Nicholas & Peter Koledarov. "Dictionary of settlements and settlement names in Bulgaria 1878-1987", Sofia, 1989.
