= Belogradchik Rocks =

Group of strangely shaped rock formations in Bulgaria

- Stratigraphic range: Permian, 230 Ma
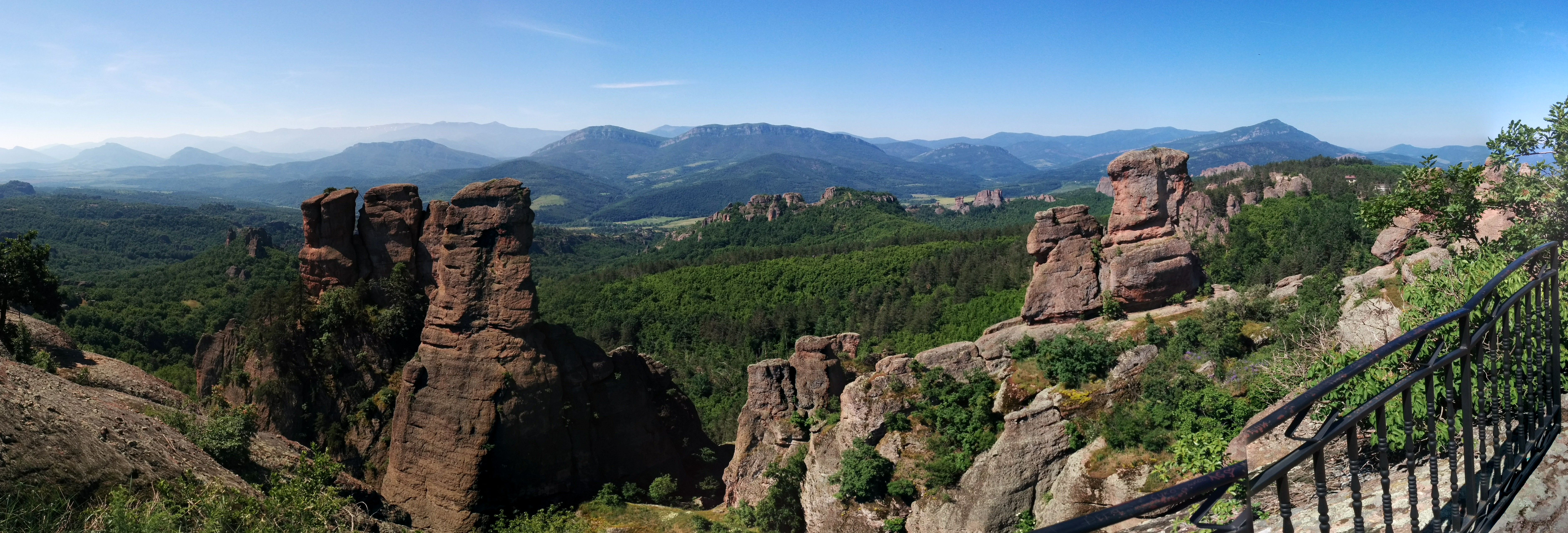
- A view of the Belogradchik Rocks
- Type: Geological unit
- Unit of: Balkan Mountains
- Area: 641.31 ha

Lithology
- Primary: Sandstone, conglomerate

Location
- Coordinates: 43°37′15″N 22°41′6″E
- Region: Vidin Province
- Country: Bulgaria

Type section
- Named for: Belogradchik

The Belogradchik Rocks (Bulgarian: Белоградчишки скали, Belogradchishki skali) are a group of strangely shaped sandstone and conglomerate rock formations located on the western slopes of the Balkan Mountains (Stara Planina) near the town of Belogradchik in northwest Bulgaria. The rocks vary in color from primarily red to yellow; some of the rocks reach up to 200 m in height. Many rocks have fantastic shapes and are associated with interesting legends. They are often named after people or objects they are thought to resemble. The Belogradchik Rocks have been declared a Natural Landmark by the Bulgarian government and are a major tourist attraction in the region. They are the only habitat of the critically endangered Bulgarian endemic plant Hieracium belogradcense.

== Geography ==
The Belogradchik Rocks are spread over the western part of the Balkan Mountains and cover an area of 50 km^{2} (19 sq mi). They extend from the village of Rabisha in the west to the village of Belotintsi in the east.

The central group of rocks is situated just to the south and adjacent to the town of Belogradchik. Located here are several notable formations: Adam and Eve, the Mushrooms, the Schoolgirl, the Bear, the Dervish, the Shepherd Boy, the Lion, the Camel, the Madonna, the Horseman, the Monks, the goddess Bendida, the Rebel Velko, and many other stone figures.

The second group of rocks lies to the west of Belogradchik. The rocks are of the Alpine variety and are surrounded by steep precipices. The most famous of these rocks are Zbegovete, Erqupriya, and Boritch.

The third group of rocks lies 4 km (2.5 miles) to the east of Belogradchik and includes the rocks around the Latin Gate and the Lipenik Cave.

The fourth group of rocks lies between the villages of Borovitsa and Falkovets. These rocks include the Pine Stone, the Bee Stone, the Torlak, and the Maid's Rock.

The fifth group of rocks lies between the villages of Gyurgich and Belotintsi.

== Geology ==
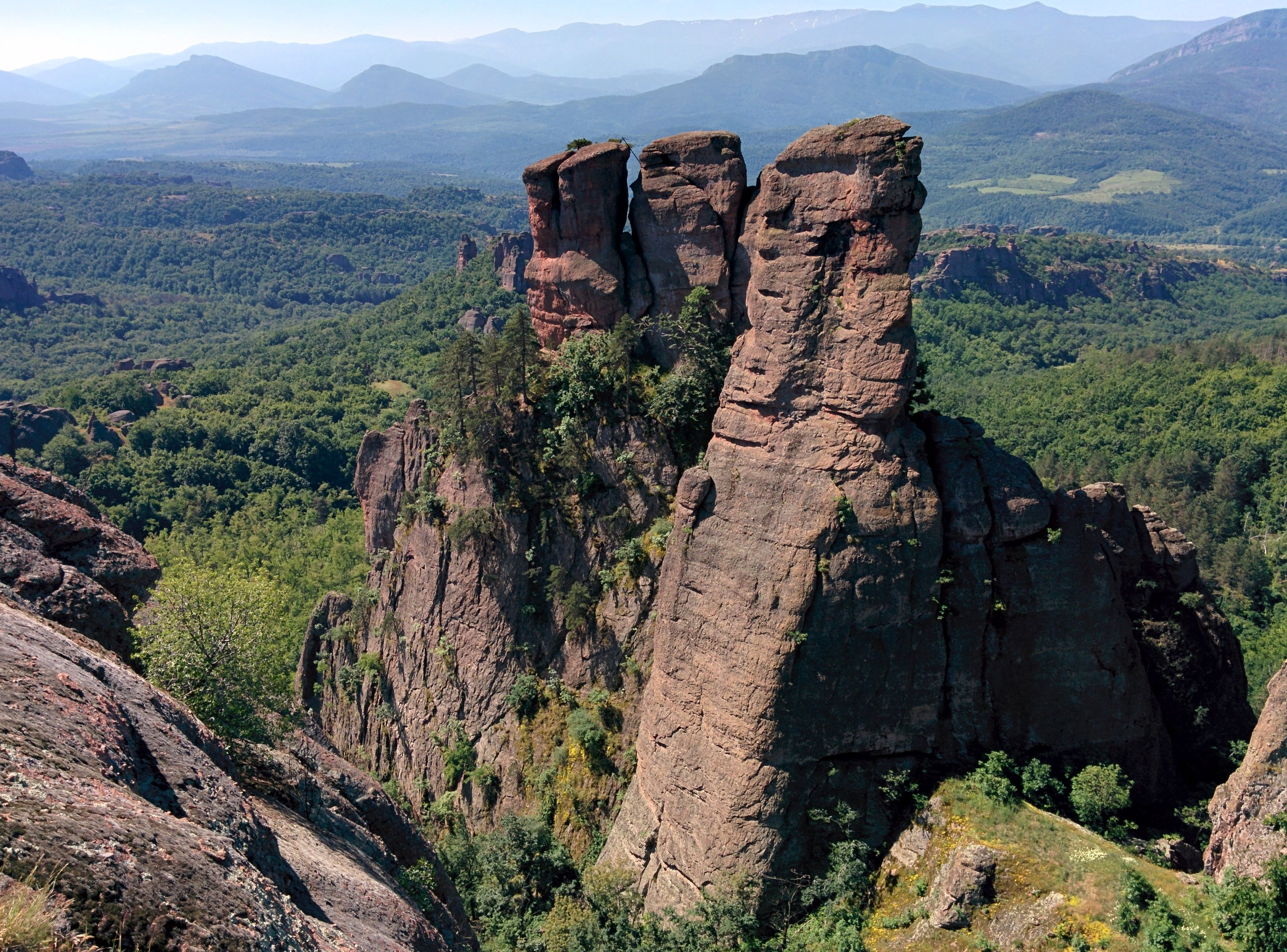

Many rock figures and small valleys with steep vertical slopes have formed over hundreds of millions of years as a result of the natural processes of erosion, denudation, growth of mosses and lichens, and other natural factors.

The formation of the Belogradchik Rocks started during the Permian period, about 230 million years ago, when the tectonic cycle was folding to create the Balkan Mountains and elevating the region of Belogradchik.

Later, during the Triassic period, the region became the floor of a shallow sea. At the same time, the destruction of the earlier Paleozoic rocks formed enormous quantities of gravel, sand and clay, which were deposited by the rivers into the sea basin. The sediment piled up and gradually became thicker layers of conglomerates and sandstone, with the conglomerate pieces becoming well rounded over time by the forces of water.

During the Jurassic period, over a period of 20 million years, the layered materials became firmly glued together by sand-clay solder or silicon. The hot and dry climate formed a great amount of iron oxide, or hematite, which gave the rocks their rusty red color. When the Earth's crust started to settle, lighter and smaller sandstones merged with the red conglomerates.

At the beginning of the Cenozoic era and the early Alpine tectonic cycle, large anticlines, or folds were being formed in the Balkan Mountains, and during this time the region turned to dry land. About 45 million years ago, the rising of the Belogradchik anticline began, and during this folding, the limestone and the conglomerates in the core cracked, creating vertical and horizontal rifts in the ridge of the anticline. In the core of the Belogradchik anticline, Paleozoic rocks are found and the slopes are formed of conglomerates, sandstone, and Jurassic limestone.

The vertical penetration and surface rivers favored vertical erosion of the rock layers, and the rifts, where tectonic movements occurred, were transformed by the erosion in small valleys and passes with vertical or steep slopes forming separate vertical blocks seen today as the rock figures.

== Tourism ==
The Belogradchik Rocks are a major tourist destination in northwest Bulgaria, along with the town of Belogradchik and the Belogradchik Fortress, which incorporates the rocks as part of its natural defense, and the nearby Magura Cave, situated near the village of Rabisha. Another tourist attraction in the area is the Baba Vida medieval fortress in the nearby town of Vidin on the Danube river.

The Bulgarian Committee of the Natural Environment declared the rocks as a natural monument in 1949, and the rocks were listed in the Bulgarian National Register of Natural Landmarks in 1987.

In 1984, the Belogradchik Rocks and the Magura Cave were both placed on the tentative list of places to be named to the UNESCO World Heritage Site list. The Rocks are under consideration as a Geopark in the European Geoparks Network and the UNESCO Global Geoparks Network.

In September 2008, Belogradchik was named as one of twenty finalists by the European Commission as a "European Destination of Excellence", In January 2009, the Belogradchik Rocks were named as Bulgaria's nomination in the campaign for the New 7 Wonders of Nature.

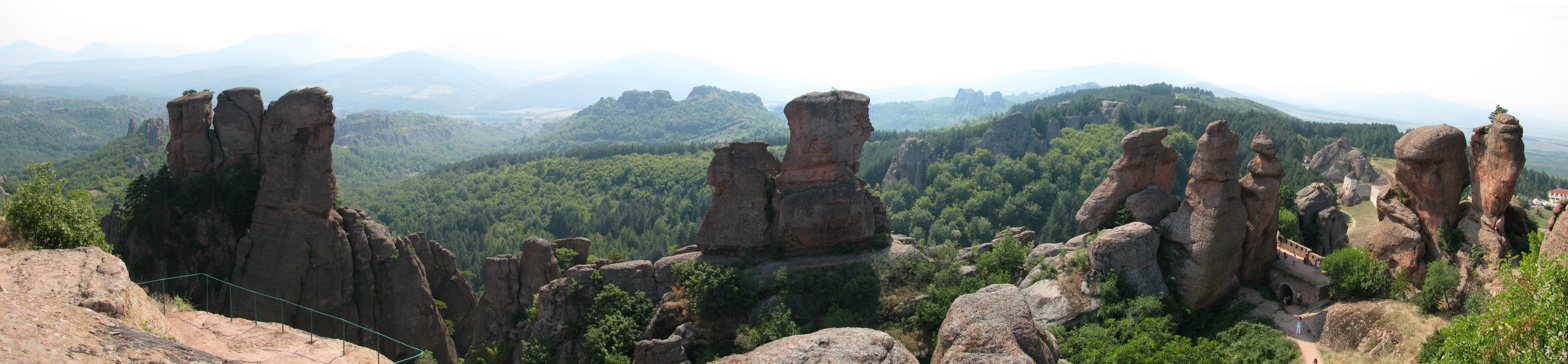
Panoramic view

== Legends ==
- The Madonna – Once there were a monastery and nunnery amongst the Belogradchik Rocks. There lived a beautiful nun, who was secretly envied by all for her beauty. More than once, the old Mother Superior reminded the nun not to forget that even though she was young and pretty, that she had taken the veil and was vowed to God. During the Petrovden celebration, a young patrician came to the festival on his white horse. Immediately, when she saw him, the nun recognized the man of her dreams. She could not resist her heartache and secretly met him, but the nun's illicit love was eventually discovered by the cries of her young child. The Mother Superior decided to severely punish the nun by all monastic canons, and even the monks from the monastery were summoned to pass judgment on her. It took a long time for the white bearded monks to draw a punishment, but at last they decided to expel her and her child out of the priory. The poor nun was doomed to a life worse than death itself. Ordinary people would treat her like a leper, and no one would dare talk to her, let alone give her shelter or food. The nun was ready to have her life taken rather than be chased out of the nunnery. As heartbreaking as her sincere plea for mercy was, it did not move the monks. As the nun was exiting the monastic gates, a miracle happened. The day became night and a frightening thunder was heard. The rocks opened up and the monastery and nunnery were both driven into the ground, and the Monks, on their retreat back to the cloister, the Madonna, bending over her child, and the Horseman, riding to his beloved on his white horse, were all turned to stone.
- The Schoolgirl – Once there lived a schoolgirl in town, a student in the hunchback dervish's school, known for her raving beauty. The schoolgirl fell in love with a young hammersmith, and they used to meet each other near Subashin's spring, known for its delicious water. But the dervish was extremely envious of this pure love. One day, he waited for the schoolgirl near the spring when she was going for some water, and attacked her. She somehow managed to wrestle out of his hands and started running to the rocks, hoping to escape the fiend. She was running for a long time between the rocks and crags, but the dervish mercilessly pursued her. Suddenly a rapacious bear came in front of the schoolgirl. Shocked by fear and amazement, she fell to her knees. She would rather have been torn apart and eaten by the bear than to be ravished in the arms of the hateful dervish. At this moment, a miracle occurred. A loud thunder was heard and the day became night, and into the darkness, a scared cry of a girl, the frightening roar of a bear, and the terrified cry of a man rang out. Then a sinister silence fell around. And when it became light again, they all stood in stone – the Schoolgirl, the Bear in front of her, and the despicable Dervish behind her. And the sun was shining bright and peaceful as if nothing had happened.
