= Borovitsa, Vidin Province =

Borovitsa Боровица
- Village
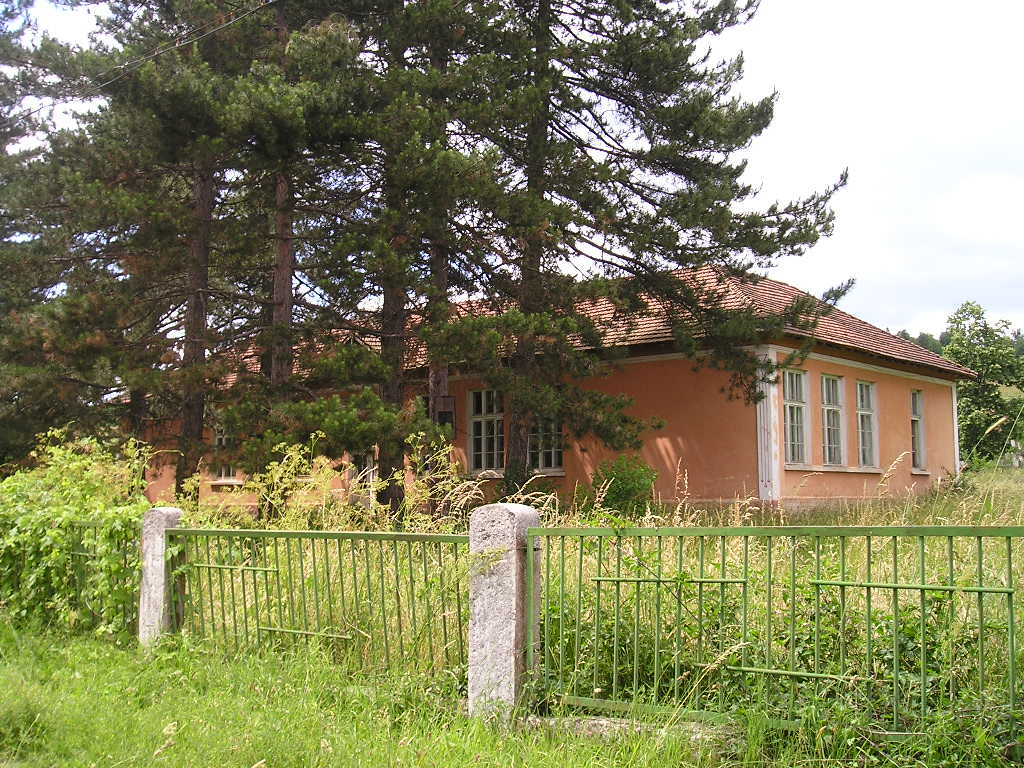

- Location within Bulgaria
- Coordinates: 43°34′41″N 22°43′51″E
- Country: Bulgaria
- Province: Vidin Province
- Municipality: Belogradchik

Government
  - Mayor: Boris Nikolov

Area
  - Total: 23.533 km^{2} (9.086 sq mi)
- Elevation: 257 m (843 ft)

Population (31-12-2013)
  - Total: 149
- Bulgaria Guide
- Time zone: UTC+2 (EET)
  - Summer (DST): UTC+3 (EEST)
- Postal Code: 3955

Borovitsa (Bulgarian: Боровица) is a village in Vidin Province, Bulgaria. It is in the municipality of Belogradchik.

Borovitsa means "pine stone" - the name of the rock that towers over the village. On top of the rock was once a huge pine tree, eventually destroyed by fire. The ancient village was located next to the stone, so people could hide in the woods in case of attack by the Ottoman invaders. After the Liberation of Bulgaria, the village has gradually been built out along the Lom River and along the road to Belogradchik. The inhabitants have in the past engaged in farming, animal husbandry and beekeeping. A few kilometers from the village the Romans had a military camp - Falcon or Falkovets. A Roman colony was on the outskirts of Borovitsa.

The only remnants remain of the old village church, built in 1866, situated 2.5 km from the village to the west. The frescoes, icons and wooden altar are preserved. The bell tower dominates the valley among the rocks and woods. Nearby are the remains of a small school. At about 500 meters from the village is a waterfall, "Boboka".

== Landmarks ==
The Rakovitsa Monastery "Holy Trinity," is operational after being rebuilt. It was restored by St. Pimen of Sofia in the 17th century, following its decline after the Ottoman conquest. The monastery, originally established in the 10th or 11th century, was destroyed by fire at the end of the 18th century.

The Belogradchik Rocks, with their distinctive formations, are located about 7 kilometers northwest of Borovitsa. Also, the Magura cave, known for its notable features, can be found approximately 35 kilometers to the northwest of the village.

About 500 meters from Borovitsa lies the Boboka waterfall. Close to the village, you can find the Borov kamak and the Neprivetlivata cave. Additionally, a Roman military camp named Falcon was situated a few kilometers from Borovitsa.

The church Chervenata carkva is approximately 2 kilometers from the village. It stands out for its construction from red stone, which resembles the rock formations of the Belogradchik Rocks.
