= Boyanovo =

Boyanovo Бояново
- Village
- Location within Perm Krai Location within Russia
- Coordinates: 58°41′N 56°58′E
- Country: Russia
- Region: Perm Krai
- District: Dobryansky District
- Time zone: UTC+5:00

Boyanovo (Russian: Бояново) is a rural locality (a village) in Dobryansky District, Perm Krai, Russia. The population was 6 as of 2010.

== Geography ==
Boyanovo is located 57 km northeast of Dobryanka (the district's administrative centre) by road. Tabory is the nearest rural locality.
