= Baba Vida =

Medieval castle in Vidin, Bulgaria

- Vidin, Bulgaria
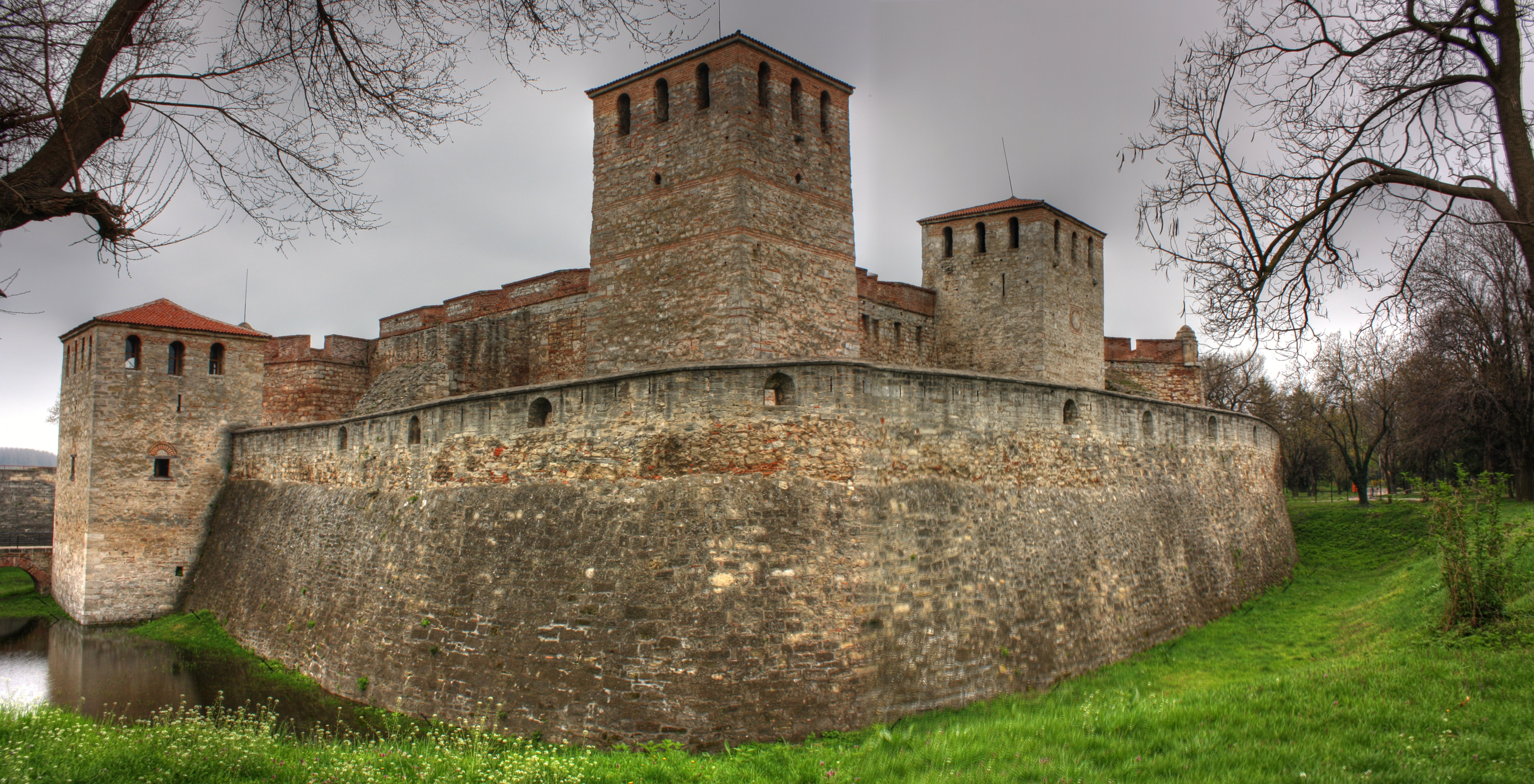
- Baba Vida

Site information
- Condition: Museum

Location
- Coordinates: 43°59′35″N 22°53′12″E

Baba Vida (Bulgarian: Баба Вида) is a medieval castle in Vidin in northwestern Bulgaria and the town's primary landmark. It consists of two concentric curtain walls and about nine towers of which three are preserved to their full medieval height, including the original battlements, and is the only entirely preserved medieval castle in the country. Baba Vida is 39 metres (128 ft) above sea level.

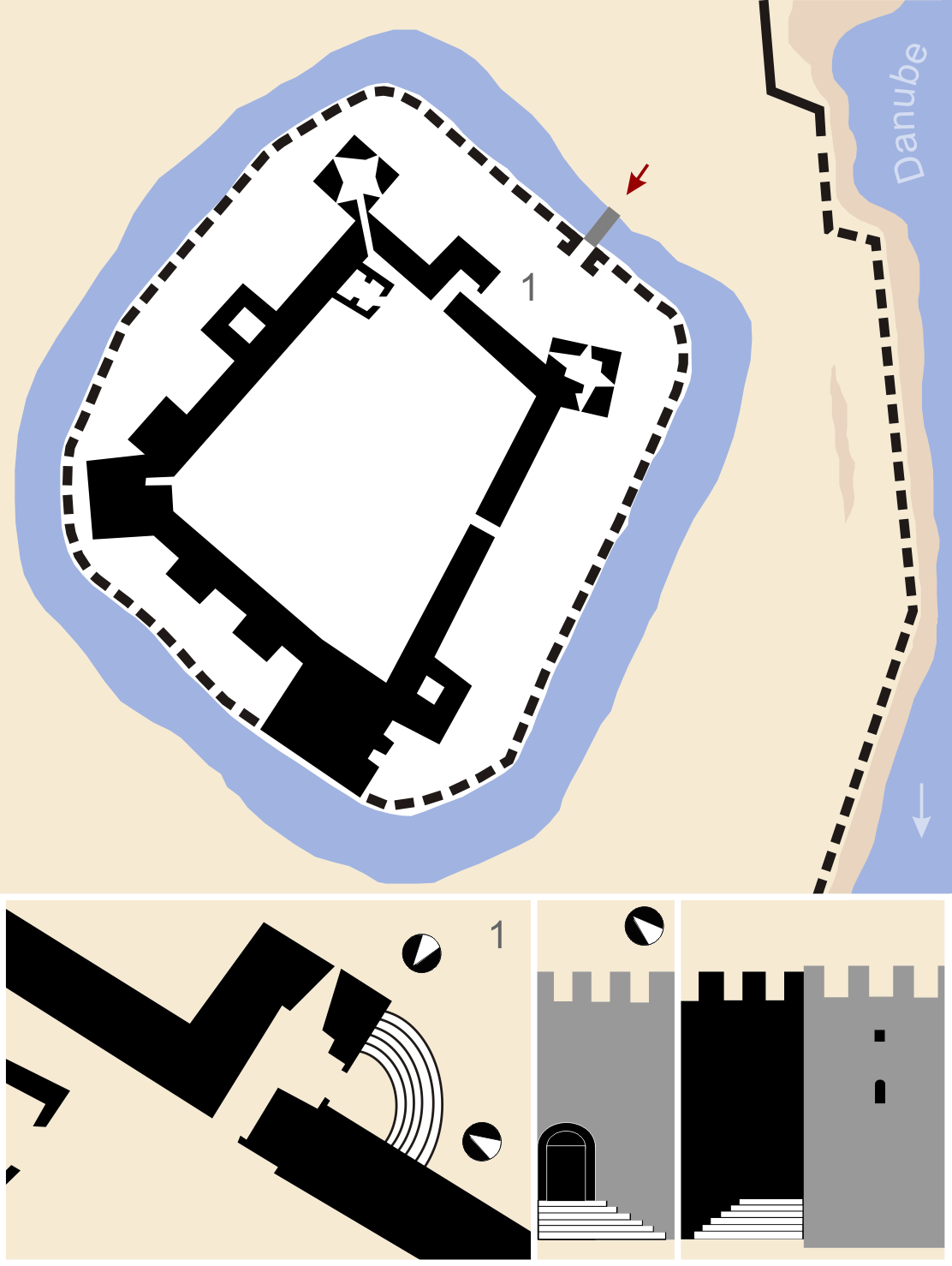
Plan of the fortress

The construction of the castle began in the 10th century at the place of the ancient Roman castell Bononia. The building of Baba Vida is tied to a legend, according to which a Danubian Bulgarian king who ruled at Vidin had three daughters: Vida, Kula, and Gamza. Prior to his death, he divided his realm among the three. Vida, the eldest, was given Vidin and the lands north to the Carpathians, Kula was awarded Zaječar and the Timok Valley, and Gamza was to rule the lands west up to the Morava. Although Gamza and Kula married to drunkard and warlike nobles, Vida remained unmarried and built the castle in her city. The name of the castle means "Granny Vida".

Baba Vida served as part of Vidin's main defensive installation during the course of the Middle Ages and acted as the citadel of the most important fortress of northwestern Bulgaria. The Baba Vida stronghold withstood an eight-month-long siege by Byzantine forces led by Basil II. It was enlarged and modernized during the rule of tsar Ivan Stratsimir (1356–1396), as whose capital it served. Between 1365 and 1369, the castle was in Hungarian hands. Vidin was suddenly attacked by the forces of Louis I of Hungary, but it took several months to conquer Baba Vida. In 1369, Ivan Sratsimir managed to regain control of his capital, albeit having to remain under Hungarian overlordship.

In 1388, the Ottomans invaded Sratsimir's lands and forced him to become their vassal. In 1396, he joined an anti-Ottoman crusade led by the King of Hungary, Sigismund, placing his resources at the crusaders' disposal. The crusade ended in the disastrous Battle of Nicopolis at Nikopol, Bulgaria, with the Ottomans capturing most of Sratsimir's domains shortly thereafter, in 1397.

The castle played a role during the Ottoman rule of Bulgaria, serving as a weapon warehouse and a prison, also as residence for Osman Pazvantoğlu, and it has been no longer used for defensive purposes since the end of the 18th century.

Today, Baba Vida castle functions as a museum. Being a popular tourist attraction, the castle is being kept in repair.

== Gallery ==
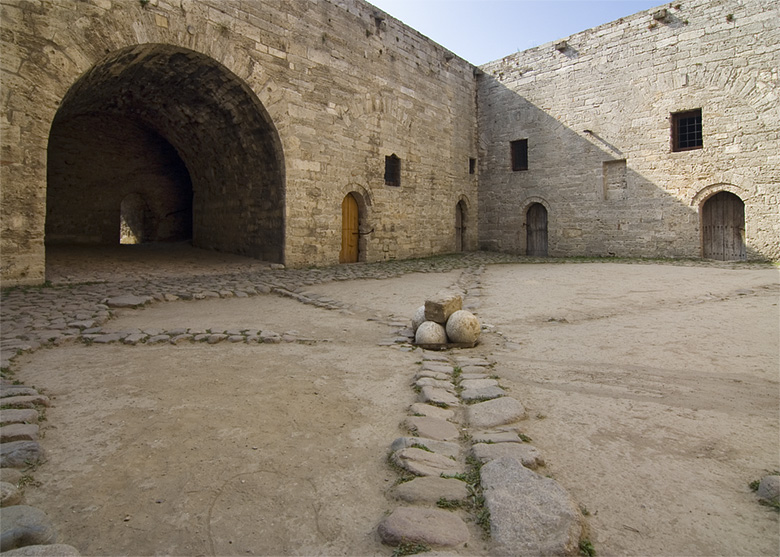
Inside the castle

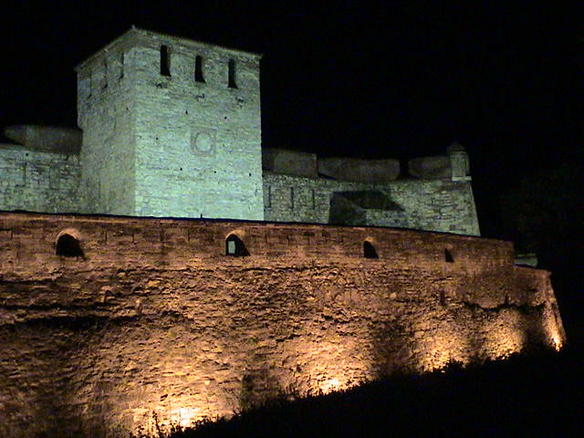

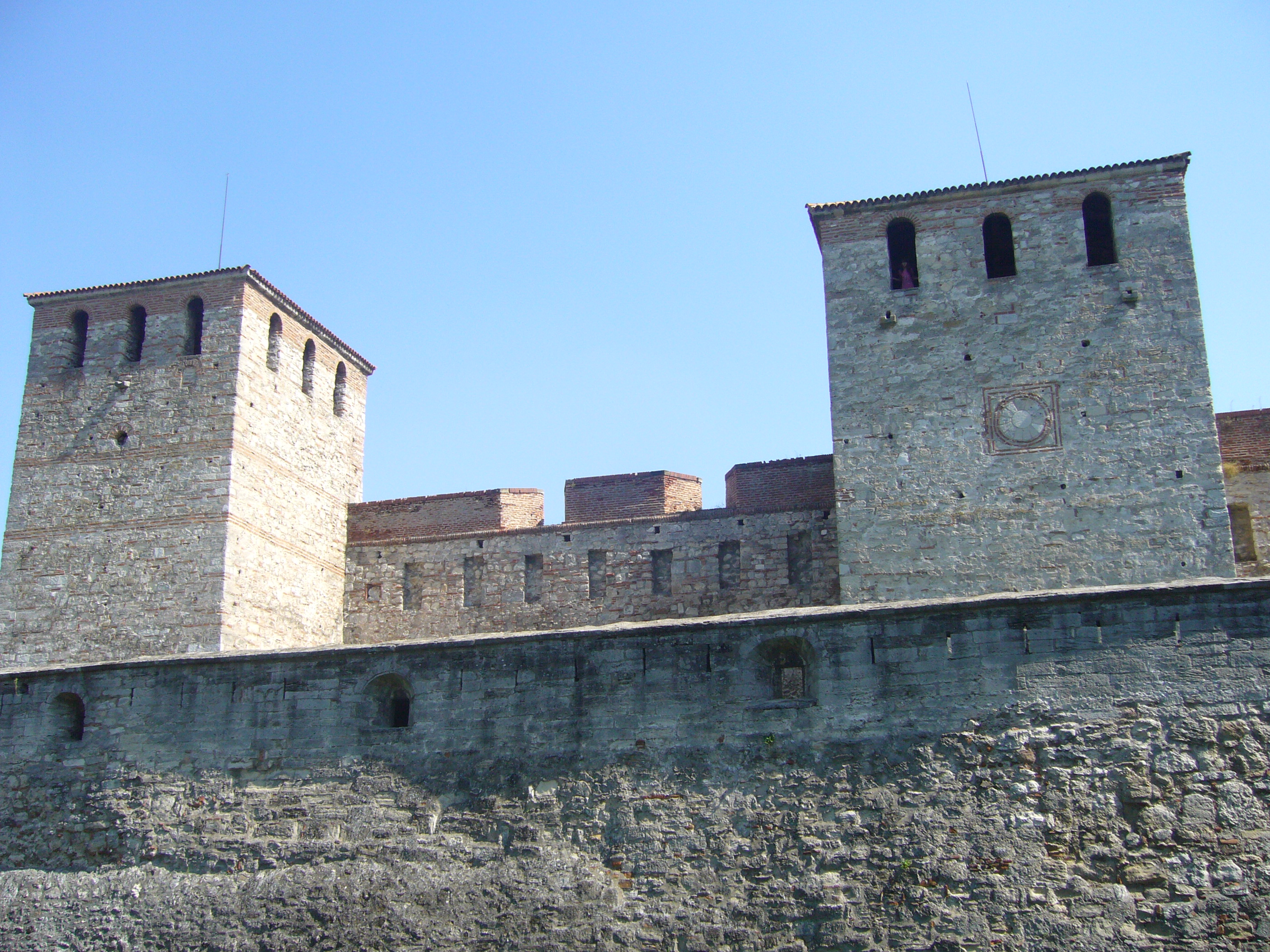

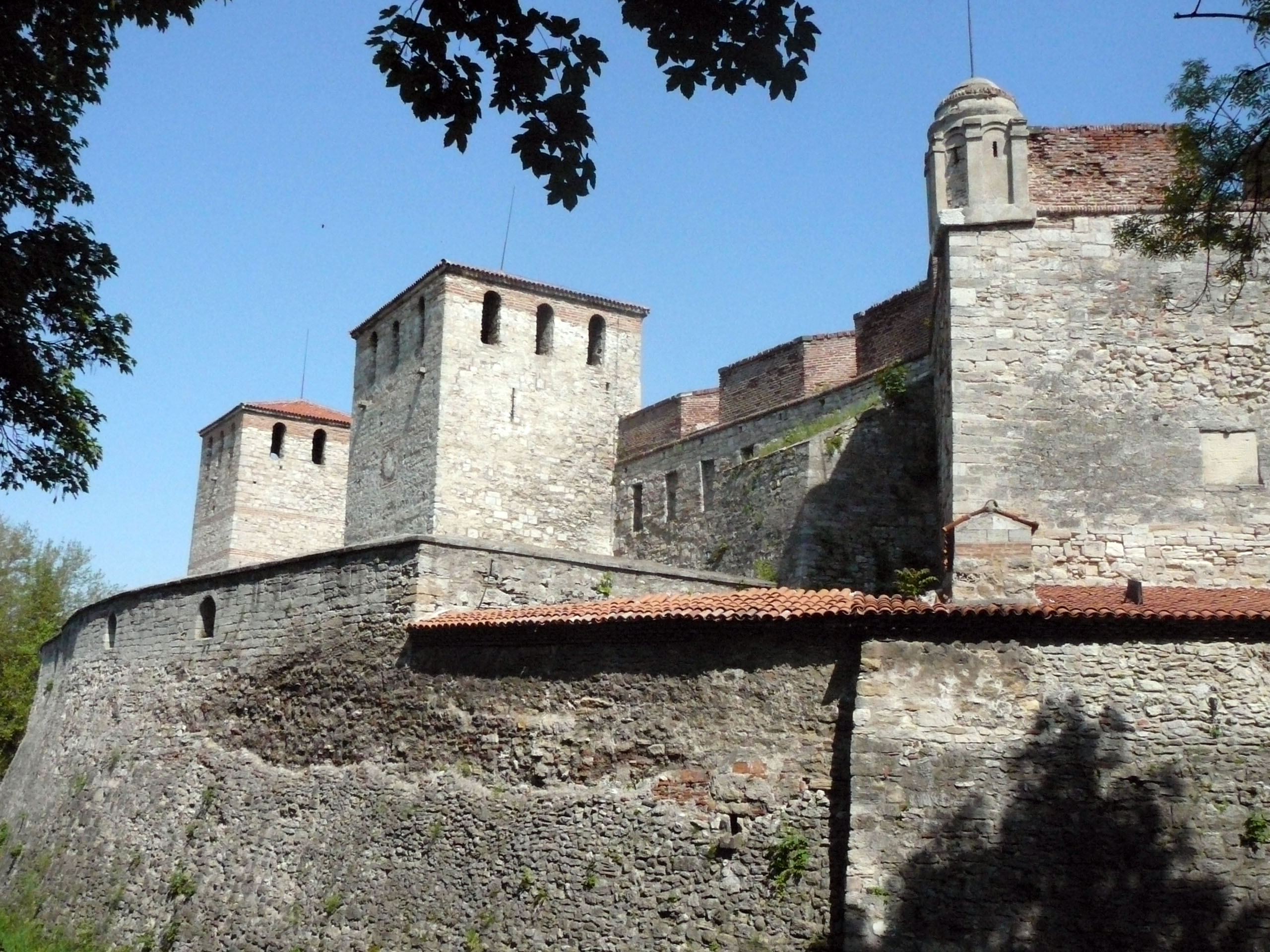

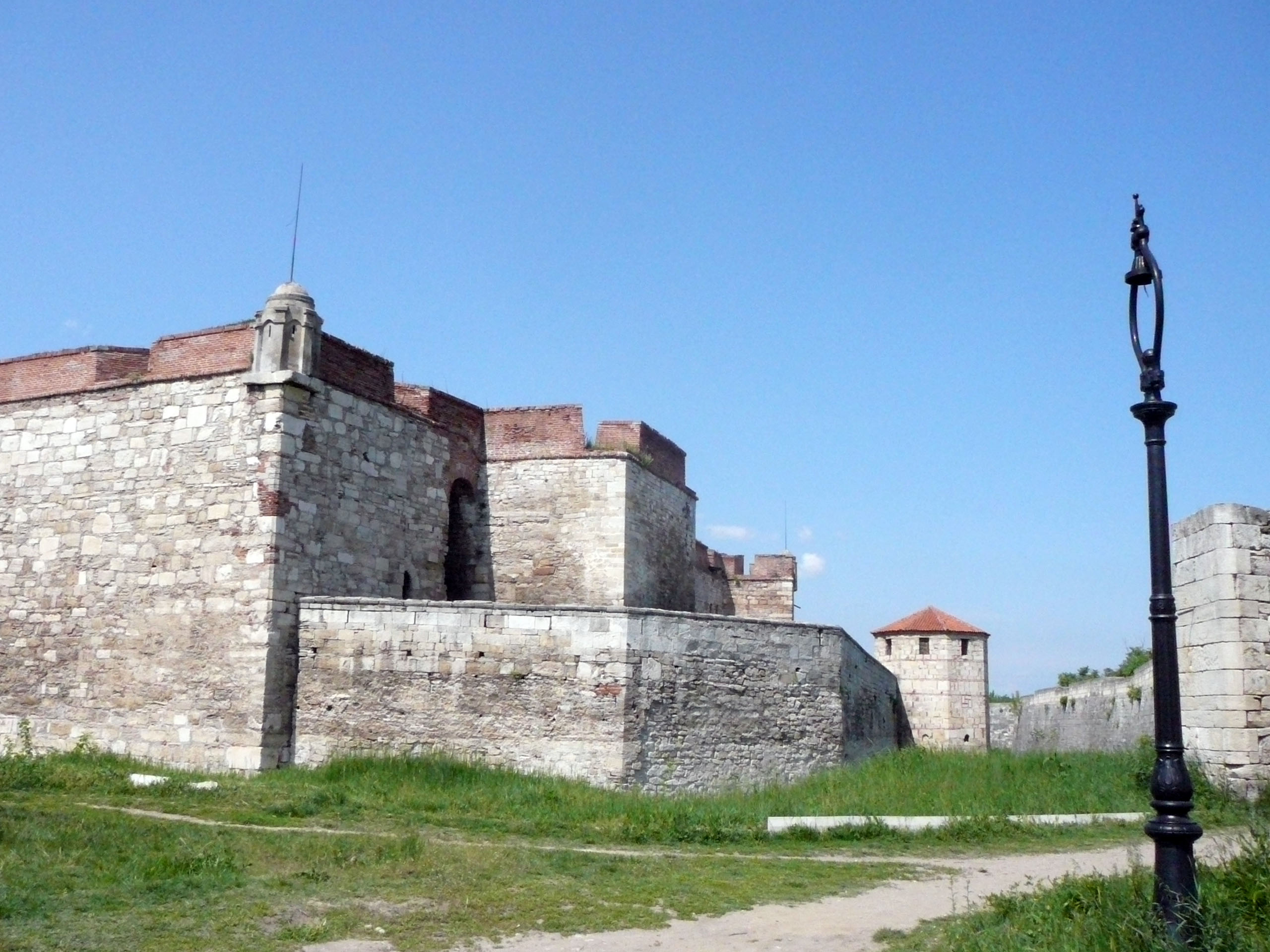

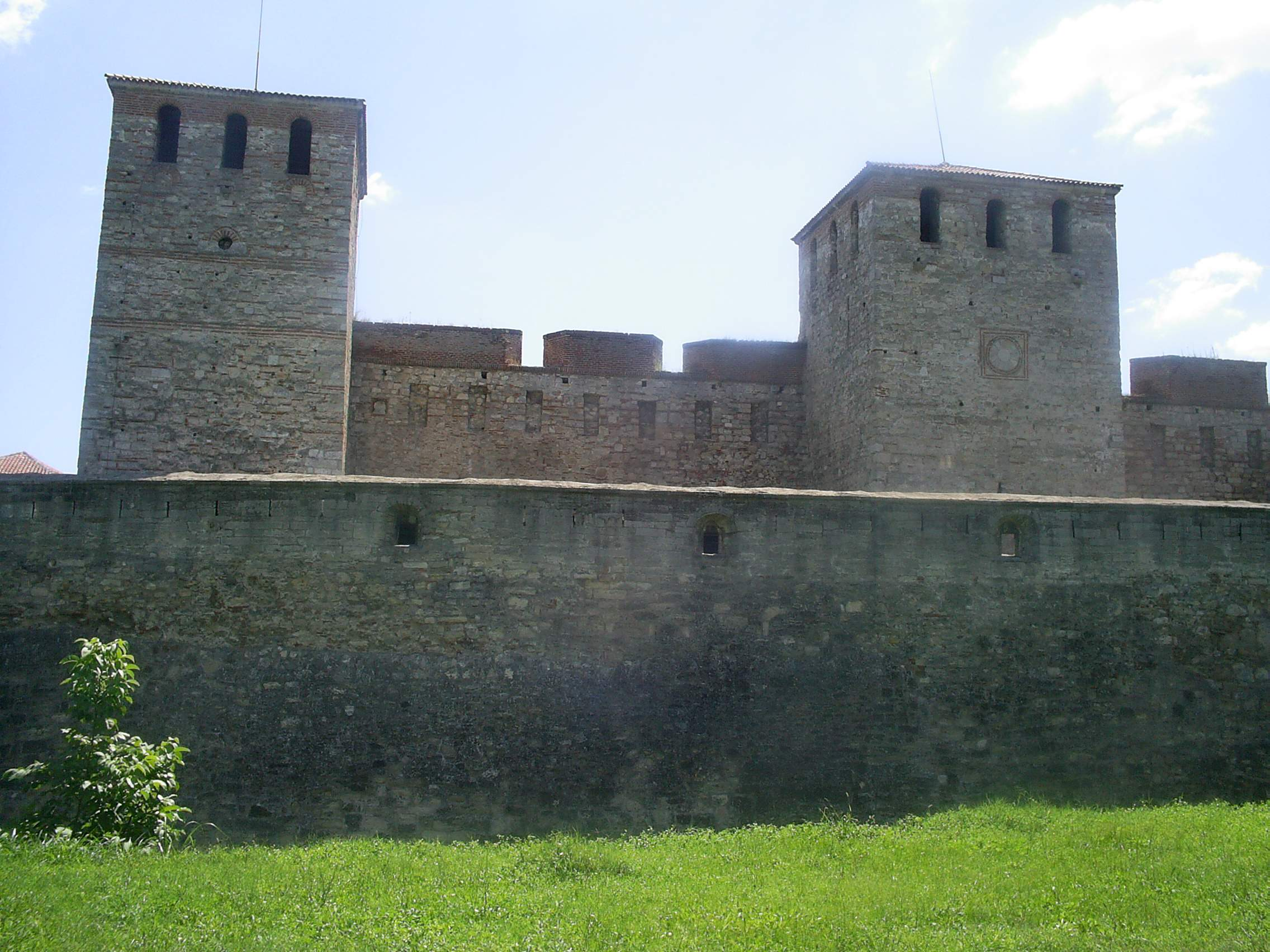

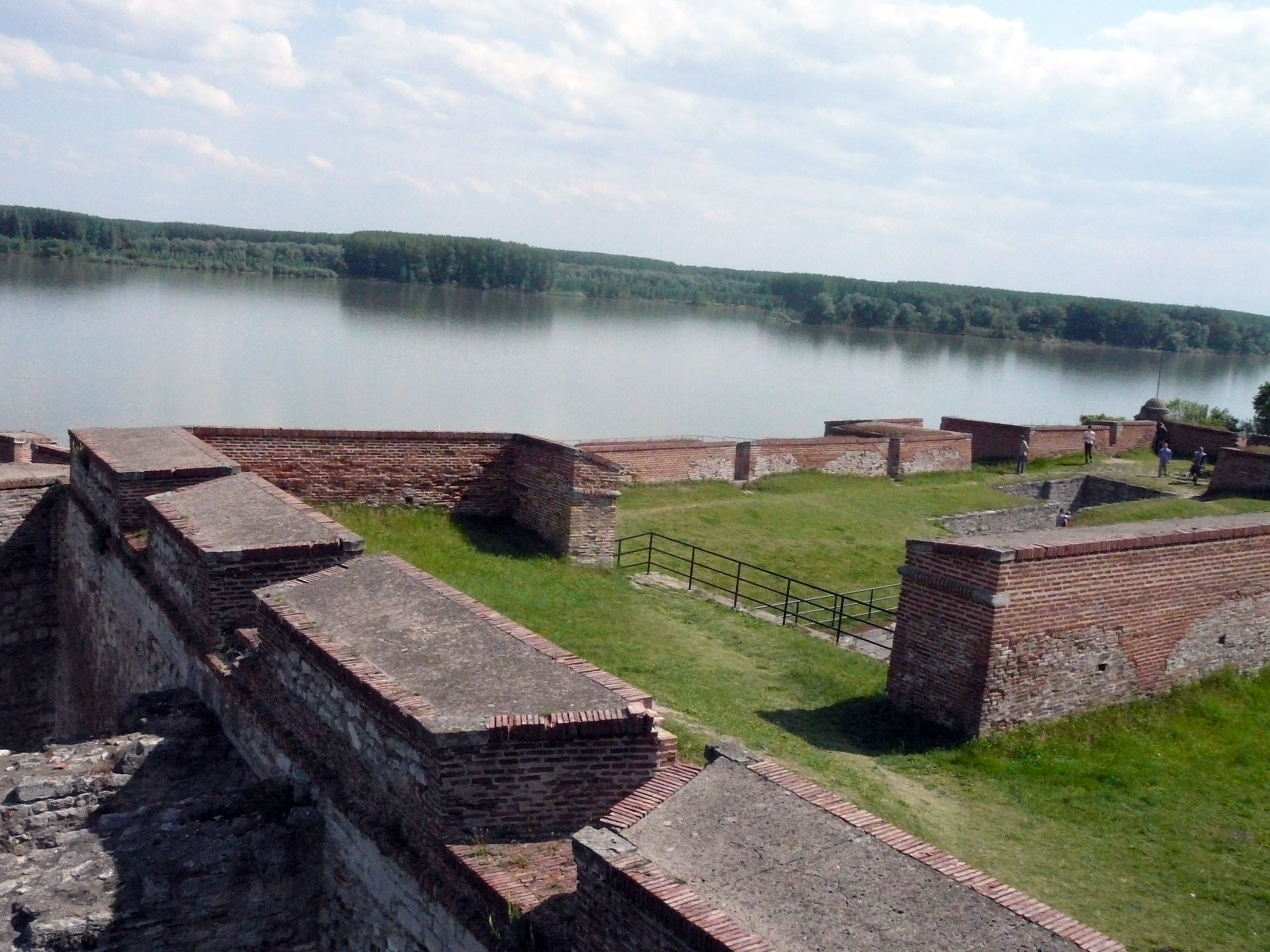

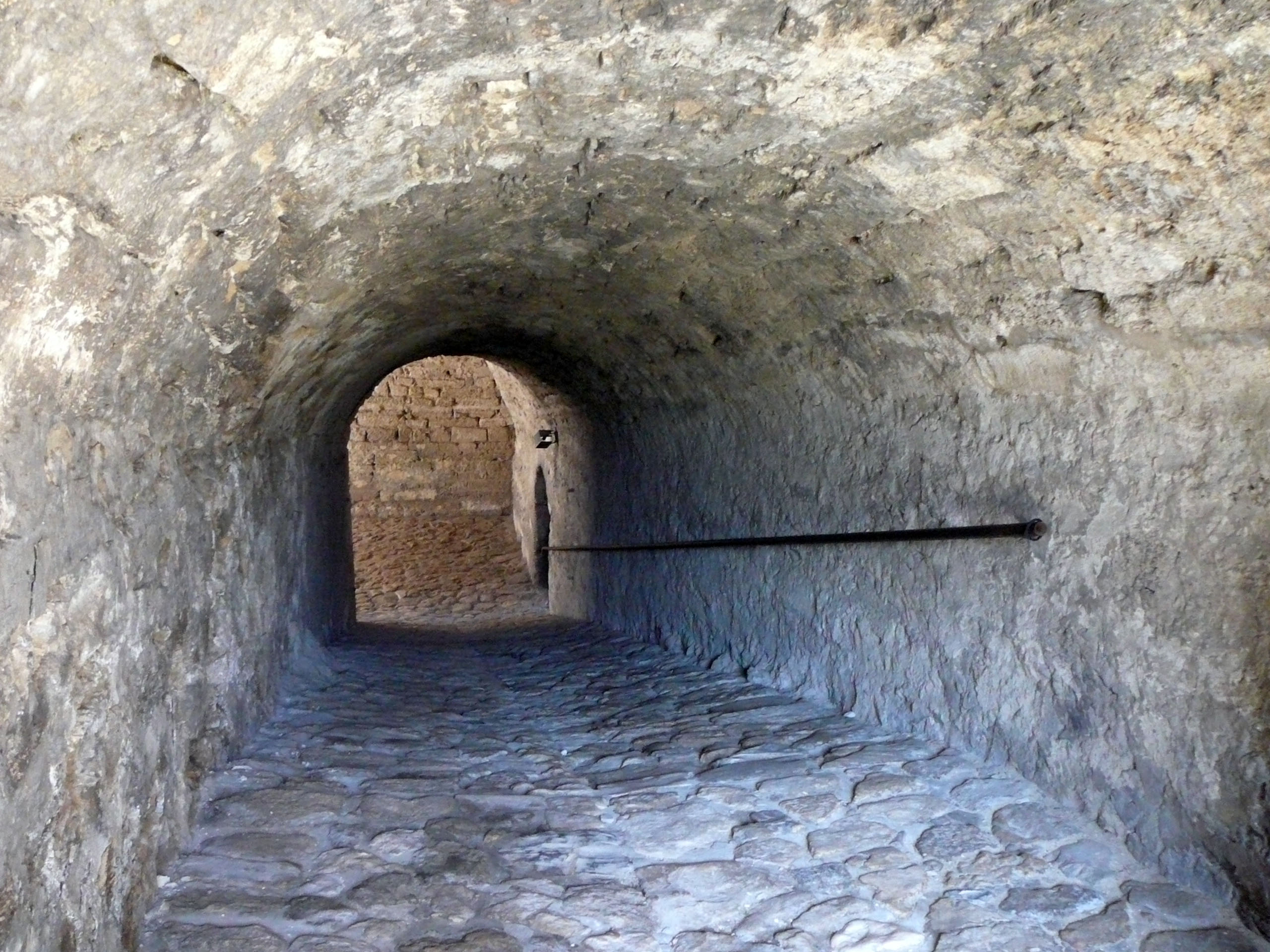

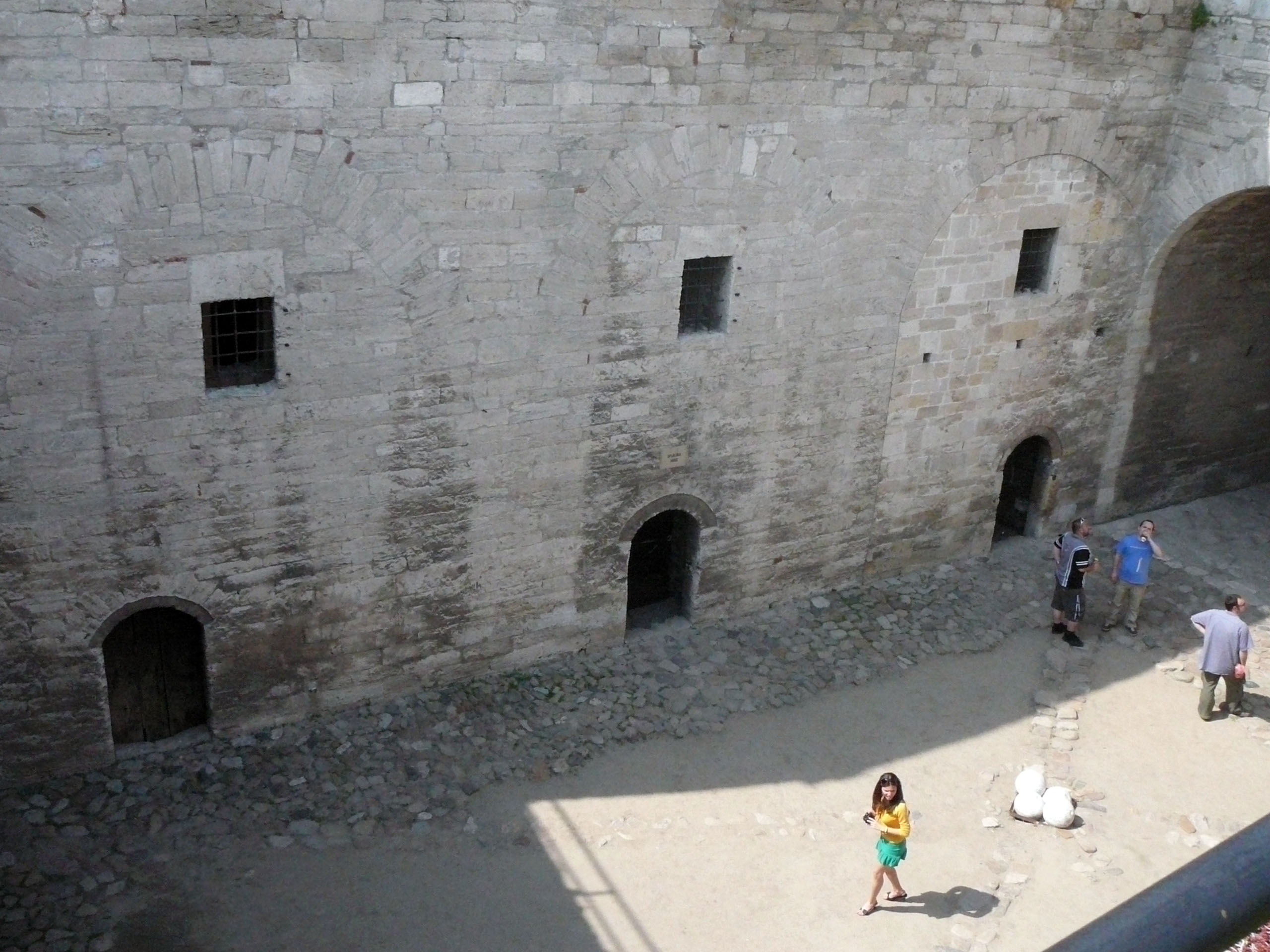

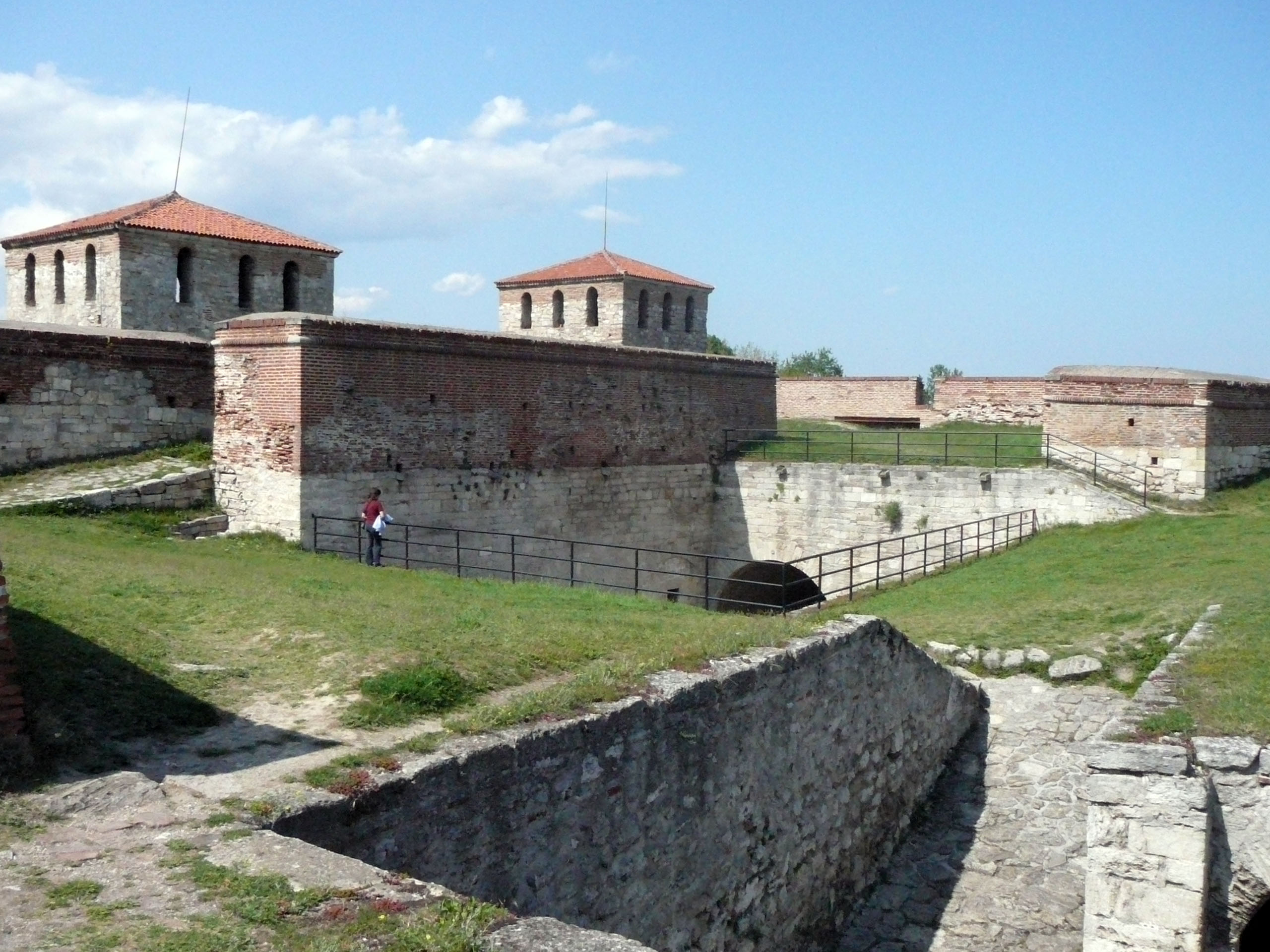

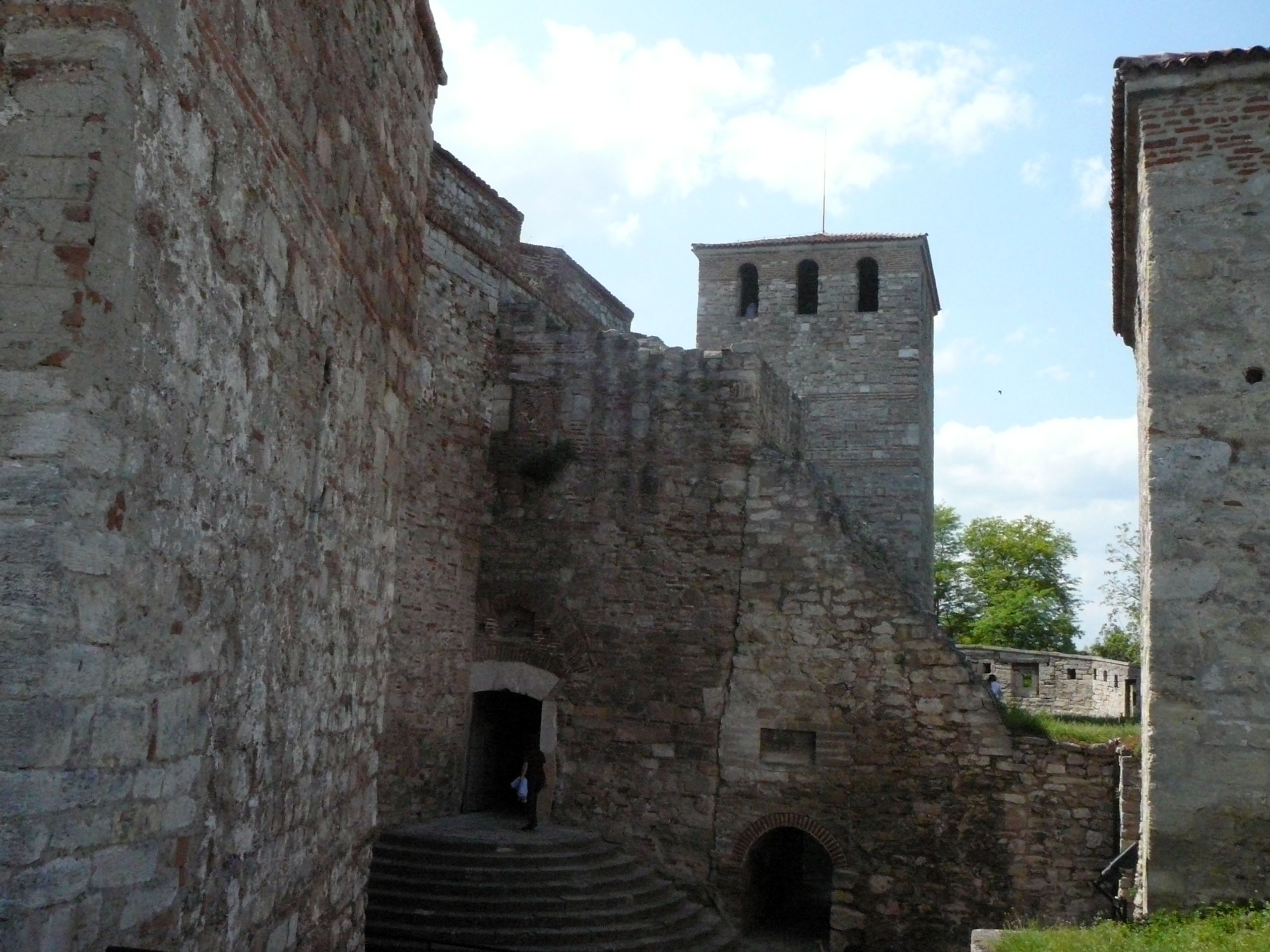

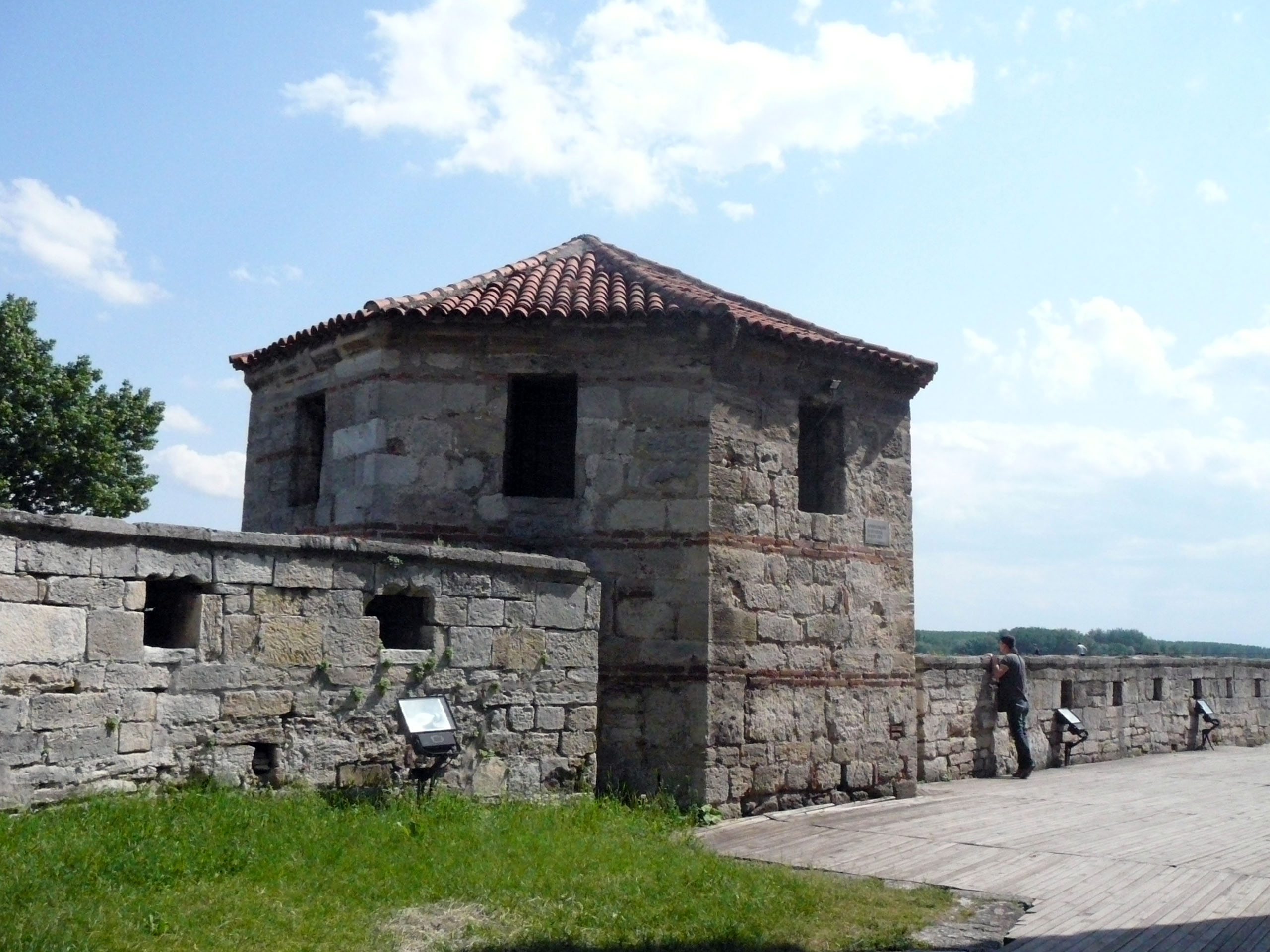
Austrian-built tower from the 17th century

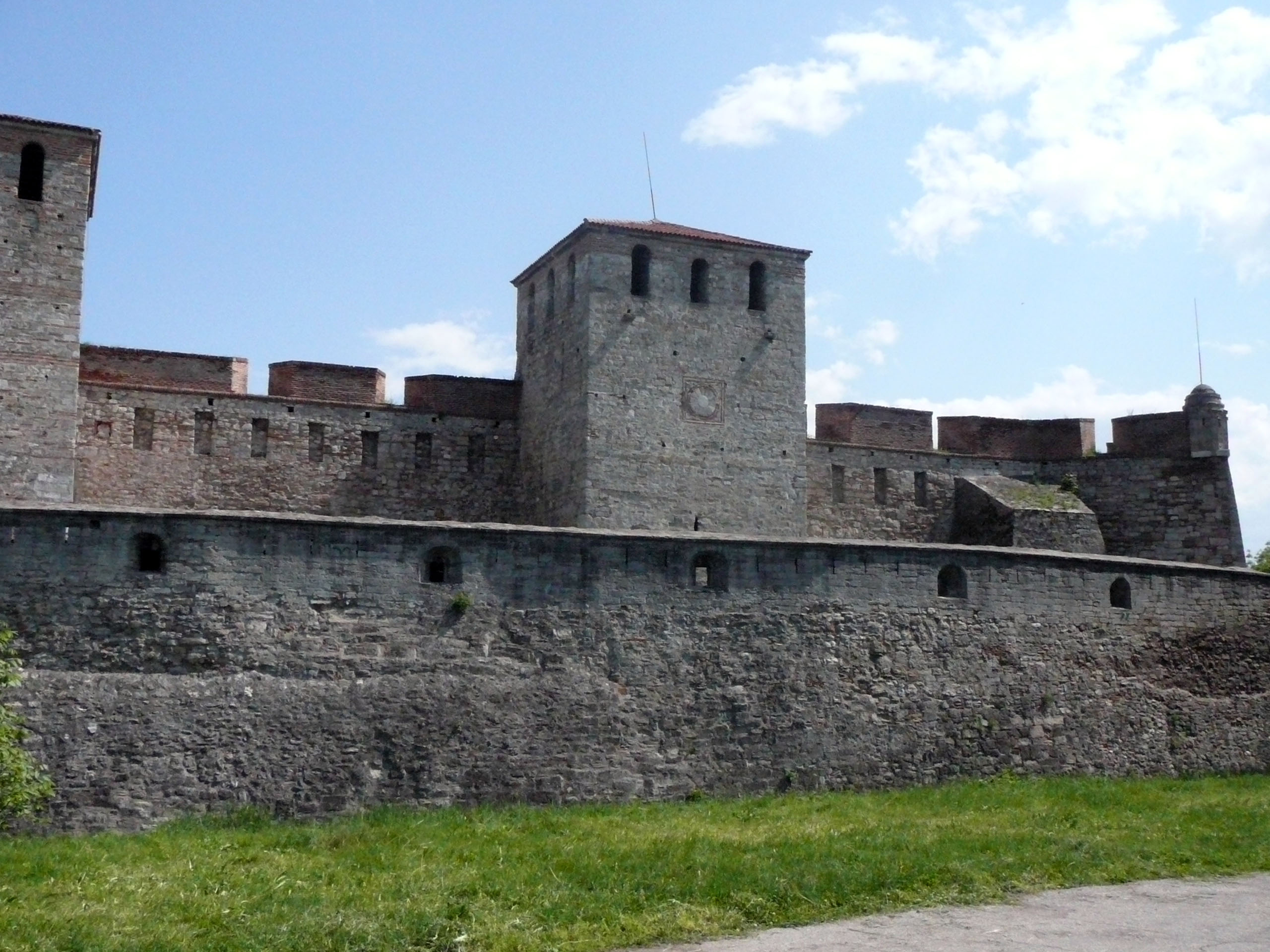

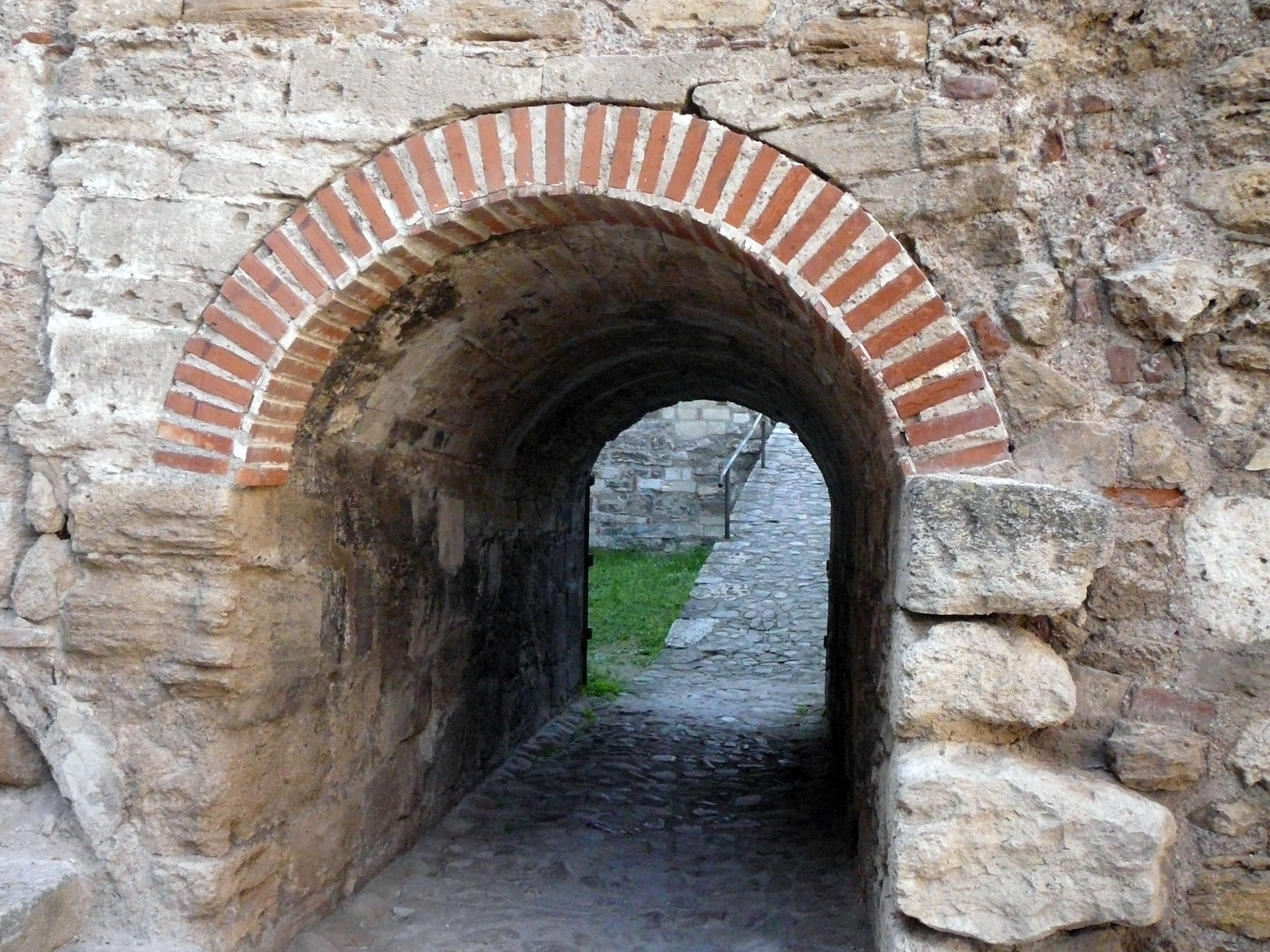

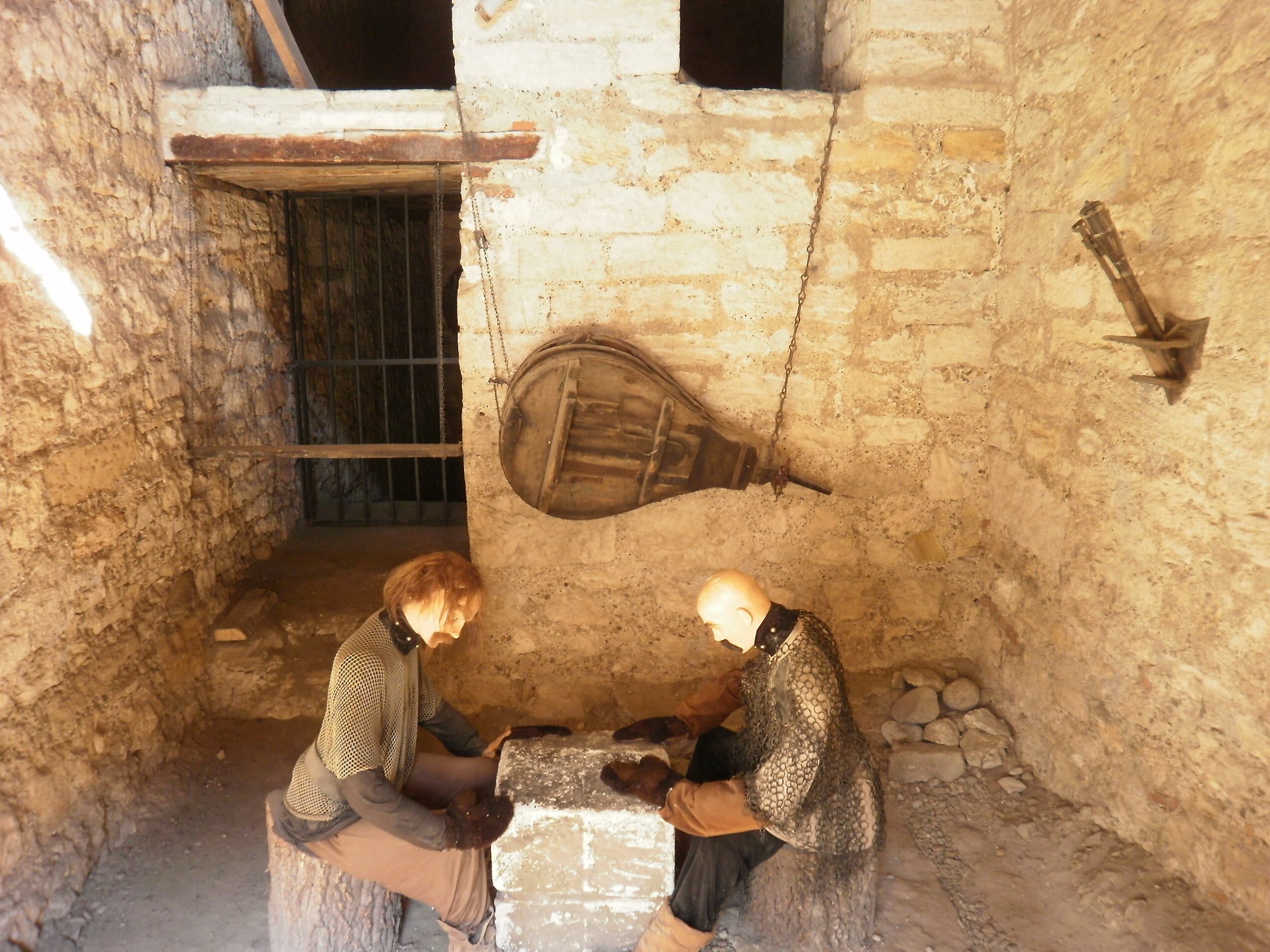

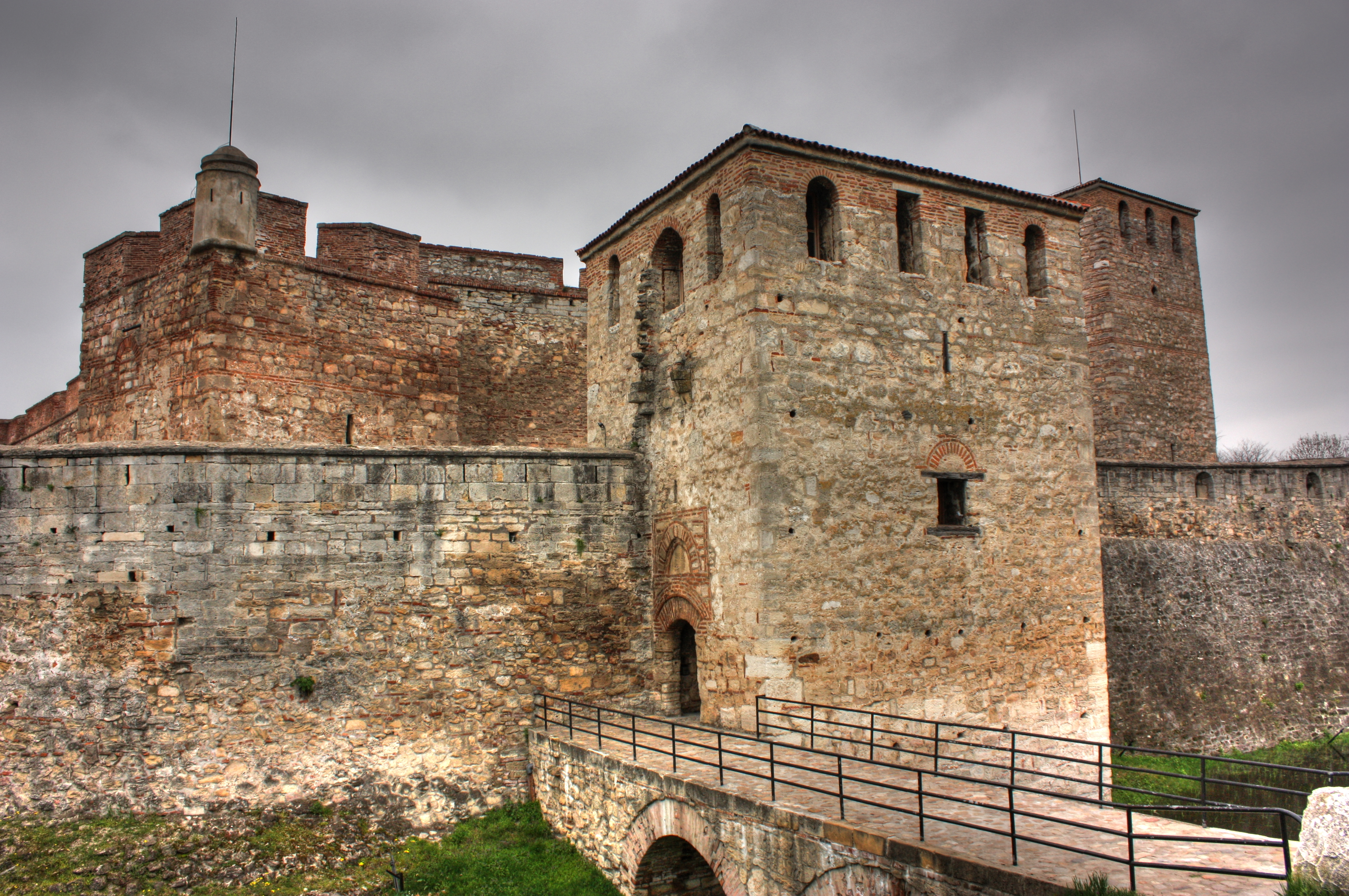
