= Vidin Province =

Province in western Bulgaria

Coordinates: 43°48′N 22°41′E

Vidin Province Област Видин
- Province
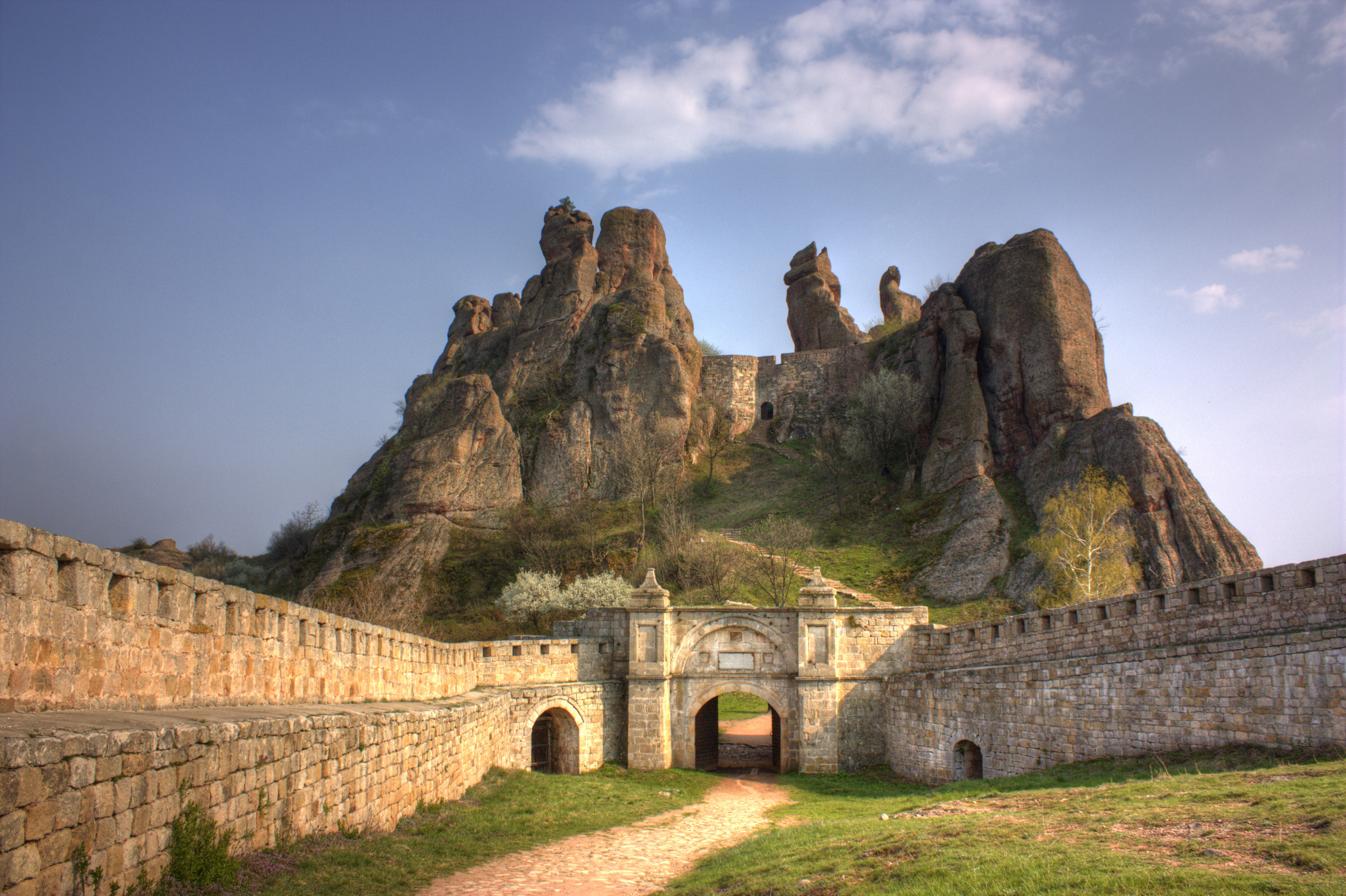
- Belogradchik Fortress

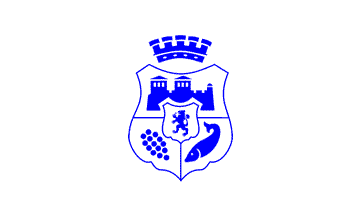
- Flag

- Location of Vidin Province in Bulgaria
- Country: Bulgaria
- Capital: Vidin
- Municipalities: 11

Area
  - Total: 3,032.9 km^{2} (1,171.0 sq mi)

Population (2023)
  - Total: 71,773
  - Density: 23.665/km^{2} (61.292/sq mi)
- Time zone: UTC+02:00 (EET)
  - Summer (DST): UTC+03:00 (EEST)
- License plate: BH
- Website: www.vidin.government.bg

Vidin Province (Bulgarian: Област Видин) is the northwesternmost province of Bulgaria. It borders Serbia to the west and Romania to the northeast, and its administrative centre is the city of Vidin on the Danube river. The area is divided into 11 municipalities. As of 2023, the province had a population of 72,754.

There are remains of many castles, including Baba Vida, one of the last Bulgarian strongholds during the Ottoman invasion and the Belogradchik fortress.

== Municipalities ==
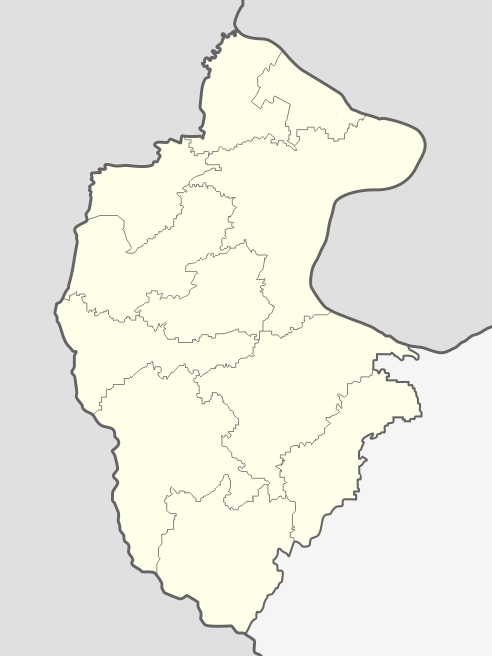

The Vidin Province contains 11 municipalities (singular: община, obshtina - plural: общини, obshtini). The following table shows the names of each municipality in English and Cyrillic, the main town (in bold) or village, and the population of each as of December 2009.

Municipality	Cyrillic	Pop.	Town/Village	Pop.
Belogradchik	Белоградчик	7,045	**Belogradchik**	5,334
Boynitsa	Бойница	1,717	Boynitsa	595
Bregovo	Брегово	6,168	**Bregovo**	2,592
Vidin	Видин	66,126	**Vidin**	49,471
Gramada	Грамада	2,384	**Gramada**	1,647
Dimovo	Димово	7,175	**Dimovo**	1,211
Kula	Кула	4,958	**Kula**	3,287
Makresh	Макреш	1,938	Makresh	473
Novo Selo	Ново Село	3,381	Novo Selo	1,144
Ruzhintsi	Ружинци	4,890	Ruzhintsi	915
Chuprene	Чупрене	2,285	Chuprene	576

== Geography ==
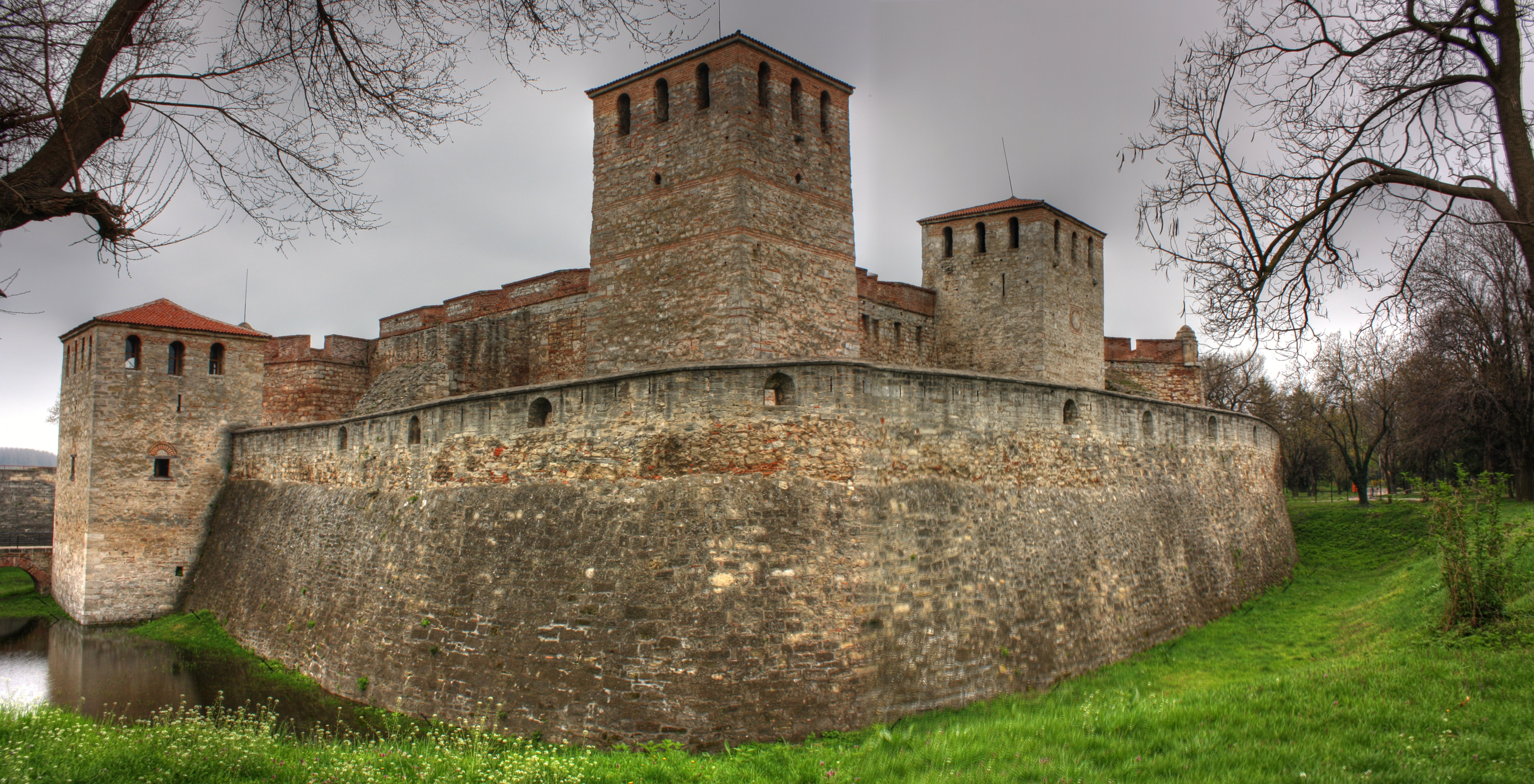
Baba Vida fortress in Vidin

The territory of the province includes the most western parts of the Danubian Plain and Stara Planina, while the Danube forms the border with Romania. The slopes of Stara Planina are covered with dense forests, lush meadows and boasts the majestic rock phenomena, the Belogradchik Rocks. There are around 80 caves situated close to the border with Serbia, the most famous being the Magura Cave, which known with its cave painting from 10,000 BC. There is also a lake in the proximity of the cave.

== Demographics ==
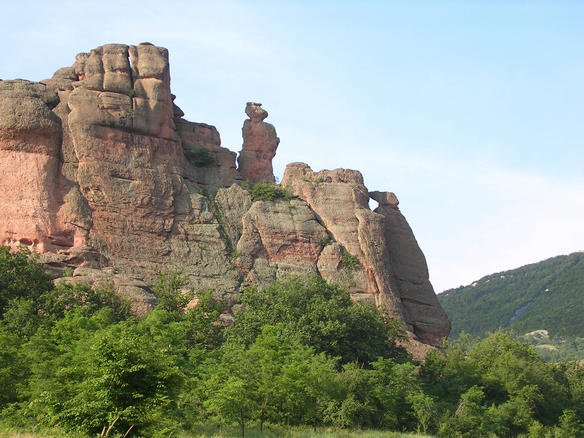
The Belogradchik Rocks

Historical population
Year	Pop.	±%
1946	194,007	—
1956	188,518	−2.8%
1965	179,429	−4.8%
1975	176,761	−1.5%
1985	166,680	−5.7%
1992	151,636	−9.0%
2001	130,074	−14.2%
2011	101,018	−22.3%
2021	75,408	−25.4%
Source: pop-stat.mashke.org

The Vidin province had a population of 130,074 according to a 2001 census, of which 48.4% were male and 51.6% were female.

As of the end of 2009, the population of the province, announced by the Bulgarian National Statistical Institute, numbered 108,067 of which 32.6% are inhabitants aged over 60 years.

Vidin is the oldest province in Bulgaria, with 28.9% of its population 65 years or older at the end of 2016. There is a big difference between the percentage elderly living in urban and rural areas: in urban areas 21.1% of the population is 65 years or older while that percentage is 42.8% in rural areas. The percentage of children up to 15 years is 13.5% in urban areas and only 9.8% in rural areas.

=== Ethnic groups ===
Ethnic groups in Vidin Province (2011 census)
Ethnic group	Percentage
Bulgarians	91.2%
Romani	7.7%
Others and indefinable	1.1%

Total population (2011 census): 101,018

Ethnic groups (2011 census): Identified themselves: 95,126 persons:

- Bulgarians: 86,802 (91.25%)
- Romani: 7,282 (7.66%)
- Others and indefinable: 1,042 (1.10 %)

=== Religion ===
Religions in Vidin Province (2001 census)
Religious group	Percentage
Orthodox Christian	96.1%
Protestant Christian	0.3%
Roman Catholic Christian	0.1%
Muslim	0.1%
Others and indefinable	3.3%

Religious adherence in the province according to 2001 census:

Census 2001
religious adherence	population	%
Orthodox Christians	125,063	96.15%
Protestants	397	0.31%
Roman Catholics	143	0.11%
Muslims	139	0.11%
Other	602	0.46%
Religion not mentioned	3,730	2.87%
Total	130,074	100%

== Towns and villages ==
The place names in bold have the status of town (in Bulgarian: град, transliterated as grad). Other localities have the status of village (in Bulgarian: село, transliterated as selo). The names of localities are transliterated in Latin alphabet followed in parentheses by the original name in Bulgarian Cyrillic alphabet (which links to the corresponding Bulgarian Wikipedia article).

=== Belogradchik Municipality ===
The Belogradchik municipality has one town (in bold) and 17 villages:

- **Belogradchik** (Белоградчик)
- Borovitsa (Боровица)
- Veshtitsa (Вещица)
- Varba (Върба)
- Granitovo (Гранитово)
- Granichak (Граничак)
- Dabravka (Дъбравка)
- Krachimir (Крачимир)
- Oshane (Ошане)
- Prauzhda (Праужда)
- Prolaznitsa (Пролазница)
- Rabisha (Рабиша)
- Rayanovtsi (Раяновци)
- Salash (Салаш)
- Slivovnik (Сливовник)
- Stakevtsi (Стакевци)
- Struindol (Струиндол)
- Chiflik (Чифлик)

=== Boynitsa Municipality ===
The Boynitsa municipality has 9 villages:

- Boynitsa (Бойница)
- Borilovets (Бориловец)
- Gradskovski kolibi (Градсковски колиби)
- Halovski kolibi (Халовски колиби)
- Kanits (Каниц)
- Perilovets (Периловец)
- Rabrovo (Раброво)
- Shipkova mahala (Шипикова махала)
- Shishentsi (Шишенци)

=== Bregovo Municipality ===
The Bregovo municipality has one town (in bold) and 9 villages:

- **Bregovo** (Брегово)
- Baley (Балей)
- Vrav (Връв)
- Gamzovo (Гъмзово)
- Deleyna (Делейна)
- Kalina (Калина)
- Kosovo (Косово)
- Kudelin (Куделин)
- Rakitnitsa (Ракитница)
- Tiyanovtsi (Тияновци)

=== Vidin Municipality ===
The Vidin municipality has two towns (in bold) and 33 villages:

- Akatsievo (Акациево)
- Antimovo (Антимово)
- Bela Rada (Бела Рада)
- Botevo (Ботево)
- Bukovets (Буковец)
- **Vidin** (Видин)
- Voinitsa (Войница)
- Vartop (Въртоп)
- Gaytantsi (Гайтанци)
- General Marinovo (Генерал Мариново)
- Gomotartsi (Гомотарци)
- Gradets (Градец)
- Dinkovitsa (Динковица)
- Dolni Boshnyak (Долни Бошняк)
- Druzhba (Дружба)
- **Dunavtsi** (Дунавци)
- Zheglitsa (Жеглица)
- Ivanovtsi (Ивановци)
- Inovo (Иново)
- Kalenik (Каленик)
- Kapitanovtsi (Капитановци)
- Koshava (Кошава)
- Kutovo (Кутово)
- Mayor Uzunovo (Майор Узуново)
- Novoseltsi (Новоселци)
- Peshakovo (Пешаково)
- Plakuder (Плакудер)
- Pokrayna (Покрайна)
- Ruptsi (Рупци)
- Tsar Simeonovo (Цар Симеоново)
- Sinagovtsi (Синаговци)
- Slana bara (Слана бара)
- Slanotran (Сланотрън)
- Tarnyane (Търняне)

=== Gramada Municipality ===
The Gramada municipality has one town (in bold) and 7 villages:

- Boyanovo (Бояново)
- Brankovtsi (Бранковци)
- Vodna (Водна)
- **Gramada** (Грамада)
- Medeshevtsi (Медешевци)
- Milchina laka (Милчина лъка)
- Sratsimirovo (Срацимирово)
- Toshevtsi (Тошевци)

=== Dimovo Municipality ===
The Dimovo municipality has one town (in bold) and 22 villages:

- Archar (Арчар)
- Bela (Бела)
- Vladichentsi (Владиченци)
- Vodnyantsi (Воднянци)
- Varbovchets (Върбовчец)
- Oreshets (Орешец)
- **Dimovo** (Димово)
- Dalgo pole (Дълго поле)
- Darzhanitsa (Държаница)
- Izvor (Извор)
- Karbintsi (Карбинци)
- Kladorub (Кладоруб)
- Kostichovtsi (Костичовци)
- Lagoshevtsi (Лагошевци)
- Mali Drenovets (Мали Дреновец)
- Medovnitsa (Медовница)
- Gara Oreshets (Гара Орешец)
- Ostrokaptsi (Острокапци)
- Septemvriytsi (Септемврийци)
- Smolya (Скомля)
- Shipot (Шипот)
- Yanyovets (Яньовец)
- Yarlovitsa (Ярловица)

=== Kula Municipality ===
The Kula municipality has one town (in bold) and 8 villages:

- Golemanovo (Големаново)
- Izvor mahala (Извор махала)
- Kosta Perchevo (Коста Перчево)
- **Kula** (Кула)
- Poletkovtsi (Полетковци)
- Staropatitsa (Старопатица)
- Topolovets (Тополовец)
- Tsar Petrovo (Цар-Петрово)
- Chichil (Чичил)

=== Makresh Municipality ===
The Makresh municipality has 7 villages:

- Valchek (Вълчек)
- Kireevo (Киреево)
- Makresh (Макреш)
- Podgore (Подгоре)
- Rakovitsa (Раковица)
- Tolovitsa (Толовица)
- Tsar Shishmanovo (Цар Шишманово)

=== Novo Selo ===
The Novo Selo municipality has 5 villages:

- Vinarovo (Винарово)
- Negovanovtsi (Неговановци)
- Novo Selo (Ново село)
- Florentin (Флорентин)
- Yasen (Ясен)

=== Ruzhintsi Municipality ===
The Ruzhintsi municipality has 10 villages:

- Belo pole (Бело поле)
- Gyurgich (Гюргич)
- Dinkovo (Динково)
- Drazhintsi (Дражинци)
- Drenovets (Дреновец)
- Pleshivets (Плешивец)
- Roglets (Роглец)
- Ruzhintsi (Ружинци)
- Topolovets (Тополовец)
- Cherno pole (Черно поле)

=== Chuprene Municipality ===
The Chuprene municipality has 9 villages:

- Bostanite (Бостаните)
- Varbovo (Върбово)
- Gorni Lom (Горни Лом)
- Dolni Lom (Долни Лом)
- Protopopintsi (Протопопинци)
- Replyana (Репляна)
- Sredogriv (Средогрив)
- Targovishte (Търговище)
- Chuprene (Чупрене)

== See also ==
- Provinces of Bulgaria
- List of villages in Vidin Province
