= Belogradchik Observatory =

Astronomical observatory in Bulgaria

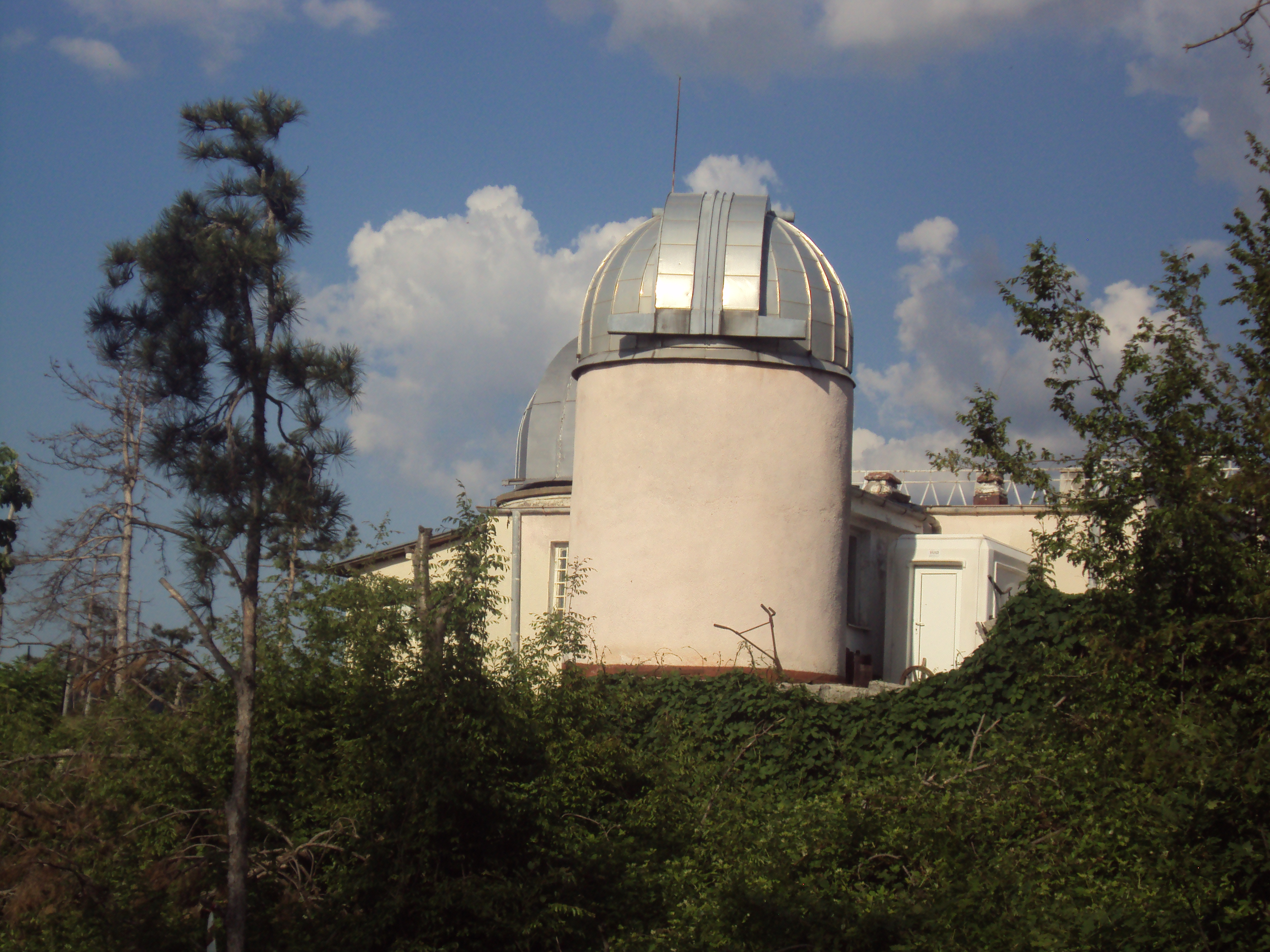
- Organization: Institute of Astronomy, BAS
- Location: Belogradchik, Bulgaria
- Coordinates: 43°37′22″N 22°40′30″E
- Altitude: 650 m (2,130 ft)
- Established: 1961 / 1965
- Website: www.astro.bas.bg/~aobel/

Telescopes
- Zeiss telescope: 60 cm Cassegrain reflector
- Celestron telescope: 14 inch (36 cm) Schmidt-Cassegrain reflector
- Zeiss telescope: 15 cm Cassegrain reflector
- Related media on Commons

The Astronomical Observatory of Belogradchik or Belogradchik Observatory is an astronomical observatory owned and operated by the Institute of Astronomy of the Bulgarian Academy of Sciences. It is located near the town of Belogradchik in northwestern Bulgaria, at the foot of the Western Balkan Mountains. The other observatory operated by the same institute is the Rozhen Observatory.

== History ==
Built in 1961 by a group of astronomy enthusiasts led by high school physics teacher and later chief assistant professor in Sofia University Hristo Kostov (1932-1982), Belogradchik Observatory became the first school observatory in Bulgaria. Official opening ceremony was held on 21.06.1965, by its first director Dr. Alexander Tomov (1930-2009), and was attended by much of Bulgarian leading astronomers - Acad. Nikola Bonev (1898-1979), Prof. Malina Popova (1922-2011), Prof. Tsvetan Bonchev, Assoc. Prof. Bogomil Kovachev, and already Chief Assist. Prof. Hristo Kostov. From 1964 till 1974 it was used as an auxiliary observational base for tracking Soviet satellites amidst the Space Race era. In the late 1960s additional working studies were built, adjacent to the lecture-hall and the dome. During his serve time as a director (1964-1988) Dr. Tomov referred to the Soviet experience in developing the infrastructure of the observatory, and implemented much of the methods of the Soviet astronomy school. Notable examples of cooperation are those with Acad. B.A. Vorontsov-Velyaminov (1904-1994) (see also Morphological Catalogue of Galaxies and Catalogue of Interacting Galaxies), Prof. A. Masevich (1918-2008), Dr. I. Karachentsev (b.1940), among other members of Sternberg Astronomical Institute (ГАИШ) and Soviet Academy of Sciences (AН СССР). In 1976 the Bulgarian Academy of Sciences took over operation. Since then the observatory was used entirely for scientific research, in cooperation with astronomers from the Department of Astronomy at Faculty of Physics of Sofia University and members of foreign institutes. By the time the Institute of Astronomy became a separate structure of the Academy in 1995, the observatory saw a notable revival. During the 1990s and 2000s Assoc. Prof. Dr. Alexander Antov, a second long term director of the observatory, modernized both its residential and scientific facilities, including the addition of a smaller dome in 1994. Its current director is Assoc. Prof. Dr. Anton Strigachev. In July 2015 the observatory marked its 50 years of operation by hosting the X annual conference of the Bulgarian Astronomical Society (SAB).

== Equipment ==
The observatory started out with a single 15 cm Cassegrain telescope by Zeiss. Then in August 1969 it was replaced by a 60 cm Cassegrain telescope, mounted in the same 5 m dome of the previous one. Primary focal length is 2400 mm, while focal length at Cassegrain focus is 7500 mm, with a relative aperture of f/12.5. Field of view at Cassegrain focus is 20'. Main instrument also accommodates a smaller 110 mm refractor finder with a focal length of 750 mm and a field of view of 2 degrees. Between 1969 and 1980 it was the biggest telescope on the Balkans to be eclipsed by the 2 m RCC telescope of Rozhen Observatory, which held this title until 2007. The purchase of the telescope was worth 200 000 leva, an enormous value at that time. Both instruments were manufactured by the German Carl Zeiss AG. The connections established with the manufacturer later helped purchase and equip instruments for the Bulgarian National Rozhen Observatory, which also has a twin 60 cm Cassegrain telescope. Currently the 15 cm telescope is used for visitor demonstrations only. In 1994 another catadioptric telescope was added in a separate, smaller dome - a 14-inch (36 cm) Schmidt-Cassegrain model.

== Instrumentation ==
In 1973 the first Bulgarian single channel electro-photometer was constructed and mounted on the main instrument, operating in photon counting regime, using the UBV photometric system of filters and five diaphragms (0.5–5 mm). It was upgraded a couple of years later with an EMI-9789 QA photomultiplier. In 1997 the photometer's preamp-discriminator module was changed with a new one built in Ukraine. It is still used occasionally for bright stars. A ST-8 CCD camera was used between 1997 and 2008. Since 2008 the main 60 cm telescope is equipped with a CCD camera FLI PL-9000, manufactured by Finger Lakes Instrumentation (USA). It uses a KAF-09000 chip with a resolution of 3056 x 3056 px without binning, and a 16-bit ADC. The pixel size is 12 μm which gives, with this telescope, a scale of 0.330 arcsec/px without binning and 1.0 arcsec/px with binning 3 x 3. The field of view is 17' x 17'. BVRcIc Johnson-Cousins standard filters are used.

== Observations ==
At first the observatory has been used for satellite astrometry (1960s-1970s). Between 1964 and 1974 more than 1000 Soviet satellites were observed and data sent to Mission Control Centre in Moscow for orbit corrections. Later, during the 1970s and 1980s, Photo-electric surveys of more than 200 catalogue double and multiple galaxies (1970s-1980s) were carried out. Holmberg effect was used to confirm or rule out physical and visual systems (binaries and multiplets). Notable results were included in "A General Catalogue of Photoelectric Magnitudes and Colours in the UBV System of 3578 Galaxies, Brighter than the 16-th V Magnitude (1936-1982)" by G. Longo, Antoinette de Vaucouleurs and H.G. Corwin (1983) (see also Gérard de Vaucouleurs), with significant part of its data obtained from Belogradchik observatory. During the 1990s, beside fast stellar electro-photometry of variable stars, it was also a base for meticulous observations of minor bodies of the Solar System, including the famous Shoemaker-Levy 9 comet encounter with Jupiter in July 1994. In recent years Romanian astronomers have jointly used the observatory for an astrometry project, linked to the Gaia programme, prior to its launch in December 2013. It was by that time an automatic seismograph was mounted in an adjacent isolated compartment, where it serves both Romanian and Bulgarian seismologists. Current field of research involves CCD observations mainly of a long range of variable star types, as well as active galactic nuclei (AGN) - namely blazars. Observations are performed by researchers of several teams, as part of respective national and international scientific projects. Through the years Belogradchik Observatory saw cooperation and conducted simultaneous observations with similar facilities in Ukraine (Crimean Astrophysical Observatory), Russia (Terskol Observatory (Caucasus)), Armenia (Byurakan Observatory), Greece (Skinakas Observatory (Crete), and Chelmos Observatory (Peloponnese)), Serbia, Romania, Slovakia (Skalnaté pleso Observatory (Tatry)), Czech Republic (Ondřejov Observatory), Poland (Toruń Observatory), Germany, France, and India, among others. Simultaneous observations with Rozhen Observatory are also regularly carried out. Observational time is managed and distributed by a specialized time allocation committee of the institute.

== See also ==
- List of astronomical observatories
- Category:Astronomical observatories by country
- Category:Astronomical observatories in Bulgaria
