= Belogradchik =

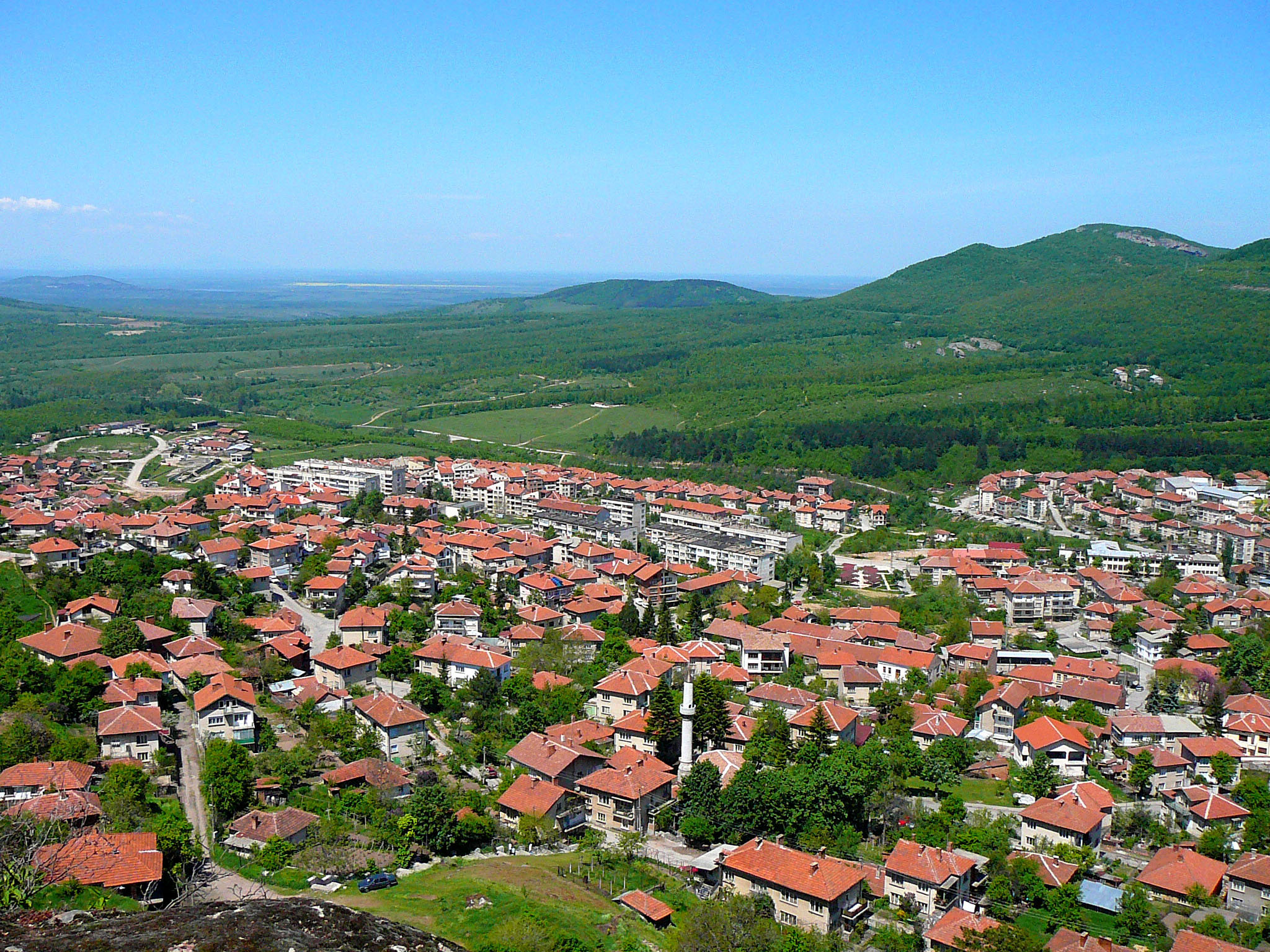

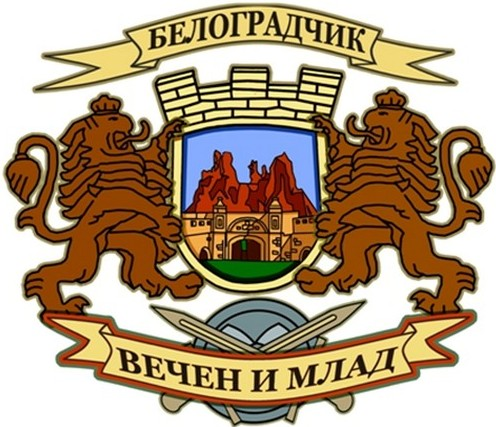
- Coat of arms

- Location of Belogradchik
- Coordinates: 43°37′N 22°41′E
- Country: Bulgaria
- Provinces (Oblast): Vidin

Government
  - Mayor: Boyan Minkov
- Elevation: 522 m (1,713 ft)

Population (2024)
  - Total: 4,601
- Time zone: UTC+2 (EET)
  - Summer (DST): UTC+3 (EEST)
- Postal Code: 3900
- Area code: 0936

Belogradchik (Bulgarian: Белоградчик, lit. 'Small White Town'; pronounced [bɛɫoɡrɐtˈt͡ʃik]) is a town in Vidin Province, northwestern Bulgaria, and is the administrative centre of the homonymous municipality. The town is situated in the foothills of the Balkan Mountains just east of the Serbian border and about 50 km south of the Danube River. The town is close to the Belogradchik Rocks, which are major tourist attraction. As of 2024, it had a population of 4,601.

== Geography ==
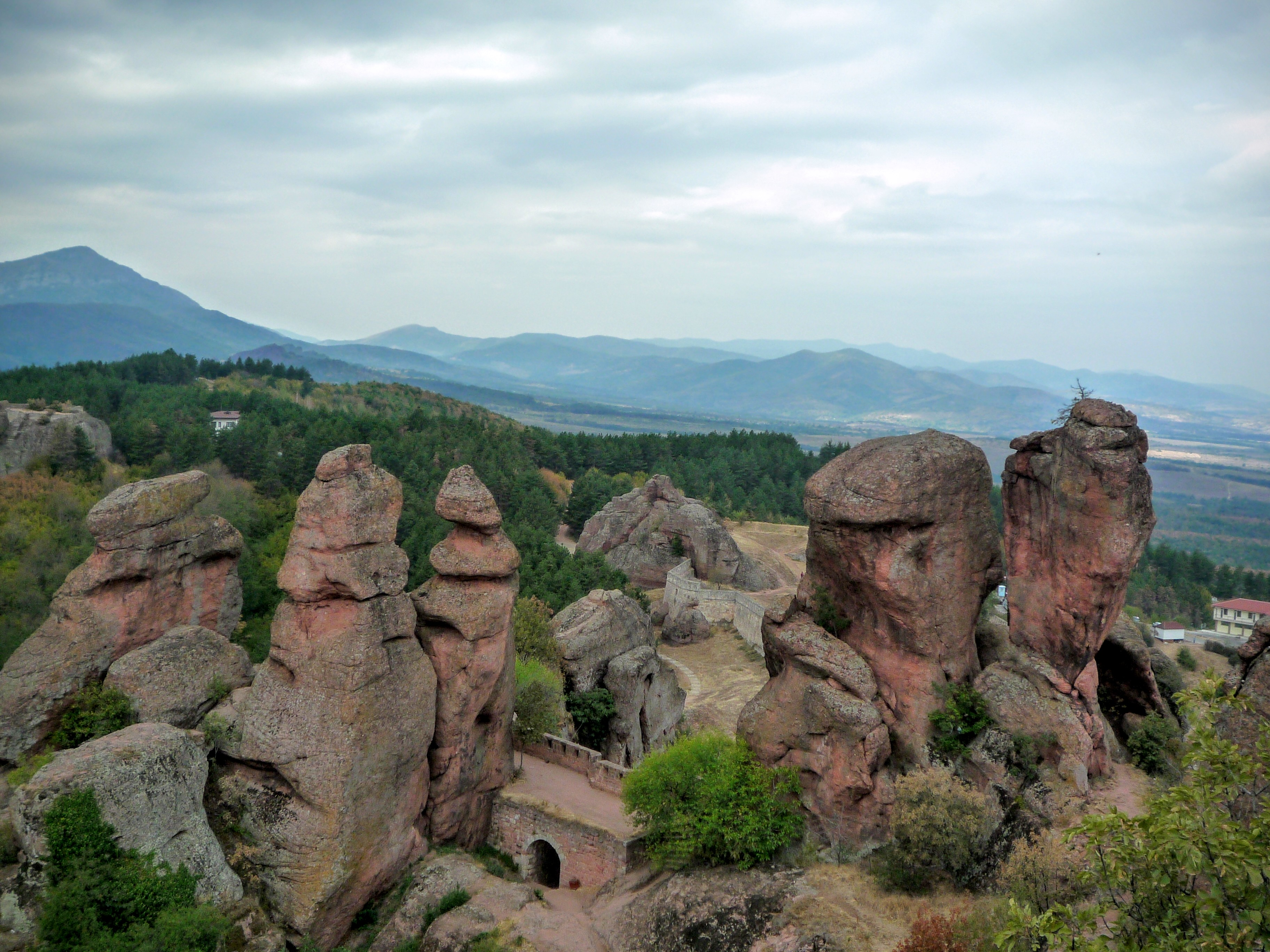
Belogradchik Rocks at the town

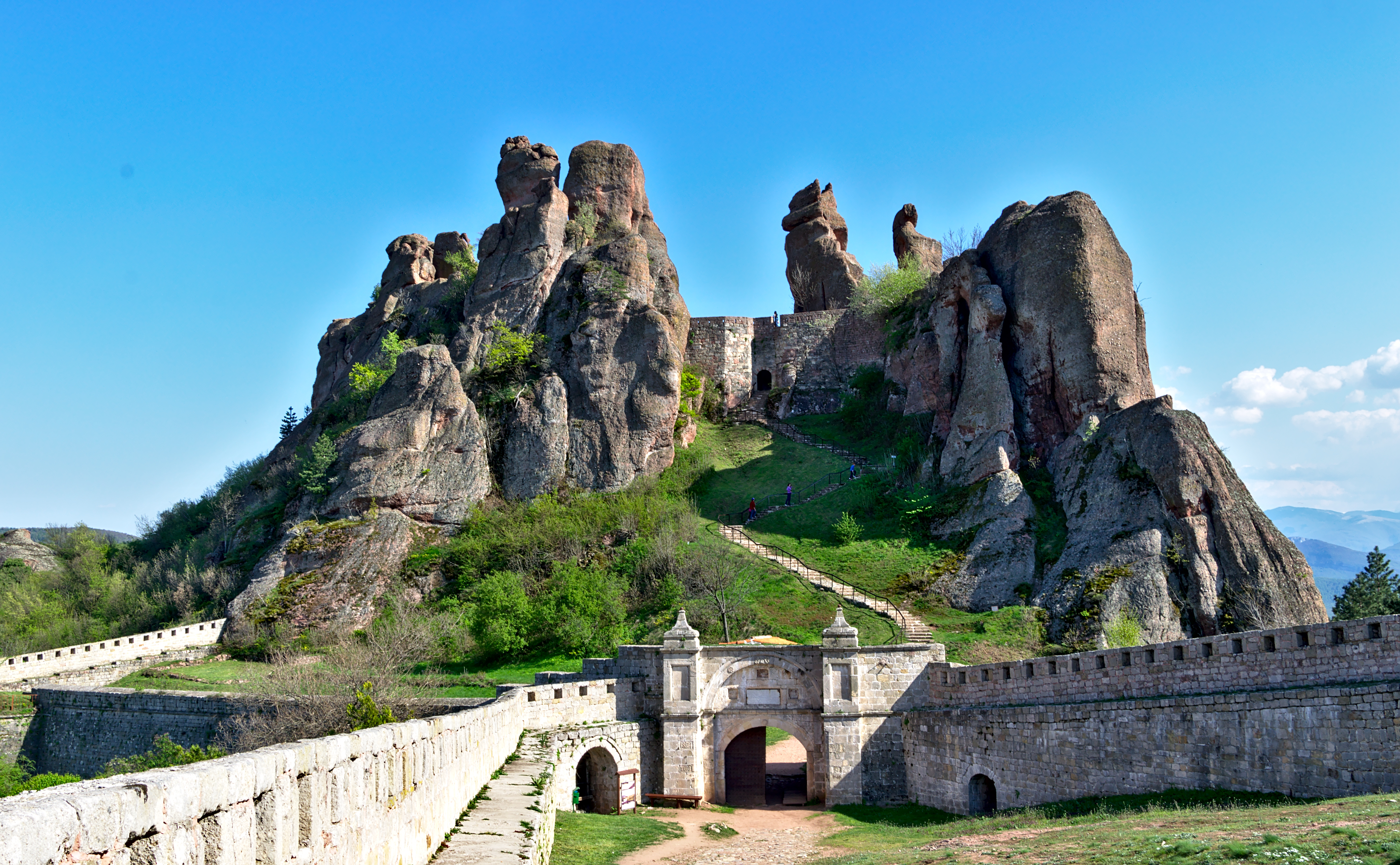
Entrance of the Belogradchik Fortress

Belogradchik is situated at an altitude of 520 m in the western part of the Fore-Balkan, a mountainous chain straddling north of and in parallel with the Balkan Mountains. The town lies next to the Belogradchik Rocks, a major rock formation reaching some 30 km in length that contains outcrops reaches up to 100 m in height, which form a dramatic outline of the town. Close to the town is the source of the Gradska reka, a tributary of the Salashka reka, itself a tributary of the Archar of the Danube drainage.

Belogradchik falls within the temperate continental climatic zone, moderated by the surrounding elevations, which makes the mean annual temperatures higher in comparison with settlements at the same altitude; the average January temperature is −1.4 °C, while in July it is 21.6 °C. The predominant winds are northwestern, northern and western. The annual precipitation reaches 673 mm, with a maximum in January (79 mm) and a minimum in February (32 mm). Snow cover lasts for about 60 days.

The closest major road is the first class I-1 road a few kilometers to the northeast; in parallel to the I-1 is being constructed the Botevgrad-Vidin expressway. Several road radiate from Belogradchik leading to neighbouring villages. The closest railway station is at Gara Oreshets on the railway line No. 7 Mezdra−Vidin at a distance of 12 km. The distance to the provincial center Vidin is 55 km; the distance to the town of Montana is 70 km.

== History ==
The region of Belogradchik has been inhabited by humans for over 1 million years. The Kozarnika Cave, located some 6 km north of the town, was used as a hunters' shelter as early as the Lower Paleolithic (1.6–1.4 million BP) and keeps some of the earliest evidence of human symbolic behaviour, as well as the earliest European Gravette flint assemblages. There was a Roman castrum at Belogradchik. During the middle ages the town was part of the First and Second Bulgarian Empires. In the late 14th or early 15th century the settlement was conquered by the Ottomans as a result of the Bulgarian–Ottoman wars. It was mentioned in Ottoman registers of 1454–1455 and by 1560 it was the center of a nahiyah, a regional administrative division. During the Bulgarian National Revival the local population founded a monastery school in 1821. During the Uprising in Northwestern Bulgaria of 1850 the Bulgarian rebels besieged the Ottoman garrison of the Belogradchik Fortress but were defeated by Ottoman reinforcements. On 25 February 1878 the town was liberated as a result of the Russo-Turkish War of 1877–1878 and joined the reestablished Bulgarian state. During the Serbo-Bulgarian War of 1885 the Serbs were defeated while trying unsuccessfully to capture Belogradchik.

== Demography ==
Historical population
Year	Pop.	±%
1946	2,192	—
1956	3,444	+57.1%
1965	5,178	+50.3%
1975	6,898	+33.2%
1985	7,256	+5.2%
1992	6,635	−8.6%
2001	5,816	−12.3%
2011	5,173	−11.1%
2021	4,080	−21.1%
Source: pop-stat.mashke.org

The population of Belogradchik increased steadily until the 1980s, after which its growth is negative. According to the 2021 Bulgarian census the town had a population of 5,049, of which 3,825 identified as Bulgarians, 1,052 as Gypsies, 4 as Turks and 168 did not identify or did not respond. The predominant religion is Christianity with some 4,317 people. Most others did not respond, have no religion or could not determine a religion.

There are three schools, two kindergartens and a medical center.

== Economy ==
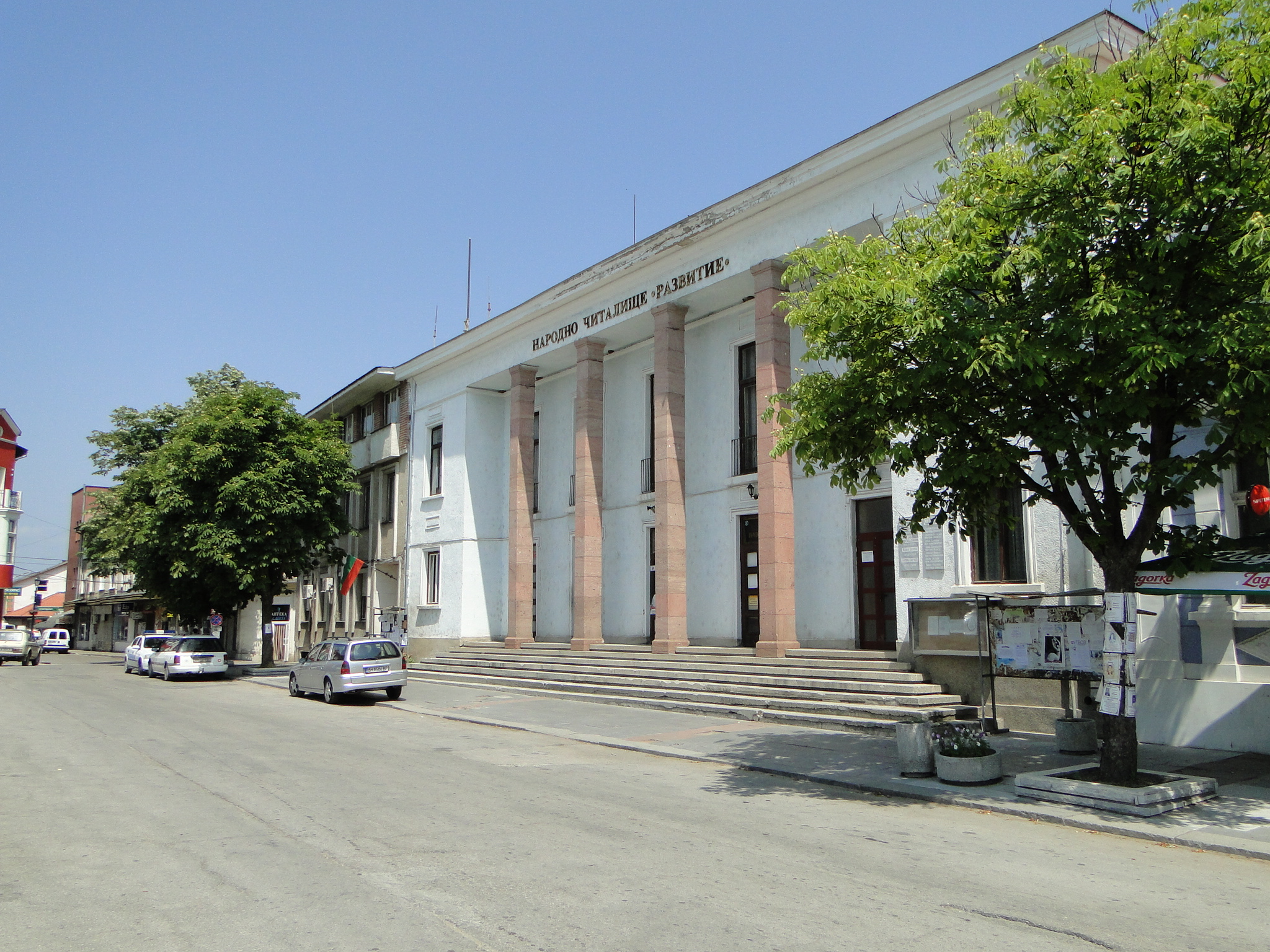
The chitalishte of Belogradchik

The main economic activity is tourism. There are several small factories. Agriculture and forestry are well-developed. The most important crops are grapes, orchards and raspberries. Livestock breeding is also prominent, mostly sheep and cattle. The Belogradchik Observatory is one of the two astronomical observatories operated by the Institute of Astronomy of the Bulgarian Academy of Sciences.

== Landmarks and tourism ==
The town is an important tourist destination. Its historical center includes Bulgarian National Revival architecture. Several of the local sites are included in the 100 Tourist Sites of Bulgaria. The Museum of History of Belogradchik is located in one of the preserved old houses and contains over 6,000 artifacts, covering local history, nature and art. The most important architectural landmark is the Belogradchik Fortress, which has some traces of the medieval Bulgarian fortification but its modern appearance dates from an early 19th century Ottoman renovation. Covering an area of 10,210 m^{2}, it is spectacularly located among the natural rock surroundings.

The most important landmarks are the Belogradchik Rocks, which consist for various groups of dramatically shaped sandstone and conglomerate rock formations spanning a territory of about 50 m^{2}. The rocks vary in colour from primarily red to yellow. They were included in the vote for the New 7 Wonders of Nature.

Another tourist attraction within the municipal borders is the Magura Cave near the village of Rabisha, containing cave paintings dated to 8000 BC. The site is included in the UNESCO's tentative list of World Heritage. Close to the cave is Lake Rabisha, the largest inland natural freshwater lake in Bulgaria.

== Gallery ==
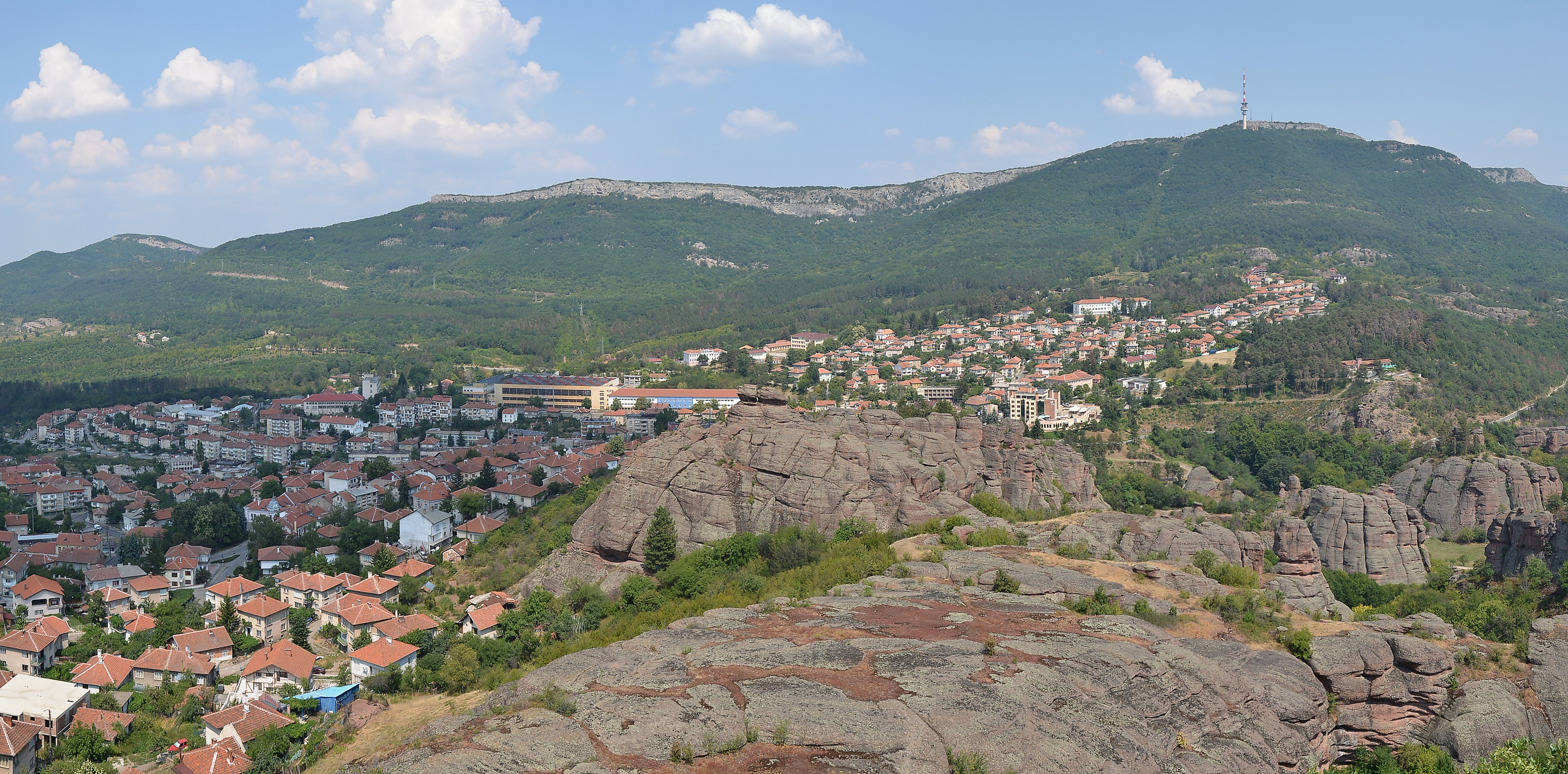
A view of the town

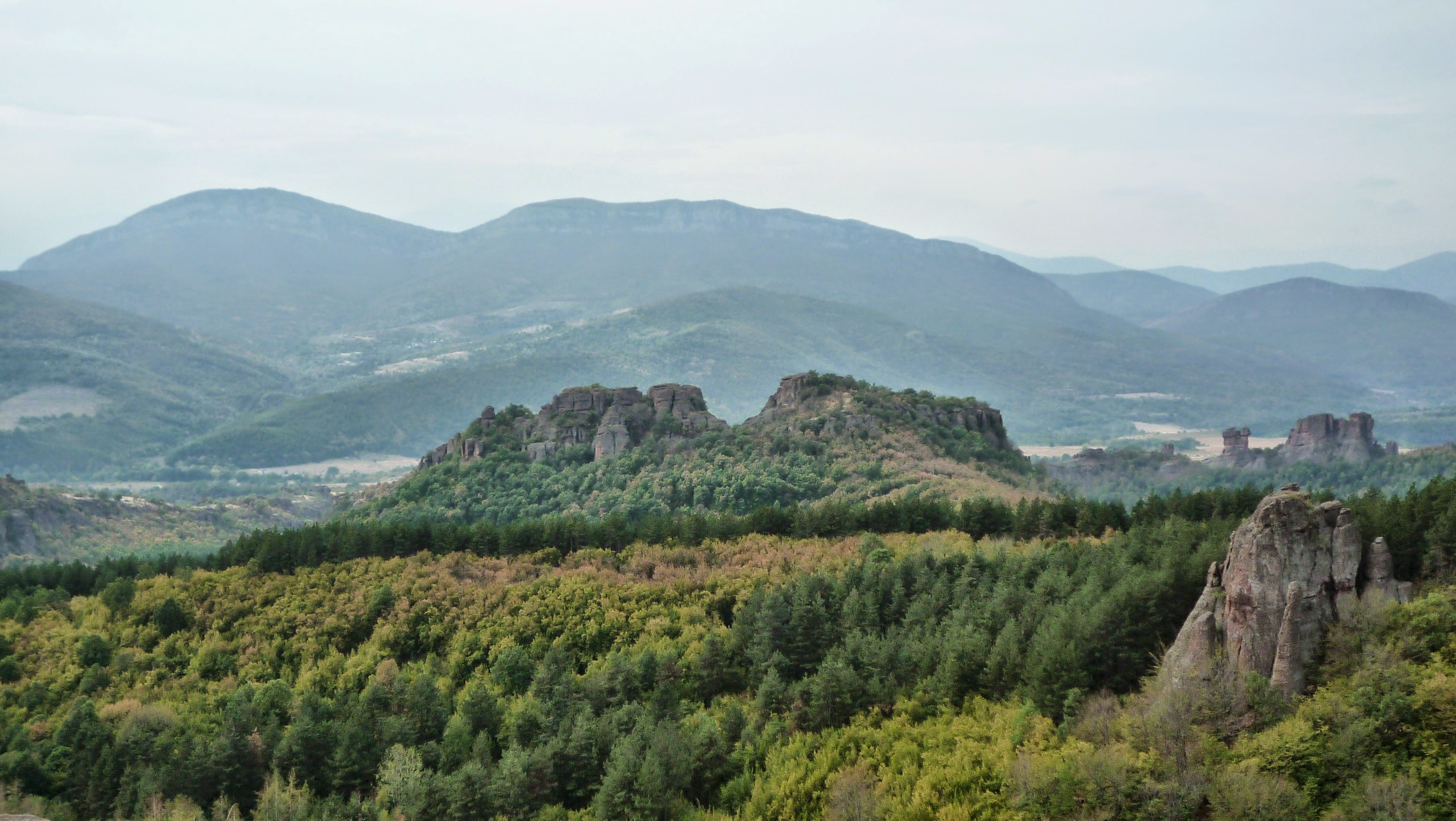
Panoramic view of the rocks

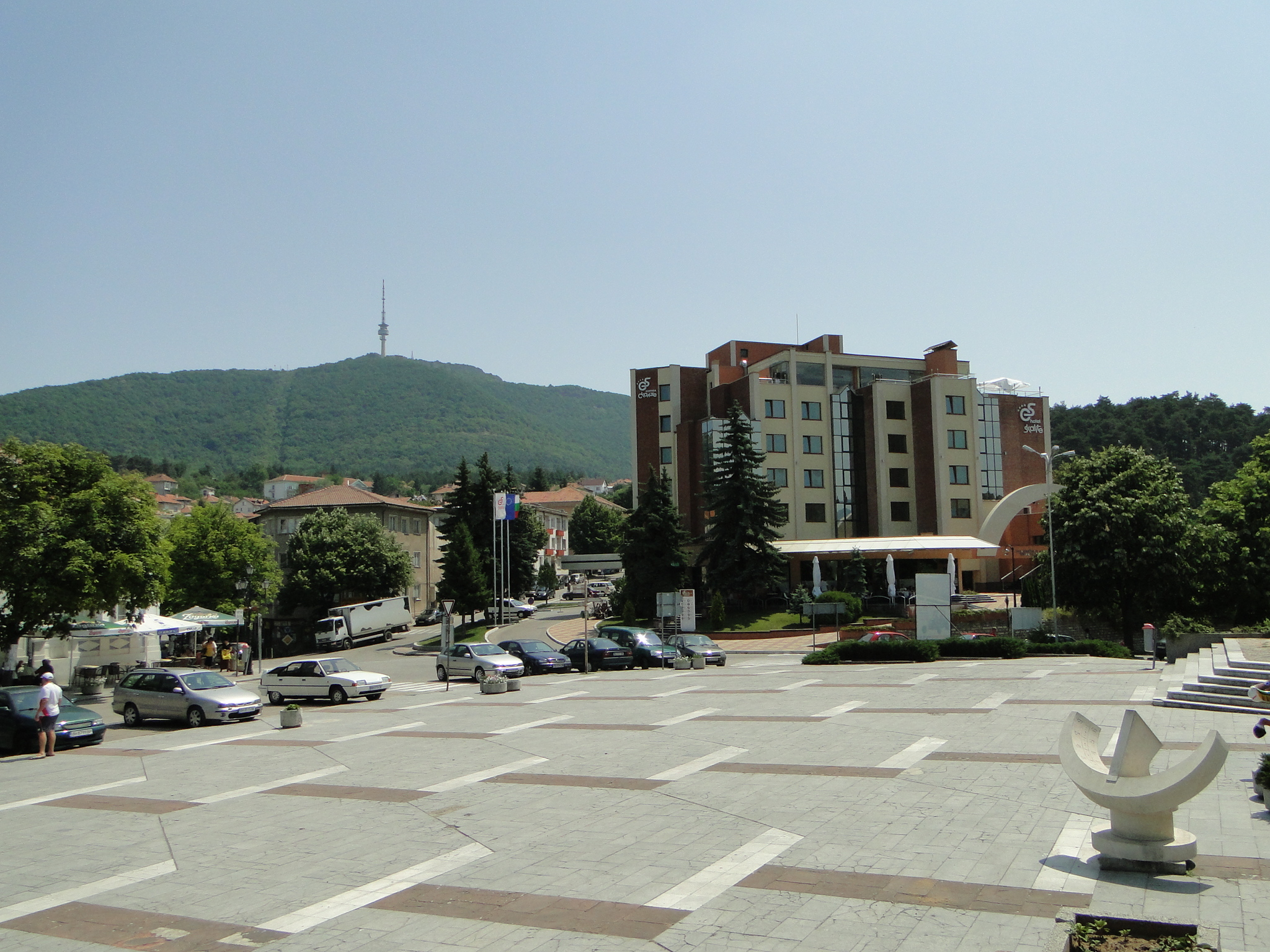
The central square
