= Makresh =

Makresh Макреш
- Location of Makresh
- Coordinates: 43°46′N 22°40′E
- Country: Bulgaria
- Provinces (Oblast): Vidin

Government
  - Mayor: Ivan Valchev
- Elevation: 194 m (636 ft)

Population (2008)
  - Total: 472
- Time zone: UTC+2 (EET)
  - Summer (DST): UTC+3 (EEST)
- Postal Code: 3850
- Area code: 09339

Makresh (Bulgarian: Макреш, pronounced [makrɛʃ]) is a village in northwestern Bulgaria, part of Vidin Province. It is the administrative centre of the homonymous Makresh Municipality, which lies in the western part of Vidin Province, close to the Bulgarian-Serbian border. Makresh is situated 35 kilometres from the provincial capital Vidin, in the westernmost Danubian Plain, with the western reaches of the Balkan Mountains to its west.

== Municipality ==
Makresh municipality has an area of 229 square kilometres includes the following 7 places:

- Kireevo
- Makresh
- Podgore
- Rakovitsa
- Tolovitsa
- Tsar Shishmanovo
- Valchek

Makresh municipality is mainly agricultural, growing wheat, barley, corn and rye. Sights in the area include the Rabisha Lake and the Rakovitsa Monastery dating to the 10th-11th century with the Holy Trinity Church.

== Honour ==
Makresh Rocks off Robert Island, South Shetland Islands are named after Makresh.
