= Kozarnika, Dimovo Municipality =

Cave and archaeological site in Bulgaria

Peshtera Kozarnika
- Пещера Козарника (Bulgarian)
- The Goat Shed
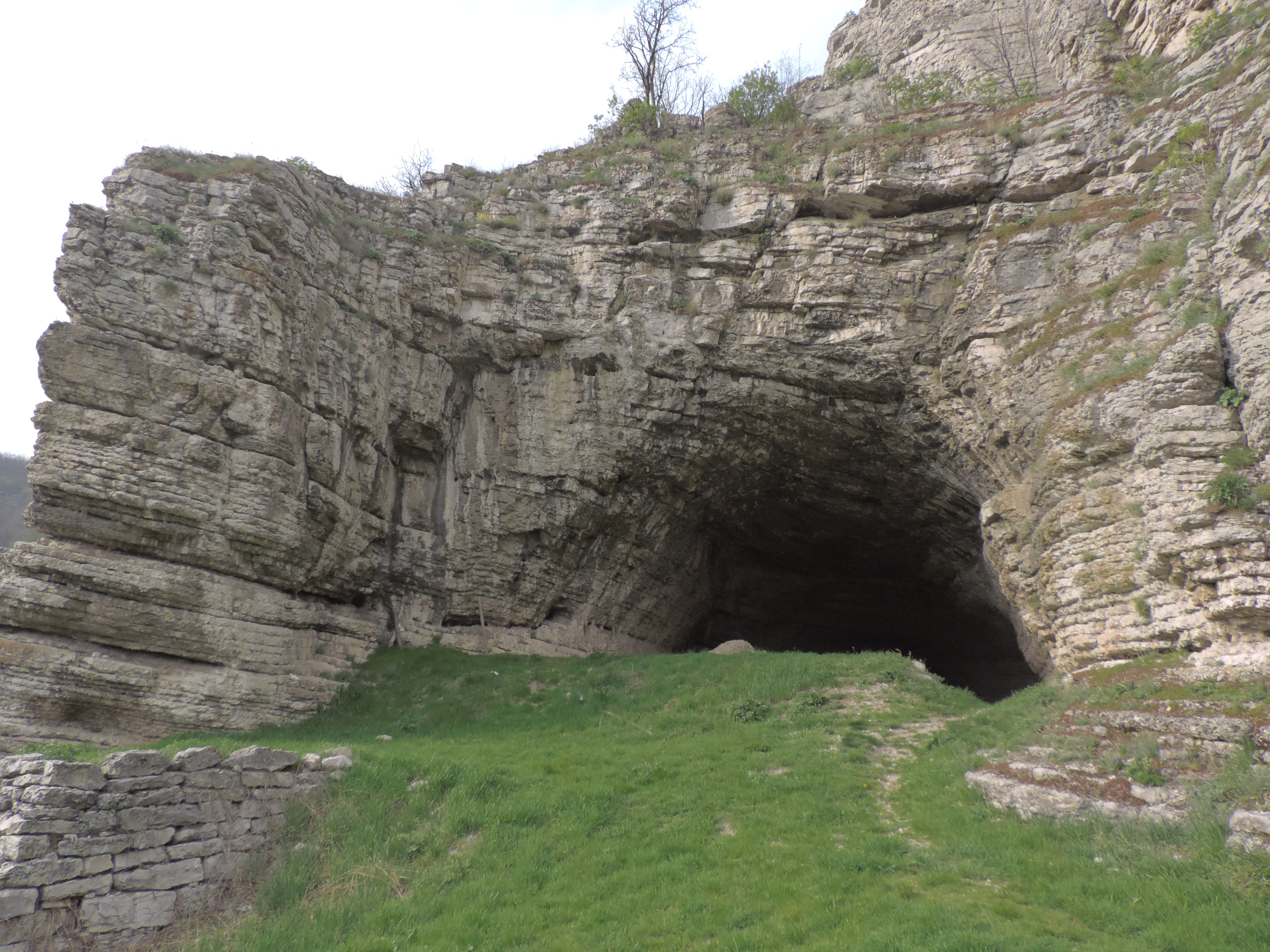
- The entrance of Kozarnika Cave

- location in Bulgaria
- 43°39′6.273″N 22°42′8.676″E
- Type: Cave
- Periods: Lower Paleolithic
- Associated with: Paleo-humans
- Location: near Belogradchik northwestern Bulgaria
- Region: Vidin Province

Site notes
- Material: limestone Karst
- Height: 85 m (279 ft)
- Length: 210 m (690 ft)
- Excavation dates: Since 1984
- Archaeologists: Nikolay Sirakov, Jean-Luc Guadelli

Kozarnika or Peshtera Kozarnika (Bulgarian: Пещера Козарника, lit. 'The Goat Shed') is a cave in northwestern Bulgaria that was used as a hunters’ shelter as early as the Lower Paleolithic (1.6-1.4 million BP). It marks an older route of early human migration from Africa to Europe via the Balkans, prior to the other currently suggested route - the one across Gibraltar. The cave probably keeps the earliest evidence of human symbolic behaviour and the earliest European Gravette flint assemblages came to light here.

Video at the entrance of the cave

Kozarnika cave is located 6 km (4 mi) from the town of Belogradchik in northwestern Bulgaria, on the northern slopes of the Balkan Mountains, close to the Danubian Plain. It is opened to the south, at 85 m (280 ft) above the valley. With its length of 210 m (690 ft), the cave is among the small-sized in the Belogradchick karst region. Studies over the course of two decades uncovered 21 geological layers there, containing (bottom to top) archaeological complexes of Early Lower Paleolithic (layers 13 - 11a), Middle Paleolithic (layers 10b - 9a), Early Upper Paleolithic (layer 6/7), a sequence of an original Paleolithic bladelets industry with backed pieces that scholars called Kozarnikian (layers 5c - 3a), Early Neolithic, Late Copper Age, Late Bronze Age, Medieval and Late medieval periods.

The Kozarnika cave project started in 1984. Since 1996, it has been headed by Dr. Prof. Nikolay Sirakov (Archaeological Institute and Museum of Bulgarian Academy of Sciences, Sofia, Bulgaria) and Dr. Jean-Luc Guadelli (IPGQ-UMR5199 of French National Center for Scientific Research, Bordeaux-France).

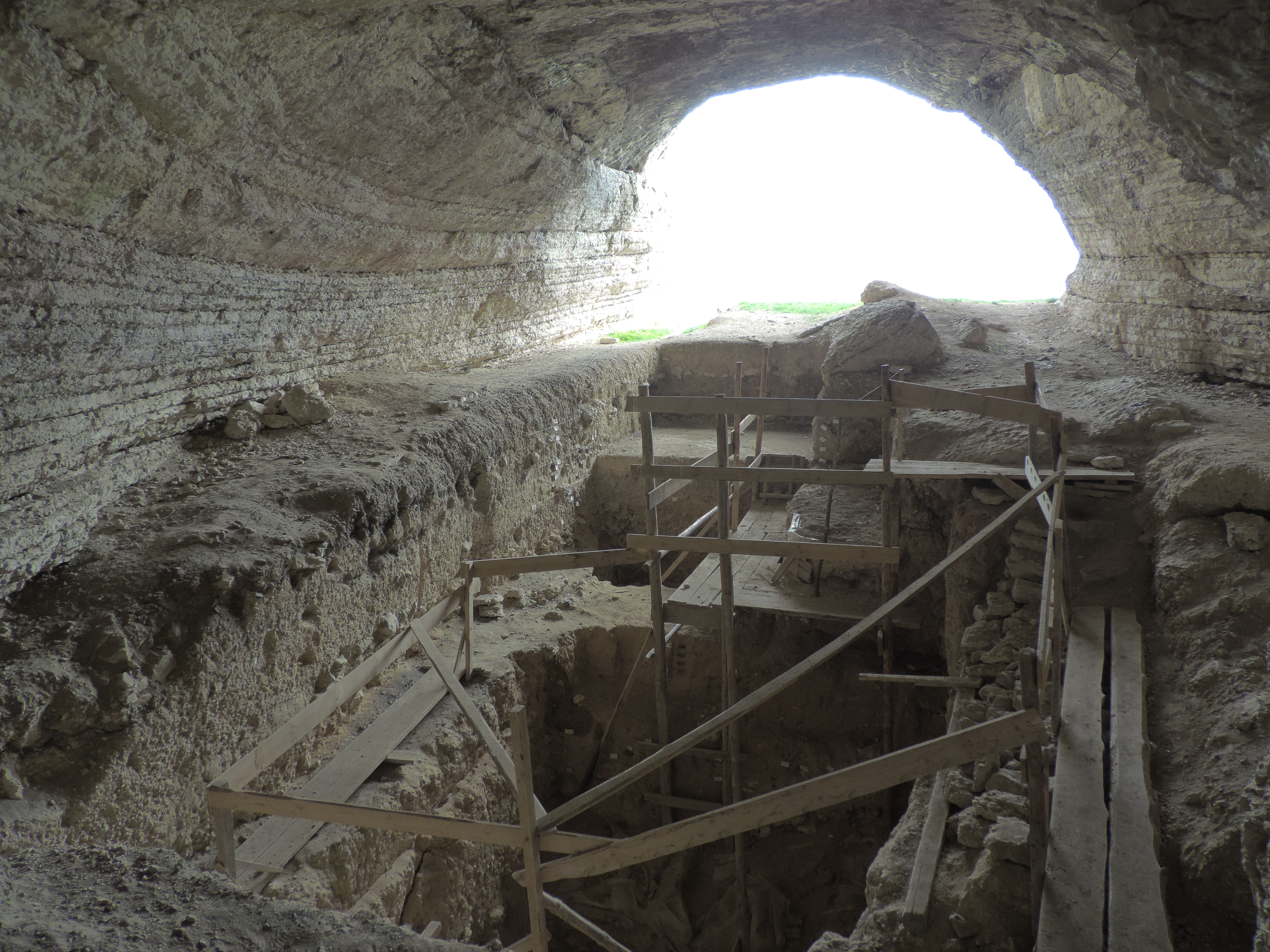
Archaeological excavations at the entrance

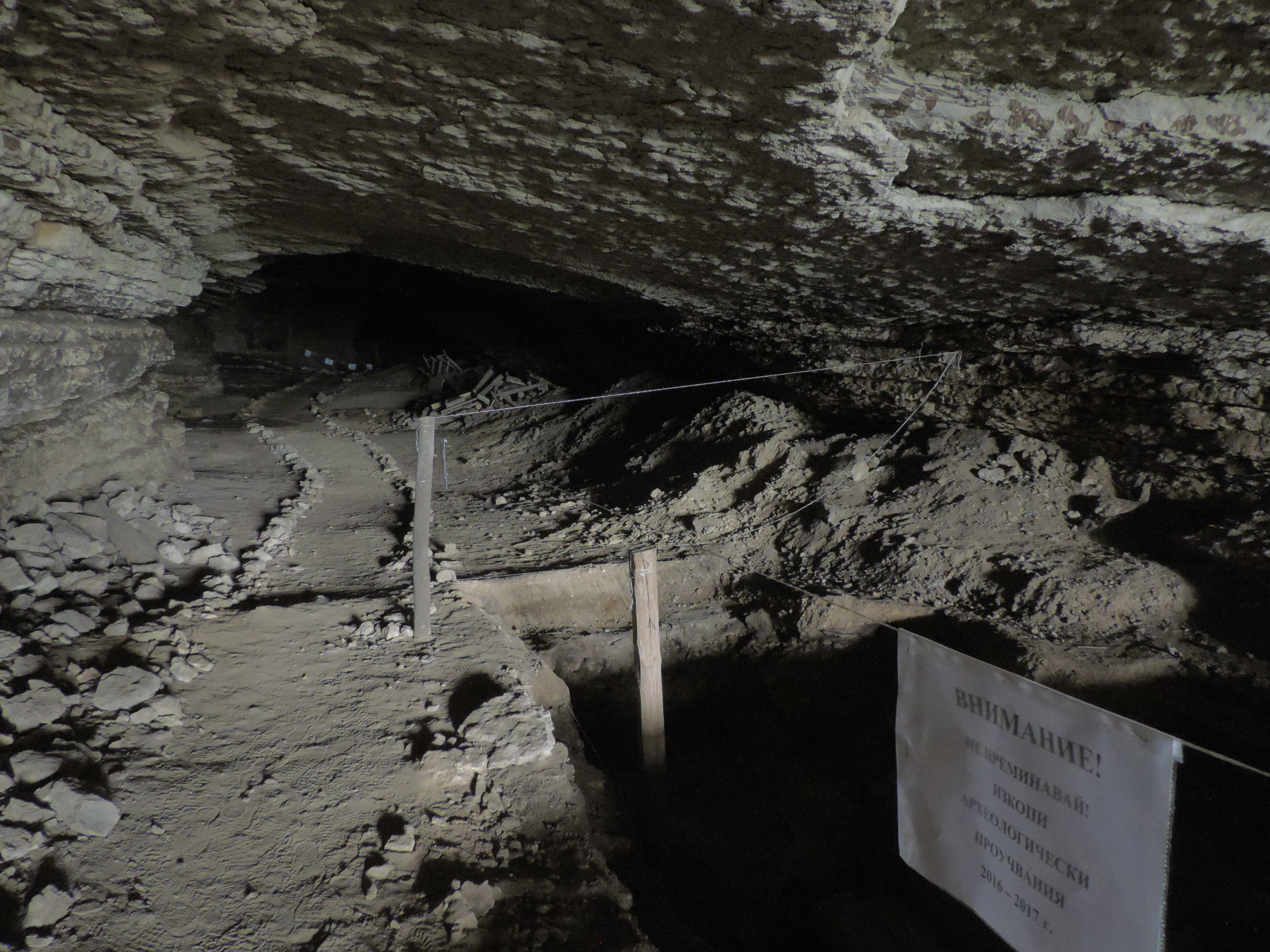
View to inside of the cave

In the ground layers, dated to 1.6–1.4 million BP (using palaeomagnetism, which determines age using past patterns of reversals in the Earth's magnetic field and analyses of both the microfauna and the macrofauna), archaeologists have discovered a human molar tooth (considered to be the earliest human—Homo erectus/Homo ergaster—traces discovered in Europe outside Caucasian region), lower palaeolithic assemblages that belong to a core-and-flake non-Acheulian industry, and incised bones that may be the earliest example of human symbolic behaviour.

The findings from Middle Paleolithic layers (East Balkan Levallois cores and side-scrapers as well as East Balkan Levallois and Le Moustier points), rather bifacial points, dating from 300,000–50,000 BP prove presence of hunters’ groups possibly of Homo neanderthalensis. Upper Paleolithic layers consist flint assemblages from the earliest European Gravette complex dating from 43,000 up to 39,000 BP belonging to Homo sapiens.

In fieldwork since 2015, researchers have started to investigate the nature and impact paleo-human presence had on local fauna in order to establish a more accurate chronology of the occupation periods. In this context the research team also attempts to get a better understanding on the relationship between the Campanian Ignimbrite Eruption and its consequences on human occupation in the Kozarnika cave.

== See also ==
- Magura Cave
- Bacho Kiro cave
- Sićevo Gorge
- Peștera cu Oase
- Vértesszőlős
- Campanian Ignimbrite Eruption
