= Lake Rabisha =

Lake in Belogradchik Municipality, Bulgaria

- Рабишко езеро (Bulgarian)
- Location within Bulgaria
- Location: Vidin Province
- Coordinates: 43.7386079°N 22.585659°E
- Type: natural
- Basin countries: Bulgaria
- Max. length: 2.2 km (1.4 mi)
- Max. width: 1.4 km (0.87 mi)
- Surface area: 3.25 km^{2} (1.25 sq mi)
- Average depth: 10 m (33 ft)
- Max. depth: 15 m (49 ft)

Lake Rabisha (Bulgarian: Рабишко езеро, Rabishko ezero) is the largest inland natural freshwater lake in Bulgaria. It is located in northwestern Bulgaria, between the villages of Rabisha and Tolovitsa in Belogradchik municipality, Vidin Province. The lake is abundant in fish. There are sheatfishes that can reach 300 kilograms of weight. The lake is near the famous 15 million years old Magura Cave, which is one of the largest caves in Bulgaria.

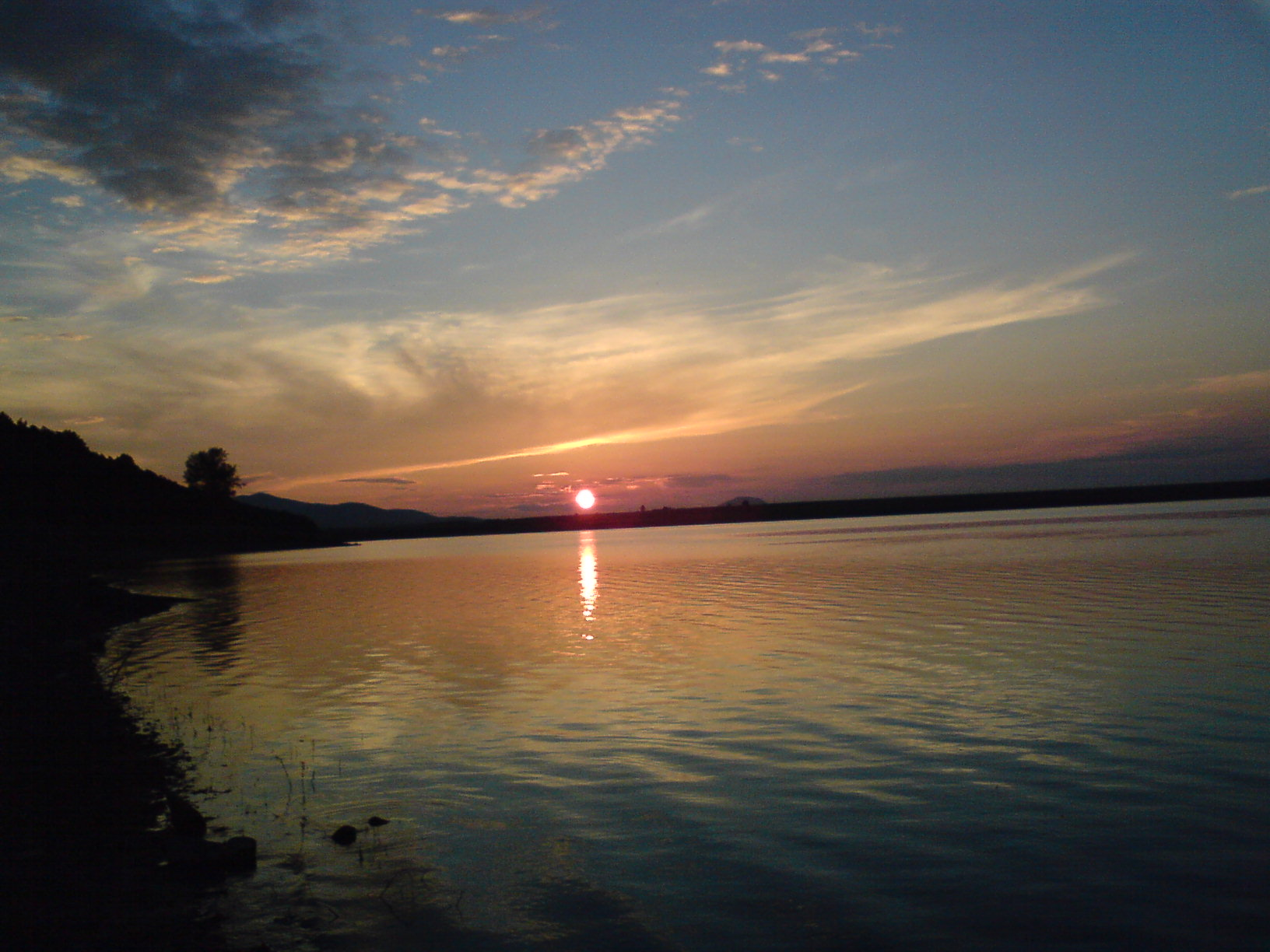
Sunset over the lake

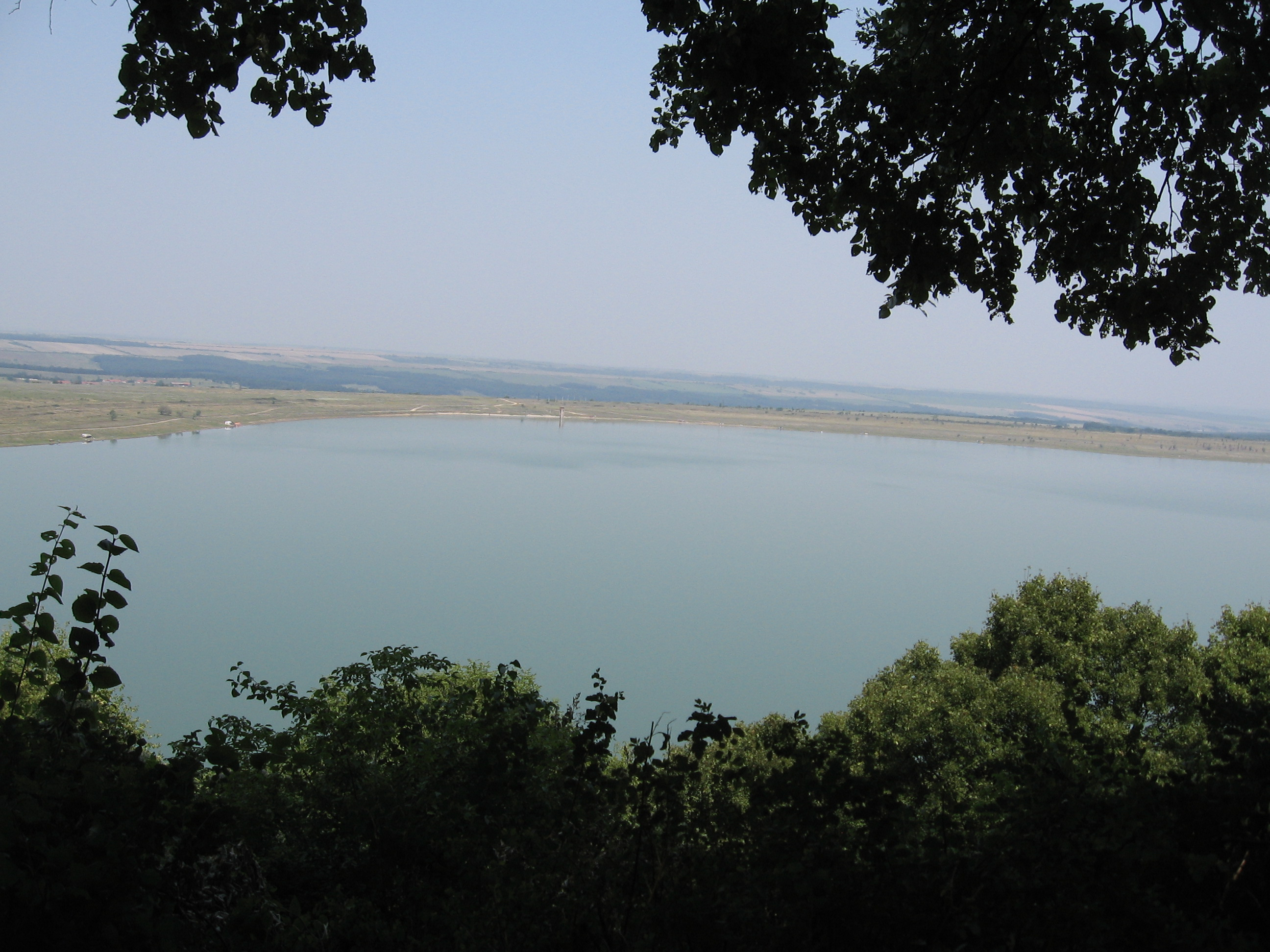
The Rabisha lake
