= Tolovitsa =

- Location of Tolovitsa
- Coordinates: 43°45′N 22°44′E
- Country: Bulgaria
- Provinces (Oblast): Vidin

Government
  - Mayor: Ivan Valchev
- Elevation: 289 m (948 ft)

Population (2008)
  - Total: 65
- Time zone: UTC+2 (EET)
  - Summer (DST): UTC+3 (EEST)
- Postal Code: 3854
- Area code: 09339

Tolovitsa (Bulgarian: Толовица) is a village in northwestern Bulgaria. It is in Vidin region and Makresh Municipality. It is one of the smallest villages in the region with only 65 inhabitants.

== Geography ==
The village is located near the Rabisha lake and the 15 million years old Magura cave. There are two rivers that flow near the village - "Tolovishka bara" and "Svadbitsa".
