= 6267 Rozhen =

Main-belt asteroid

Discovery
- Discovered by: E. W. Elst
- Discovery site: Rozhen Obs.
- Discovery date: 20 September 1987

Designations
- Named after: Rozhen Observatory (discovering observatory)
- Alternative designations: 1987 SO_{9} · 1971 SP; 1979 BR_{2}
- Minor planet category: main-belt · Flora

Orbital characteristics
- Epoch 4 September 2017 (JD 2458000.5)
- Uncertainty parameter 0
- Observation arc: 67.30 yr (24,583 days)
- Aphelion: 2.3582 AU
- Perihelion: 1.9663 AU
- Semi-major axis: 2.1623 AU
- Eccentricity: 0.0906
- Orbital period (sidereal): 3.18 yr (1,161 days)
- Mean anomaly: 72.417°
- Mean motion: 0° 18^{m} 36^{s} / day
- Inclination: 2.1034°
- Longitude of ascending node: 136.75°
- Argument of perihelion: 315.64°

Physical characteristics
- Dimensions: 3.02 km (calculated)
- Synodic rotation period: 3.980±0.020 h 3.9847±0.0007 h
- Geometric albedo: 0.24 (assumed)
- Spectral type: S
- Absolute magnitude (H): 14.270±0.120 (R) · 14.3 · 14.316±0.001 (R) · 14.77 · 14.79±0.28

6267 Rozhen, provisional designation 1987 SO_{9}, is a stony Florian asteroid from the inner regions of the asteroid belt, approximately 3 kilometers in diameter. In 1987, the asteroid was discovered by Eric Elst at Rozhen Observatory, Bulgaria, and was later named after the discovering observatory.

== Discovery ==
Rozhen was discovered on 20 September 1987, by Belgian astronomer Eric Elst at Rozhen Observatory near Smoljan, Bulgaria. For four days, between 27 and 31 January 2005, the body was briefly and erroneously renamed 6267 Smolyan. In November 1949, a precovery was taken at Palomar Observatory, extending the body's observation arc by 38 years prior to its official discovery observation at Rozhen.

== Orbit and classification ==
The S-type asteroid is a member of the Flora family, one of the largest groups of stony asteroids in the main-belt. It orbits the Sun in the inner main-belt at a distance of 2.0–2.4 AU once every 3 years and 2 months (1,161 days). Its orbit has an eccentricity of 0.09 and an inclination of 2° with respect to the ecliptic.

== Physical characteristics ==
=== Lightcurves ===
In January 2014, two rotational lightcurves of Rozhen were obtained from photometric observations at the Palomar Transient Factory in California, United States. They gave a rotation period of 3.9847 and 3.980 hours with a brightness variation of 0.14 and 0.12 magnitude, respectively (U=2/2).

=== Diameter and albedo ===
The Collaborative Asteroid Lightcurve Link assumes an albedo of 0.24, derived from 8 Flora, the asteroid family's largest member and namesake, and calculates a diameter of 3.0 kilometers with an absolute magnitude of 14.77.

== Naming ==
This minor planet was named for the discovering Rozhen Observatory, also known as the "Bulgarian National Astronomical Observatory", that has been established at Rozhen in 1981.

Rozhen is located near the city of Smoljan and in proximity to the border with Greece. At 1700 meters above sea leavel, the observatory benefits from favorable instrumental and observational conditions. An exhaustive survey for the discovery of minor planets was launched at Rozhen in 1986. The approved naming citation was published by the Minor Planet Center on 20 November 2002 (M.P.C. 47163).
