= Rabisha =

Rabisha Рабиша
- Village
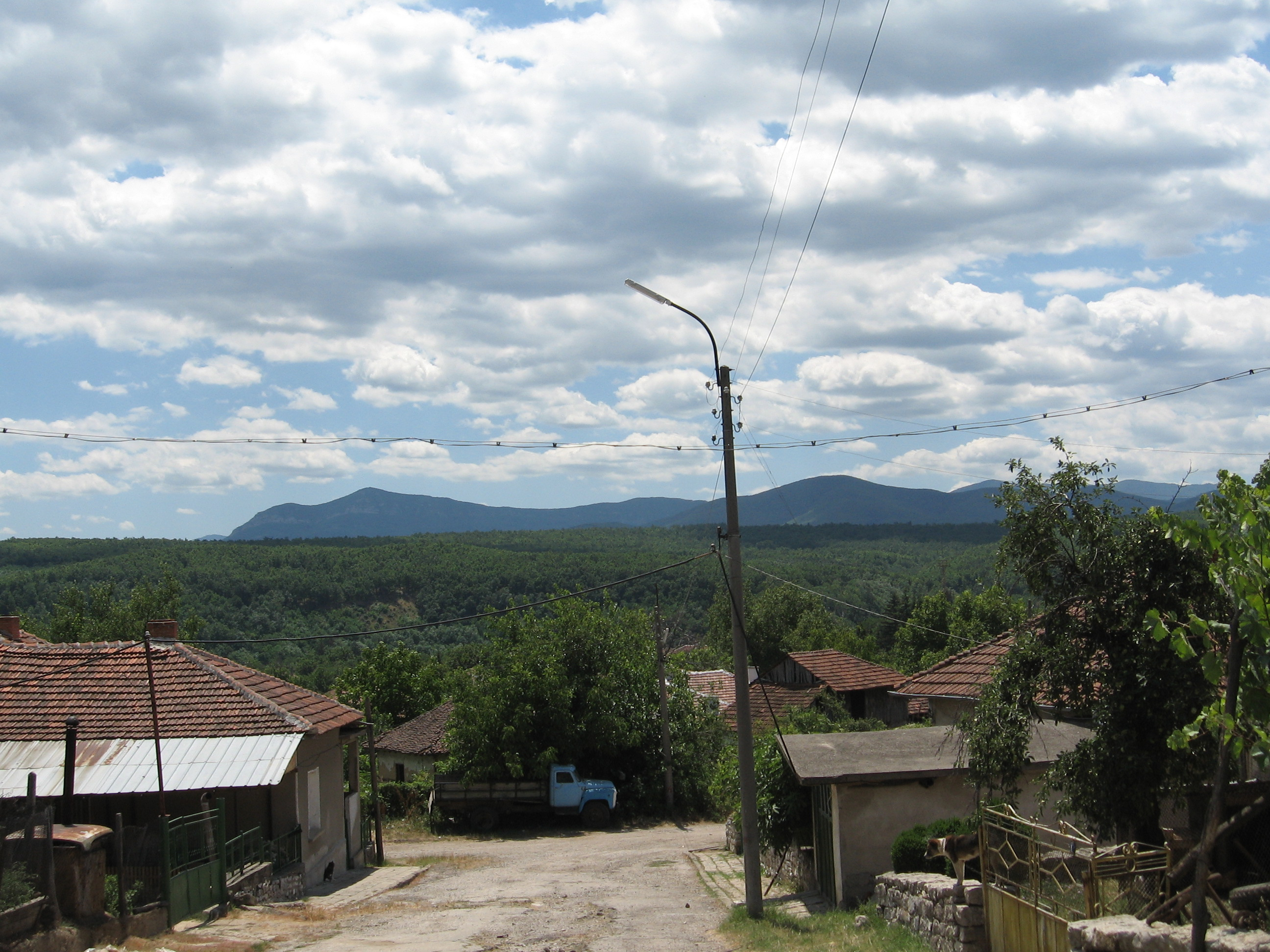

- Location within Bulgaria
- Coordinates: 43°43′0″N 22°36′0″E
- Country: Bulgaria
- Province: Vidin Province
- Municipality: Belogradchik

Government
  - Mayor: Boris Nikolov

Area
  - Total: 24.391 km^{2} (9.417 sq mi)
- Elevation: 224 m (735 ft)

Population (31-12-2013)
  - Total: 252
- Bulgaria Guide
- Time zone: UTC+2 (EET)
  - Summer (DST): UTC+3 (EEST)
- Postal Code: 3938

Rabisha (Bulgarian: Рабиша [rɐˈbiʃɐ]) is a village in north-western Bulgaria, in Vidin Province and Belogradchik municipality.

== Geography ==
Rabisha village is located 45 kilometers from Vidin and 20 km from Belogradchik. It is also located on Archar river. Its population is about 300 people. The nearest train station is in the town of Dimovo, 11.4 kilometers from Rabisha.

The village is near the Rabisha lake and the 15 million years old Magura cave, which is the largest cave in Bulgaria. There are unique drawings in the cave from primeval people. The drawings are about 5,000 years old. The Rabisha lake is the biggest Bulgarian non-salt lake. There are a lot of fish in it.

== Cultural and nature sights ==
- The Magura cave, located about 1.5 km north of the village.
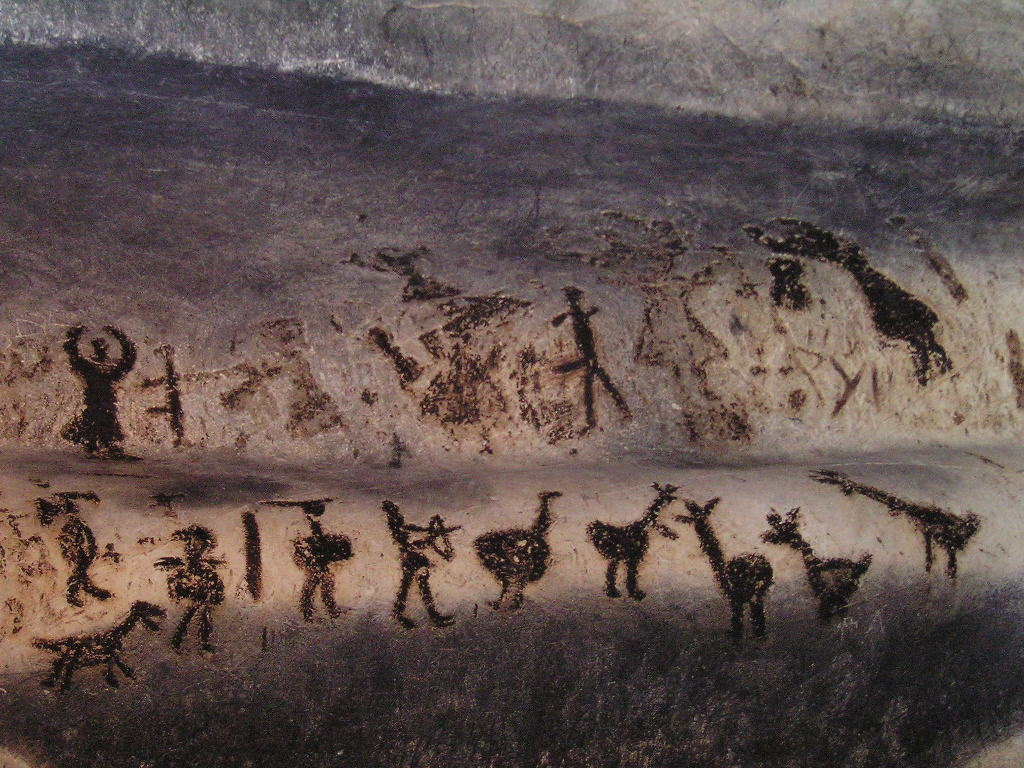
Some of the drawings in the Magura Cave

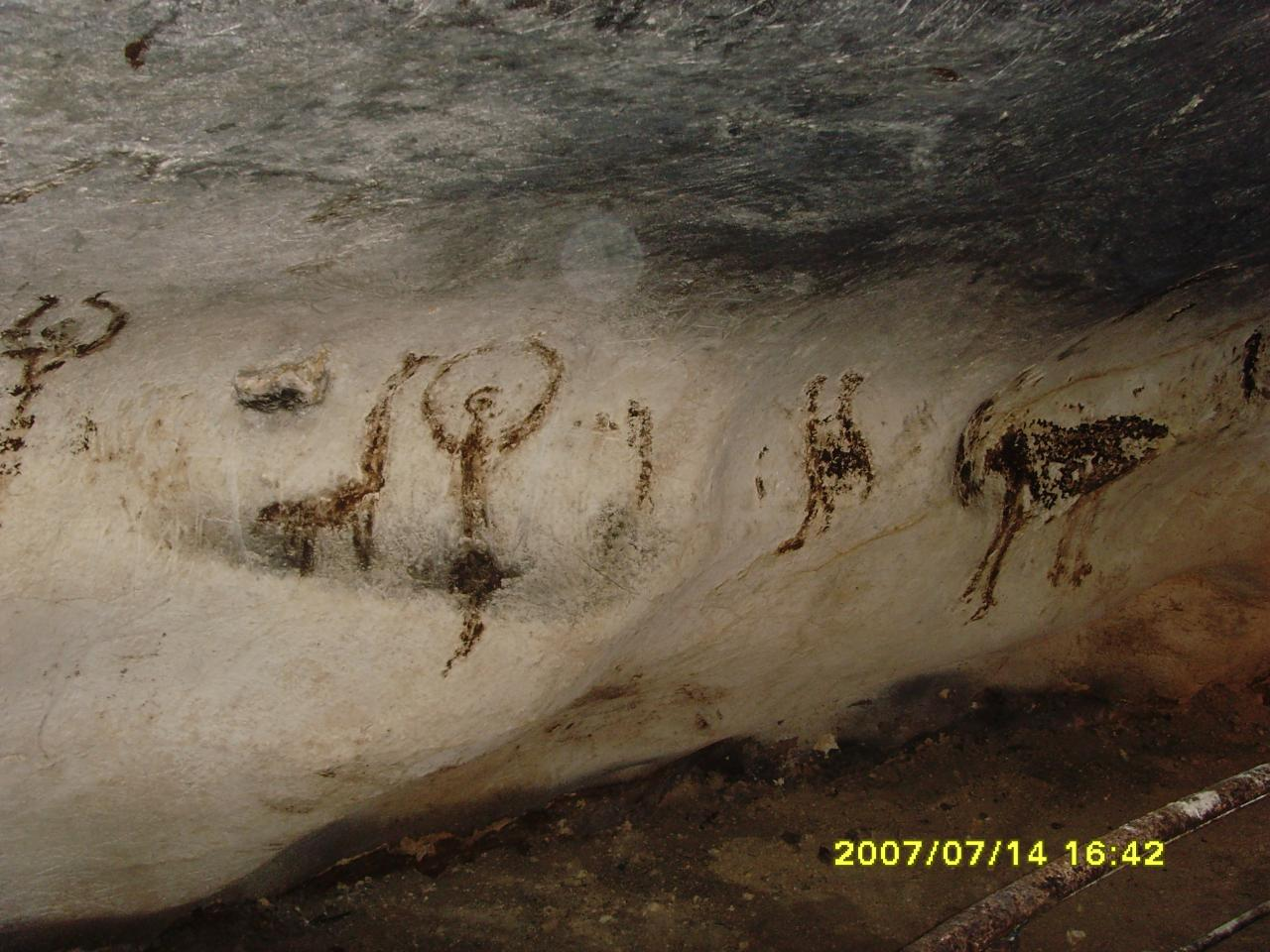
Another drawings

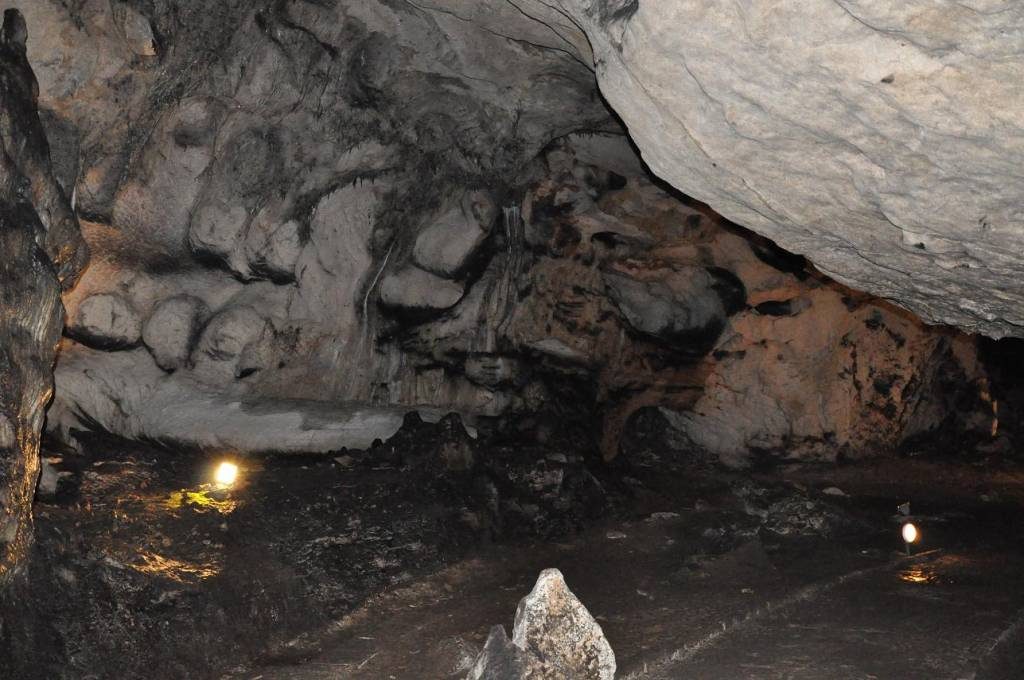
Inside the cave

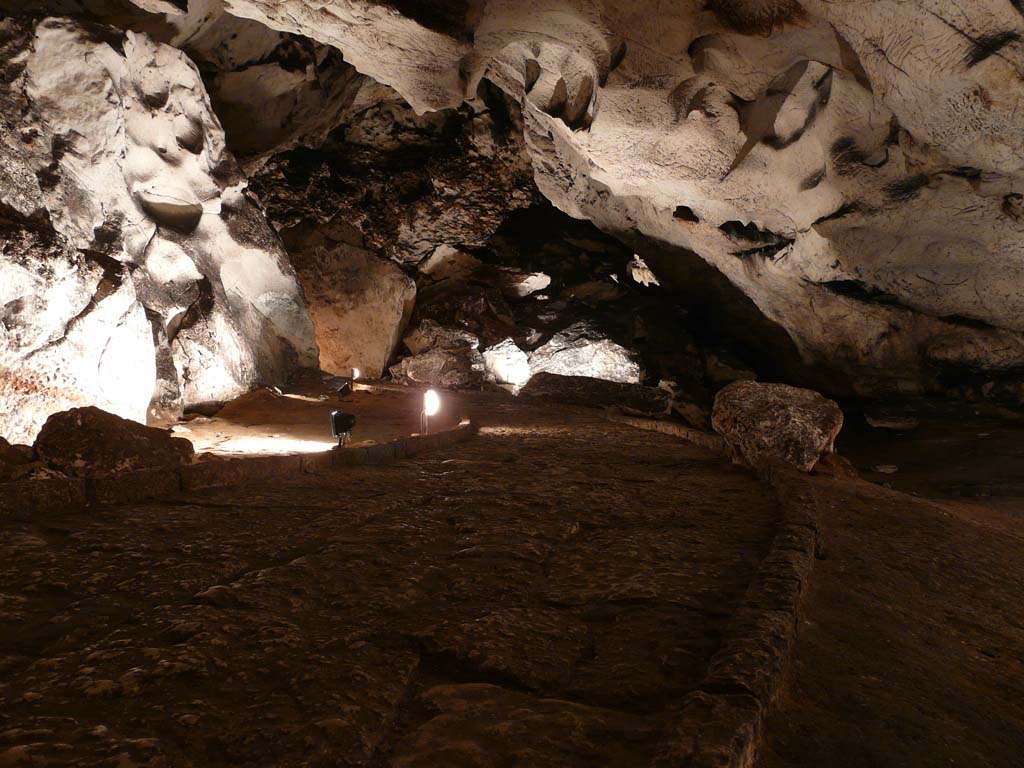
Inside the cave
- An old school, built in 1835.
- Rabisha lake - perfect place for fishing.
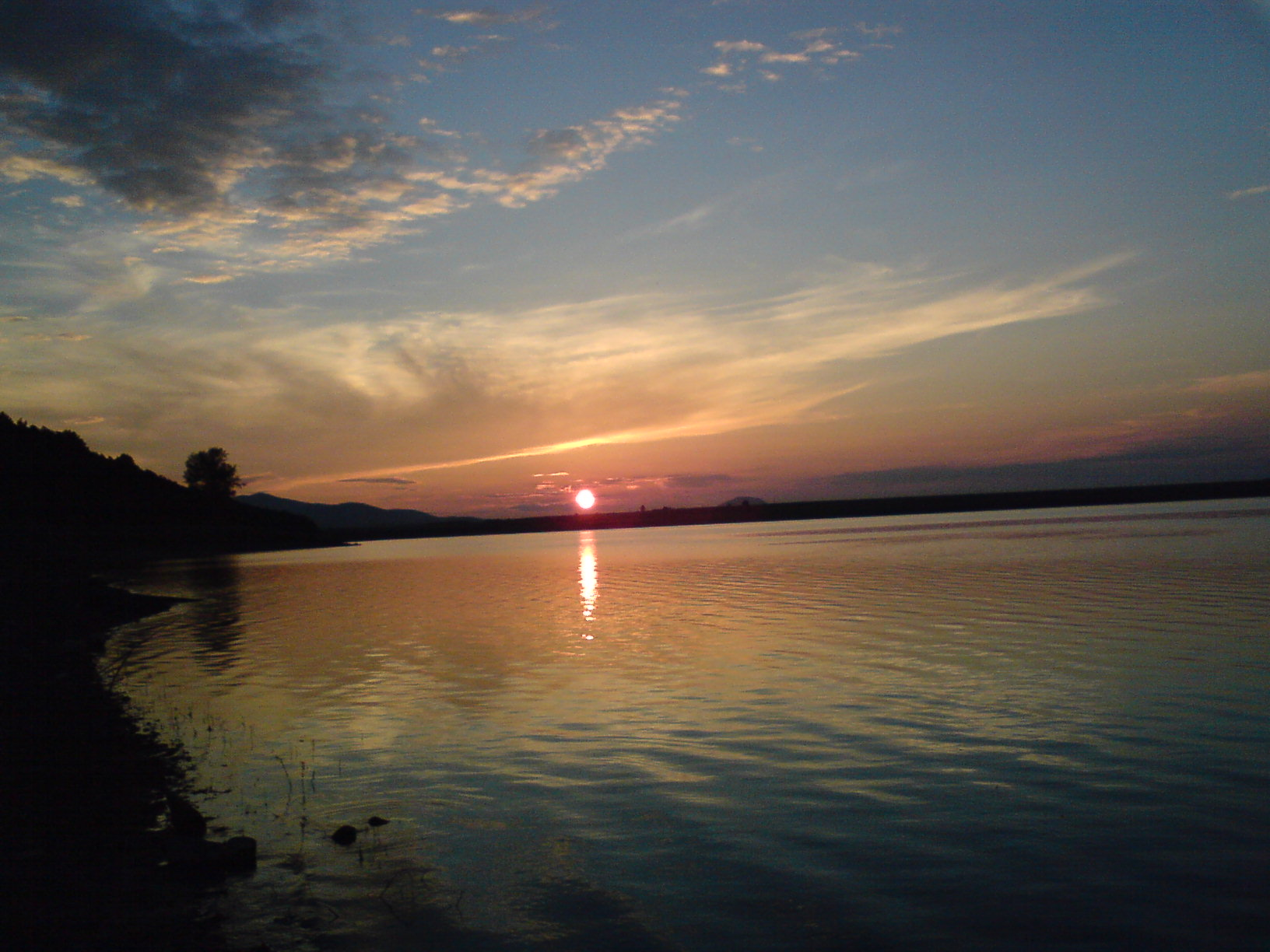
Sunset over the lake

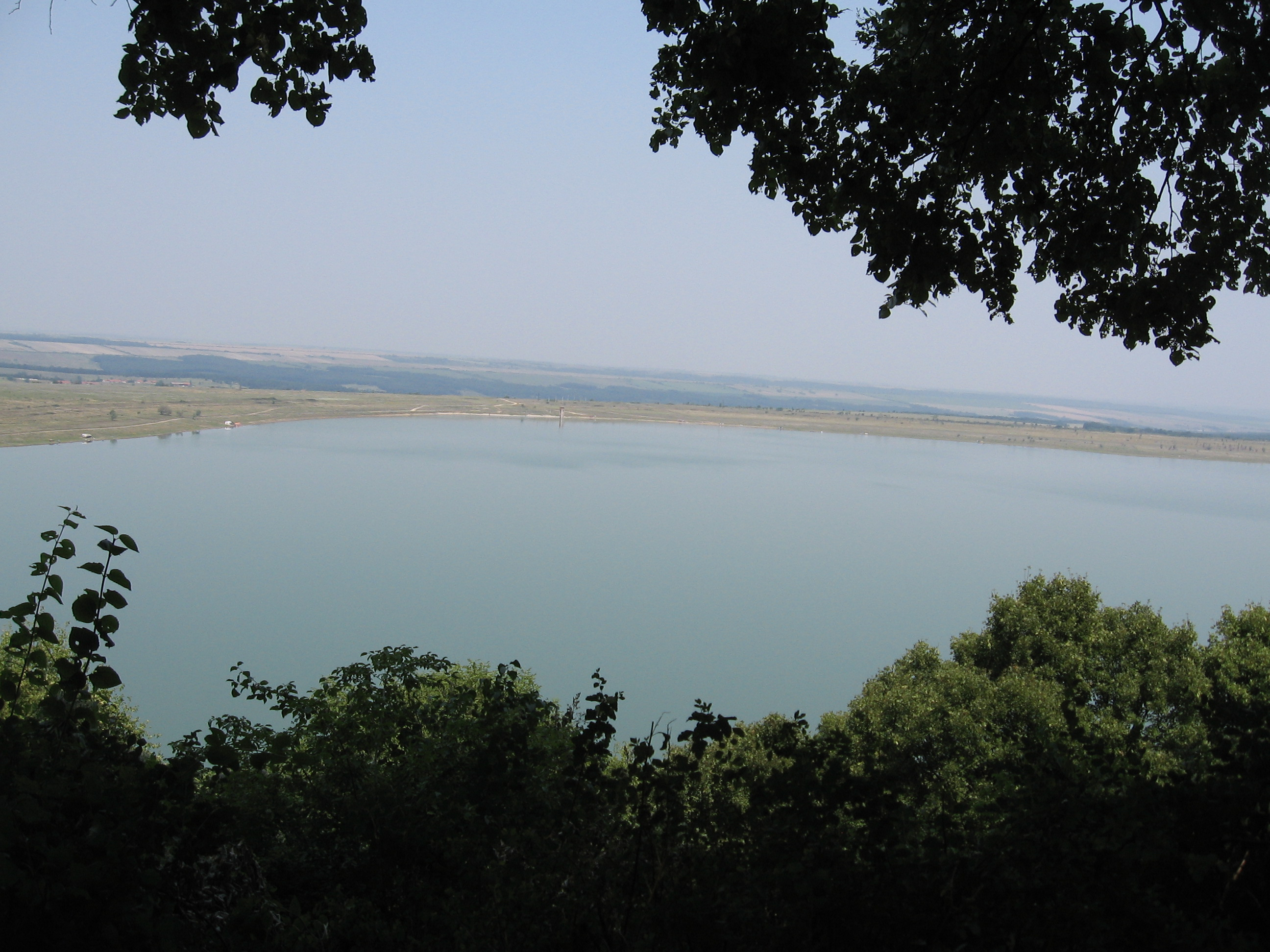
The Rabisha lake
- The Archar river that goes through the village flows into the Danube river.
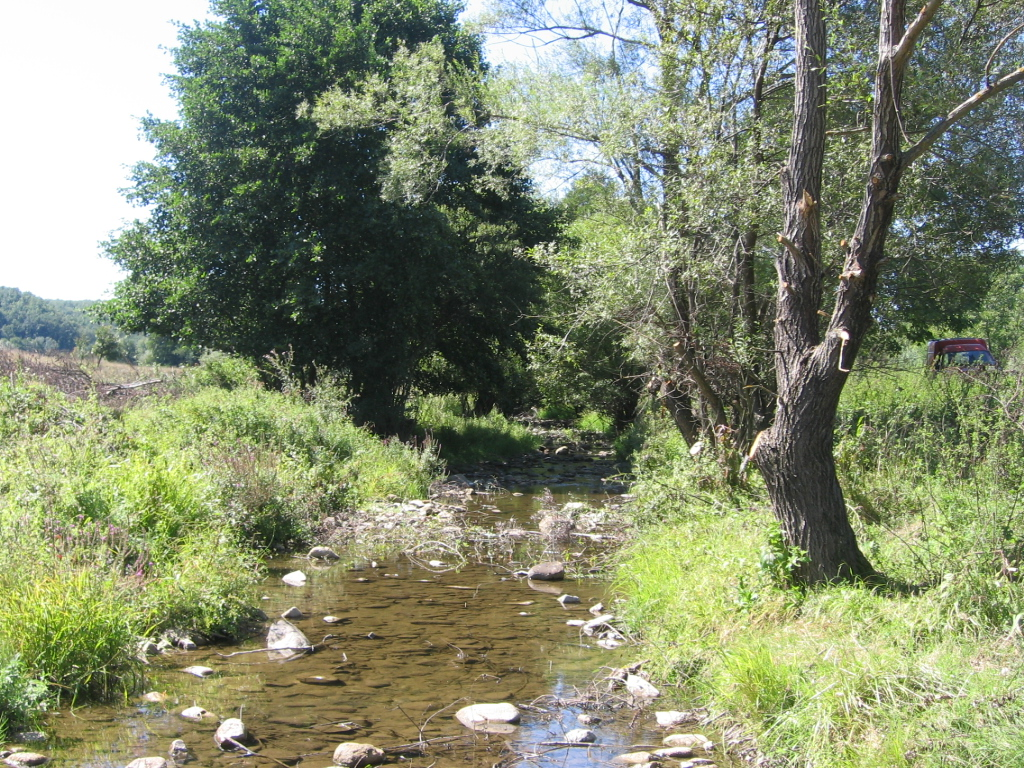
Archar river near Rabisha

== Others ==
There are two protected oak trees near Rabisha. They are over 300 years old, which makes them two of the oldest trees in Vidin region. The trees are tall, about 17 meters.

Near the Magura cave is located Magura Winery which produces high quality wine and champagne.
