= Makresh Municipality =

Makresh Municipality Община Макреш
- Municipality
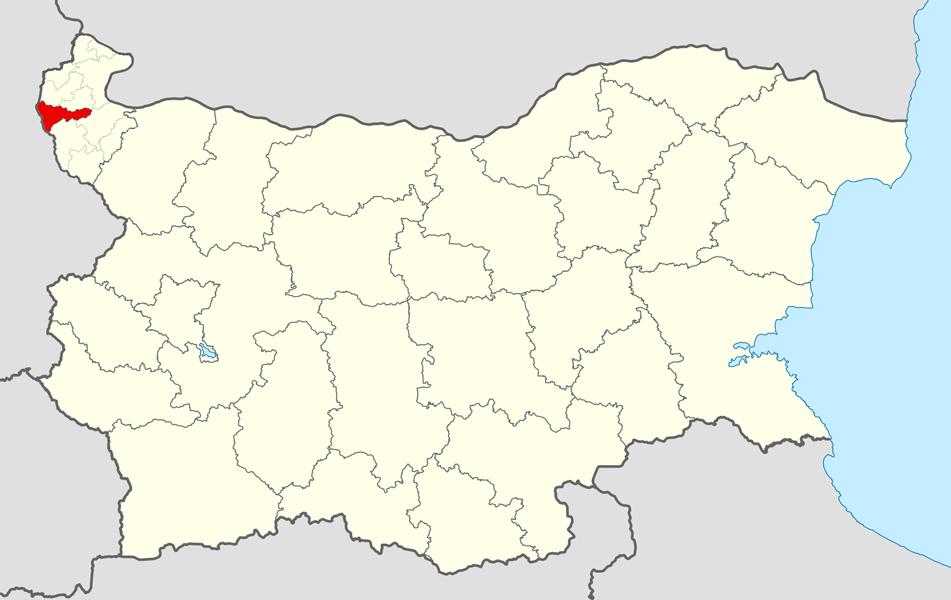
- Makresh Municipality within Bulgaria and Vidin Province.
- Coordinates: 43°45′N 22°29′E
- Country: Bulgaria
- Province (Oblast): Vidin
- Admin. centre (Obshtinski tsentar): Makresh

Area
  - Total: 229 km^{2} (88 sq mi)

Population (December 2023)
  - Total: 1,204
  - Density: 5.26/km^{2} (13.6/sq mi)
- Time zone: UTC+2 (EET)
  - Summer (DST): UTC+3 (EEST)

Makresh Municipality (Bulgarian: Община Макреш) is a municipality (obshtina) in Vidin Province, Northwestern Bulgaria, located in the Danubian Plain about 12 km southwest of Danube River. It is named after its administrative centre — the village of Makresh. The area borders on the Republic of Serbia to the west.

The municipality embraces a territory of 229 km^{2} (88 sq mi) with a population of 1,938 inhabitants, as of December 2009.

The easternmost border of the area is linked by the main road E79 which connects the province centre of Vidin with the city of Montana and respectively with the western operating part of Hemus motorway.

== Settlements ==
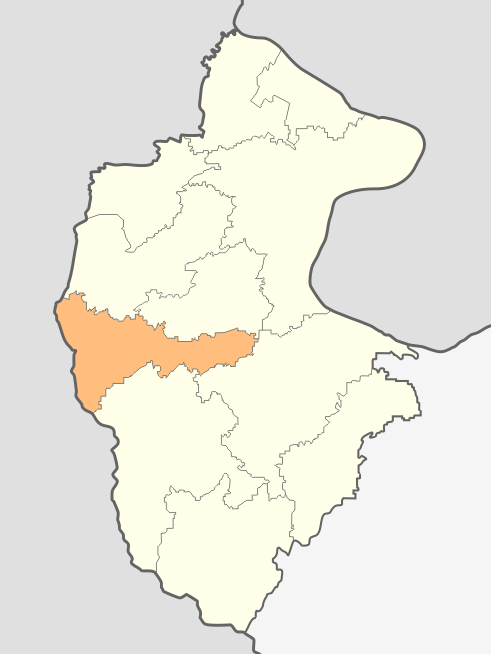
Makresh Municipality within Vidin Province

Makresh Municipality includes the following 7 places all of them villages:

Town/Village	Cyrillic	Population (December 2009)
Makresh	Макреш	473
Kireevo	Киреево	268
Podgore	Подгоре	278
Rakovitsa	Раковица	611
Tolovitsa	Толовица	70
Tsar Shishmanovo	Цар Шишманово	157
Valchek	Вълчек	81
Total		1,938

== Demography ==
The following table shows the change of the population during the last four decades.

Makresh Municipality
Year	1975	1985	1992	2001	2005	2007	2009	2011
Population	5,876	4,333	3,623	2,550	2,270	2,129	1,938	1,630
Sources: Census 2001, Census 2011, „pop-stat.mashke.org“,

=== Religion ===
According to the latest Bulgarian census of 2011, the religious composition, among those who answered the optional question on religious identification, was the following:

Religious composition of Makresh Municipality
Orthodox Christianity	75.9%
Catholicism	0.6%
Protestantism	0.5%
Islam	0.0%
No religion	14.8%
Prefer not to answer, others and indefinable	8.2%

An overwhelming majority of the population of Makresh Municipality identify themselves as Christians. At the 2011 census, 75.9% of respondents identified as Orthodox Christians belonging to the Bulgarian Orthodox Church.

== See also ==
- Provinces of Bulgaria
- Municipalities of Bulgaria
- List of cities and towns in Bulgaria
