= Rozhen Observatory =

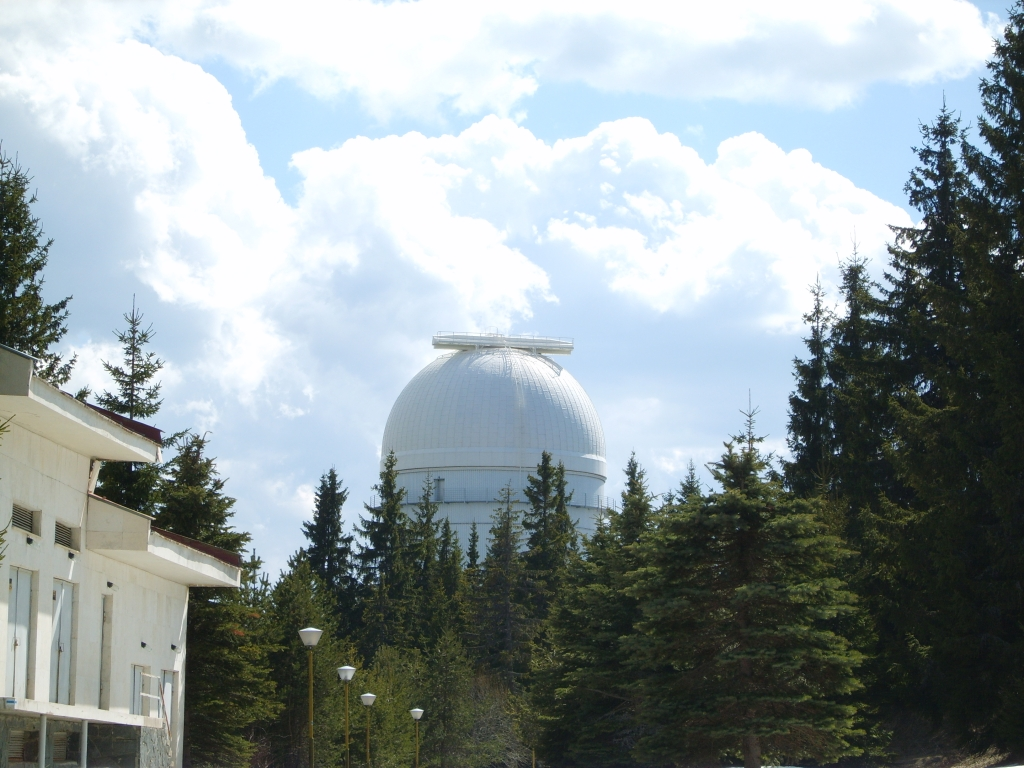
- Large Telescope Dome of the Rozhen Observatory
- Alternative names: Bulgarian National Rozhen Observatory
- Organization: Bulgarian Academy of Sciences
- Observatory code: 071
- Location: Near Chepelare, Bulgaria
- Coordinates: 41°41′36″N 24°44′20″E
- Altitude: 1,759 m (5,771 ft)
- Website: NAO-Rozhen

Telescopes
- Ritchey-Chretien-Coude telescope: 200 cm
- Cassegrain telescope: 60 cm Cassegrain reflector
- Schmidt telescope: 50/70 cm
- Solar Coronagraph telescope: 15 cm
- Related media on Commons

Rozhen Observatory (Bulgarian: Национална астрономическа обсерватория - Рожен, НАО-Рожен; English: National Astronomical Observatory - Rozhen, NAO-Rozhen), also known as the Bulgarian National Astronomical Observatory, is an astronomical observatory, located in the Smolyan Province, 90 kilometers south of the city of Plovdiv, Bulgaria. The nearest town, Chepelare, is 15 kilometers away. The observatory is owned and operated by the Institute of Astronomy of the Bulgarian Academy of Sciences (BAS). It was officially opened on 13 March 1981, almost 20 years after Bogomil Kovachev – a professor of astronomy at BAS, known as its founder – had started working towards that goal. The Observatory is one of the largest in Southeastern Europe and has an active team of about 50 astronomers. It is the principal center for astronomical research in Bulgaria. The minor planet 6267 Rozhen, was discovered at, and named after the observatory.

With its total cost of over $10 million at the time, it still remains to day the largest one-time investment in scientific infrastructure that Bulgaria ever made.

Telescopes

- 200 cm Ritchey-Chretien telescope (supplied with Coude focus)
- 150 cm Ritchey-Chrétien-Nasmyth telescope
- 60 cm Cassegrain telescope
- 50/70 cm Schmidt camera
- 30 cm MEADE
- 15 cm Solar telescope

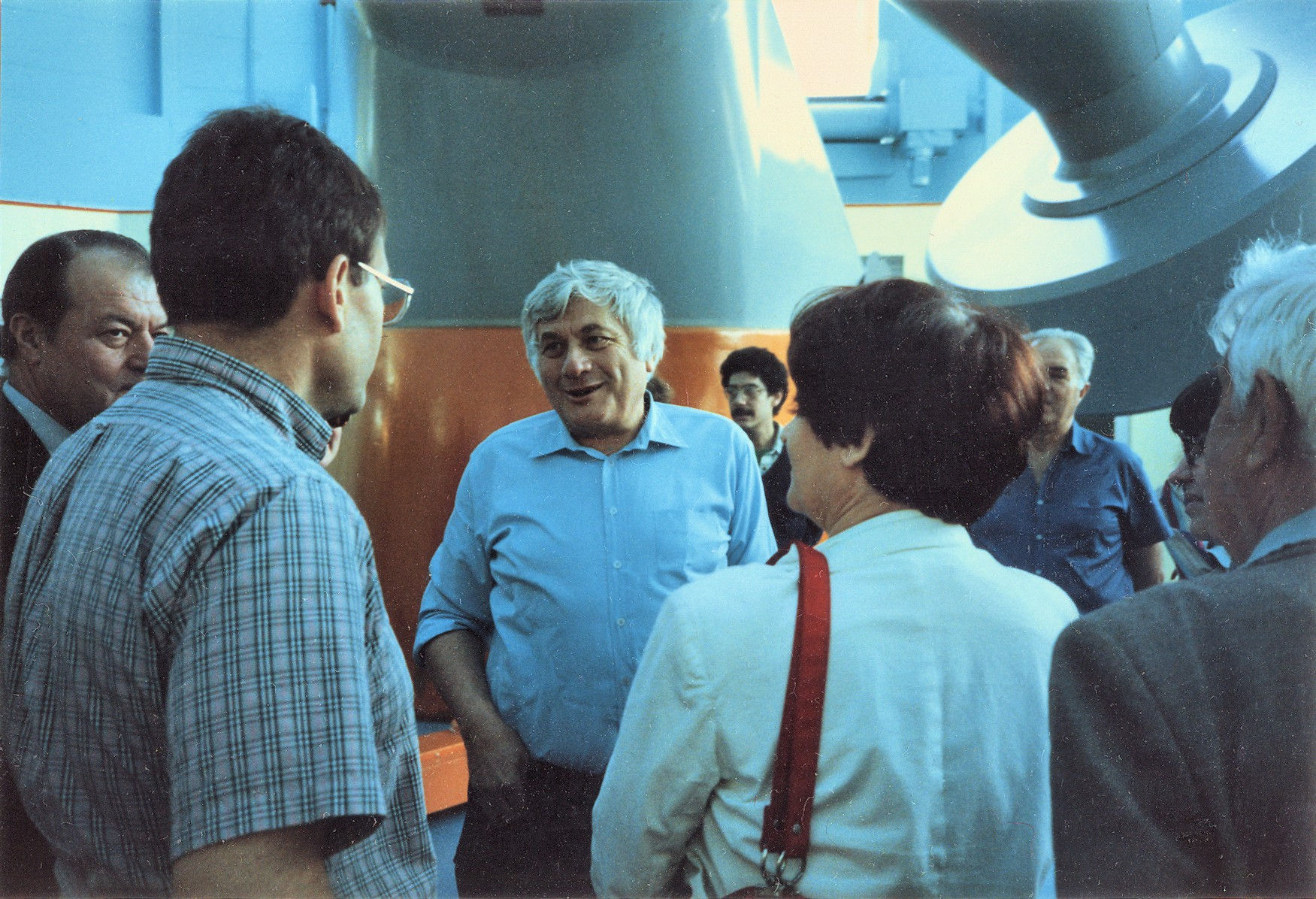
Bogomil Kovachev, founder of the Rozhen Observatory, with a group of visiting Bulgarian scholars in the summer of 1987

== WASP-3c & TTV ==
Transit Timing Variation (TTV), a variation on the transit method, was used to discover an exoplanet WASP-3c by Rozhen Observatory, Jena Observatory, and Toruń Centre for Astronomy.

== See also ==
- List of astronomical observatories
