= Institute of Astronomy of the Bulgarian Academy of Sciences =

Astronomy institute in Sofia, Bulgaria

Coordinates: 42°39′11″N 23°23′10″E

The Institute of Astronomy of the Bulgarian Academy of Sciences is a leading Bulgarian research facility in the field of astronomy and astrophysics, located in Sofia, Bulgaria.

The institute co-operates closely with the other two institutions involved in the same field of research in the country - the Department of Astronomy at the Faculty of Physics of Sofia University and the Astronomical centre at the Faculty of Natural Sciences of Shumen University.

It owns and operates the Bulgarian National Rozhen Observatory located at an altitude of 1750 m in the Rhodopi mountains in south Bulgaria, as well as the Belogradchik Observatory situated at 650 m at the foot of the Western Balkan Mountains in north-west Bulgaria.

The institute was inaugurated in 1958 as an independent section of the larger Institute of Physics of the Bulgarian Academy of Sciences by the academician Nikola Bonev. In 1995, it became a separate institute. The current director of the institute is Professor Dr. Evgeni Semkov. The deputy-director is Associate Professor Dr. Boyko Mihov.

Following a reorganisation in the structure of its departments in 2010, researchers at the institute were divided into three departments: "Sun and Solar System" (head: Dr. K. Kozarev), "Stars and stellar systems" (head: Dr. I. Stateva), "Galaxies" (head: Dr. B. Mihov). They replaced the previous division into seven sectors: "Sun", "Solar system", "Non-stationary stars", "Stellar atmospheres and envelopes", "Chemically peculiar stars", "Stellar clusters" and "Galaxies".
