= Magura Cave =

Cave and archaeological site in Bulgaria

Magura
- Пещера Магурата (Bulgarian)
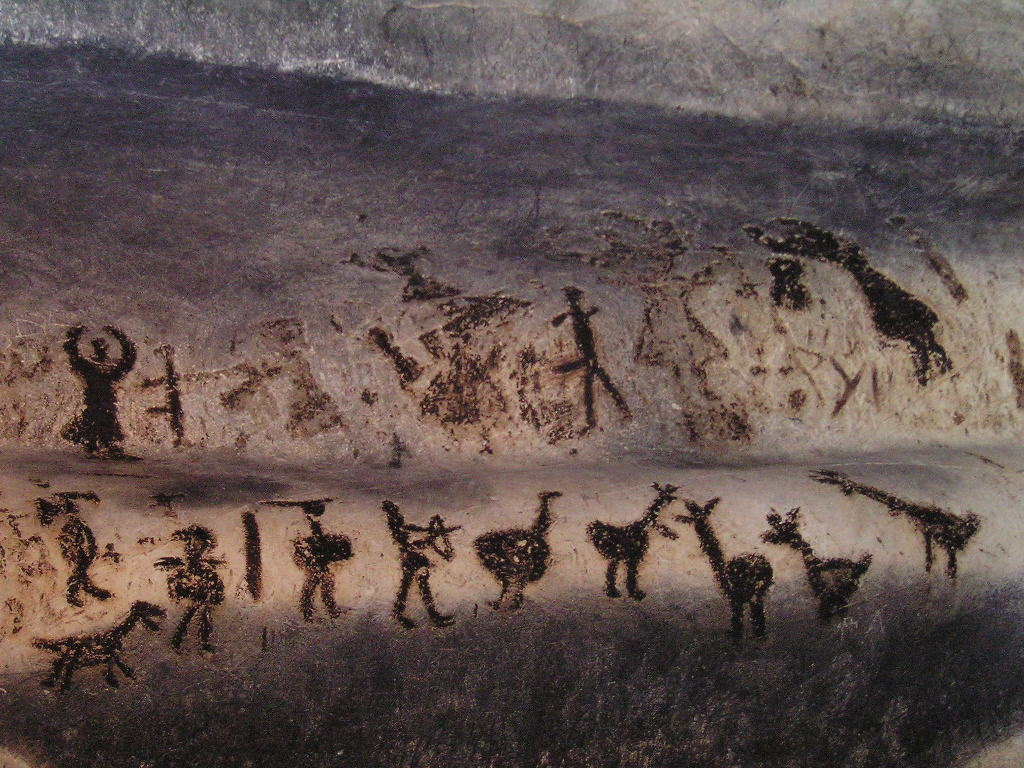
- Cave drawings in the Magura Cave

- Location in Bulgaria
- 43°43′40″N 22°34′58″E
- Location: Near Rabisha village, Belogradchik town, Belogradchik municipality
- Region: Vidin Province, Bulgaria

The Magura Cave (Bulgarian: пещера Магура) is located in north-western Bulgaria close to the village of Rabisha, 25 km (16 mi) from the town of Belogradchik in Vidin Province.

The prehistoric wall paintings of Magura have great resemblance with those of the Grotta dei Cervi in Italy, which are of exceptional expression and artistic depth and are considered the most significant works of art of the European Post-Paleolithic era.

Guided visits are conducted by the staff of Belogradchik municipality, to which the management of the cave was transferred in 2012 by the Bulgarian Council of Ministers.

In 1984, the site was inducted into UNESCO's tentative list of World Heritage.

== Description ==
The total length of the 15 million year old cave is 2.5 km (1.6 mi). The average annual temperature of the cave is 12 °C (285 K; 54 °F), except for one room where the temperature is always 15 °C (288 K; 59 °F). The air humidity reaches 80% and the displacement - 56 m (184 ft). The Magura cave was formed in the limestone Rabisha Hill (461 m (1,512 ft) above sea level). The morphology of the cave consists of one main gallery with six various-sized halls and three lateral galleries around it. The main gallery is composed of six chambers, variously sized; the largest one, the so-called Arc Hall, is 128 m (420 ft) long, 58 m (190 ft) wide and 21 m (69 ft) high, including impressive natural vaults, speleothems, spectacular stalactites and stalagmites, named The Poplar, The Pipe Organ, The Oriental City and The Cactus. The very spacious site also allows for music concerts to be held during Christmas and Easter.

== Fauna ==
Bones from prehistoric species like cave bear, cave hyena, fox, wolf, wild cat and otter have been discovered in the Magura Cave. Today, the constant inhabitants of the cave include the collembola, as well as four types of bats (greater and lesser horseshoe bat, greater mouse-eared bat and Schreibers's bat or also called common bent-wing bat).

== Paintings ==
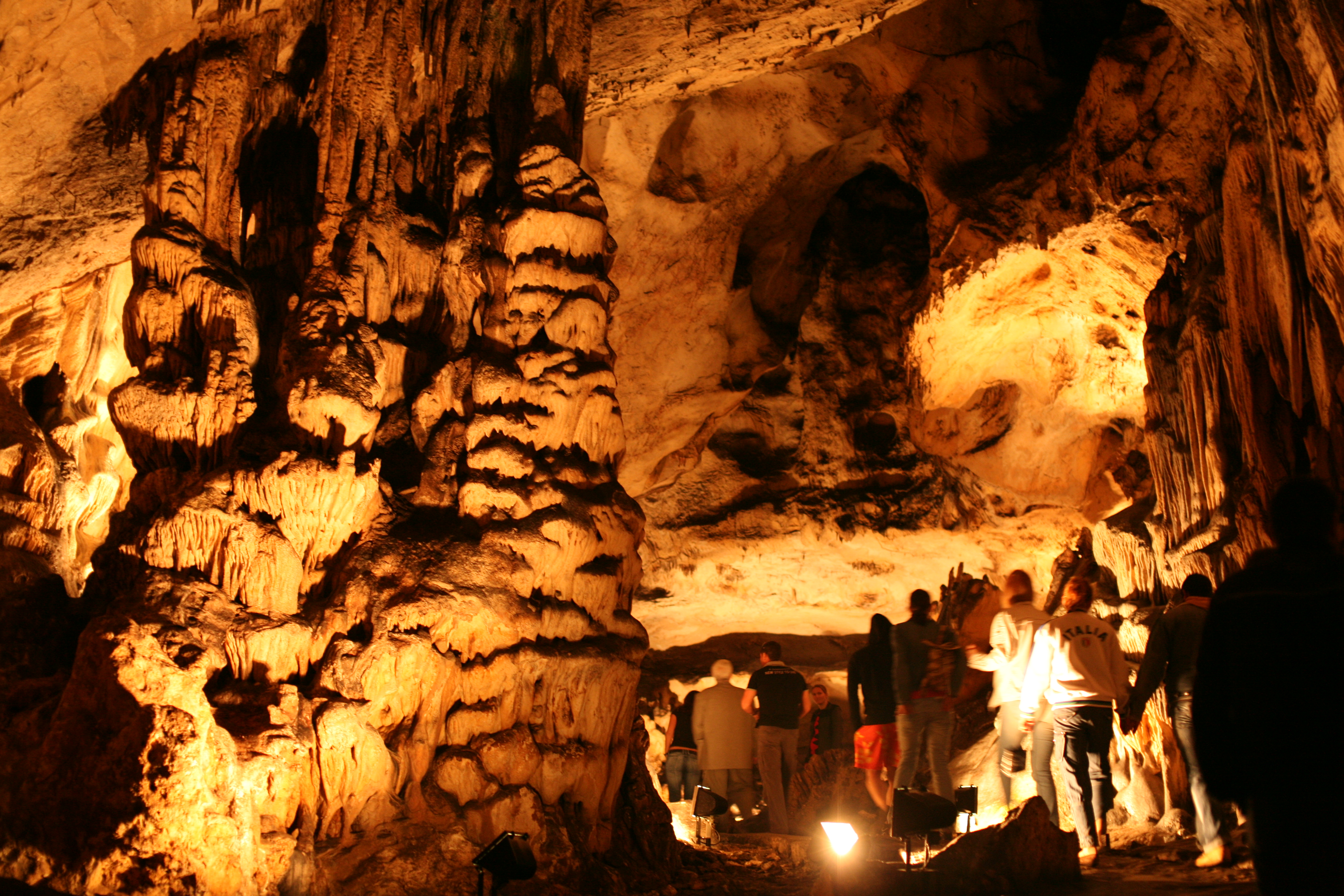
View from the cave

Cave paintings dating from the Epipaleolithic, late Neolithic, Eneolithic and early Bronze Age decorate some of the cave's walls. The paintings have been estimated to be made between 10.000 and 8.000 years ago. The drawings represent important events of the society that had occupied the Magura Cave: religious ceremonies, hunting scenes and depictions of deities which are unique on the Balkan Peninsula. The Fertility Dance and the Hunting Ceremony rank among the most noteworthy paintings.

One grouping from the Bronze Age has been interpreted as a solar calendar. According to Alexey Stoev and Penka Vlaykova Stoeva Bronze Age "paintings of staggered black and white squares used to count the days in the calendar month permit to describe fairly accurately the number of days in the solar tropical year (Stoev and Muglova 1999). The cave paintings allowed storing information about regional solar calendar, customs, religious festivals, and rituals of the society the earliest such representation yet discovered in Europe."

Contemporary imitations of possible fertility rites are reported — inscriptions in Latin and paintings made by treasure-hunters. The medium used to create the art was bat guano. More than 750 images have been identified.

Painted signs can be organised into four thematic groups: anthropomorphic, zoomorphic, geometric, and symbolic (astronomic?) figures. For the first group, there are bitriangular silhouettes with raised rounded arms (females with a sort of a waist bow, males with legs and sex like a trident, sometimes stylised like a "bottle opener"), archers, ithyphallic figures, copula, linear schematic anthropomorphic figures with raised arms (sometimes like dancing) and "fungiforms". Regarding zoomorphic items, there are caprids, bovids, dogs, "ostrich-like" animals (big birds) and schematic linear quadrupeds. Geometric signs show T-shaped figures, vertical parallel lines, horizontal zigzags, vertical parallel zigzags, branch-like or tree-like figures, chessboard patterns, rhombi, horizontal stair-like patterns, crossed networks, honeycomb networks and crossed circles. Few rayed circle figures, mainly the two unica of the so-called calendar scene, likely represent a sun depiction.

Taking count of some associated figures, it is possible to recognize dancing, hunting, and mating scenes. In the so-called Cult Hall a large horizontal dance and hunting scene is depicted, arranged in two main rows: these are the best known and most reproduced Magura Cave images.

Access to the area of the paintings is restricted in an effort to preserve them. Before 1993, the cave wasn't protected and there was free access to all. For this reason, some of the drawings have been vandalised and there are scratches on the walls. The cave is now open to the public all year round although the drawings can be seen only with the presence of a tour guide and the payment of a fee.

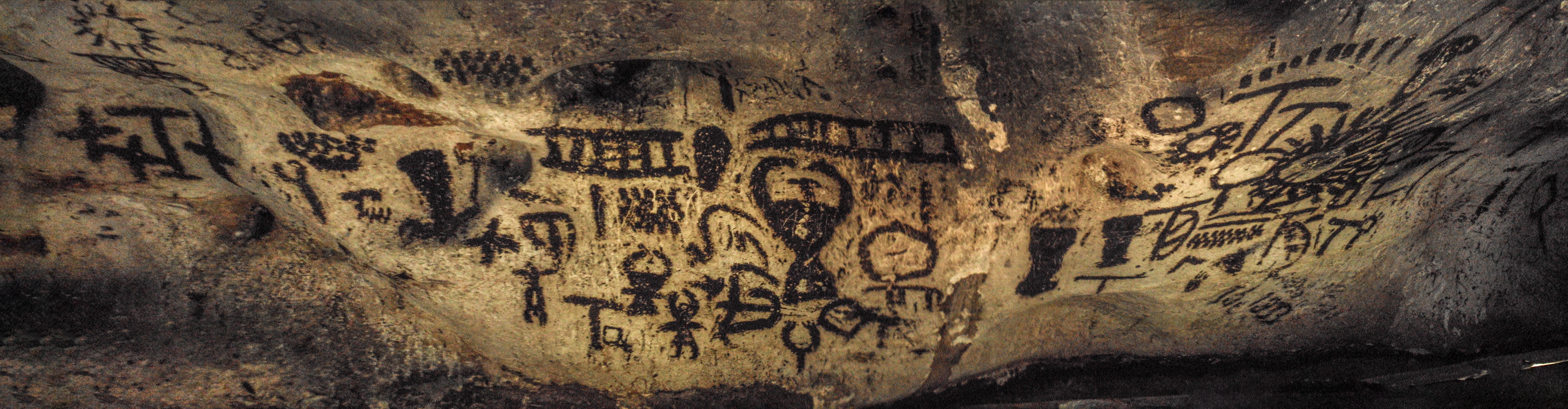
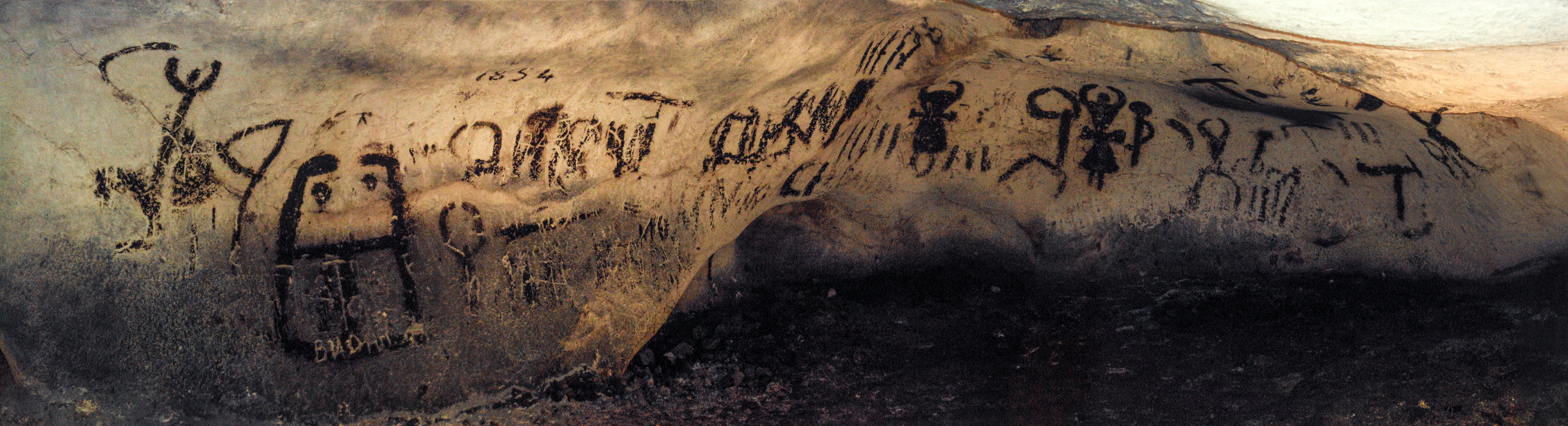
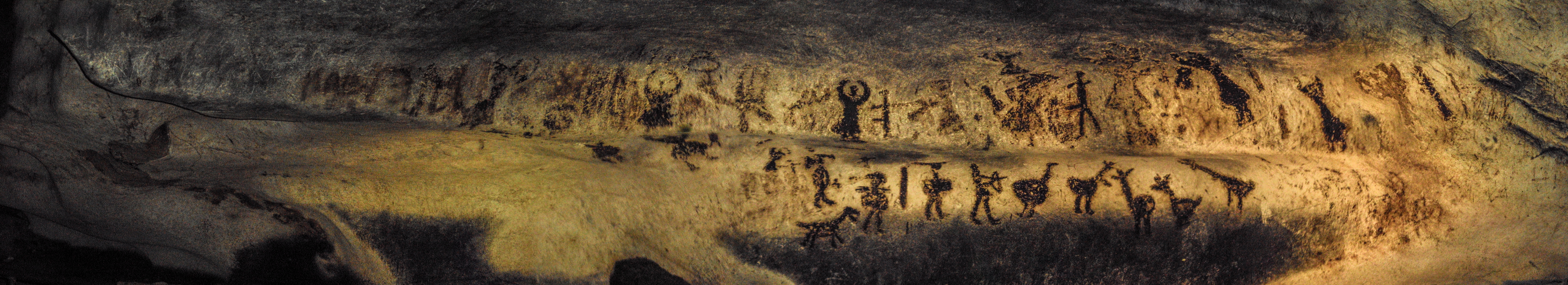
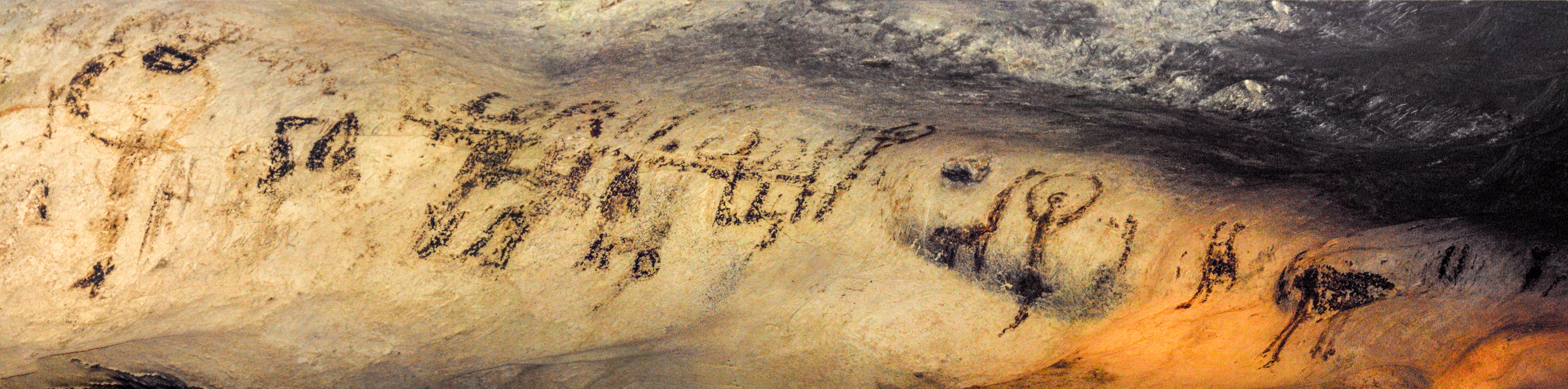

== See also ==
- Old Europe (archaeology)
- Vinča culture
- History of Bulgaria
