= Pisanitsa Island =

Island in the South Shetland Islands, Antarctica

- Location of Greenwich Island in the South Shetland Islands

- Location within Antarctica Location within Antarctic Peninsula

Geography
- Location: Antarctica
- Coordinates: 62°26′48″S 60°03′14.5″W
- Archipelago: South Shetland Islands

Administration
- Antarctica
- Administered under the Antarctic Treaty System

Demographics
- Population: Uninhabited

Pisanitsa Island (Bulgarian: остров Писаница, romanized: ostrov Pisanitsa, IPA: [ˈɔstrof ˈpisɐnit͡sɐ]) is the rocky island in the Meade group off Archar Peninsula, the northwest extremity of Greenwich Island in the South Shetland Islands extending 270 m in southwest-northeast direction and 60 m wide. The area was visited by early 19th century sealers.

The island is named after the settlement of Pisanitsa in Southern Bulgaria.

== Location ==
Pisanitsa Island is located 1.26 km west by north of Duff Point, 120 m northeast of Cave Island and 3.6 km southeast of Pyramid Island. British mapping in 1968 and Bulgarian mapping in 2009.

== Maps ==
- Livingston Island to King George Island. Scale 1:200000. Admiralty Nautical Chart 1776. Taunton: UK Hydrographic Office, 1968.
- L.L. Ivanov. Antarctica: Livingston Island and Greenwich, Robert, Snow and Smith Islands. Scale 1:120000 topographic map. Troyan: Manfred Wörner Foundation, 2009. ISBN 978-954-92032-6-4 (Second edition 2010, ISBN 978-954-92032-9-5)
- Antarctic Digital Database (ADD). Scale 1:250000 topographic map of Antarctica. Scientific Committee on Antarctic Research (SCAR). Since 1993, regularly upgraded and updated.
