= Dimovo =

Dimovo Димово
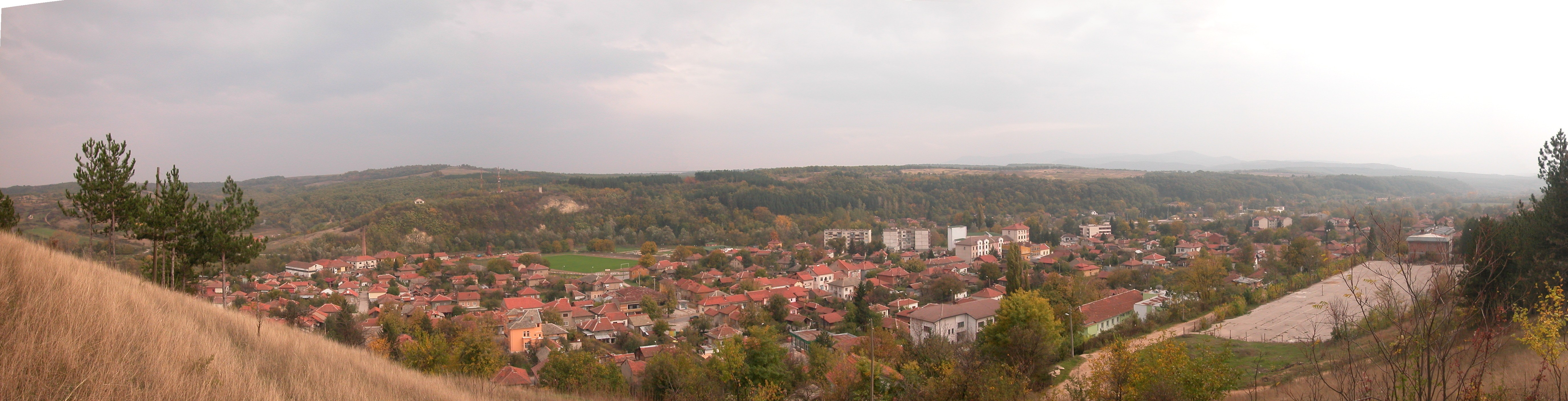
- Panoramic overview of Dimovo

- Location of Dimovo
- Coordinates: 43°45′N 22°44′E
- Country: Bulgaria
- Provinces (Oblast): Vidin

Government
  - Mayor: Lozan Lozanov
- Elevation: 75 m (246 ft)

Population (December 2009)
  - Total: 1,211
- Time zone: UTC+2 (EET)
  - Summer (DST): UTC+3 (EEST)
- Postal Code: 3750
- Area code: 09341

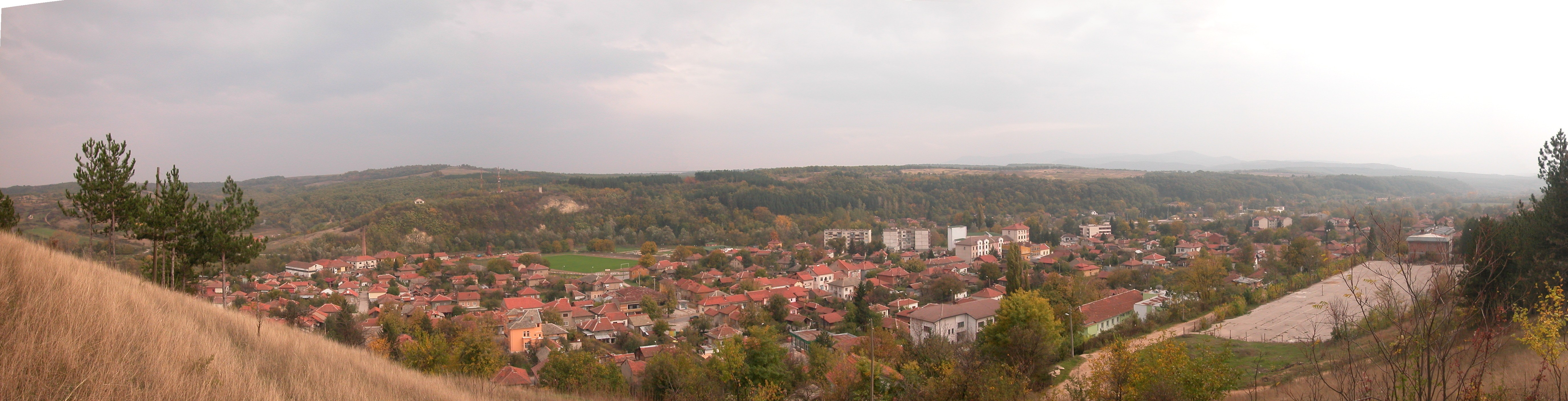

Dimovo (Bulgarian: Димово [ˈdimovo]) is a town in northwestern Bulgaria, part of Vidin Province. It is the administrative centre of the homonymous Dimovo Municipality, which lies in the eastern part of Vidin Province, 30 kilometres (19 mi) from Vidin at the Danube and 50 kilometres (31 mi) from Bregovo at the Timok River and the Serbian border. As of December 2009, Dimovo had a population of 1,211 inhabitants.

The town is located in the western Danubian Plain. Until the Liberation of Bulgaria in 1878, it was known as Barzitsa (Бързица) in Bulgarian, but it had the Ottoman name Osmaniye. In 1880, it was renamed to Aleksandrovo after the Bulgarian knyaz Alexander I of Battenberg. It was briefly named Vlaykovo in honour of Todor Vlaykov in 1936, but the name was changed back to honour Alexander as Knyaz Aleksandrovo in the same year. Finally, the modern name of Dimovo was established in 1951, after local partisan Zhivko Puev's nickname, Dimo.

== Municipality ==
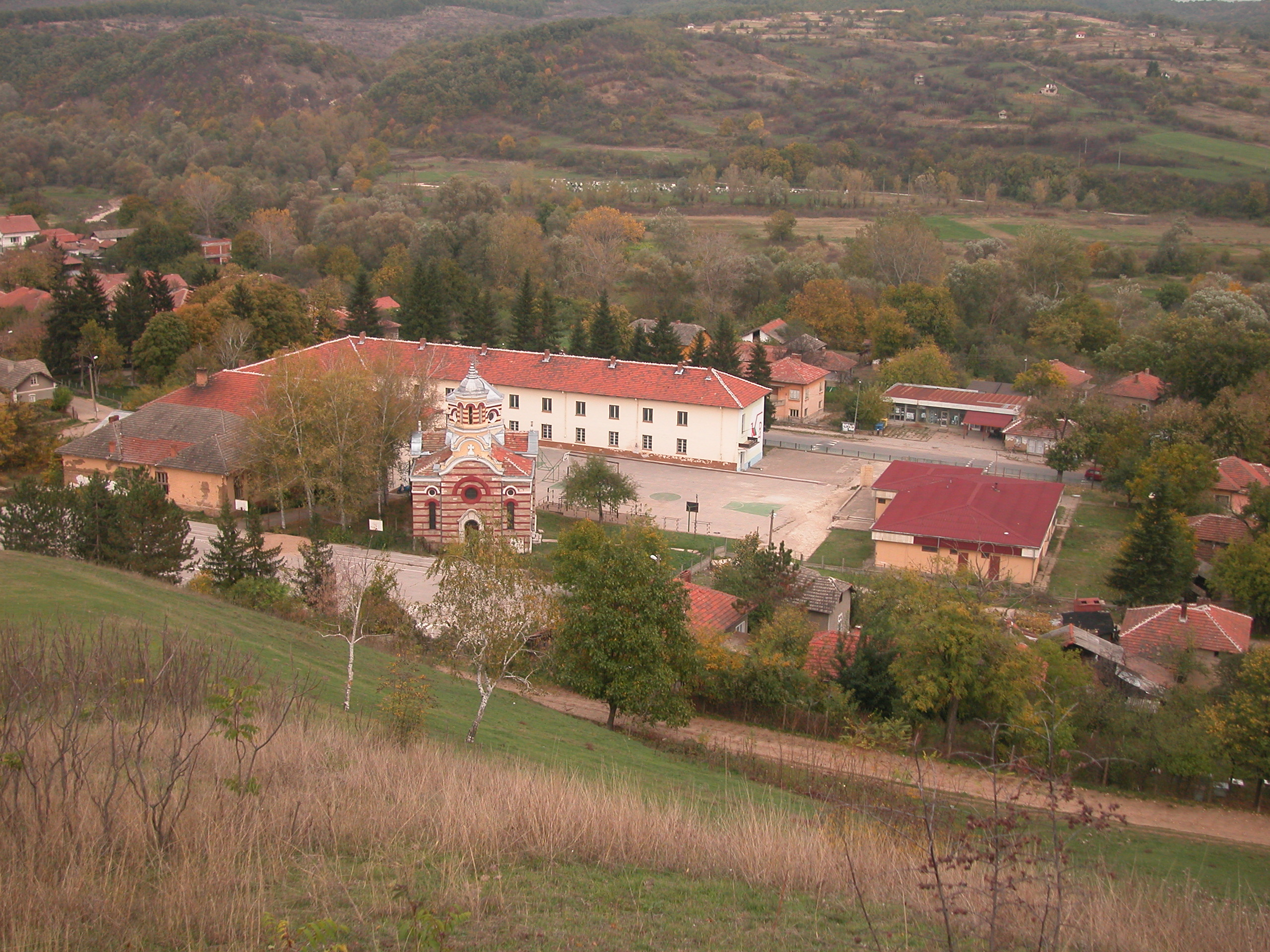
The primary school and the Eastern Orthodox church in Dimovo

Dimovo municipality has an area of 402 square kilometres (155 sq mi) and includes the following 23 places:

- Archar
- Bela
- Dalgo Pole
- Darzhanitsa
- Dimovo
- Gara Oreshets
- Izvor
- Karbintsi
- Kladorub
- Kostichovtsi
- Lagoshevtsi
- Mali Drenovets
- Medovnitsa
- Oreshets
- Ostrokaptsi
- Septemvriytsi
- Shipot
- Skomlya
- Varbovchets
- Vladichentsi
- Vodnyantsi
- Yanyovets
- Yarlovitsa
