= Salashka reka =

Location
- Country: Bulgaria

Physical characteristics
- Source
  - location: Balkan Mountains
  - coordinates: 43°35′26.16″N 22°29′26.88″E
  - elevation: 1,180 m (3,870 ft)
- Mouth
  - location: Danube
  - coordinates: 43°43′5.88″N 22°39′47.16″E
  - elevation: 168 m (551 ft)
- Length: 27 km (17 mi)
- Basin size: 124 km^{2} (48 sq mi)

Basin features
- Progression: Archar→ Danube

The Salashka reka (Bulgarian: Салашка река) is a river in northwestern Bulgaria, a right tributary of the Archar, itself a right tributary of the Danube. Its length is 27 km.

The river takes its source at an altitude of 1,180 m some 700 m northwest of the summit of Zhrebche (1,373 m) in the Sveti Nikola section of the northwestern part of the Balkan Mountains. It flows in general direction northeast throughout the whole course. The river forms a gorge between the villages of Salash and Granichak. Its valley then widens and the river flows into the Archar at an altitude of 161 m at the village of Kladorub.

Its drainage basin covers a territory of 124 km^{2}, or 34% of the Archar's total. The average annual discharge at the village of Veshtitsa is 0.7 m^{3}/s.

The Salashka reka flows entirely in Vidin Province. There are four villages along its course, Salash, Granichak and Veshtitsa in Belogradchik Municipality, and Kladorub in Dimovo Municipality. Its waters are utilized for irrigation.
