= Rusokastro Rock =

Rock in the South Shetland Islands, Antarctica

- Location of Greenwich Island in the South Shetland Islands

- Location on Antarctic Peninsula Location in Antarctica

Geography
- Location: Antarctica
- Coordinates: 62°24′17.6″S 60°05′10″W
- Archipelago: South Shetland Islands

Administration
- Antarctica
- Administered under the Antarctic Treaty System

Demographics
- Population: uninhabited

Rusokastro Rock (Bulgarian: скала Русокастро, ‘Skala Rusokastro’ ska-'la ru-so-'kas-tro) is a twin rock at the north entrance to McFarlane Strait in the South Shetland Islands, Antarctica extending 170 m (560 ft) in northwest–southeast direction and 70 m (230 ft) wide, with its two parts separated by a 30 m (98 ft) wide passage. It is situated 1.6 km (0.99 mi) northeast of Pyramid Island, 5.7 km (3.54 mi) northeast of Williams Point on Livingston Island, and 5.7 km (3.54 mi) northwest of Duff Point on Greenwich Island. The area was visited by early 19th century sealers.

The rock is named after the settlement and medieval fortress of Rusokastro in southeastern Bulgaria.

== Location ==
Rusokastro Rock is located at 62°24′18″S 60°05′07″W (Bulgarian mapping in 2009).

Topographic map of Livingston Island and Smith Island

== See also ==
- Composite Antarctic Gazetteer
- List of Antarctic islands south of 60° S
- SCAR
- Territorial claims in Antarctica

== Map ==
L.L. Ivanov. Antarctica: Livingston Island and Greenwich, Robert, Snow and Smith Islands. Scale 1:120000 topographic map. Troyan: Manfred Wörner Foundation, 2009. ISBN 978-954-92032-6-4
