= Glogovo Passage =

Sea passage in Antarctica

Location of Greenwich Island in the South Shetland Islands.

Topographic map of Livingston Island and Smith Islands.

Glogovo Passage (Bulgarian: проток Глогово, ‘Protok Glogovo’ \'pro-tok 'glo-go-vo\) is the 110 metre wide passage between Zverino Island on the west-southwest and Cave Island on the east-northeast in the Meade group off Archar Peninsula, the northwest extremity of Greenwich Island in the South Shetland Islands, Antarctica.

The passage is named after the settlement of Glogovo in Northern Bulgaria.

== Location ==
Glogovo Passage is located at 62°27′00″S 60°03′59″W. British mapping in 1968 and Bulgarian mapping in 2009.

== Maps ==
- Livingston Island to King George Island. Scale 1:200000. Admiralty Nautical Chart 1776. Taunton: UK Hydrographic Office, 1968.
- L.L. Ivanov. Antarctica: Livingston Island and Greenwich, Robert, Snow and Smith Islands. Scale 1:120000 topographic map. Troyan: Manfred Wörner Foundation, 2009. ISBN 978-954-92032-6-4 (Second edition 2010, ISBN 978-954-92032-9-5)
- Antarctic Digital Database (ADD). Scale 1:250000 topographic map of Antarctica. Scientific Committee on Antarctic Research (SCAR). Since 1993, regularly upgraded and updated.
