= Archar (river) =

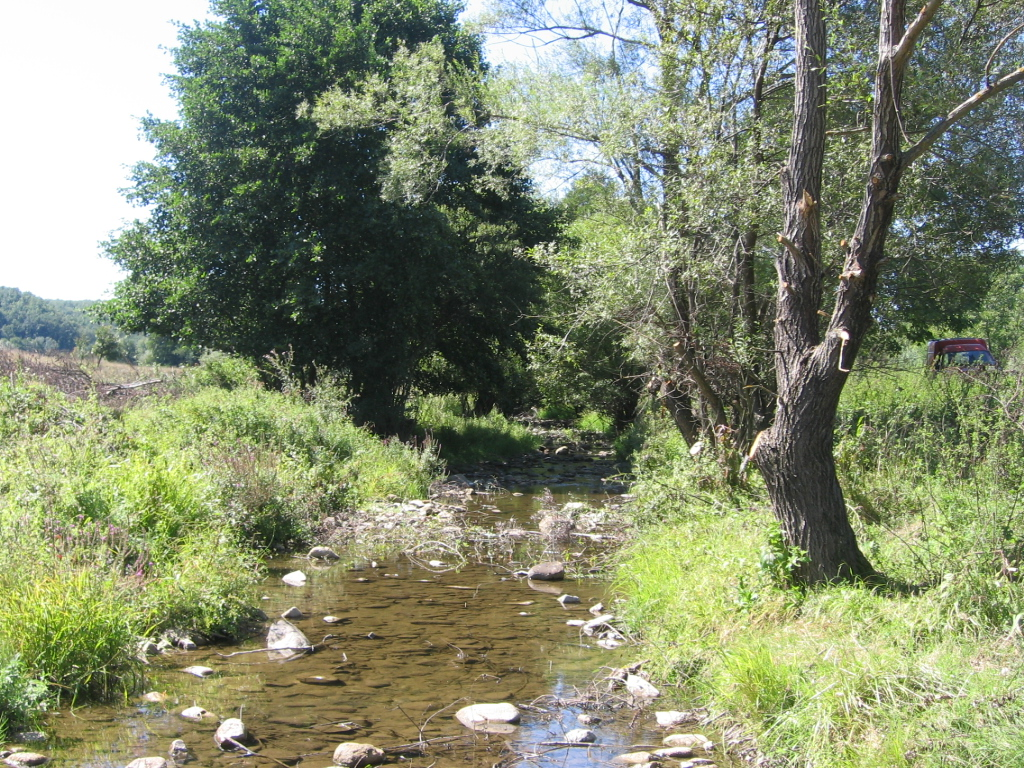

Location
- Country: Bulgaria

Physical characteristics
- Source
  - location: Babin Nos, Balkan Mountains
  - coordinates: 43°43′0.12″N 22°24′24.12″E
  - elevation: 1,060 m (3,480 ft)
- Mouth
  - location: Danube
  - coordinates: 43°49′13.08″N 22°55′40.08″E
  - elevation: 30 m (98 ft)
- Length: 59 km (37 mi)
- Basin size: 365 km^{2} (141 sq mi)

Basin features
- Progression: Danube→ Black Sea

The Archar (Bulgarian: Арчар, pronounced [ɐrˈt͡ʃar]) or Archaritsa (Арчарица [ɐrˈt͡ʃarit͡sɐ]) is a river in the western Danubian Plain of northwestern Bulgaria and a right tributary of the Danube. It is 59 kilometres in length.

== Geography ==
The river takes its source at an altitude of 1,060 m, just 200 m east of the summit of Babin Zab (1,107 m) in the northwestern part of the Balkan Mountains. It initially flows eastwards in a forested mountain valley until the village of Rayanovtsi. The river then continues east through limestone terrain, forming a deep canyon-like valley with steep banks, in certain sections up to 100 metres high. In that section it receives its largest tributaries, including the Salashka reka. At the village of Ostrokaptsi the Archar bends to the northeast and at Vartop turns east. It flows into the Danube at an altitude of 30 m at the homonymous village.

Its drainage basin covers a territory of 365 km^{2} and is situated between the basins of the rivers Vidbol to the north, the Skomlya and the Lom to the southeast, and the Timok along the Babin Nos ridge to the southwest. The high water is in March–June and low water is in July–October. The average annual discharge at the village of Rabisha is 0.8 m^{3}/s and at the mouth reaches 1.57 m^{3}/s.

== Settlements and economy ==
The Archar flows entirely in Vidin Province. There are eight settlements along its course, seven villages and one town — Rayanovtsi and Rabisha in Belogradchik Municipality, Kladorub, Ostrokaptsi, Darzhanitsa, Archar and Dimovo (town) in Dimovo Municipality, and Vartop in Vidin Municipality. There three main roads along its course, a 2.7 km stretch of the first class I-1 road Vidin–Sofia–Kulata between the junction of Gara Makresh and Dimovo, a 6.4 km stretch of the third class III-1102 road between Dimovo and Kladorub, and a 4.3 km section of the third class III-1104 road between Kladorub and Rabosha. Its waters are utilized for irrigation.

At its confluence with the Danube are situated the ruins of the important Roman town of Ratiaria. Near its source in the vicinity of Rabisha is the Magura Cave containing cave paintings dated to 8000 year BC. The site is included in the UNESCO's tentative list of World Heritage. Close to the cave and less than 2 km north of the river is Lake Rabisha, the largest inland natural freshwater lake in Bulgaria.
