= Meade Islands =

Group of islands in Antarctica

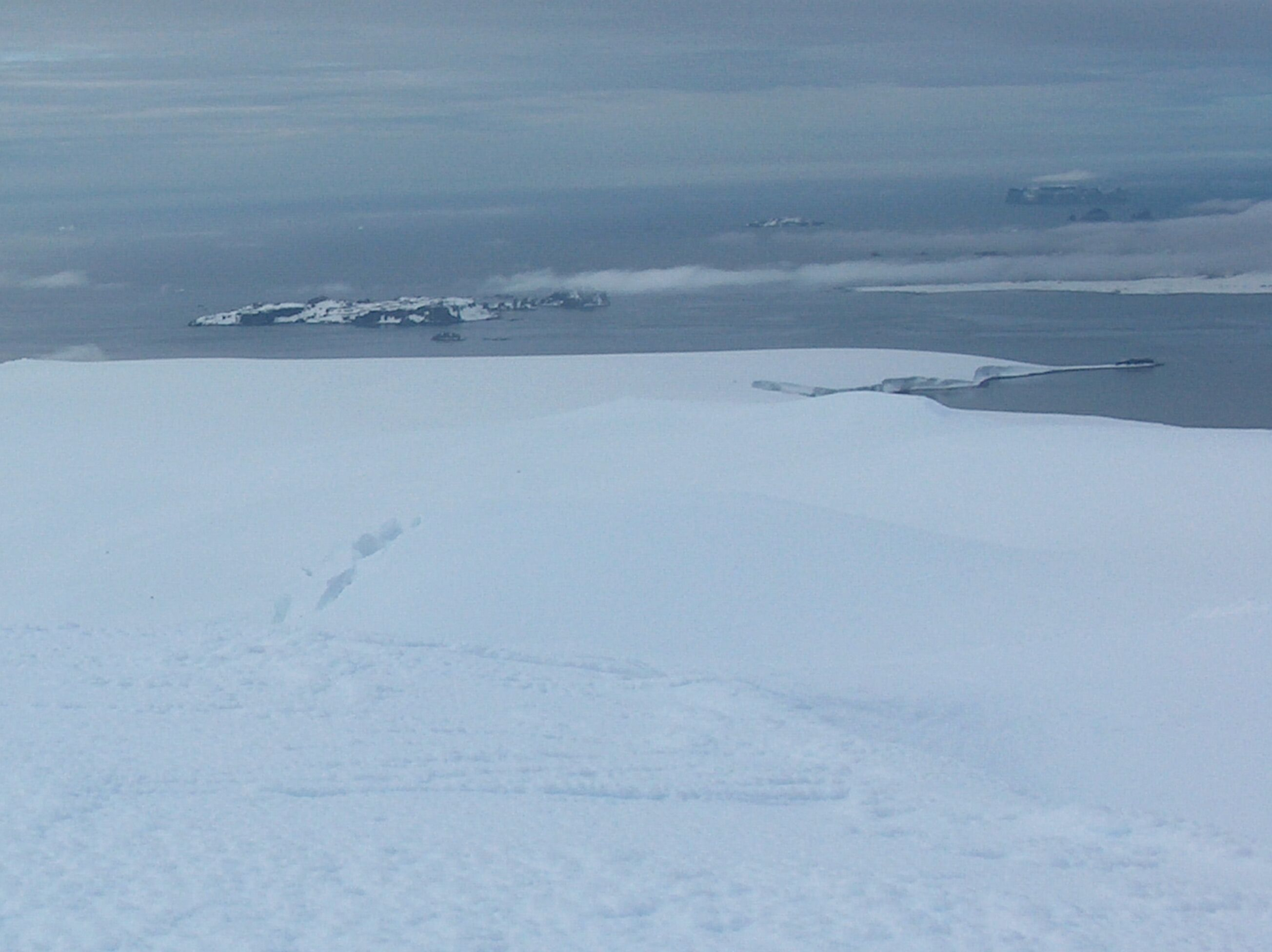
- Meade Islands (in the background) from Miziya Peak, Livingston Island

- Location within Antarctica Location within Antarctic Peninsula

Geography
- Location: Antarctica
- Coordinates: 62°27′04″S 60°04′03″W
- Archipelago: South Shetland Islands
- Area: 66 ha (160 acres)

Administration
- Administered under the Antarctic Treaty System

Demographics
- Population: Uninhabited

Topographic map of Livingston Island, Greenwich, Robert, Snow and Smith Islands.

The Meade Islands are a group of two large islands, Zverino Island and Cave Island, the minor Pisanitsa Island, and several rocks lying in the north entrance to McFarlane Strait, off Archar Peninsula, Greenwich Island in the South Shetland Islands, Antarctica. The surface areas of the first two islands are 48 hectares (120 acres) and 18 hectares (44 acres). respectively. The area was visited by early 19th-century sealers.

The islands were charted in 1935 by Discovery Investigations and named after C.M. Meade, Cartographer-in-charge in the Admiralty Hydrographic Office at that time.

== Location ==
The midpoint of the group is located at 62°27′04.4″S 60°04′03″W which is 1.98 km (1.23 mi) west of Duff Point, Greenwich Island, 3.73 km (2.32 mi) north of Pomorie Point, 3.5 km (2.2 mi) east of Williams Point, 4 km (2.5 mi) southeast of Zed Islands and 3.9 km (2.4 mi) south-southeast of Pyramid Island (British mapping in 1935 and 1968, Chilean in 1971, Argentine in 1980, Spanish in 1991, and Bulgarian in 2005 and 2009).

== See also ==
- Composite Antarctic Gazetteer
- List of Antarctic islands south of 60° S
- SCAR
- Territorial claims in Antarctica

== Map ==
- L.L. Ivanov et al. Antarctica: Livingston Island and Greenwich Island, South Shetland Islands. Scale 1:100000 topographic map. Sofia: Antarctic Place-names Commission of Bulgaria, 2005.
