= Zverino Island =

Island in the South Shetland Islands, Antarctica

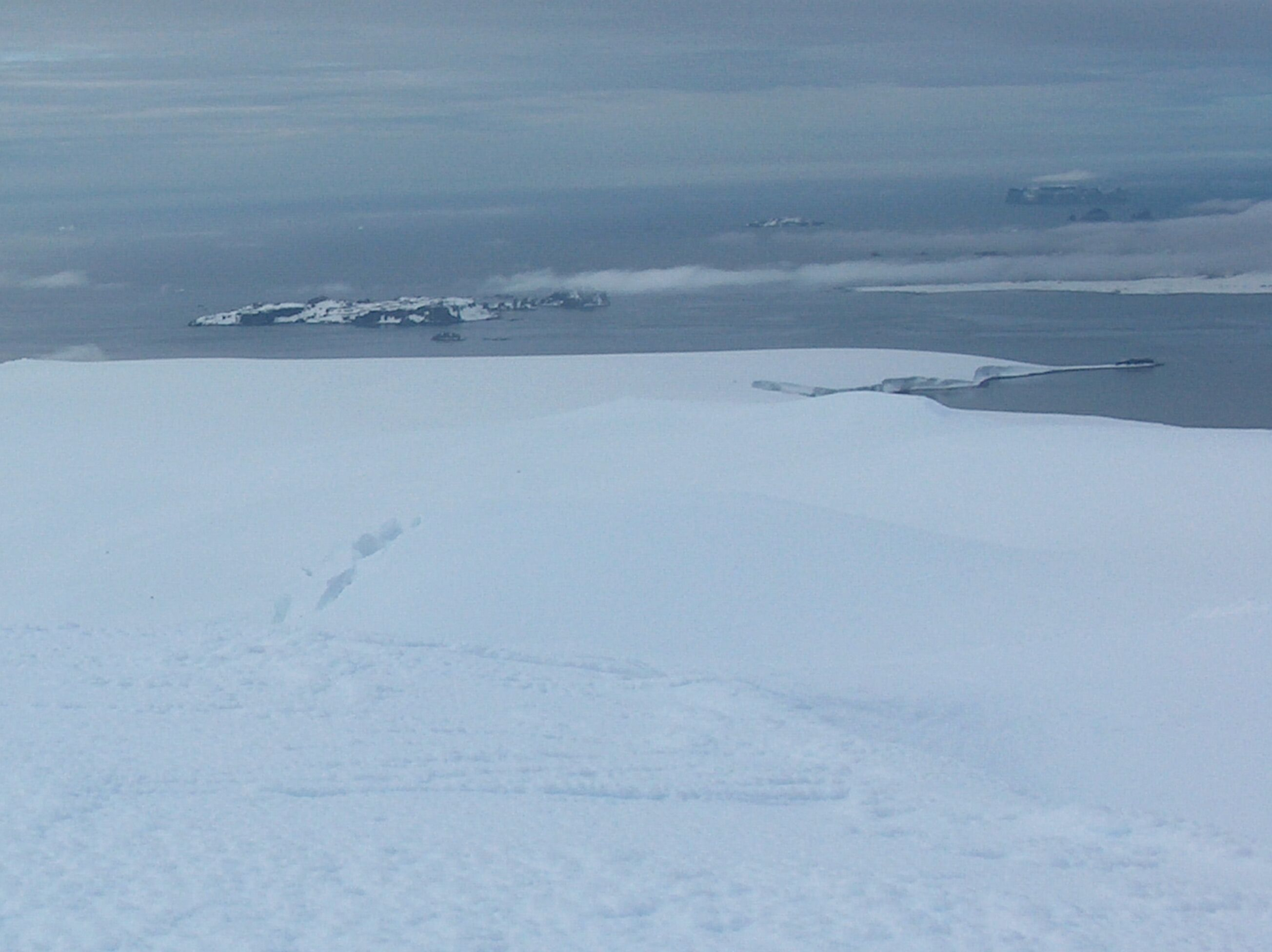
- Zverino Island (in the background, on the left) from Miziya Peak, Livingston Island

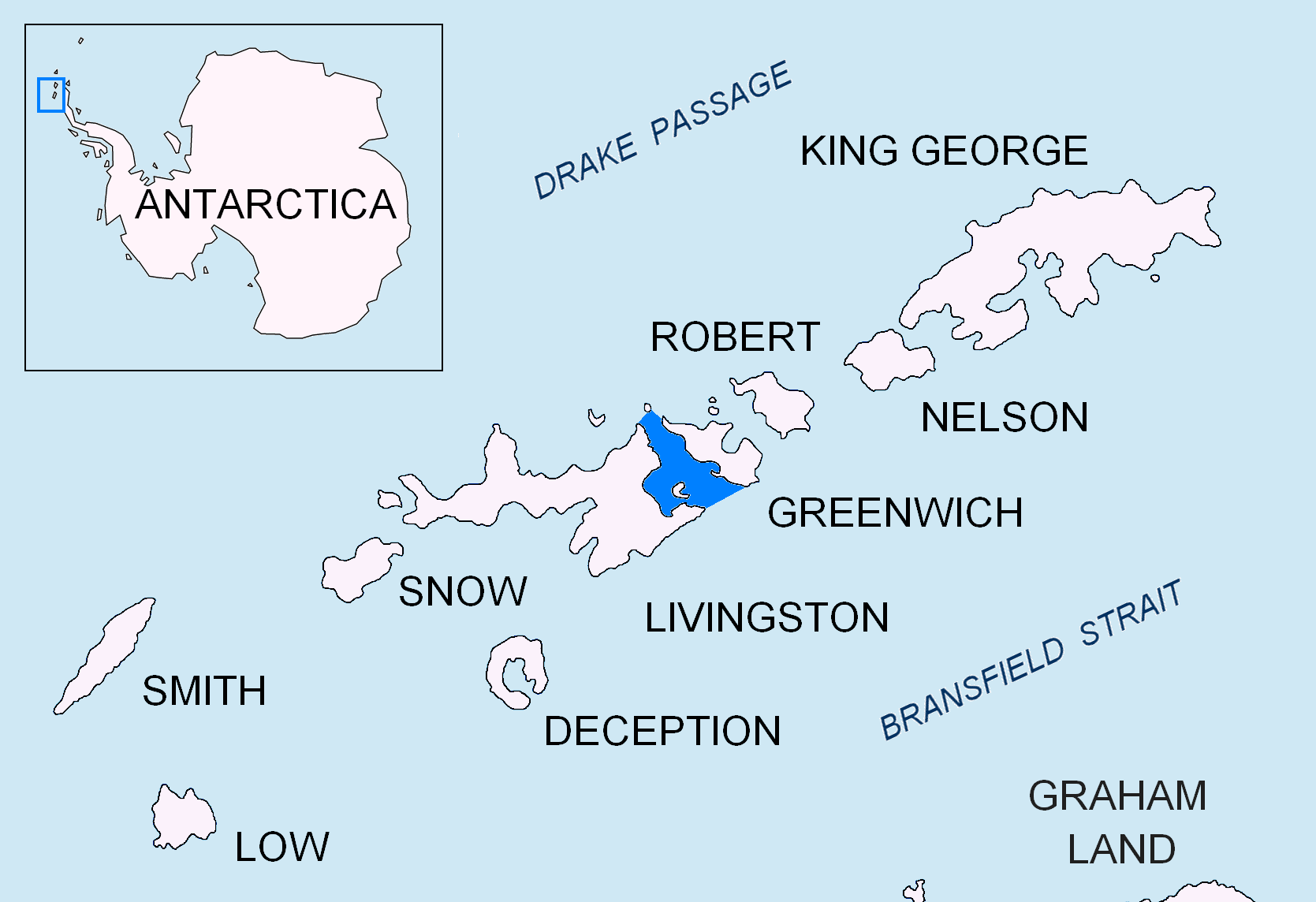
- Location of McFarlane-Strait in the South Shetland Islands

- Location on Antarctic Peninsula Location in Antarctica

Geography
- Location: Antarctica
- Coordinates: 62°27′09″S 60°04′25″W

Administration
- Administered under the Antarctic Treaty System

Demographics
- Population: Uninhabited

Zverino Island (Bulgarian: остров Зверино, romanized: ostrov Zverino, IPA: [ˈɔstrov zvɛriˈnɔ]) is the largest and westernmost island in the Meade group lying in the north entrance to McFarlane Strait in the South Shetland Islands, Antarctica. It is extending 1.2 km (0.75 mi) by 700 m (2,300 ft), with surface area of 48 hectares (120 acres), and is snow-free in summer.

The island is named after the settlement of Zverino in Western Bulgaria.

== Location ==
Zverino Island is located is 2.4 km (1.5 mi) east of Williams Point and 2.1 km (1.3 mi) northeast of Ficheto Point on Livingston Island, 1.9 km (1.2 mi) west of Duff Point on Greenwich Island, and is separated from neighbouring Cave Island to the east-northeast by the 110-metre (360 ft) wide Glogovo Passage. British mapping in 1935 and 1968, Chilean in 1971, Argentine in 1980, Spanish in 1991, and Bulgarian in 2005 and 2009.

== Maps ==
- L.L. Ivanov et al. Antarctica: Livingston Island and Greenwich Island, South Shetland Islands. Scale 1:100000 topographic map. Sofia: Antarctic Place-names Commission of Bulgaria, 2005.
- L.L. Ivanov. Antarctica: Livingston Island and Greenwich, Robert, Snow and Smith Islands. Scale 1:120000 topographic map. Troyan: Manfred Wörner Foundation, 2010. ISBN 978-954-92032-9-5 (First edition 2009. ISBN 978-954-92032-6-4)
- Antarctic Digital Database (ADD). Scale 1:250000 topographic map of Antarctica. Scientific Committee on Antarctic Research (SCAR). Since 1993, regularly upgraded and updated.
- L.L. Ivanov. Antarctica: Livingston Island and Smith Island. Scale 1:100000 topographic map. Manfred Wörner Foundation, 2017. ISBN 978-619-90008-3-0

Topographic map of Livingston Island featuring Zverino Island

== See also ==
- List of Antarctic and subantarctic islands
