= Razlog Cove =

Cove in the South Shetland Islands, Antarctica

Location of Greenwich Island in the South Shetland Islands.

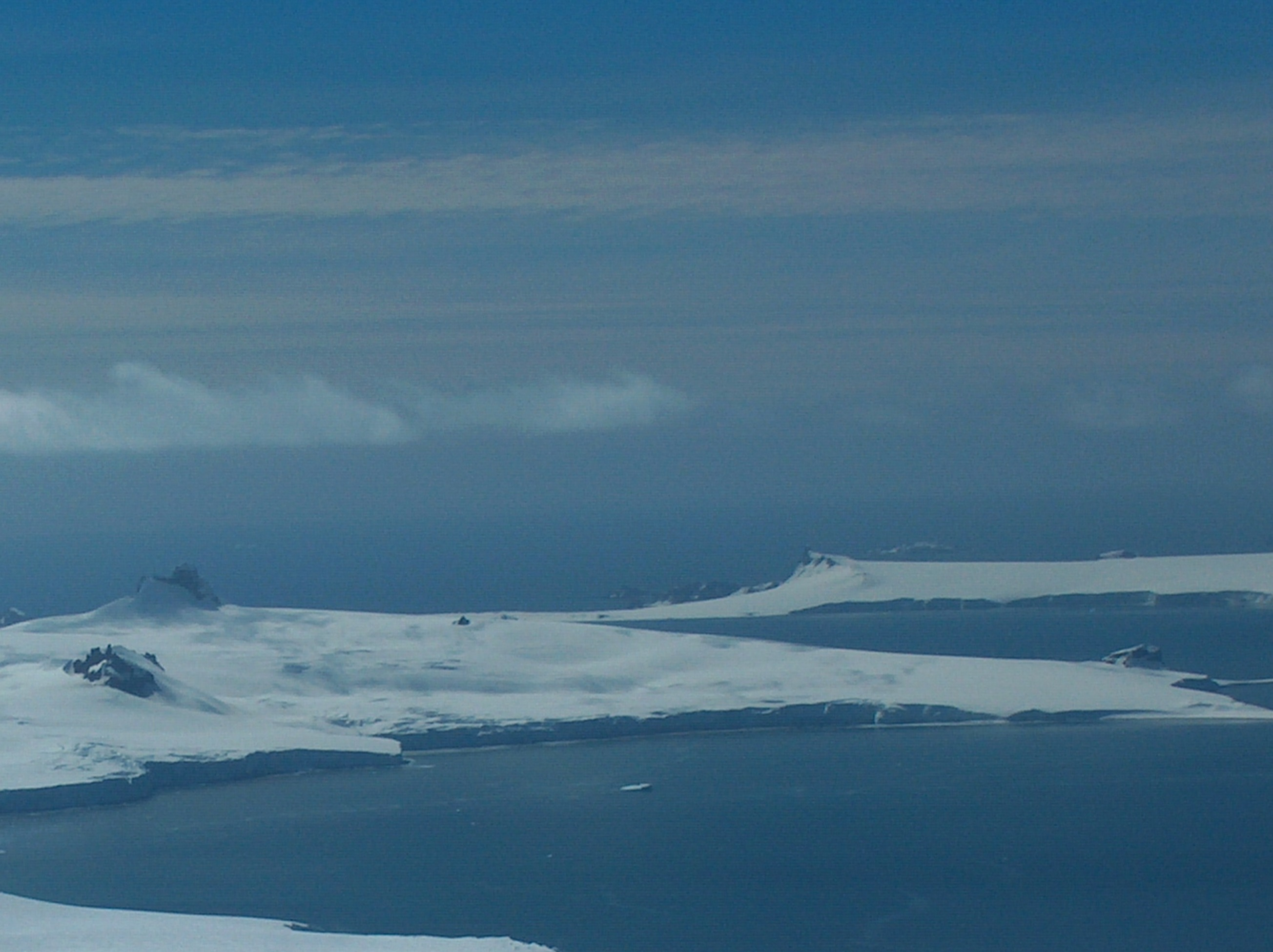
Razlog Cove on the far side of Greenwich Island in the background.

Topographic map of Livingston Island, Greenwich, Robert, Snow and Smith Islands.

Razlog Cove (Bulgarian: Разложки залив, romanized: Razlozhki zaliv, IPA: [rɐzˈɫɔʃki ˈzalif]) is a 2.1 km wide cove indenting for 1.7 km the north coast of Greenwich Island in the South Shetland Islands, Antarctica. It is bounded by Archar Peninsula to the south, and Express Island to the northeast, and is entered between Duff Point and the northern extremity of Express Island.

The cove is named after the town of Razlog in southwestern Bulgaria.

== Location ==
Razlog Cove is centred at 62°26′50″S 60°00′00″W.

== Maps ==
- L.L. Ivanov et al. Antarctica: Livingston Island and Greenwich Island, South Shetland Islands. Scale 1:100000 topographic map. Sofia: Antarctic Place-names Commission of Bulgaria, 2005.
- L.L. Ivanov. Antarctica: Livingston Island and Greenwich, Robert, Snow and Smith Islands. Scale 1:120000 topographic map. Troyan: Manfred Wörner Foundation, 2009. ISBN 978-954-92032-6-4
