= Rusokastro =

- Village
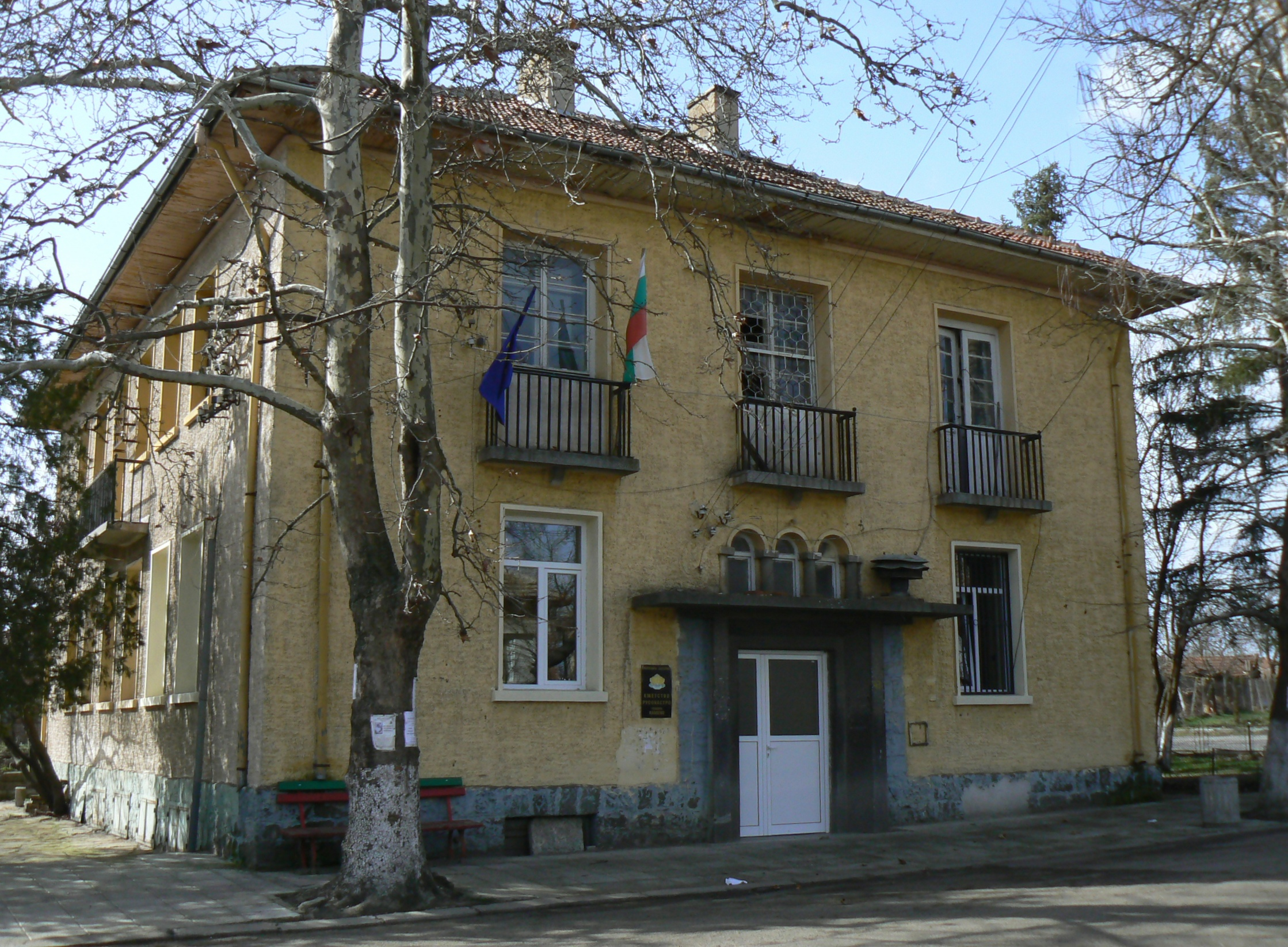
- Mayor's office

- Location within Bulgaria
- Coordinates: 42°28′N 27°11′E
- Country: Bulgaria
- Province: Burgas Province
- Municipality: Kameno Municipality
- Time zone: UTC+2 (EET)
  - Summer (DST): UTC+3 (EEST)

Rusokastro (from Greek Ρουσόκαστρο) is a village in Kameno Municipality, in Burgas Province, in southeastern Bulgaria.

Rusokastro Rock in Antarctica is named after the village.
