= Express Island =

Island in the South Shetland Islands

- Location of Greenwich Island in the South Shetland Islands

- Location within Antarctic Peninsula Location within Antarctica

Geography
- Location: South Shetland Islands; Antarctica
- Coordinates: Earth 62°26′35″S 59°59′23″W
- Archipelago: South Shetland Islands
- Area: 29 ha (72 acres)
- Length: 1 km (0.6 mi)

Administration
- Administered under the Antarctic Treaty System

Demographics
- Population: Uninhabited

Express Island is a narrow and craggy island, 1.23 kilometres (0.76 mi) long, lying close offshore of northwest Greenwich Island in the South Shetland Islands, Antarctica. It is situated due north of Greaves Peak, forming most of the east side of Razlog Cove. Surface area 29 hectares (72 acres).

It was named by the UK Antarctic Place-Names Committee in 1977 after the American schooner Express (Capt. Ephraim Williams), one of the ships in the sealing fleet of Edmund Fanning and Benjamin Pendleton from Stonington, Connecticut, which operated in this area, 1820–21.

== See also ==
- Composite Gazetteer of Antarctica
- Greenwich Island (South Shetland Islands)
- List of Antarctic islands south of 60° S
- Scientific Committee on Antarctic Research
- Territorial claims in Antarctica

== Map ==
- L.L. Ivanov et al. Antarctica: Livingston Island and Greenwich Island, South Shetland Islands. Scale 1:100000 topographic map. Sofia: Antarctic Place-names Commission of Bulgaria, 2005.
