= Skomlya =

Location
- Country: Bulgaria

Physical characteristics
- Source
  - location: Pre-Balkan
  - coordinates: 43°38′48.12″N 22°41′25.08″E
  - elevation: 560 m (1,840 ft)
- Mouth
  - location: Danube
  - coordinates: 43°47′49.92″N 22°59′35.16″E
  - elevation: 29 m (95 ft)
- Length: 42 km (26 mi)
- Basin size: 163 km^{2} (63 sq mi)

Basin features
- Progression: Danube→ Black Sea

The Skomlya (Bulgarian: Скомля) is a river in northwestern Bulgaria, a right tributary of the Danube. Its length is 42 km.

The river takes its source at an altitude of 560 m in the Belogradchishki Venets ridge of the Pre-Balkan range, close to the road Gara Oreshets–Belogradchik. It flows in the western Danubian Plain in general direction northeast throughout its whole course. Between the villages of Dalgo Pole and Septemvriytsi its valley is canyon-like. It then crosses the Orsoy Plain and flows into the Danube at an altitude of 29 m.

Its drainage basin covers a territory of 163 km^{2} and is situated between the basins of the rivers Archar to the northwest and Lom to the southeast. The river has predominantly snow–rain feed.

The Skomlya flows entirely in Vidin Province. There are three settlements along its course, the villages of Gara Oreshets, Skomlya and Septemvriytsi, all of them in Dimovo Municipality. It waters are utilized for irrigation.
