= Vlaykova Cinema =

Cinema and cultural hub in the city of Sofia, Bulgaria

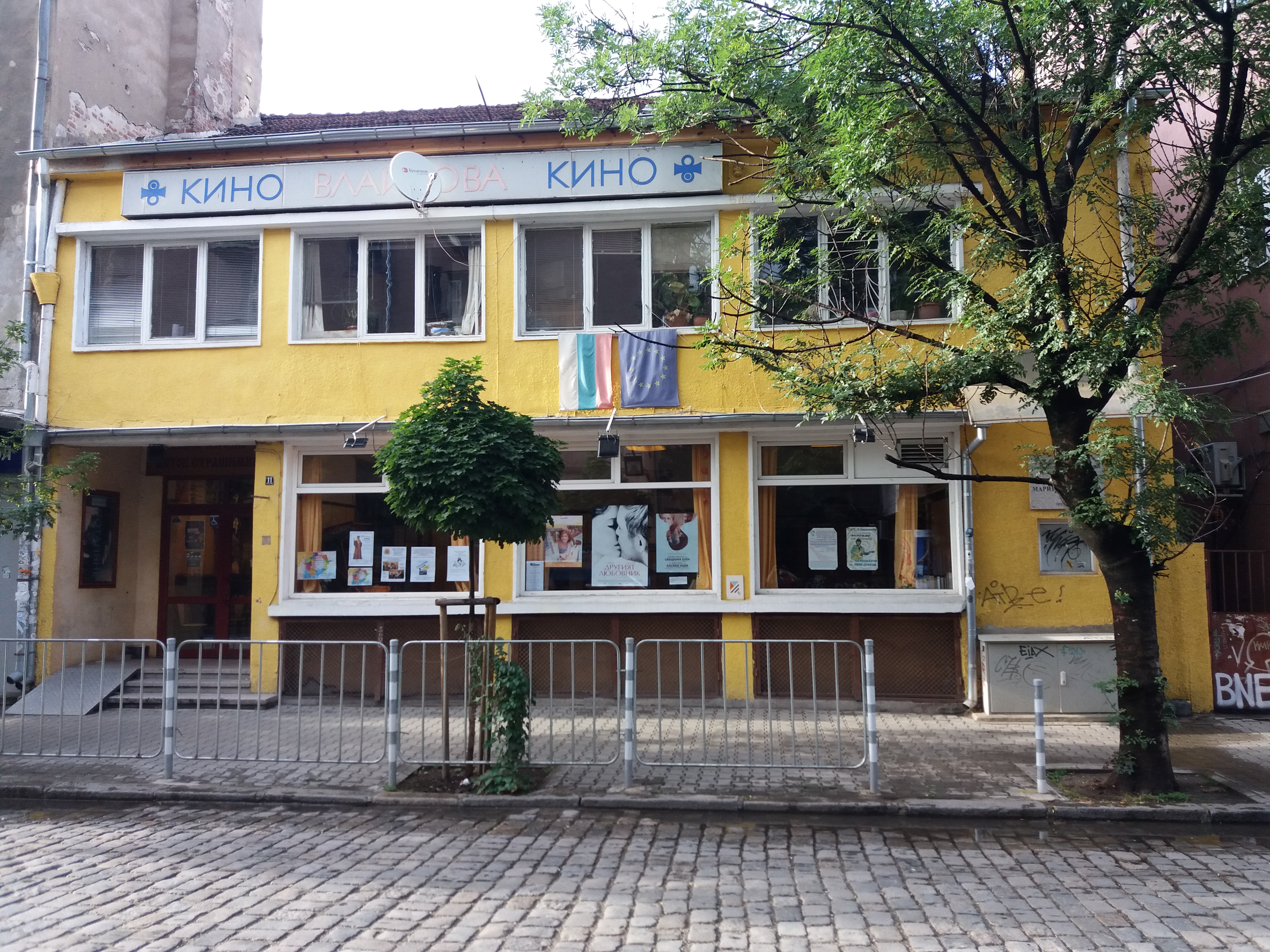
- Interactive map of Vlaykova Cinema
- Address: Sofia, Bulgaria
- Coordinates: 42°41′25″N 23°20′26″E
- Type: Cinema

Construction
- Built: 1925

Vlaykova Cinema is a cinema and cultural hub in Sofia, Bulgaria. The cinema is seen as one of the cultural treasures of Sofia. It is named after Maria and Todor Vlaykov, who paid for the cinema's construction.

== History ==
In 1925 Maria and Todor Vlaykov started the construction of the building on their own site with an area of 465m². For the construction, both spouses mortgaged their homes and accumulated serious debts. One of them amounted to BGN 250,000. At the end of 1925 Maria Vlaykova reported to the Ministry of Public Education that she wished to provide free the salon of charge, which would be ready in the spring of the next year. The donation was formed a few months later by a will, and its conditions were that after her death the salon will be owned by the Ministry, and the proceeds will be used to finance the education abroad of six of the most talented Bulgarian artists, three of whom were from Macedonia. After the death of Maria Vlaykova in 1926, the donation was adopted by law, which regulates the transfer of ownership to the Ministry of Education, as well as the completion of its construction and coverage of mortgage debt.

During the bombing of Sofia on March 29–30, 1944, the cinema burned down along with the inventory. The tenant Stilyan Georgiev restored the building in the same year with his own funds, investing BGN 710,177. In 1944, the cinema began to function again, but was requisitioned by the Sofia Military Command for the needs of the army. Later, Stilyan Georgiev spent another BGN 408,400 for the reconstruction of the stage and for additional repairs.

== Description ==
The hall is built on an area of 330 m^{2}, it has 400 seats, a stage and four small dressing rooms. A second floor is planned for a community center. This idea was realized when in 1945 the second floor was given to the Chitalishte "Anton Strashimirov".
