= Todor Vlaykov National Literary Prize =

- Awarded for: Contribution to literature in Bulgaria
- Presented by: Municipal Council of Pirdop
- Status: Currently awarded
- Established: 2007
- Total: 10

The Todor Vlaykov National Literary Prize is a Bulgarian literary award that was established by a decision of the Pirdop Municipal Council in 2007.

It is named after famed Bulgarian literary figure Todor Vlaykov.

The award is presented every two years (according to the statute) during 'Vlaykov Day' in Pirdop, usually held around May 24. It consists of a statuette depicting the full-length figure of Todor Vlaykov (the designer of the sculpture is Ivan Lyubenov), as well as a cash prize of BGN 1,000.

== Recipients ==
- 2007 - Kancho Kozhuharov for the short story "The Relic"
- 2008 - Mihail Nedelchev for overall contribution to the study of the work and social and political activities of Todor Vlaykov, for the continuation of the traditions of radical democracy in Bulgaria, as well as for the restoration of the magazine "Democratic Review".
- 2010 - Georgi Danailov - for overall creativity
- 2012 - Alexander Hristov for the story "Africa", Olya Stoyanova for the story "Two loaves and a box of cigarettes", Ivan Dimitrov for the novel Promise of Summer and Dimitrinka Nenova for the work "When the heart speaks".
- 2015 - Ivan Granitski for overall contribution
- 2017 - Simeon Yanev for overall contribution
- 2019 - Neda Antonova - for overall creativity
