= Cave Island =

Island in Antarctica

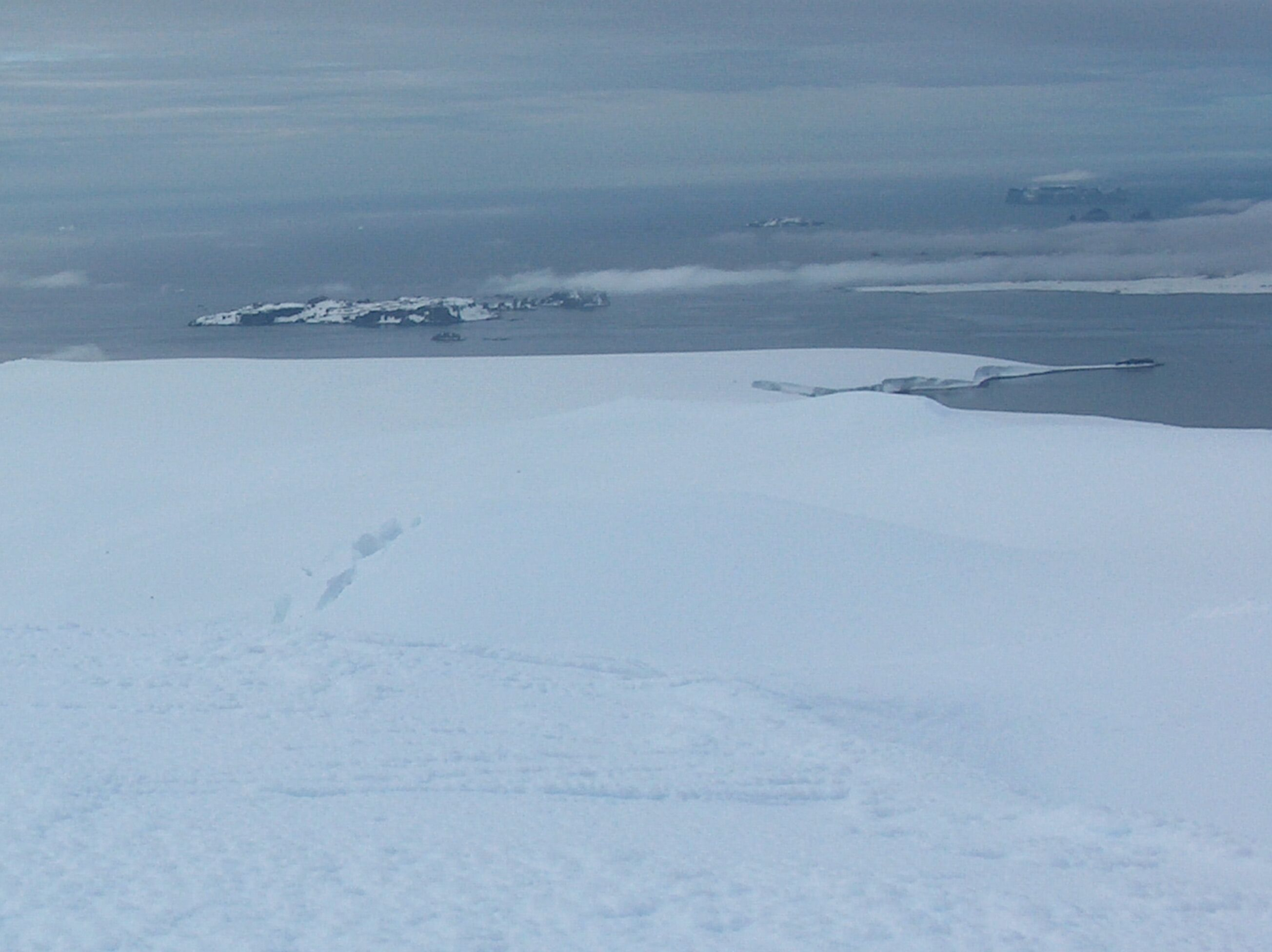
- Meade Islands (in the background, Cave Island is on the right) from Miziya Peak, Livingston Island

- Location within Antarctica Location within Antarctic Peninsula

Geography
- Location: Antarctica
- Coordinates: 62°26′55″S 60°3′40″W

Administration
- Administered under the Antarctic Treaty System

Demographics
- Population: Uninhabited

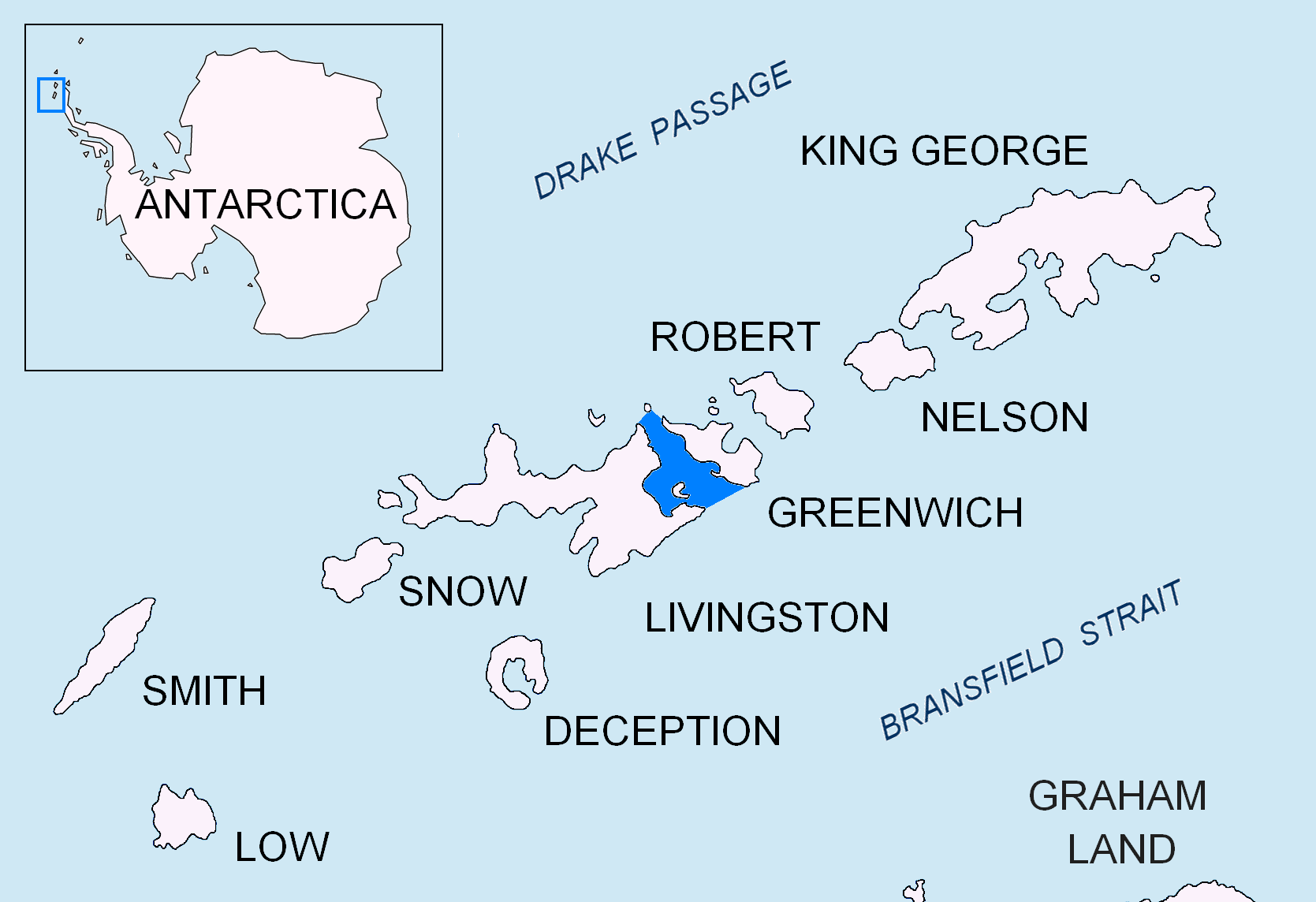
Location of McFarlane Strait in the South Shetland Islands

Topographic map of Livingston Island, Greenwich, Robert, Snow and Smith Islands

Cave Island is an island marked by a large cavern in its south side, which is the second largest of the Meade Islands lying in the north entrance to McFarlane Strait, off Archar Peninsula on Greenwich Island in the South Shetland Islands. It is separated from neighbouring Zverino Island to the west-southwest by the 110 m wide Glogovo Passage.

The name Cave Rock appears to have been applied by DI personnel on the Discovery II who charted the feature in 1935.

== See also ==
- List of Antarctic and sub-Antarctic islands

== Maps ==
- L.L. Ivanov et al. Antarctica: Livingston Island and Greenwich Island, South Shetland Islands. Scale 1:100000 topographic map. Sofia: Antarctic Place-names Commission of Bulgaria, 2005.
- L.L. Ivanov. Antarctica: Livingston Island and Greenwich, Robert, Snow and Smith Islands. Scale 1:120000 topographic map. Troyan: Manfred Wörner Foundation, 2009. ISBN 978-954-92032-6-4
