= Radko Vlaykov =

Bulgarian diplomat and Ambassador to Serbia

Radko Todorov Vlaykov
- Born: April 29, 1956 (age 70); Sofia, Bulgaria
- Education: University of National and World Economy
- Occupations: Diplomat, Journalist.

Radko Todorov Vlaykov is a Bulgarian diplomat, engaged in scientific and journalistic activities. Since 2016 he has been the Ambassador of Bulgaria in Belgrade.

== Biography ==
Radko Vlaykov was born on April 29, 1956, in Sofia, People's Republic of Bulgaria. He is the great-grandson of politician and writer Todor Vlaykov.

In 1981 he graduated from the University of National and World Economy in Sofia and became a Master of International Relations in the first class of this specialty in Bulgaria. From 1981 to 1991 he was engaged in scientific and journalistic activities.

In 2001 he married Muravei Radev's daughter - Joanna, who for some time was a correspondent for the newspaper "Democracy" in Plovdiv. They have 3 children.

=== Diplomatic career ===
In 1991, after the removal of Communism in Bulgaria, he joined the Ministry of Foreign Affairs as a diplomat. In the period August 1991 - March 1994 he was a counselor at the Embassy of the Republic of Bulgaria in Czechoslovakia, and after the division of the country at the Embassy in Prague (Czech Republic). In the period March 1994 - July 2001 he was Spokesman of the Ministry of Foreign Affairs. During the same period he was also the director of the Information Directorate and the Information and Public Relations Directorate at the Ministry of Foreign Affairs.

=== Ambassador to Serbia ===
In October 2016, he was appointed by the second government of Boyko Borissov as Ambassador Extraordinary and Plenipotentiary of the Republic of Bulgaria to Belgrade. As an ambassador, he works actively on issues related to the Bulgarian minority in Serbia. In 2017, he helped open an exhibition at the EU InfoCentre in Belgrade - Bosilegrad Before and Now - International Children's Easter Festival, held for the first time outside Bosilegrad, highlighting Serbia's values in moving towards the European Union. In April 2018, he participated in the 8th Round Table on "Presentation of a draft law amending the Law on National Councils of National Minorities".
