= Pyramid Island, South Shetland Islands =

Island in the South Shetland Islands, Antarctica

Pyramid Island
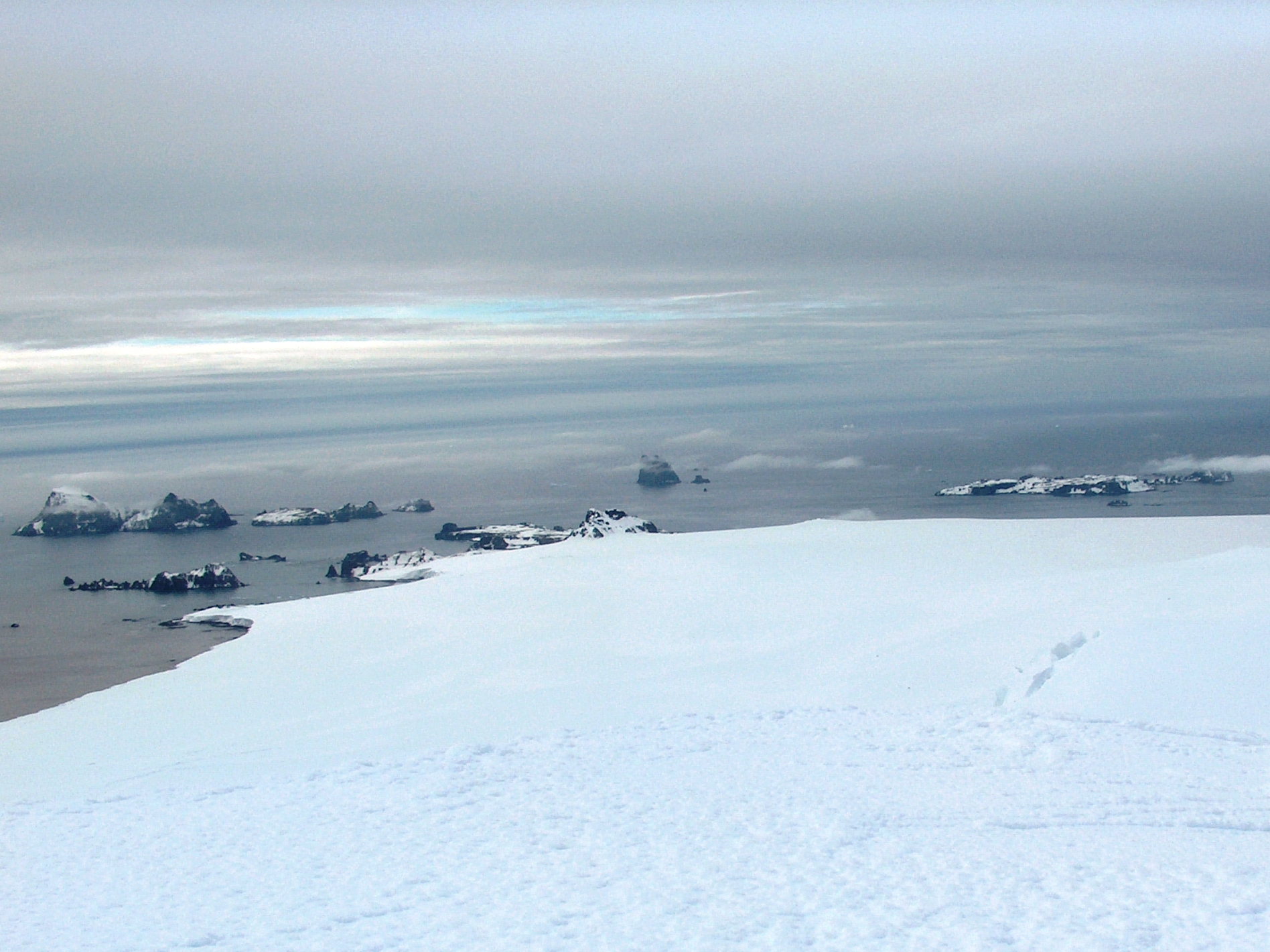
- Pyramid Island (in the central background) from Miziya Peak, Livingston Island with Cone Rock in front of the islet adjacent to Pyramid Island, and Zed Islands on the left and Meade Islands on the right.

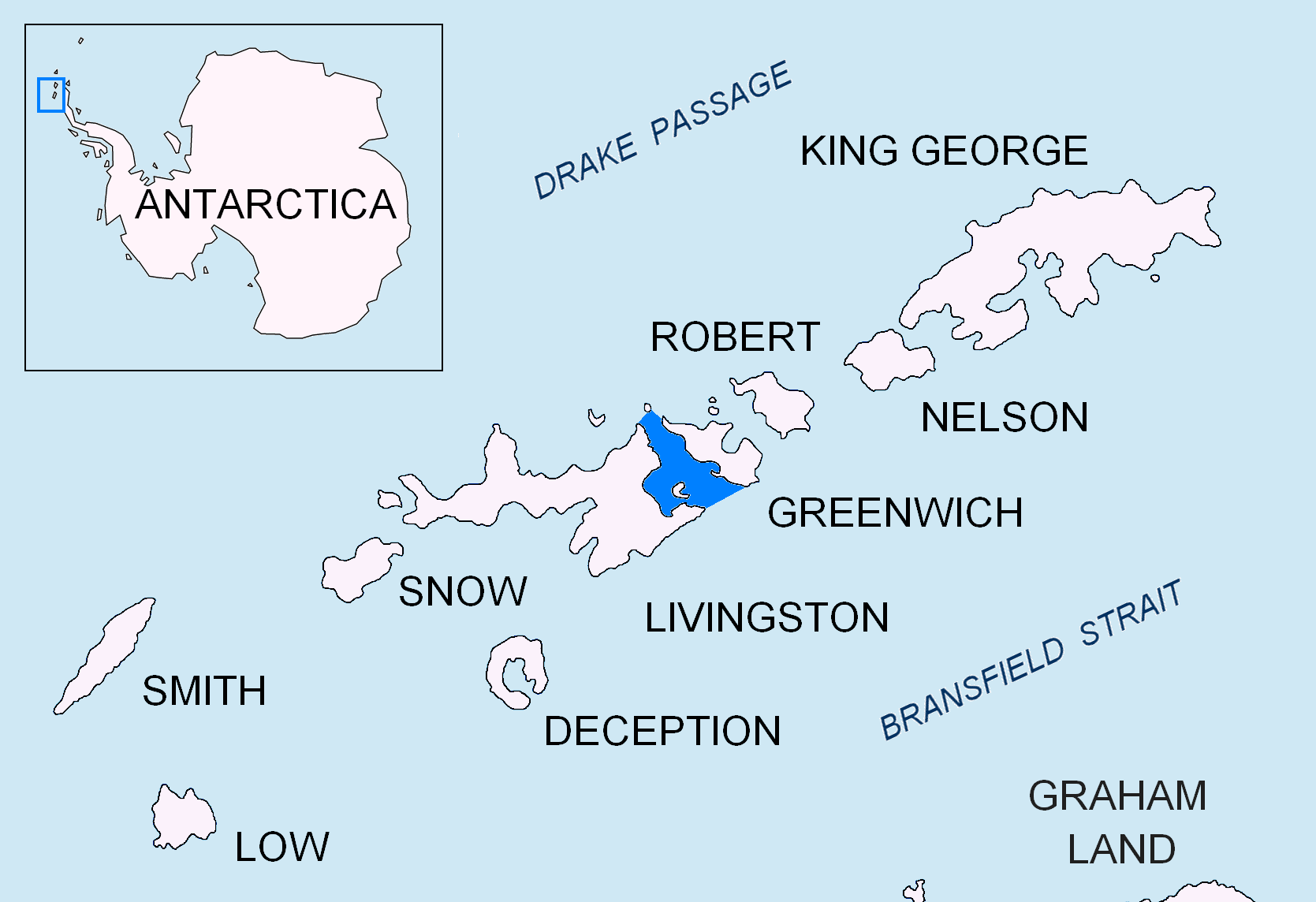
- Location of McFarlane Strait in the South Shetland Islands

- Location on Antarctic Peninsula Location in Antarctica

Geography
- Location: Antarctica
- Coordinates: 62°25′09.9″S 60°05′59.2″W
- Archipelago: South Shetland Islands
- Area: 9 ha (22 acres)
- Highest elevation: 205 m (673 ft)

Administration
- Antarctica
- Administered under the Antarctic Treaty System

Demographics
- Population: 0

Pyramid Island is a conspicuous, pillar-shaped rocky island rising to 205 m (673 ft) off the north entrance to McFarlane Strait in the South Shetland Islands, Antarctica. Its surface area is 9 hectares (22 acres). Cone Rock
(62°25′56.9″S 60°06′08.3″W) is rising to 6 m (19.7 ft) 1.33 km (0.83 mi) south of the island,
2.03 km (1.26 mi) north-northwest of Meade Islands, 2.8 km (1.7 mi) northeast of Williams Point and
1.65 km (1.03 mi) east of Koshava Island, Zed Islands. The vicinity of Pyramid Island was visited on 19 February 1819 during the discovery of the South Shetlands by Captain William Smith in the British brig Williams, and later by early 19th century sealers.

Both the island and the rock were charted and descriptively named by Discovery Investigations personnel in 1935.

== Location ==
Pyramid Island is located at 62°25′09.9″S 60°05′59.2″W which is 4.8 km (3.0 mi) northwest of Duff Point, Greenwich Island, 3.36 km (2.09 mi) north by west of Meade Islands, 3.78 km (2.35 mi) north-northeast of Williams Point and 1.76 km (1.09 mi) northeast of Koshava Island, Zed Islands (British mapping in 1820, 1935, 1948 and 1968, Argentine in 1948 and 1954, Chilean in 1971, Spanish in 1991, and Bulgarian in 2005 and 2009).

Topographic map of Livingston Island, Greenwich, Robert, Snow and Smith Islands

== See also ==
- Composite Antarctic Gazetteer
- List of Antarctic islands south of 60° S
- SCAR
- Territorial claims in Antarctica

== Map ==
- L.L. Ivanov et al. Antarctica: Livingston Island and Greenwich Island, South Shetland Islands. Scale 1:100000 topographic map. Sofia: Antarctic Place-names Commission of Bulgaria, 2005.
