= Kladorub =

- Location of Kladorub
- Coordinates: 43°42′N 22°42′E
- Country: Bulgaria
- Provinces (Oblast): Vidin

Government
  - Mayor: Todor Todorov
- Elevation: 193 m (633 ft)

Population (2008)
  - Total: 49
- Time zone: UTC+2 (EET)
  - Summer (DST): UTC+3 (EEST)
- Postal Code: 3758
- Area code: 09341

Kladorub (Bulgarian: Кладоруб [kɫɐdoˈrup]) is a village in northwestern Bulgaria.

It is located in Vidin region, Dimovo Municipality.

== Geography ==
Archar river floats near the village.

== History ==
Kladorub lies upon the remains of an ancient village. The name of that village - Conbustica, is marked on the Roman road map Tabula Peutengiriana as a point, located on the road from Ratiaria (current Archar) to Naisos (current Niš).

There also lies the remains of an ancient Roman war camp. There, in the first years of the Roman occupation, a stone fortification had been built.

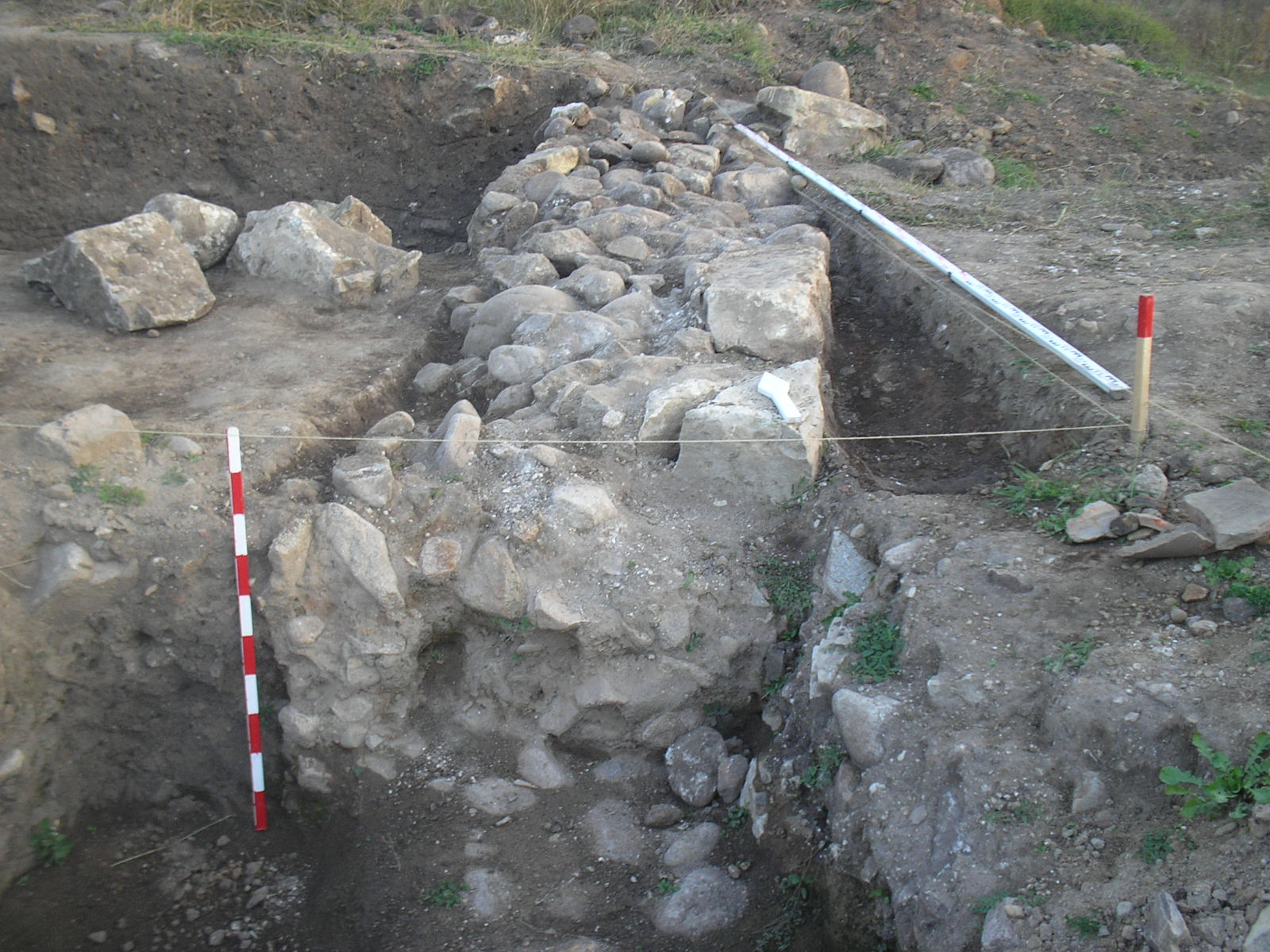
Wall of a Roman camp

Many Roman ceramics and metal objects have been found in excavations near the village.

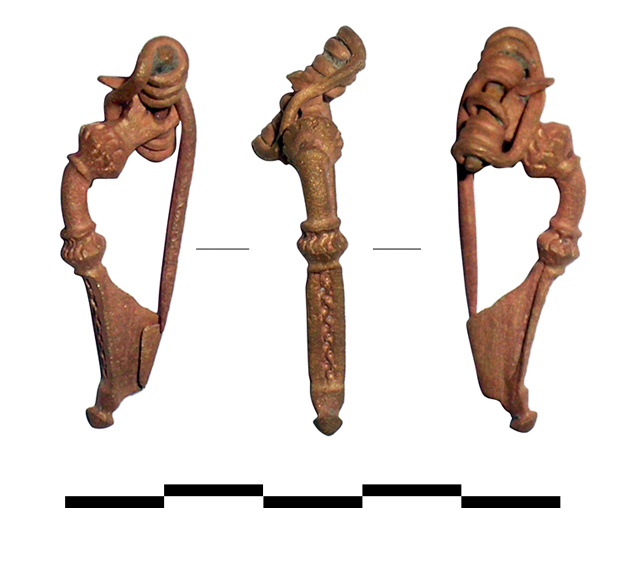
Fibula from the 2nd century

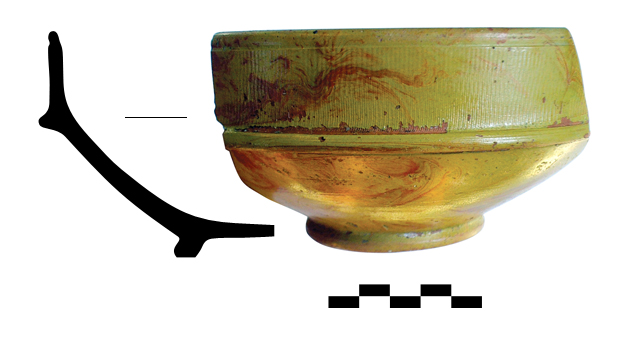
Roman ceramics

== Cultural and Natural sights ==
The Magura cave is located 6 kilometers west of the village.

The Belogradchik rocks are located 18 kilometers from Kladorub.

== Honour ==
Kladorub Glacier on Nordenskjöld Coast in Graham Land, Antarctica is named after the village.
