= Todor Vlaykov =

Bulgarian writer, public figure and politician

Todor Genchov Vlaykov
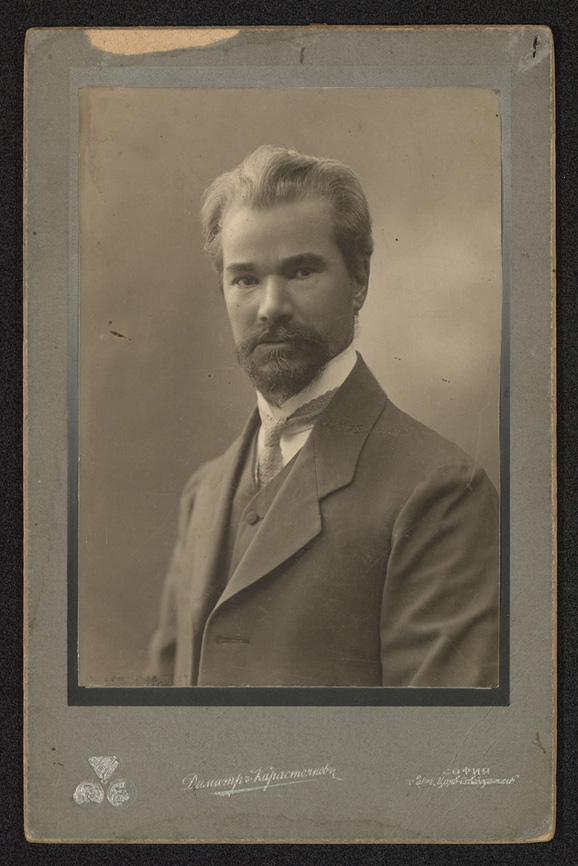
- Born: 13 February 1865; Pirdop, Ottoman Empire
- Died: 28 April 1943 (aged 78); Sofia, Bulgaria
- Education: University of National and World Economy
- Occupations: Writer, Politician.

Todor Genchov Vlaykov (13 February 1865 – 28 April 1943), also known by his pseudonym Veselin, was a Bulgarian writer, public figure and politician. His most famous work is the story "Grandfather Slavchova's Granddaughter". His great-grandson is the diplomat Radko Vlaykov.

== Biography ==
He was born on February 13, 1865, in the town of Pirdop. He graduated from the Faculty of History and Philology of Moscow University in 1888. He was the founder and chairman of the Bulgarian Teachers' Union. He was a full member of the BKD (now BAS) from 1900 onwards.

In 1890 Vlaykov and Todor Yonchev founded the first Bulgarian cooperative - Mirkovo Mutual Savings Agricultural Association "Oralo" in Mirkovo.

Vlaykov was one of the founders and the first leader of the Radical Democratic Party. At the founding of the Democratic Alliance in 1923, he participated in the group that drafted the first program of the new party.

== Legacy ==
In 1926, on the initiative of Vlaykov's wife, Maria Vlaykova, a building was opened to house a Cinema. Shortly after, the newly built cinema on Tsar Ivan Asen II Street was donated to the Ministry of Public Education, and a little later it was officially named the Vlaykova Cinema, in honour of Todor and his wife.

In 2007, with the decision of the Municipal Council of Pirdop, the Todor Vlaykov National Literary Prize was established.

== Bibliography ==
- "Aunt Gena" 1890
- "For Uncle Stayka" 1891
- "Ratay" 1892
- "Teacher Milenkov" 1894

Stories and Narratives 1897

- "Grandfather Slavchova's Granddaughter" (11th ed. - 1889, 1917, 1927, 1928, 1928 with the title "Two young people fell in love", 1941, 1946, 1978, 1985, 1989, 2004)
- "Strina Venkovica and her daughter-in-law" 1925
- "The Experience" 1934, 1939, 1942
- "Autumn" 1891
- "Unpleasant guest"
