= Dimovo Municipality =

Dimovo Municipality Община Димово
- Municipality
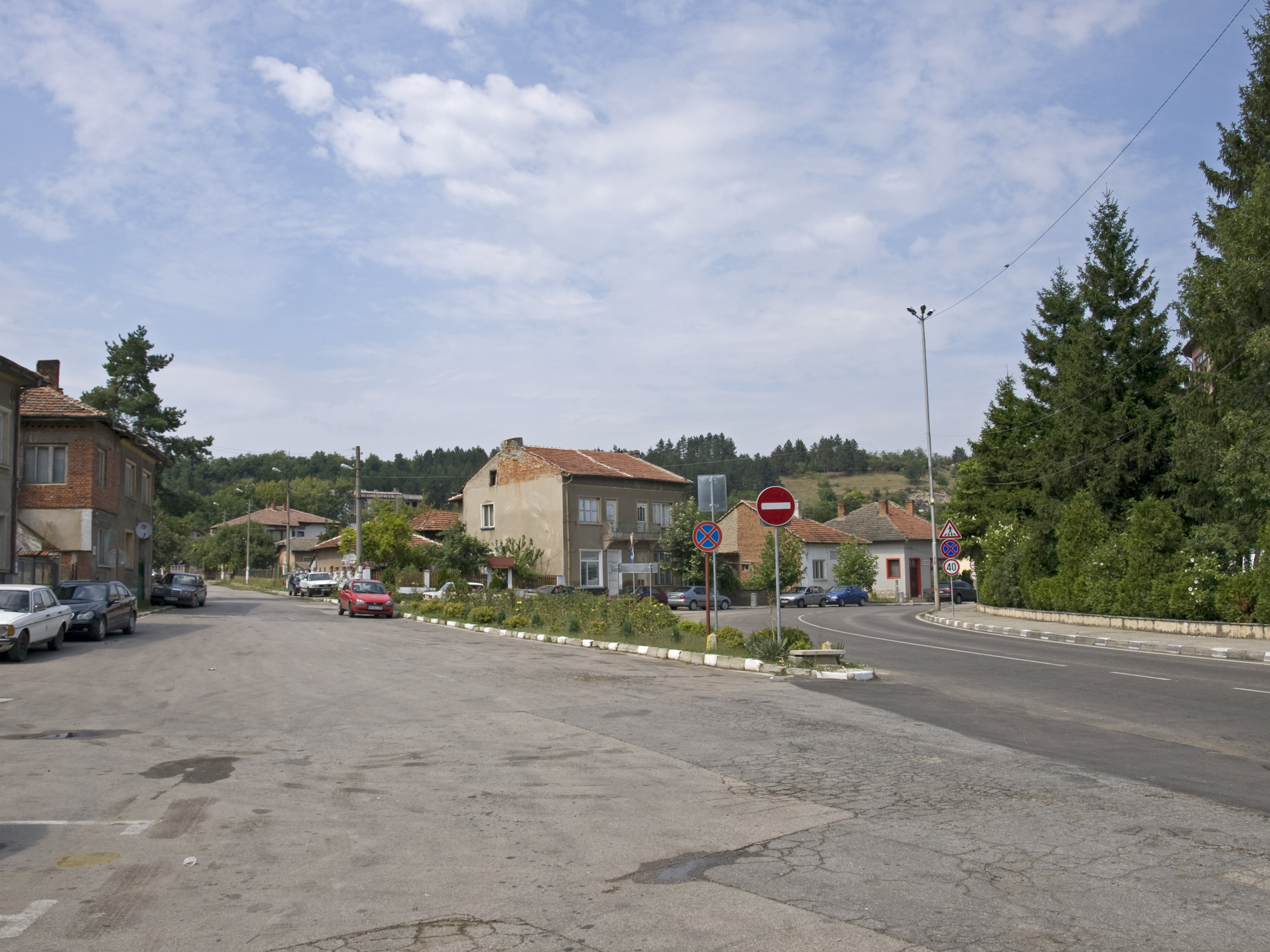
- E78 road in Dimovo

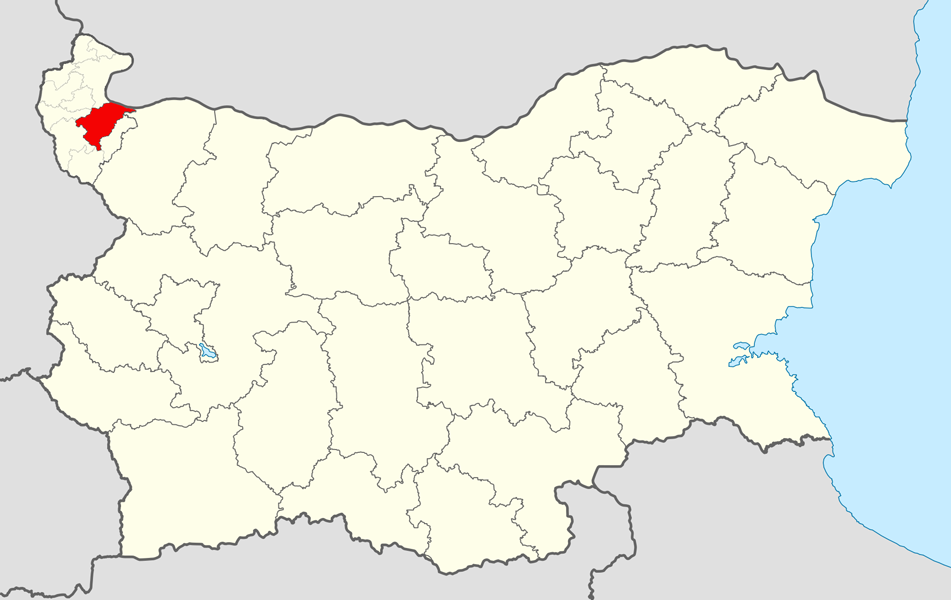
- Dimovo Municipality within Bulgaria and Vidin Province.
- Coordinates: 43°43′N 22°46′E
- Country: Bulgaria
- Province (Oblast): Vidin
- Admin. centre (Obshtinski tsentar): Dimovo

Area
  - Total: 402.87 km^{2} (155.55 sq mi)

Population (December 2009)
  - Total: 7,175
  - Density: 17.81/km^{2} (46.13/sq mi)
- Time zone: UTC+2 (EET)
  - Summer (DST): UTC+3 (EEST)

Dimovo Municipality (Bulgarian: Община Димово) is a municipality (obshtina) in Vidin Province, Northwestern Bulgaria, located along the right bank of Danube river in the Danubian Plain. It is named after its administrative centre - the town of Dimovo.

The municipality embraces a territory of 402.87 km^{2} (155.55 sq mi) with a population of 7,175 inhabitants, as of December 2009.

The main road E79 (I-1) crosses the area, connecting the province centre of Vidin with the city of Montana and respectively with the western operating part of Hemus motorway.

== Settlements ==
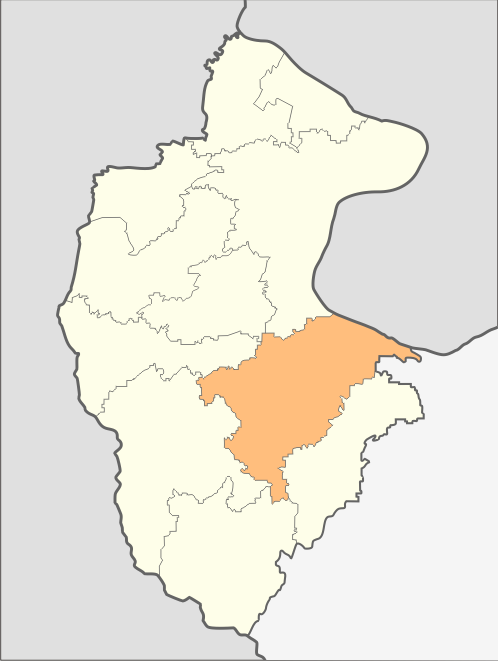
Dimovo Municipality within Vidin Province

Dimovo Municipality includes the following 23 places (towns are shown in bold):

Town/Village	Cyrillic	Population (December 2009)
**Dimovo**	**Димово**	1,211
Archar	Арчар	2,603
Bela	Бела	120
Dalgo Pole	Дълго поле	27
Darzhanitsa	Държаница	107
Gara Oreshets	Гара Орешец	819
Izvor	Извор	311
Karbintsi	Карбинци	241
Kladorub	Кладоруб	44
Kostichovtsi	Костичовци	114
Lagoshevtsi	Лагошевци	89
Mali Drenovets	Мали Дреновец	83
Medovnitsa	Медовница	327
Oreshets	Орешец	15
Ostrokaptsi	Острокапци	98
Septemvriytsi	Септемврийци	251
Skomlya	Скомля	43
Shipot	Шипот	76
Vladichentsi	Владиченци	80
Vodnyantsi	Воднянци	279
Varbovchets	Върбовчец	94
Yanyovets	Яньовец	33
Yarlovitsa	Ярловица	110
Total		7,175

== Demography ==
The following table shows the change of the population during the last four decades.

Dimovo Municipality
Year	1975	1985	1992	2001	2005	2007	2009	2011
Population	9,520	7,500	10,608	8,783	8,065	7,531	7,175	6,514
Sources: Census 2001, Census 2011, „pop-stat.mashke.org“,

=== Vital statistics ===
	Population	Live births	Deaths	Natural growth	Birth rate (‰)	Death rate (‰)	Natural growth rate (‰)
2000	9,208						
2001	8,524						
2002	8,337						
2003	8,221						
2004	8,127						
2005	8,065						
2006	7,775						
2007	7,531						
2008	7,319						
2009	7,175						
2010	7,066						
2011	6,440						
2012	6,285						
2013	6,126						
2014	5,977						
2015	6,050						
2016	5,845						
2017	5,804						
2018	5,596						

=== Religion ===
According to the latest Bulgarian census of 2011, the religious composition, among those who answered the optional question on religious identification, was the following:

Religious composition of Dimovo Municipality
Orthodox Christianity	91.1%
Catholicism	0.3%
Protestantism	0.2%
Islam	0.0%
No religion	5.4%
Prefer not to answer, others and indefinable	3.0%

An overwhelming majority of the population of Dimovo Municipality identify themselves as Christians. At the 2011 census, 91.1% of respondents identified as Orthodox Christians belonging to the Bulgarian Orthodox Church.

== See also ==
- Provinces of Bulgaria
- Municipalities of Bulgaria
- List of cities and towns in Bulgaria
