= Gara Oreshets =

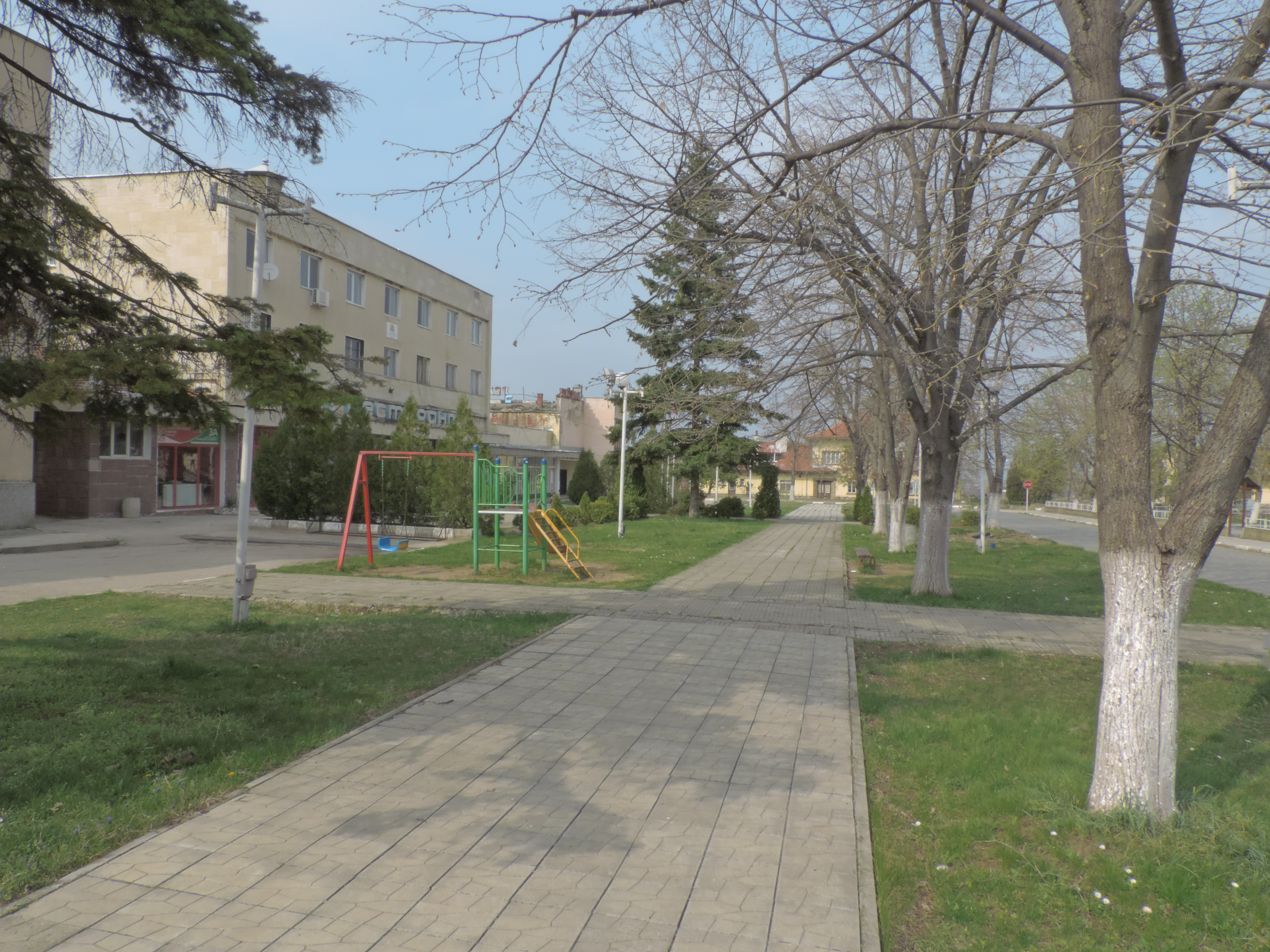

- Location of Gara Oreshets
- Coordinates: 43°39′25″N 22°44′20″E
- Country: Bulgaria
- Province: Vidin
- Municipality: Dimovo
- Elevation: 314 m (1,030 ft)

Population (2009)
  - Total: 819
- Time zone: UTC+2 (EET)
  - Summer (DST): UTC+3 (EEST)
- Postal Code: 3940
- Area code: 09322

Gara Oreshets (Bulgarian: Гара Орешец) is a village located in Dimovo Municipality, in the Vidin Province, of northwestern Bulgaria.
