= Archar (village) =

Village in Bulgaria

Archar Арчар
- Village
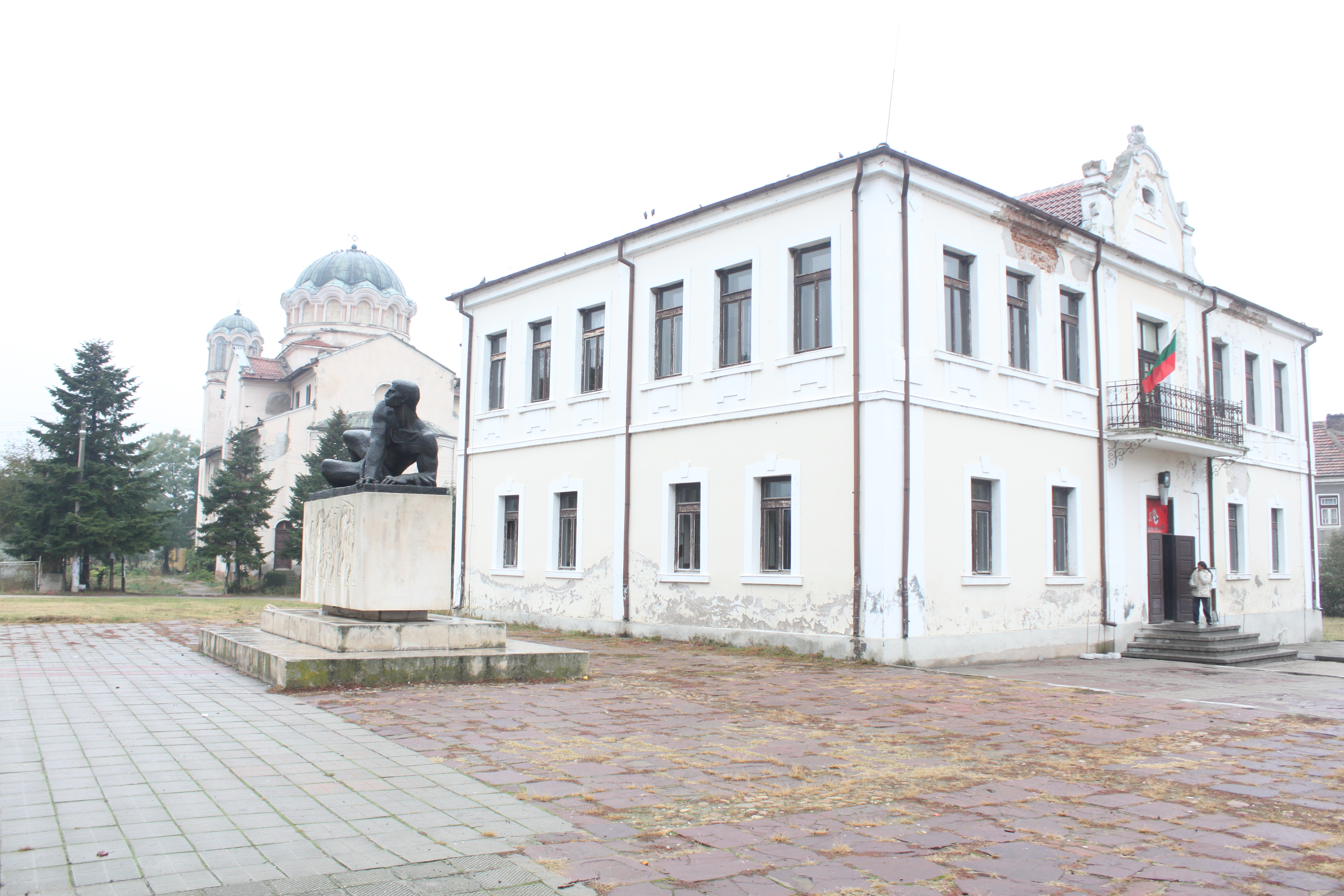

- Location of Archar, Bulgaria
- Coordinates: 43°48′39.34″N 22°55′7.91″E
- Country: Bulgaria
- Province: Vidin Province
- Municipality: Dimovo

Government
  - Mayor: Emil Georgiev
- Elevation: 444 m (1,457 ft)

Population (2022)
  - Total: 2,716
- Time zone: UTC+2 (EET)
  - Summer (DST): UTC+3 (EEST)
- Postal Code: 3770
- Area codes: 09317 from Bulgaria, 003599317 from outside

Archar (Bulgarian: Арчар) is a village in Bulgaria, located on the Archar river in the Vidin Province. In Roman times the town of Ratiaria, from which the name derives, has been an important port on the Danube. The present day locality has been developing closer to the main road between Vidin and Lom. A fair is held in Archar on the first Saturday and Sunday of August.

== History ==
The village was established during the second century close to Ratiaria where a Roman military fort was located. During the reign of Aurelian Ratiaria become the provincial capital of Dacia . The fort was sacked by the Huns in 440 or 441 and the Avars took the fort in 586. In the Ottoman Empire the place was known as "Akchar" until the name was changed to Archar in the late 1930's. In 1883 a school was opened and in 1898 a neoclassical community center (chitalishte) was built. After the Balkan War began in 1912, 2 people from Akchar volunteered to fight in the war. A Labor Cooperative Agricultural Farm was established in 1945. The agricultural farm was one of the earliest in the Vidin province. From 1981 to 1991 archaeological excavations were carried out around the village by a team of Bulgarians and Italians, supervised by the Archaeological Institute and Museum at the Bulgarian Academy of Sciences and the Department of Ancient History at the University of Bologna. The excavation works were abandoned in the early 90's and the archeological site was systematically raided by treasure hunters and local people. During the 1990's the population declined by some 30% as paid work became hard to find in the whole Vidin province.

== Geography ==
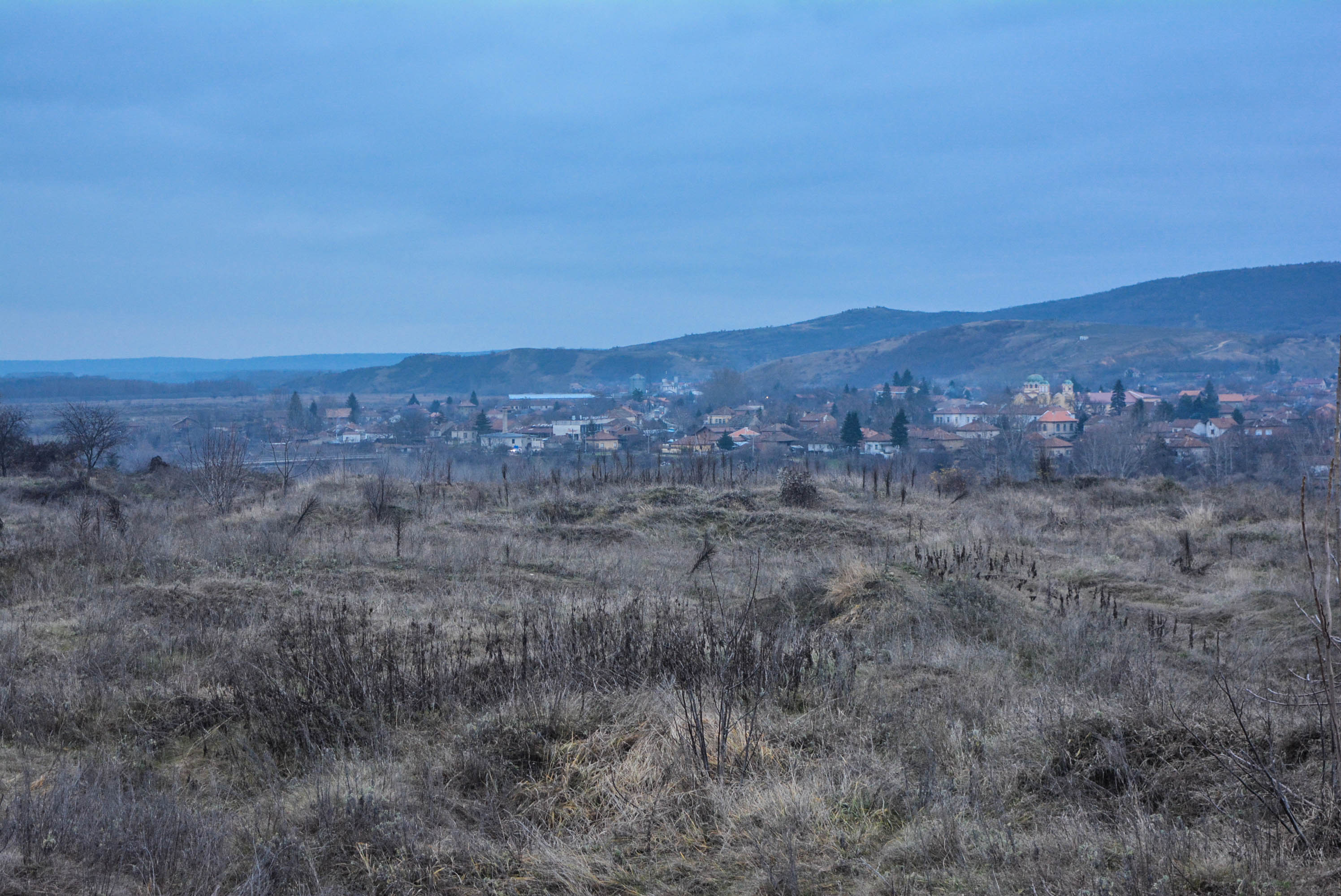
A view of Archar from the site of Ratiaria

The town is on the Vidin-Lom road in the Vidin province. It is located at the confluence of the Archar river. It is known among the locals as the Archaritsa river. The Barzartsi river also passes through the town. Archar is located 28 km from Vidin. Archar has four neighborhoods. Bulgarian, Turkish, Gypsy and Koritarska neighborhoods.

=== Demographics ===
According to the census of Bulgaria:

1934	1946	1956	1965	1975	1985	1992	2001	2011	2022
4,028	4,139	3,990	3,577	3,352	3,051	3,009	2,624	2,370	2,275

Populations by age group:

0–4	5 – 9	10–14	15 – 19	20–24	25 – 29	30–34	35 – 39	40–44	45 – 49	50–54	55 – 59	60–64	65 – 69	70–74	75 – 79	80–84	85+
171	167	117	155	177	128	142	131	159	134	136	140	166	140	106	95	69	37

== Culture ==
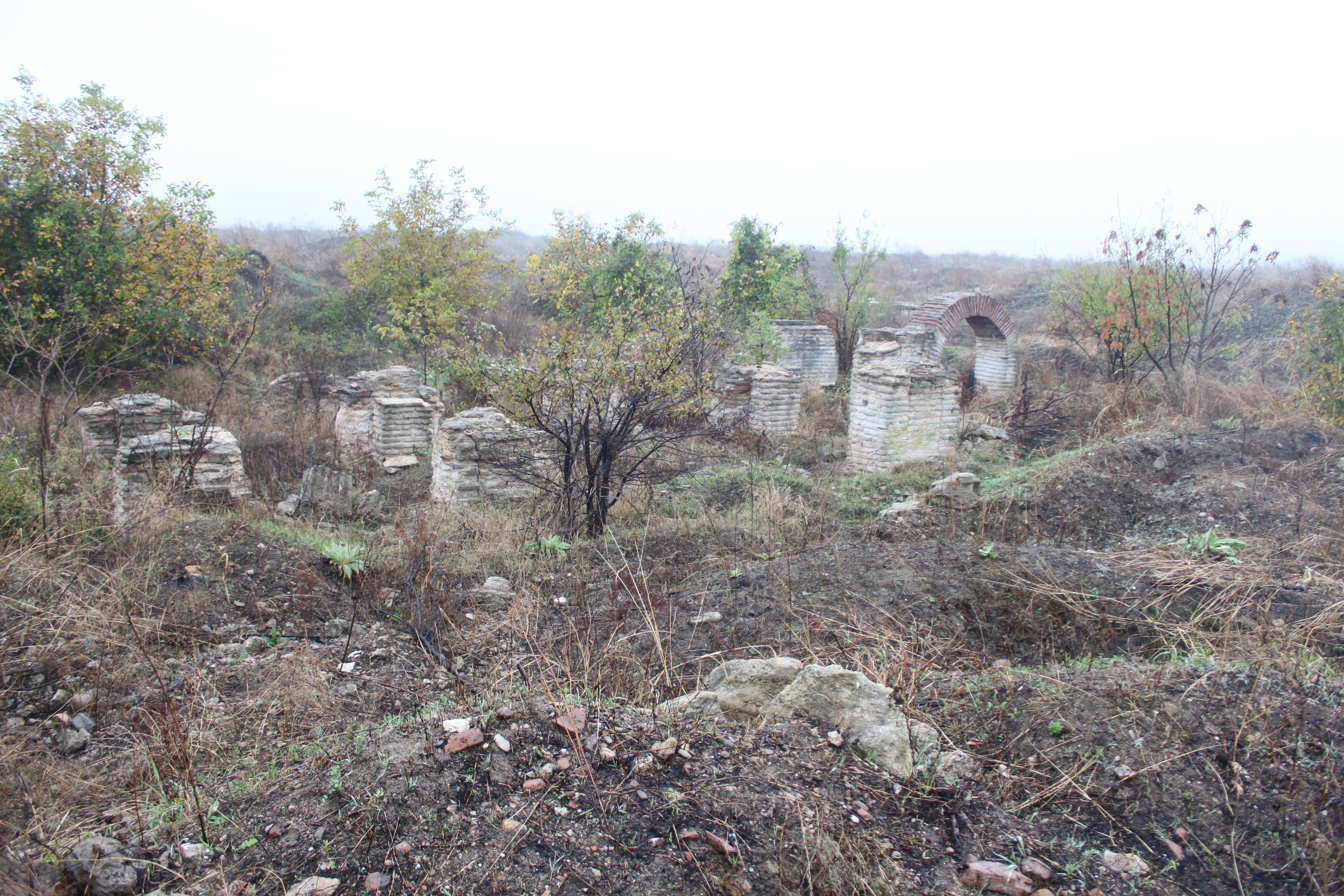
Archaeological site of Ratiaria

On the first Saturday and Sunday of August a fair is held. People come from the neighboring towns, which revives the trade of the town for 2–3 days. The town has a Soccer club that was once called Leviski. Its current name is Ratiaria.

== Archaeology ==
Gold artifacts and Roman coins have been found in the town. Most of the coins are of insignificant value. Fully preserved walls, remains of buildings, pottery, bowls, and pipes have also been found. The town is often the site of raids by treasure hunters.

== Notable people ==
- Alexander Apostolov (b. 1936), sculptor;
- Peter Avramov – born on November 20, 1954, in Archar. He graduated from the University of Economics in Varna (then VINS "Dimitar Blagoev"), has a master's degree in economics and 5 postgraduate qualifications in the field of management and insurance. In 1981 he was elected Deputy chairman of the Narcoop Committee, Vidin. In 1986 he was elected chairman of the board and Executive director of the newly formed cooperative enterprise.
