= Archar Peninsula =

Peninsula in the North-Western extremity of Greenwich Island, Antarctica

Coordinates: 62°27′30″S 60°00′00″W

Location of Greenwich Island in the South Shetland Islands

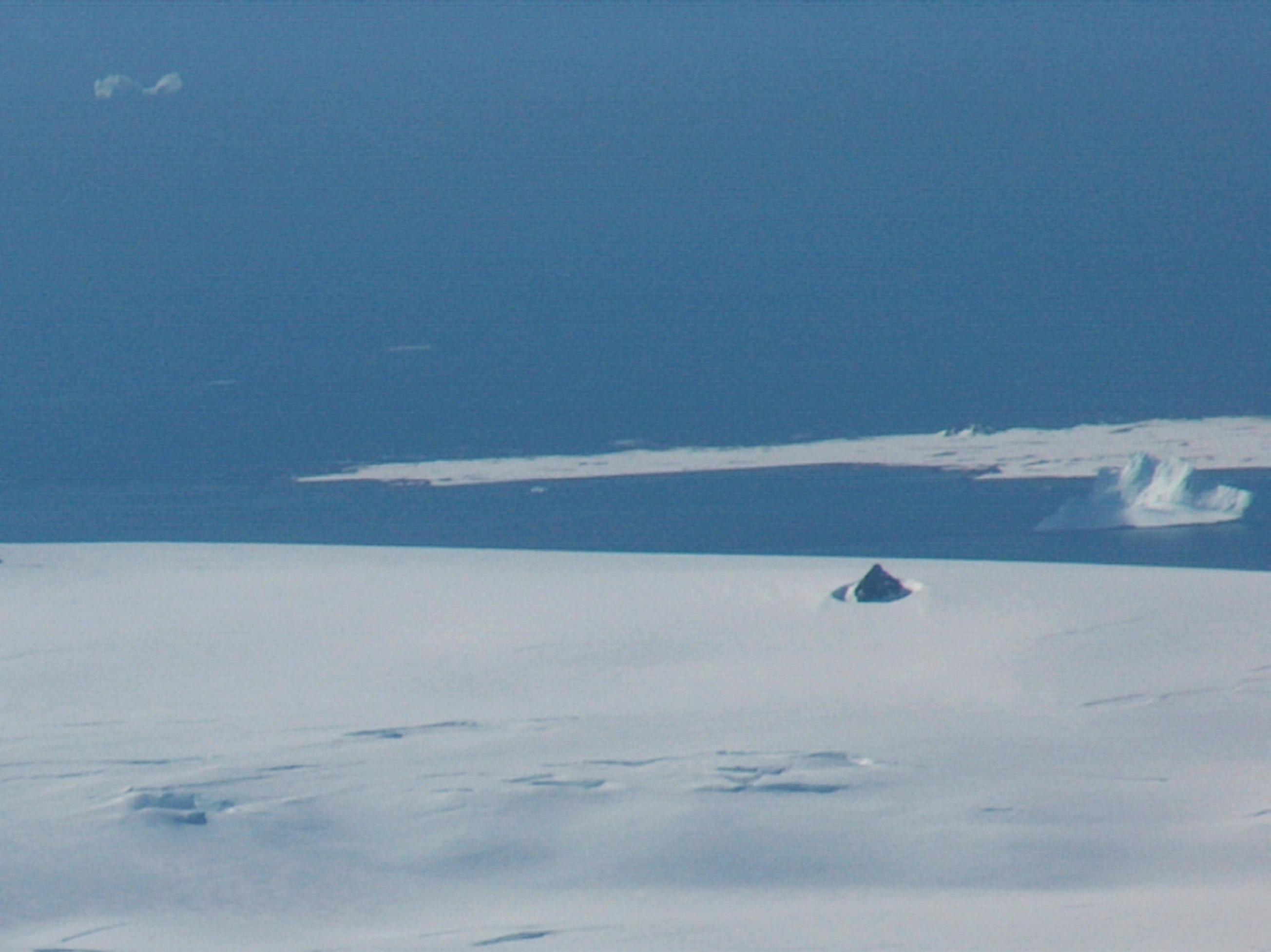
Archar Peninsula

Topographic map of Livingston Island, Greenwich, Robert, Snow and Smith Islands

Archar Peninsula (Bulgarian: полуостров Арчар, romanized: poluostrov Archar, IPA: [poɫuˈɔstrof ɐrˈt͡ʃar]) located in the North-Western extremity of Greenwich Island, Antarctica. The three km long peninsula is bounded by Razlog Cove to the North and McFarlane Strait to the South. Its western half is snow-free in summer. The peninsula is named after the settlement of Archar in Northwestern Bulgaria, successor of the ancient town of Ratiaria.

== See also ==
- Tangra 2004/05
- List of Bulgarian toponyms in Antarctica
- Antarctic Place-names Commission

== Maps ==
- South Shetland Islands. Scale 1:200000 topographic map. DOS 610 Sheet W 62 58. Tolworth, UK, 1968.
- South Shetland Islands. Scale 1:200000 topographic map. DOS 610 Sheet W 62 60. Tolworth, UK, 1968.
- L.L. Ivanov et al. Antarctica: Livingston Island and Greenwich Island, South Shetland Islands. Scale 1:100000 topographic map. Sofia: Antarctic Place-names Commission of Bulgaria, 2005.
- L.L. Ivanov. Antarctica: Livingston Island and Greenwich, Robert, Snow and Smith Islands. Scale 1:120000 topographic map. Troyan: Manfred Wörner Foundation, 2009. ISBN 978-954-92032-6-4
- Antarctic Digital Database (ADD). Scale 1:250000 topographic map of Antarctica. Scientific Committee on Antarctic Research (SCAR). Since 1993, regularly updated.
- L.L. Ivanov. Antarctica: Livingston Island and Smith Island. Scale 1:100000 topographic map. Manfred Wörner Foundation, 2017. ISBN 978-619-90008-3-0
