= Duff Point =

Point on Archar Peninsula in the South Shetland Islands, Antarctica

Location of Greenwich Island in the South Shetland Islands.

Topographic map of Livingston Island, Greenwich, Robert, Snow and Smith Islands.

Duff Point is a point on Archar Peninsula forming the western extremity of Greenwich Island, in the South Shetland Islands, Antarctica. The name Duffs Straits was applied to McFarlane Strait by James Weddell in 1820–23, after Captain Norwich Duff under whom Weddell served in HMS Espoir in 1814. The name Duff Point was given by the UK Antarctic Place-Names Committee in 1961 in order to preserve Weddell's name in the area; this point forms the northeast entrance to McFarlane Strait.

== Location ==
The point is located at 62°26′57.9″S 60°01′44.8″W which is 5.54 km east of Williams Point, Livingston Island, 15.63 km west of Spark Point and 8.54 km north of Inott Point (British mapping in 1821 and 1968, Bulgarian in 2005 and 2009).

== Maps ==
- L.L. Ivanov et al. Antarctica: Livingston Island and Greenwich Island, South Shetland Islands (from English Strait to Morton Strait, with illustrations and ice-cover distribution). Scale 1:100000 topographic map. Sofia: Antarctic Place-names Commission of Bulgaria, 2005.
- L.L. Ivanov. Antarctica: Livingston Island and Greenwich, Robert, Snow and Smith Islands. Scale 1:120000 topographic map. Troyan: Manfred Wörner Foundation, 2009. ISBN 978-954-92032-6-4 (Updated second edition 2010. ISBN 978-954-92032-9-5)
