= Konaka =

Konaka (written: 小中) is a Japanese surname. Notable people with the surname include:

- Chiaki J. Konaka (小中 千昭, born 1961), Japanese writer
- Ken Konaka (小中 健), Japanese table tennis player

== See also ==
- Konaka Station, a railway station in Midori, Gunma Prefecture, Japan
- Konaka Museum, a museum in Vidin, Bulgaria
