= Krastata Kazarma =

Former Ottoman military facility in Bulgaria

Coordinates: 43°59′25″N 22°52′54″E

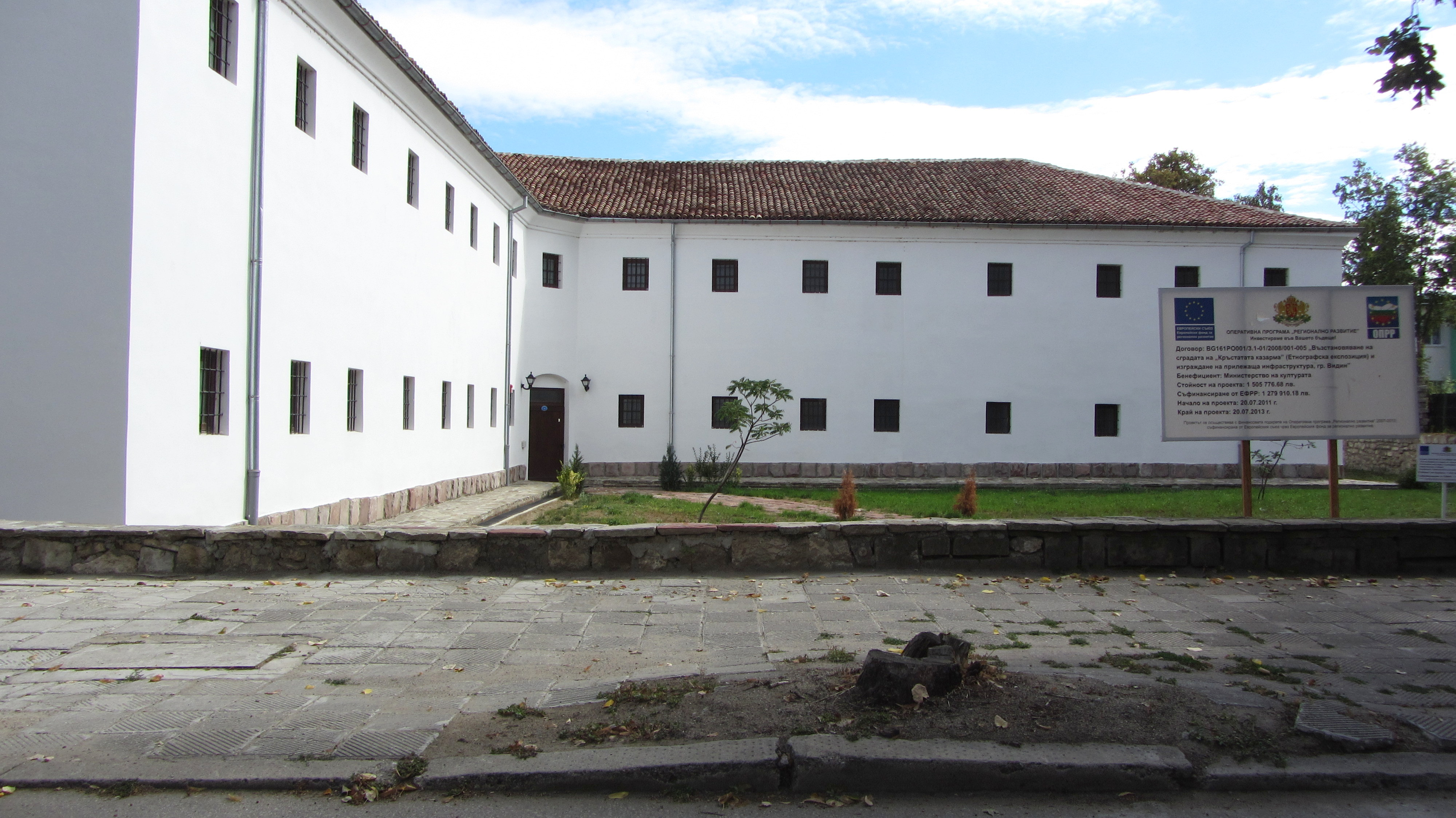
Krastata Kazarma

The Krastata Kazarma (Bulgarian: Кръстата казарма, cross-shaped barracks) is a former military facility of the Ottoman Empire. The barracks got its name due to its cross-shaped architecture. It is one of the cultural memorials of the region of Vidin, Bulgaria, today.

The building, constructed by Polish architects, was finished in 1801. It was used by four separate units, also by a unit of the Janissaries.

After liberation the building was used as court of law and as an accommodation building by the Bulgarian army. Today it houses the ethnographical section of the "Konaka" Museum.
