= Konaka Museum =

Museum in Bulgaria

Coordinates: 43°59′20″N 22°52′30″E

The Historical Museum Vidin, sometimes shortened to Konaka museum (Bulgarian: Музей "Конака"), is located in Vidin, Bulgaria. The museum, founded in 1956, is situated in a former Ottoman konak. The nice building is among the cultural memorials of the region.

Originally the 18th-century building was used as the Home by Osman Pazvantoğlu and later as police office, and the central tower was a lighthouse. After liberation the building was reconstructed and enriched with elements from Bulgarian Renaissance architecture. In 1956, the building was used for a historical weapon show.

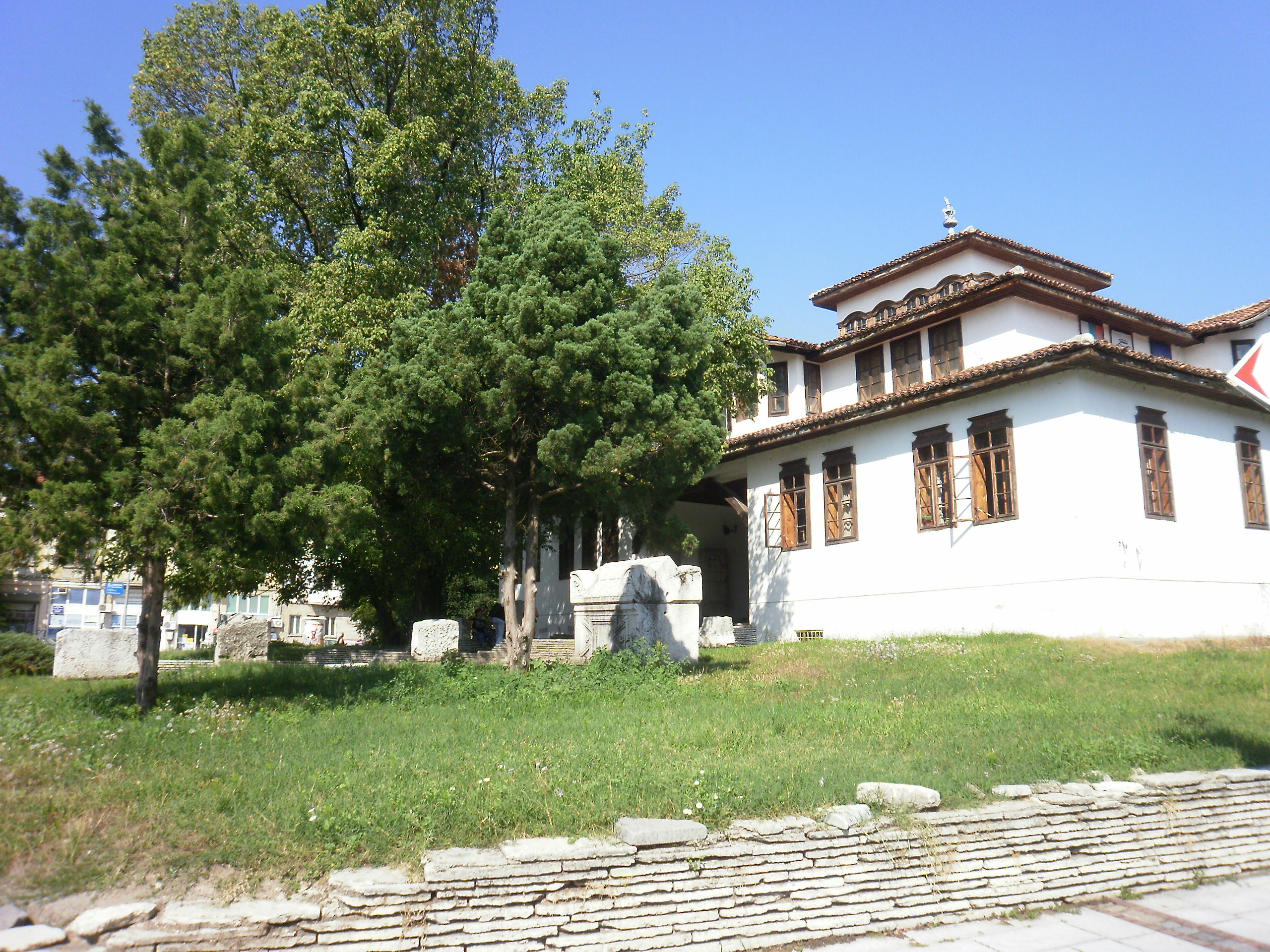

== Sections ==
- Archaeology (departments Prehistory, Classical Antiquity and Middle Ages) - located in Konaka
- Ethnography - located in the Krastata Kazarma (i.e. Cross barracks)
- Bulgarian lands in 15th-19th centuries - located in Konaka
- Numismatics
- Modern history
- Recent history
